= Opel =

German automotive brand

Opel Automobile GmbH
- Type: Subsidiary
- Industry: Automotive
- Founded: 21 January 1862; 164 years ago
- Founder: Adam Opel
- Headquarters: Rüsselsheim am Main, Hesse, Germany
- Number of locations: 10 manufacturing facilities
- Area served: Europe (as Vauxhall in the UK), Middle East and Asia-Pacific
- Key people: Florian Huettl (CEO)
- Products: Automobiles; Electric vehicles Commercial vehicles
- Production output: ▲1.2 million vehicles (2016)
- Revenue: ▲$18.7 billion (2016)
- Number of employees: 37,000 (2017)
- Parent: General Motors (1929–2017); PSA Group (2017–2021); Stellantis (2021–present)
- Divisions: Opel Performance Center
- Subsidiaries: Opel Eisenach; Opel Special Vehicles; Vauxhall Motors
- Website: opel.com

Opel Automobile GmbH (German pronunciation: [ˈoːpl̩]), usually shortened to Opel, is a German automobile manufacturer which has been a subsidiary of Stellantis since 16 January 2021. It was owned by the American automaker General Motors from 1929 until 2017 and the PSA Group prior to its merger with Fiat Chrysler Automobiles to form Stellantis in 2021. Most of the Opel lineup has been marketed under the Vauxhall brand in the United Kingdom since the 1980s. Some Opel vehicles were badge-engineered in Australia under the Holden brand until 2020, in North America and China under the Buick, Saturn (until 2010), and Cadillac brands, and in South America under the Chevrolet brand.

Opel traces its roots to a sewing machine manufacturer founded by Adam Opel in 1862 in Rüsselsheim am Main, Germany. The company began manufacturing bicycles in 1886 and produced its first automobile in 1899. With the Opel RAK program, the world's first rocket program, under the leadership of Fritz von Opel, the company played an important role in the history of aviation and spaceflight: Various land speed records were achieved, and the world's first rocket-powered flights were performed in 1928 and 1929. After listing on the stock market in 1929, General Motors took a majority stake in Opel and then full control in 1931, making the automaker a wholly owned subsidiary, establishing an American ownership of the German automaker for nearly 90 years. Together with British manufacturer Vauxhall Motors, which GM had acquired in 1925, the two companies formed the backbone of GM's European operations – later merged formally in the 1980s as General Motors Europe.

In March 2017, PSA Peugeot Citroën agreed to acquire Opel, the British twin sister brand Vauxhall and the European auto lending business from General Motors for €2 billion ($2.3 billion), making the French automaker the second biggest in Europe, after Volkswagen.

Opel is still headquartered in Rüsselsheim am Main. The company designs, engineers, manufactures, and distributes Opel-branded passenger vehicles, light commercial vehicles, and vehicle parts; together with its British sister marque Vauxhall, they are present in over 60 countries around the world.

== History ==
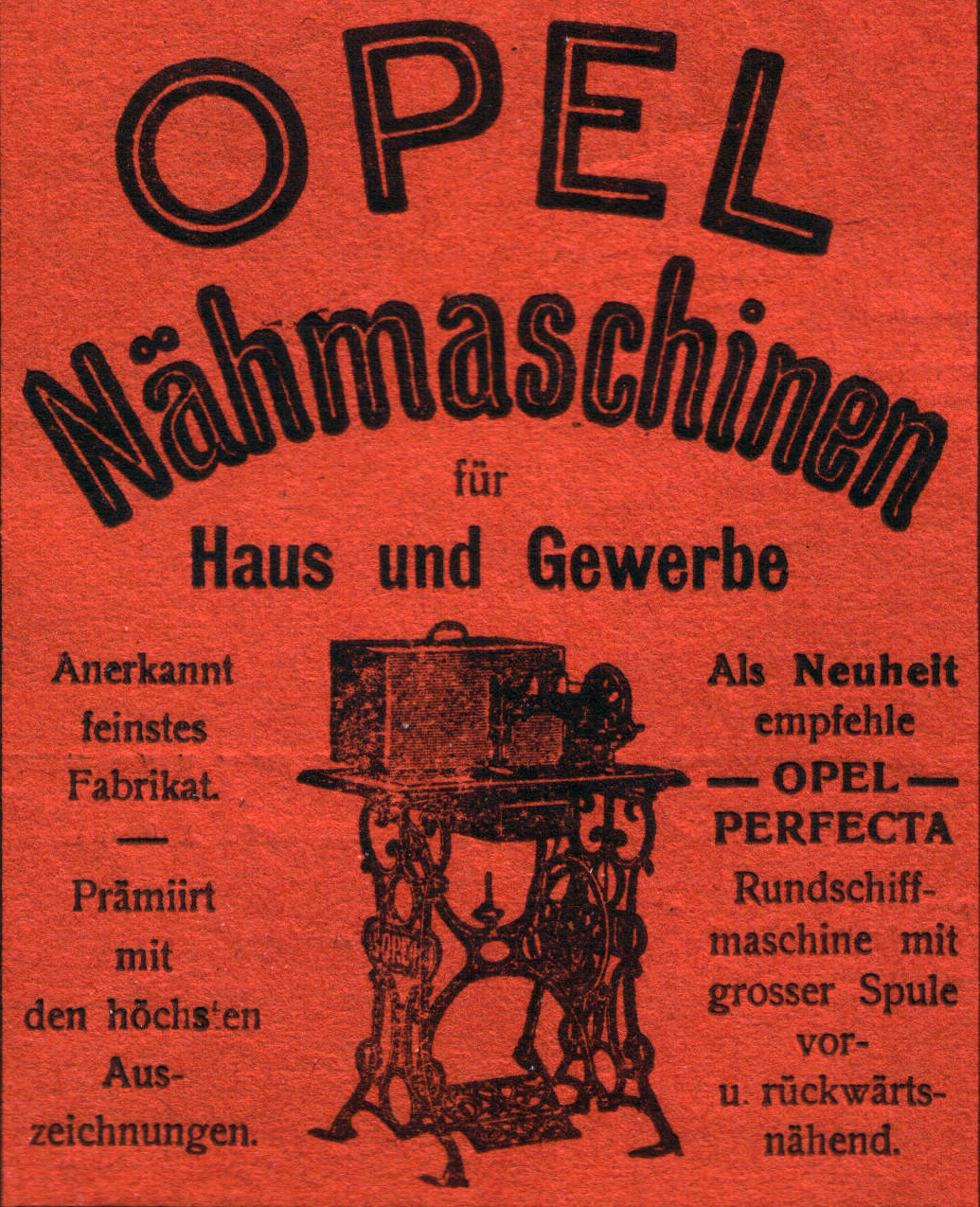
Advertisement for the Opel Perfecta sewing machines (1901)

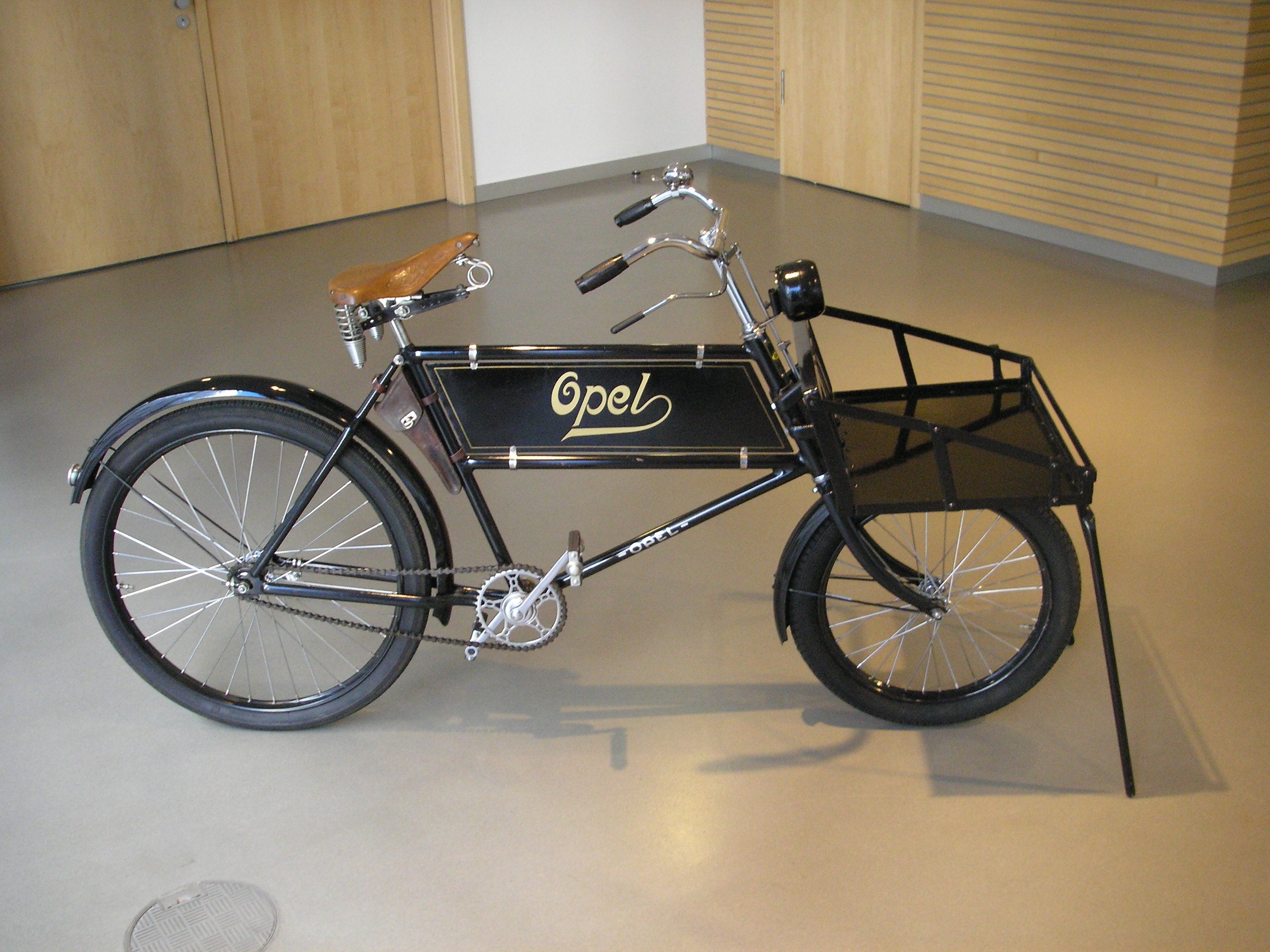
Opel safety bicycle

=== 1862–1898 ===
The company was founded in Rüsselsheim, Hesse, Germany, on 21 January 1862, by Adam Opel. In the beginning, Opel produced sewing machines. Opel launched a new product in 1886: he began to sell high-wheel bicycles, also known as penny-farthings. Opel's two sons participated in high-wheel bicycle races, thus promoting this means of transportation. In 1888, production was relocated from a cowshed to a more spacious building in Rüsselsheim. The production of high-wheel bicycles soon exceeded the production of sewing machines. At the time of Opel's death in 1895, he was the leader in both markets.

=== 1898–1920 ===
The first cars were designed in 1898 after Opel's widow Sophie and their two eldest sons entered into a partnership with Friedrich Lutzmann, a locksmith at the court in Dessau in Saxony-Anhalt, who had been working on automobile designs for some time. The first Opel production Patent Motor Car was built in Rüsselsheim early 1899, although these cars were not very successful (A total of 65 motor cars were delivered: eleven in 1899, twenty-four in 1900 and thirty in 1901) and the partnership was dissolved after two years, following which Opel signed a licensing agreement in 1901 with the French Automobiles Darracq France to manufacture vehicles under the brand name Opel Darracq. These cars consisted of Opel bodies mounted on Darracq chassis, powered by two-cylinder engines.

The company first showed cars of its design at the 1902 Hamburg Motor Show. Production began in 1906, with the licensed Opel Darracq version discontinued in 1907.

In 1909, the Opel 4/8 PS model, known as the Doktorwagen (lit. 'Doctor's Car') was produced. Its reliability and robustness were appreciated by physicians, who drove long distances to see their patients back when hard-surfaced roads were still rare. The Doktorwagen sold for only 3,950 marks, about half as much as the luxury models of its day.

The company's factory was destroyed by fire in 1911, and a new facility was built with more up-to-date machinery.

Opel's cars were initially tested on public roads, leading to complaints about noise and road damage. Under public pressure, Opel began construction of a test oval in 1917. The track was completed in 1919, but not open to the public until 24 October 1920 under the official name of Opel-Rennbahn (Opel Race Track).

=== 1920–1939 ===
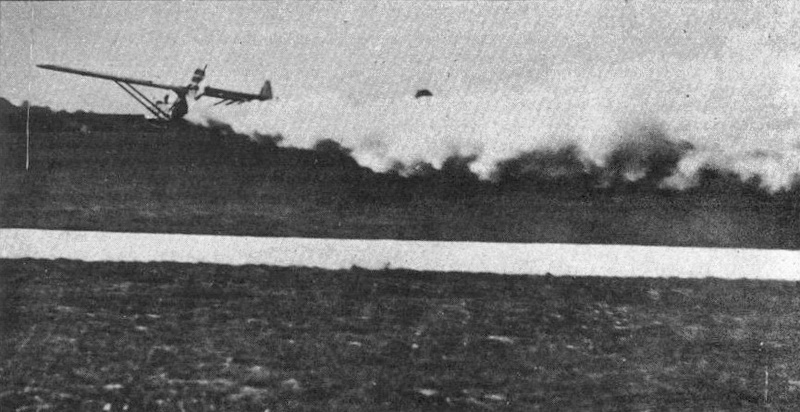
Opel RAK.1 – world's first public flight of a manned rocket-powered plane on 30 September 1929

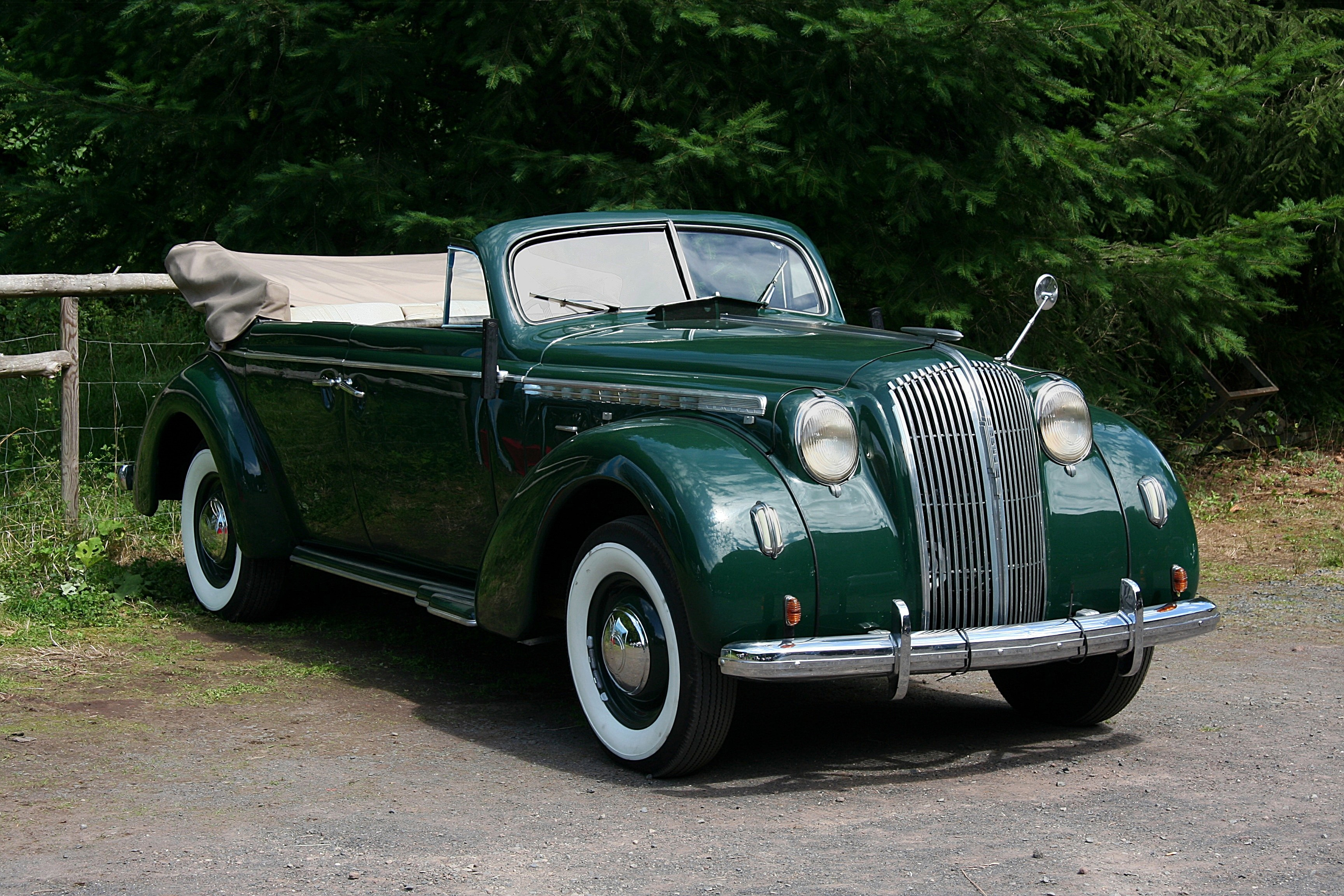
Opel Admiral convertible (1937–1939)

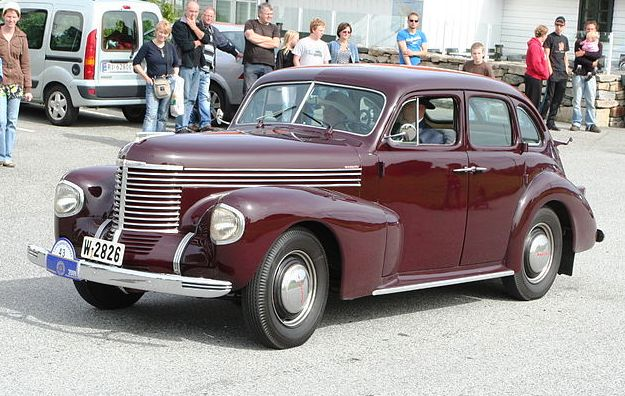
Opel Kapitän (1938–1940)

In the early 1920s, Opel became the first German car manufacturer to build automobiles with a mass-production assembly line. In 1924, they used their assembly line to produce a new open two-seater called the Laubfrosch (Tree frog). The Laubfrosch was finished exclusively in green lacquer. The car sold for an expensive 3,900 marks (expensive considering the less expensive manufacturing process), but by the 1930s, this type of vehicle would cost a mere 1,930 marks – due in part to the assembly line, but also due to the skyrocketing demand for cars. Adam Opel led the way for motorised transportation to become not just a means for the rich, but also a reliable way for people of all classes to travel.

Opel had a 37.5% market share in Germany and was the country's largest automobile exporter in 1928. The "Regent" – Opel's first eight-cylinder car – was offered. The RAK 1 and RAK 2 rocket-propelled cars made sensational record-breaking runs.

Opel as a company and its co-owner Fritz von Opel, grandson of Adam Opel, were instrumental in popularizing rocket propulsion for vehicles and have an important place in the history of spaceflight and rocket technology. In the 1920s, Fritz von Opel initiated together with Max Valier, co-founder of the "Verein für Raumschiffahrt", the world's first rocket program, Opel-RAK, leading to speed records for automobiles, rail vehicles and the first manned rocket-powered flight in September 1929. Months earlier in 1928, one of his rocket-powered prototypes, the Opel RAK2, piloted by von Opel himself at the AVUS speedway in Berlin, reached a record speed of 238 km/h (148 mph) in front of 3,000 spectators and world media representatives, including Fritz Lang, director of Metropolis and Woman in the Moon, world boxing champion Max Schmeling, and many other sports and show business celebrities. A world speed record for rail vehicles was reached with RAK3 at a top speed of 256 km/h (159 mph). After these successes, von Opel piloted the world's first public rocket-powered flight using Opel RAK.1, a rocket plane designed by Julius Hatry. World media reported these events, including Universal Newsreel in the US, causing "Raketen-Rummel" or "Rocket Rumble" immense global public excitement, particularly in Germany, where, among others, Wernher von Braun was highly influenced.

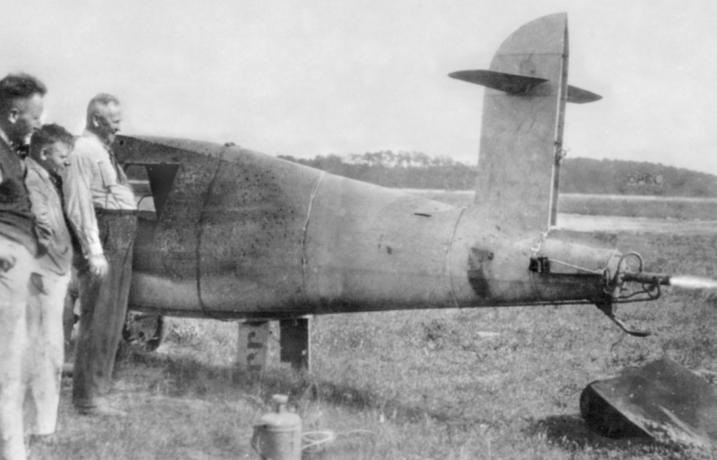
Friedrich Sander, Opel RAK technician August Becker and Opel employee Karl Treber (from right to left) in front of liquid-fuel rocket-plane prototype while test operation at Opel Rennbahn in Rüsselsheim

Opel RAK became enthralled with liquid propulsion, building and testing them in the late 1920s in Rüsselsheim. According to Max Valier's account, Opel RAK rocket designer, Friedrich Wilhelm Sander launched two liquid-fuel rockets at Opel Rennbahn in Rüsselsheim on 10 and 12 April 1929. These Opel RAK rockets were the first European, and after Goddard, the world's second, liquid-fuel rockets in history. In his book Raketenfahrt Valier describes the size of the rockets as of 21 cm (8.3 in) in diameter and with a length of 74 cm (29 in), weighing 7 kg (15 lb) empty and 16 kg (35 lb) with fuel. The maximum thrust was 45 to 50 kp, with a total burning time of 132 seconds. These properties indicate a gas pressure pumping. The first missile rose so quickly that Sander lost sight of it. Two days later, a second unit was ready to go, Sander tied a 4,000-meter (13,000 ft)-long rope to the rocket. After 2,000 m (6,600 ft) of rope had been unwound, the line broke, and this rocket also disappeared in the area, probably near the Opel proving ground and racetrack in Rüsselsheim, the "Rennbahn". Sander and Opel also worked on an innovative liquid-propellant rocket engine for an anticipated flight across the English Channel. By May 1929, the engine produced a thrust of 200 kg (440 lb.) "for longer than fifteen minutes, and in July 1929, the Opel RAK collaborators were able to attain powered phases of more than thirty minutes for thrusts of 300 kg (660-lb.) at Opel's works in Rüsselsheim," again according to Max Valier's account.

The Great Depression led to an end of the Opel-RAK program, but Max Valier continued the efforts. After switching from solid-fuel to liquid-fuel rockets, he died while testing and is considered the first fatality of the dawning space age. Sander's technology was confiscated by the German military in 1935. He was forced to sell his company and was imprisoned for treason. He died in 1938.

In March 1929, General Motors (GM), impressed by Opel's modern production facilities, bought 80% of the company. The Opel family gained $33.3 million from the transaction. Subsequently, during 1935, a second factory was built at Brandenburg for the production of "Blitz" light trucks. In 1929 Opel licensed the design of the radical Neander motorcycle and produced it as the Opel Motoclub in 1929 and 1930, using Küchen, J.A.P., and Motosacoche engines. Fritz von Opel attached solid-fuel rockets to his Motoclub in a publicity stunt, riding the rocket-boosted motorcycle at the Avus racetrack.

After acquiring the remaining shares in 1931, General Motors had full ownership of Adam Opel AG and organized it as a wholly owned subsidiary. In 1935, Opel became the first German car manufacturer to produce over 100,000 vehicles annually. This was because of the popularity of the Opel P4 model. The sales price was 1,650 marks and the car had a 23 PS (17 kW) 1.1 L four-cylinder engine achieving a top speed of 85 km/h (53 mph).

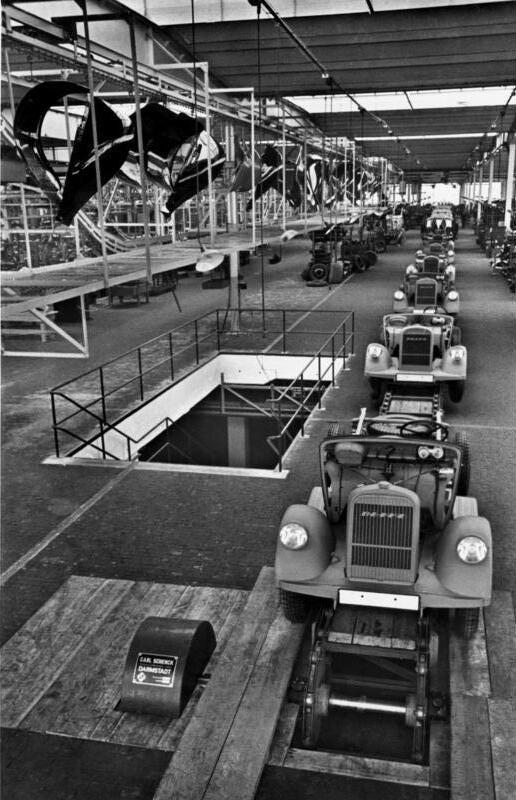
Opel Blitz assembly at the Brandenburg plant, 1936

Opel also produced the first mass-production vehicle in Germany with a self-supporting ("unibody") all-steel body, closely following the 1934 Citroën Traction Avant. This was one of the most important innovations in automotive history. Launched in 1935, the Olympia was light and its aerodynamics enhanced performance and fuel economy.

The 1930s was a decade of growth, and by 1937, with 130,267 cars produced. Opel's Rüsselsheim facility was Europe's top in terms of vehicle production, and ranking seventh worldwide.

During the rise of Nazism, Opel benefited from the efforts of the Nazi Party to endear itself to the German public by gaining tax-exempt status to produce inexpensive cars. Opel's share of the German car market expanded from 35 per cent in 1933 over 50 per cent in 1935.

1938 saw the presentation of the highly successful Kapitän. With a 2.5 L six-cylinder engine, all-steel body, front independent suspension, hydraulic shock absorbers, hot-water heating (with electric blower), and central speedometer. 25,374 Kapitäns were made before the intensification of World War II brought automotive manufacturing to a temporary stop in the autumn of 1940, by order of the government.

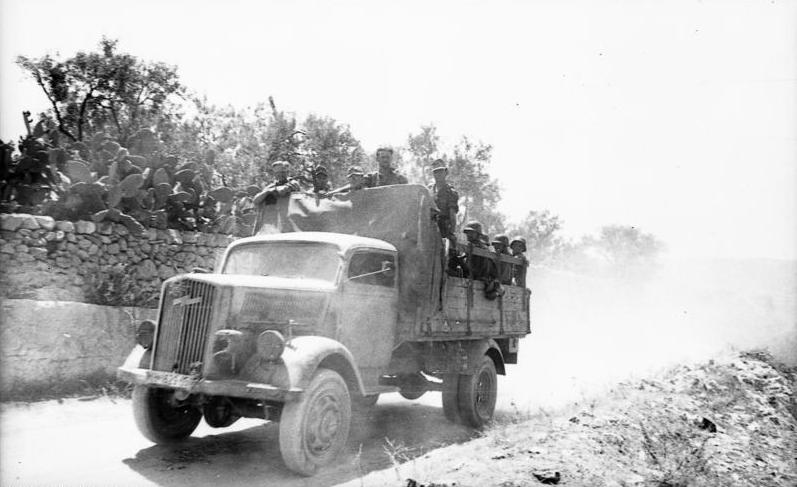
Military Opel Blitz in Italy (1944)

=== World War II ===
Immediately prior to World War II, the American leadership of General Motors was philosophically of the opinion that, as Alfred P. Sloan, Jr., chairman of the GM board wrote, an "international business operating throughout the world, should conduct its operations in strictly business terms, without regard to the political beliefs of its management, or the beliefs of the country in which it is operating." Thus, by 1939, along with Ford, Opel was Germany's largest tank producer.

While some sources indicate Opel automobile production ended in October 1940, after the company's American leadership rejected an "invitation" to switch to munitions manufacture a few months earlier, Opel continued to produce trucks throughout the war. The Opel Blitz was used in large numbers by the Wehrmacht on many fronts for various purposes, including servicing military transports.

Truck manufacture continued at the Brandenburg plant, where the 3.6-liter Opel Blitz truck had been built since 1938. These 3 short tons (2.7 t) trucks were also built under license by Daimler-Benz in Mannheim.

Both GM and Opel have admitted that Opel used forced labor during World War II. The degree of control that General Motors in the US had over Opel at the time is subject to debate, but by production numbers alone, it is evident that Opel was heavily involved in production of trucks and other equipment.

The Opel Blitz was one of the vehicles used by Germans in The Holocaust as a gas van to kill with carbon monoxide.

=== 1945–1970 ===
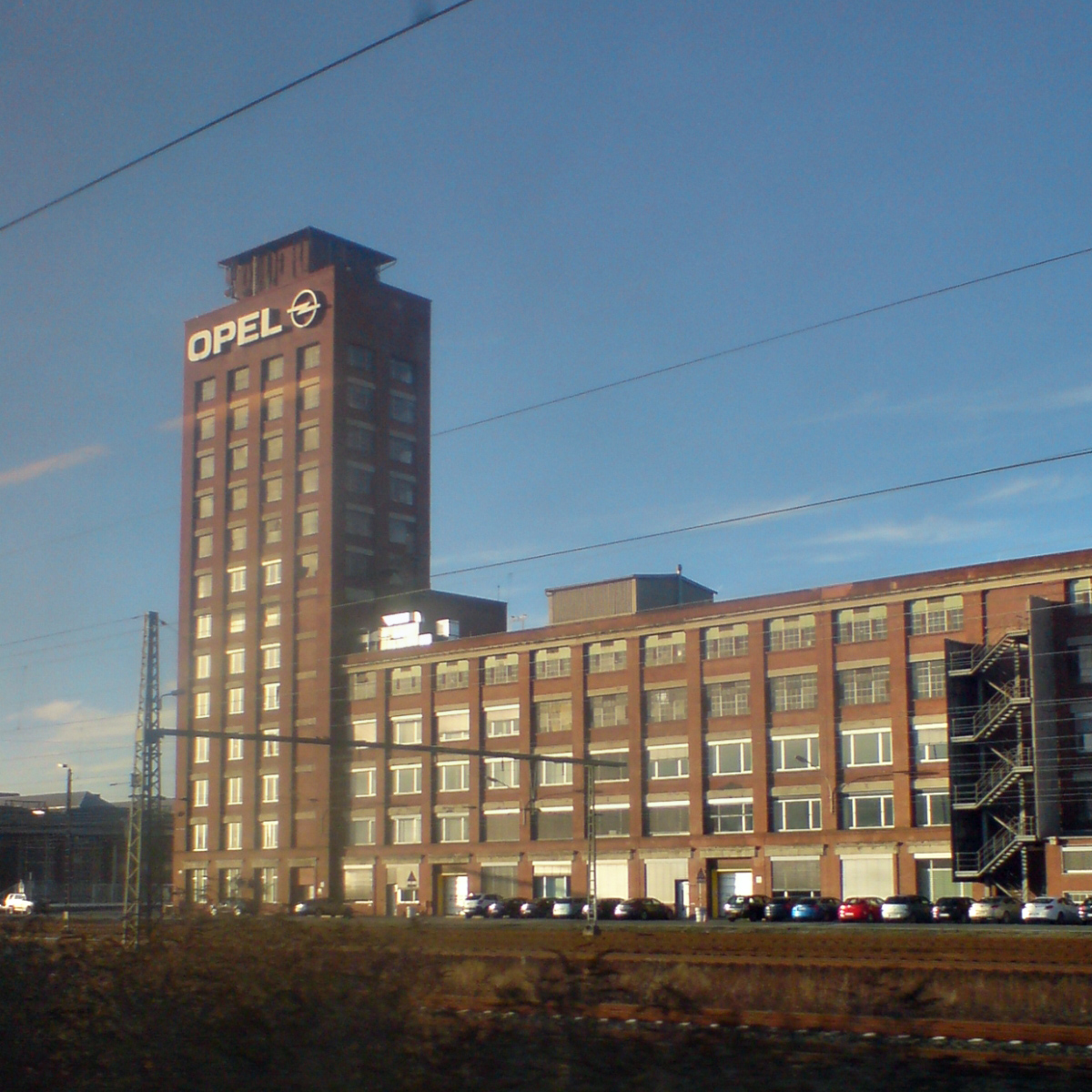
An administration building of Opel Rüsselsheim

After the end of the war, with the Brandenburg plant dismantled and transported to the Soviet Union to become the base of the Moskvitch 400, and 47% of the buildings in Rüsselsheim destroyed, former Opel employees began to rebuild the Rüsselsheim plant. The first postwar Opel Blitz truck was completed on 15 July 1946 in the presence of United States Army General Geoffrey Keyes and other local leaders and press reporters. Opel's Rüsselsheim plant also made Frigidaire refrigerators in the early post-war years.

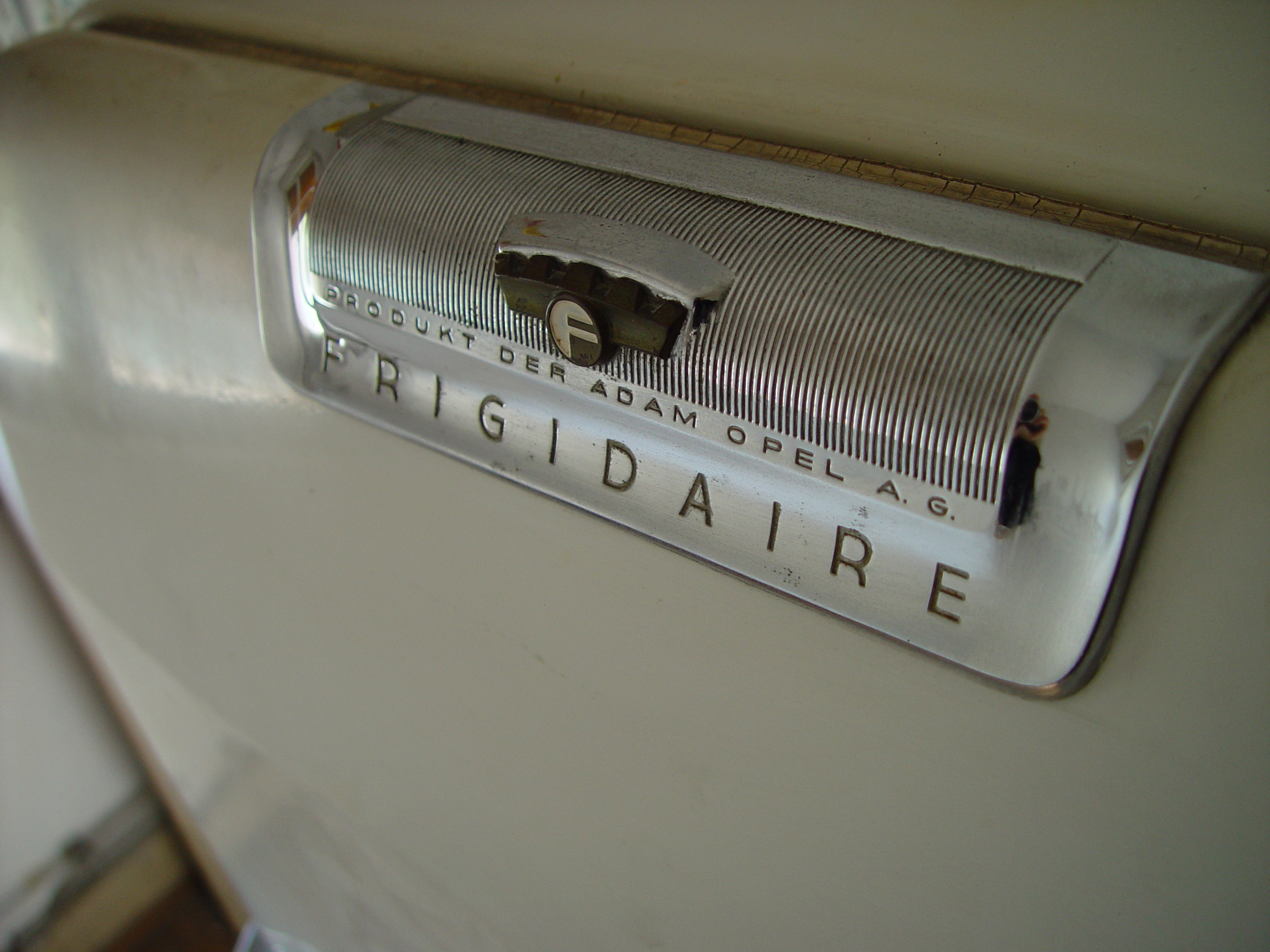
Opel product of the 1940s: Frigidaire refrigerator

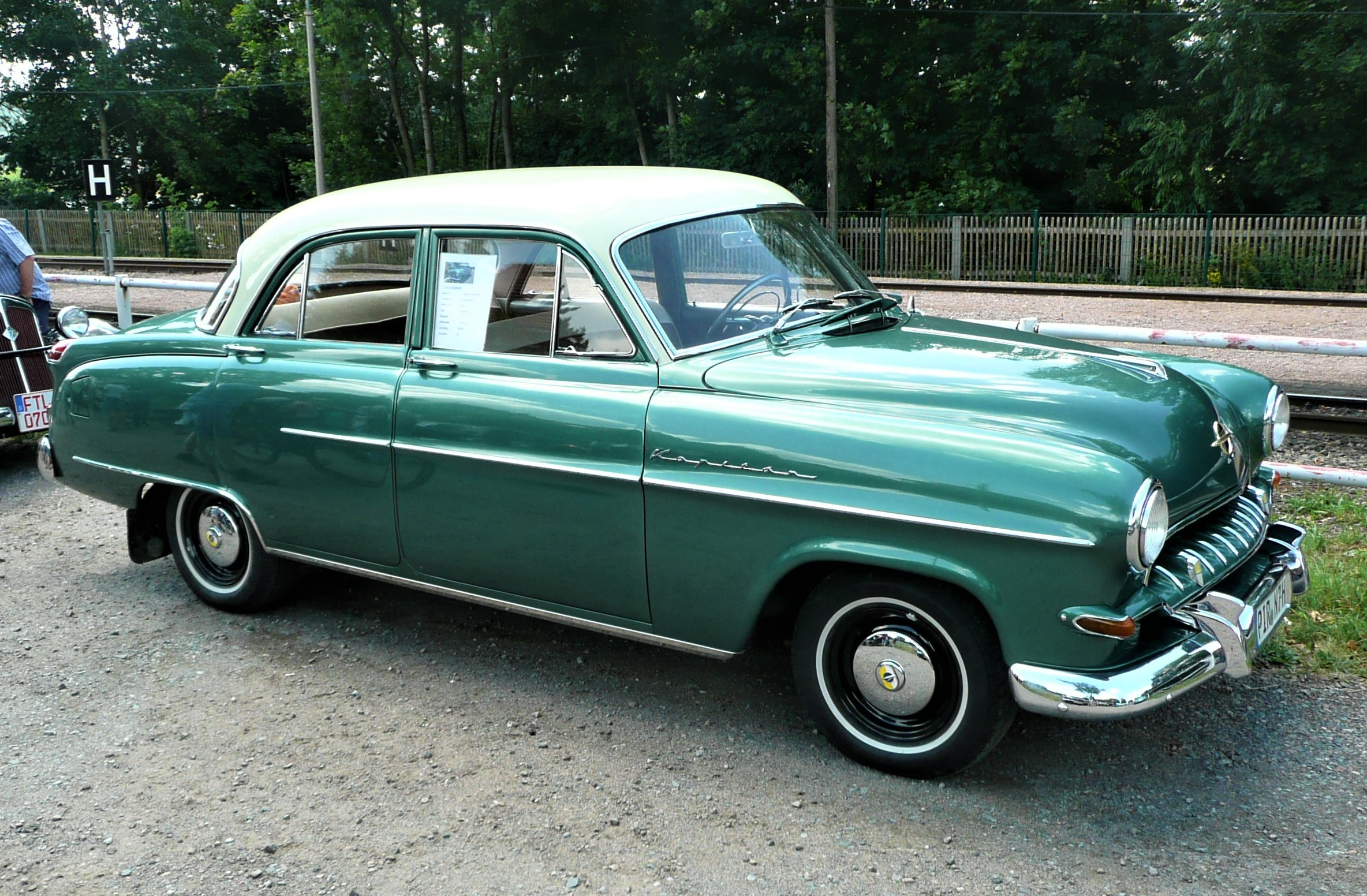
1952 Opel Kapitän

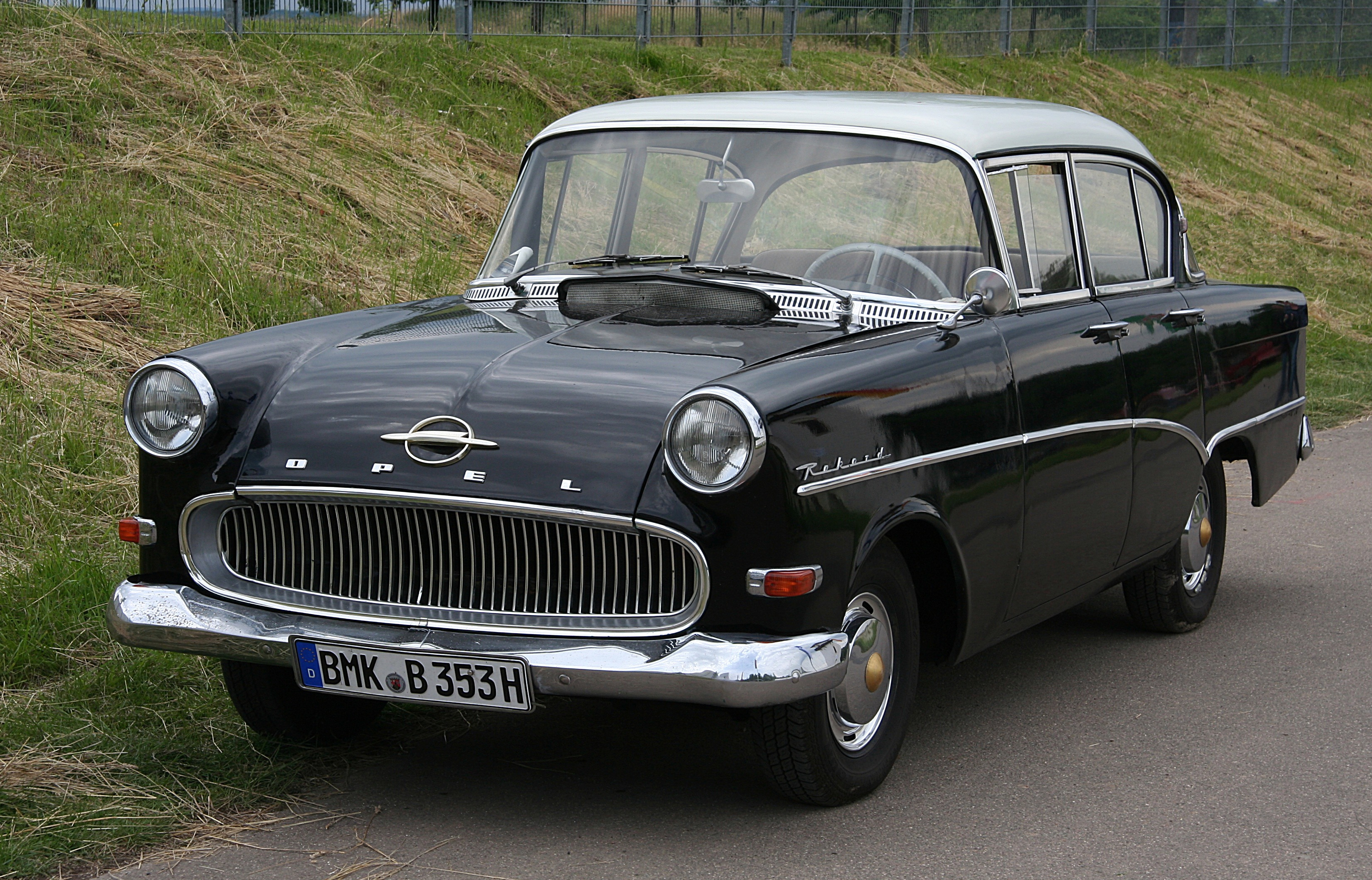
Opel Rekord P1 (1957–1960)

=== 1970–2017 ===
During the 1970s and 1980s, the Vauxhall and Opel ranges were rationalised into one consistent range across Europe.

The 1973 version of the Opel Kadett was later rebadged in hatchback, saloon, and estate form as the Vauxhall Chevette for the UK market, with German factories producing the Opel versions. The Opel Ascona of this era was sold on the UK market (and made in British and continental factories) as the Vauxhall Cavalier. Both of these cars had mild styling changes, as did the flagship Opel Rekord and Vauxhall Carlton saloon and estate ranges, which went on sale towards the end of the 1970s.

By the 1970s, Opel had emerged as the stronger of GM's two European brands; Vauxhall was the third-best-selling brand in Great Britain after the British Motor Corporation (later British Leyland) but made only a modest impact elsewhere. The two companies were direct competitors outside of each other's respective home markets. Still, mirroring US automaker Ford's decision to merge its British and German subsidiaries in the late 1960s, GM followed the same precedent. Opel and Vauxhall had loosely collaborated before, but serious efforts to merge the two companies' operations and product families into one did not start until the 1970s – which had Vauxhall's complete product line replaced by vehicles built on Opel-based platforms – the only exception to the rule being the Bedford CF panel van. This only solely Vauxhall design was marketed as an Opel on the continent. By the turn of the 1980s, the two brands were, in effect, the same.

Opel's first front-wheel drive car – the new version of the Kadett – entered production in 1979, initially built in Germany and Belgium. It was sold in the UK alongside the stronger-selling Vauxhall version – the Astra – which entered UK production in 1981.

During the 1970s, Opel expressed interest in building an additional production facility in Spain and eventually settled on a location near Zaragoza, intending to develop a new supermini for the 1980s there. The factory opened in 1982, and its first product was the Opel Corsa (imported to the UK as the Vauxhall Nova from 1983).

The Ascona switched to front-wheel drive for an all-new General Motors J-Car global model format in 1981, with the Cavalier nameplate continuing for the UK market. The Kadett was revamped again in 1984, and became the company's first winner of the European Car of the Year accolade. The Rekord's successor, the Opel Omega (still Vauxhall Carlton in the UK), achieved the same success two years later.

The long-running Ascona nameplate was discontinued in 1988, with its replacement being sold as the Vectra, although the UK market version was still sold as the Vauxhall Cavalier. The Opel Manta coupe was also discontinued in 1988, with its Vectra-based successor, the Calibra, being launched the following year. Soon afterward, Opel launched a high-performance version of the Omega – the Lotus Omega (Lotus Carlton in the UK) – which featured Lotus-tuned suspension and had a top speed of 175 mph.

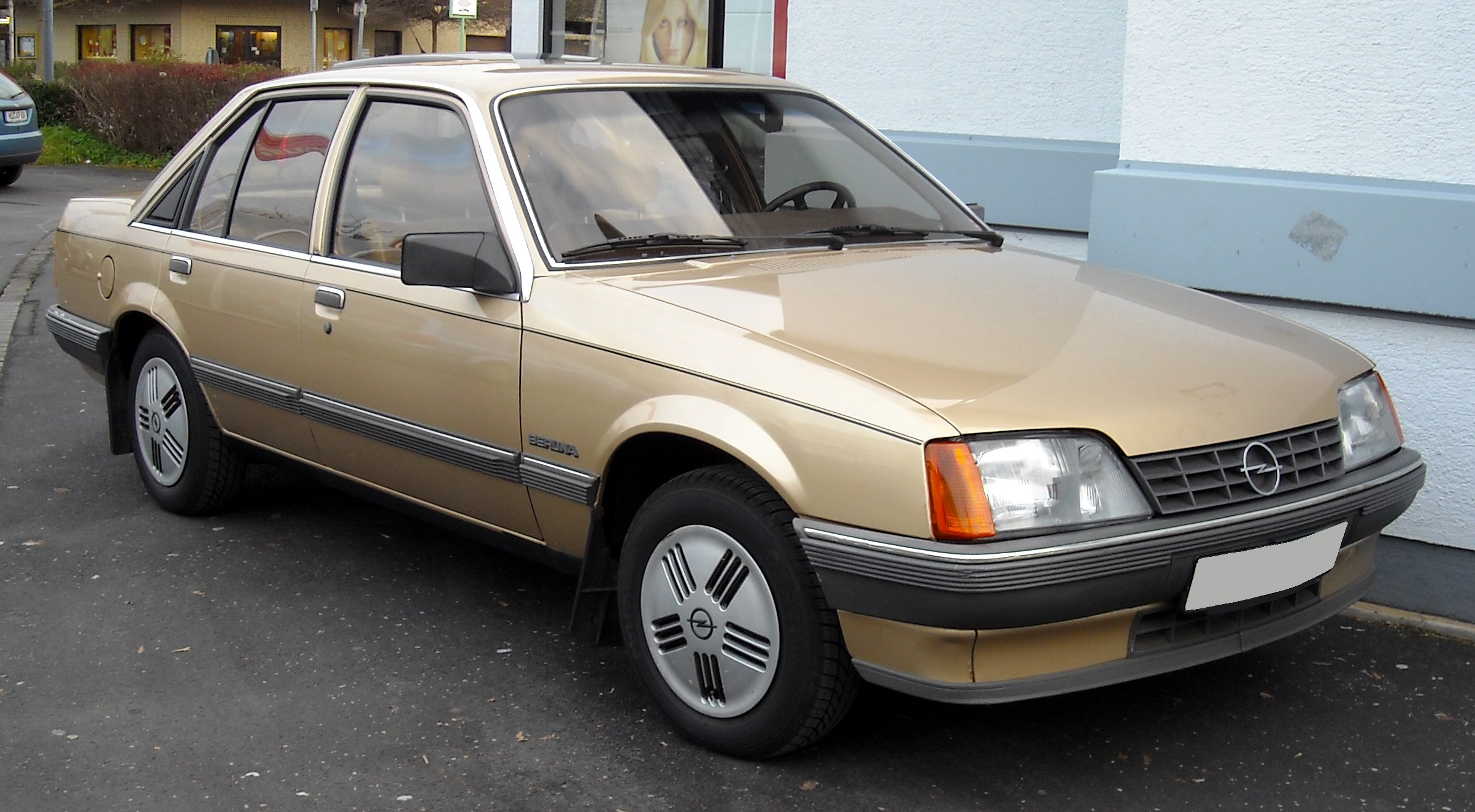
Opel Rekord E, mk.2 (1982–1986)

Opel's first turbocharged car was the Opel Rekord 2.3 TD, first shown at Geneva in March 1984.

In the 1990s, Opel was considered GM's cash cow, with profit margins similar to Toyota's. Opel's profit helped to offset GM's losses in North America and to fund GM's expansion into Asia. 1999 was the last time when Opel was profitable for an entire year after almost 20 years.

The first major Opel launch of the 1990s was the 1991 Astra, which spelled the end for the Kadett nameplate that had debuted more than 50 years earlier. The company also turned to Japanese Isuzu for its first SUV, the Frontera, which was also launched in 1991 but produced in Europe despite its Japanese origins. The larger Monterey joined the company's SUV line-up in 1994, but had been dropped from the UK and continental markets by 2000 due to disappointing sales.

At the end of 1992, the company unveiled a completely new Corsa, which, like the original model, was produced at the Zaragoza plant. This car carried the Corsa nameplate on the UK market as a Vauxhall.

A second generation Omega was launched in early 1994. It remained in production for a decade, but when production finished, there was no direct successor due to declining sales of executive saloon models from mainstream brands. A Corsa-based coupe, the Tigra, was also launched around this time and lasted in production for six years.

The second generation Opel Vectra was launched in 1995, with the Vectra nameplate now extending to the Vauxhall version in the UK.

The first Opel MPV, the Sintra, was launched in Europe in 1996, imported from the US where it was sold as a Pontiac, but discontinued after three years due to disappointing sales. The Vauxhall-badged UK market version was also slated in motoring surveys for its dismal build quality and reliability.

1997 saw the demise of the Calibra coupe after an eight-year production, with no immediate replacement.

The Opel Astra hatchbacks, saloons, and estate were wholly revamped for 1998 and, within two years, had also spawned coupe and cabriolet versions, as well as a compact MPV, the Zafira.

In 1999, Opel unveiled its first sports car, the Speedster (Vauxhall VX220 in the UK). However, it was not a success and was discontinued in 2005. The company moved into the city car market in early 2000 with the Agila launch.

The third generation Opel Corsa was launched in 2000, followed by a new version of the Vectra in 2002 and the Astra in 2004.

Three generations of Vectra gave way to the Insignia in 2008, with the new model becoming the company's first European Car of the Year award winner for 22 years.

After the 2008 financial crisis, and the General Motors Chapter 11 reorganization, on 10 September 2009, GM agreed to sell a 55% stake in Opel to a consortium including Magna group and Sberbank – with the approval of the German government. The deal was later called off.

With ongoing restructuring plans, Opel announced the closure of its Antwerp plant in Belgium by the end of 2010.

In 2010, Opel announced that it would invest around €11 billion in the next five years. €1 billion of that was designated solely for the development of innovative and fuel-saving engines and transmissions.

On 29 February 2012, Opel announced the creation of a major alliance with PSA Peugeot Citroen, resulting in GM taking a 7% share of PSA, becoming PSA's second-largest shareholder after the Peugeot family. The alliance was intended to enable $2 billion per year of cost savings through platform sharing, common purchasing, and other economies of scale. In December 2013, GM sold its 7% interest in PSA for £250 million, after plans of cost savings were not as successful. Opel was said to be among Europe's most aggressive discounters in the market. GM reported a 2016 loss of US$257 million from its European operations. It is reported that GM has lost about US$20 billion in Europe since 1999.

Opel's plant in Bochum closed in December 2014, after 52 years of activity, due to overcapacity.

Opel withdrew from China, where it had a network of 22 dealers, in early 2015 after General Motors decided to withdraw its Chevrolet brand from Europe starting in 2016.

=== 2017–present ===
In March 2017, the PSA Group agreed to buy Opel, its British sister brand Vauxhall and their European auto lending business from General Motors for US$2.2 billion. In return, General Motors will pay PSA US$3.2 billion for future European pension obligations and keep managing US$9.8 billion worth of plans for existing retirees. Furthermore, GM is responsible for paying about US$400 million annually for 15 years to fund the existing pension plans in Great Britain and Germany.

In June 2017, Michael Lohscheller, Opel's chief financial officer, replaced Karl-Thomas Neumann as CEO. The acquisition of Opel and Vauxhall was completed in August 2017.

In the 2018 financial year, Opel achieved an operating income of €859 million. It was the first positive income since 1999.

On 16 January 2021, Opel became part of Stellantis following the merger of its parent company PSA Group with the Italian-American group Fiat Chrysler Automobiles.

In July 2021, Opel announced that it would become a fully electric car company in their core Europe market by 2028. The announcement was made during Stellantis' EV Day 2021 strategy presentation and formed part of the company's broader electrification strategy.

In September 2021, Stellantis appointed Uwe Hochgeschurtz to Opel's management to replace Michael Lohscheller who left to Vinfast.

In May 2022, Stellantis announced that Florian Huettl would succeed Hochgeschurtz as CEO of Opel and Vauxhall, effective 1 June 2022, after Hochgeschurtz was appointed COO for Enlarged Europe at Stellantis.

== Company ==
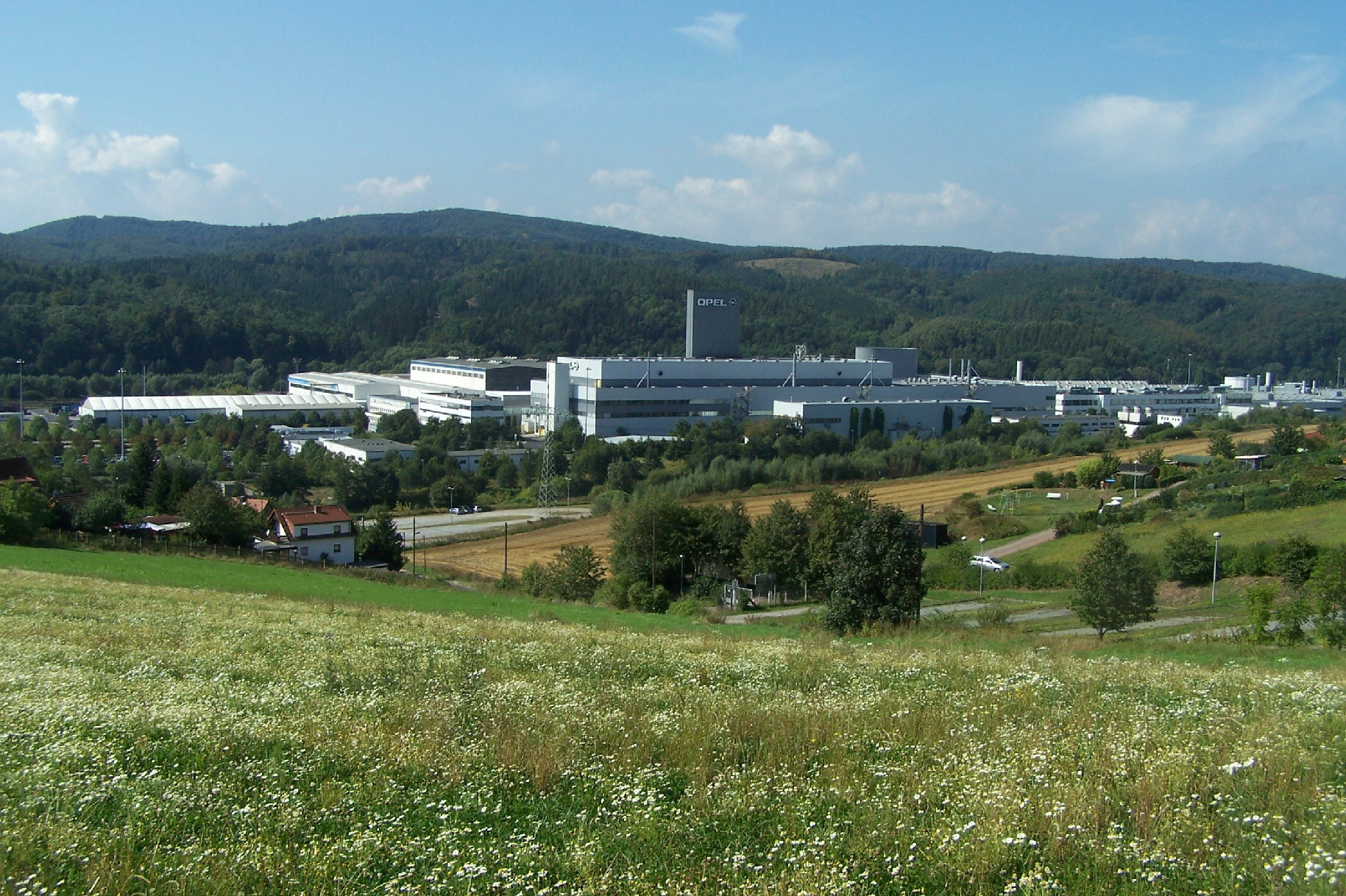
Assembly plant in Eisenach

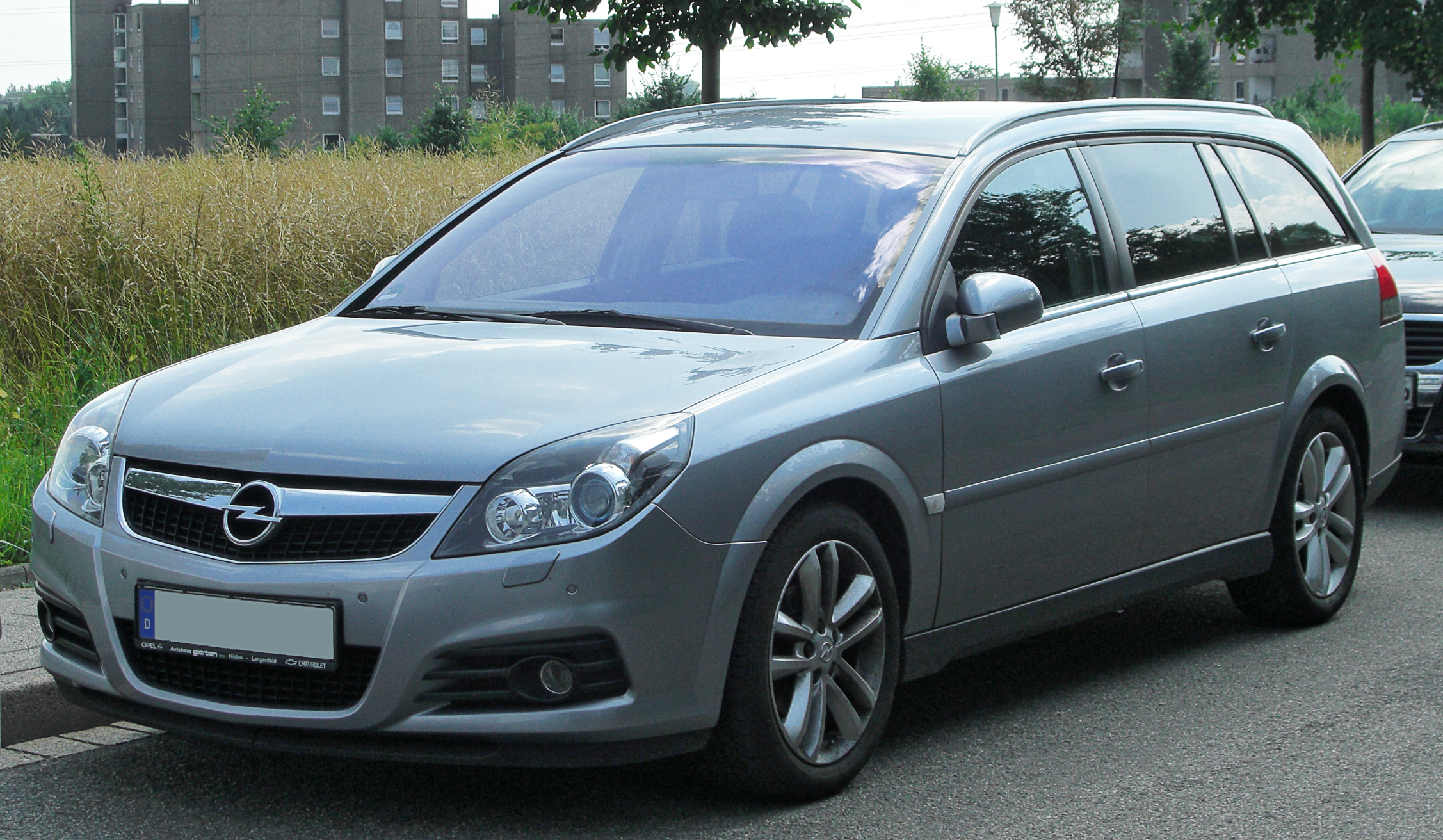
The Opel Vectra C, in production from 2002 to 2008

Opel operates 10 vehicle, powertrain, and component plants and four development and test centres in six countries, and employs around 30,000 people in Europe. The brand sells vehicles in more than 60 markets worldwide. Other plants are in Eisenach and Kaiserslautern, Germany; Szentgotthárd, Hungary; Figueruelas, Spain; Gliwice, and Tychy, Poland; Aspern, Austria; Ellesmere Port, and Luton, United Kingdom. The Dudenhofen Test Center is located near the company's headquarters and is responsible for all technical testing and vehicle validations.

Around 6,250 people are responsible for the engineering and design of Opel/Vauxhall vehicles at the International Technical Development Center and European Design Center in Rüsselsheim. All in all, Opel plays an important role in Stellantis' global R&D footprint.

=== Leadership ===
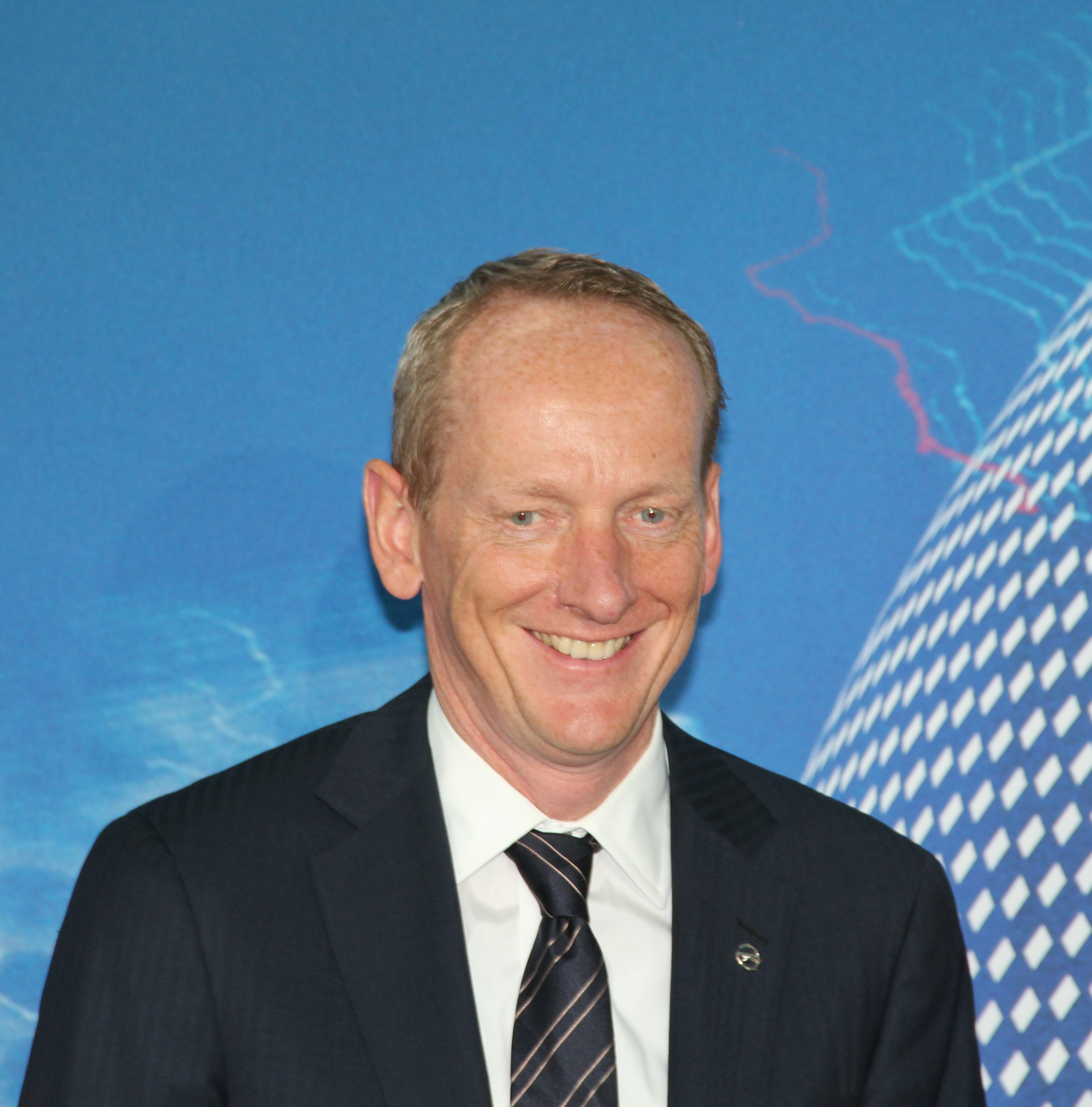
Dr. Karl-Thomas Neumann, CEO of the Opel Group from March 2013 to June 2017

Chairmen/CEOs of Adam Opel AG/GmbH since 1948
Name	From	To
Edward W. Zdunek (Gaston de Wolff, acting chairman)	November 1948	February 1961
Nelson J. Stork	February 1961	March 1966
L. Ralph Mason	March 1966	1970
Alexander Cunningham	1970	January 1974
John P. McCormack	February 1974	February 1976
James F. Waters	March 1976	August 1980
Robert C. Stempel	September 1980	February 1982
Ferdinand Beickler	February 1982	February 1986
Horst W. Herke	February 1986	March 1989
Louis Hughes	April 1989	June 1992
David Herman	July 1992	June 1998
Gary Cowger	June 1998	October 1998
Robert Hendry	October 1998	March 2001
Carl-Peter Forster	April 2001	June 2004
Hans Demant	June 2004	January 2010
Nick Reilly	January 2010	March 2011
Karl-Friedrich Stracke	April 2011	July 2012
Thomas Sedran (interim chairman)	July 2012	February 2013
Dr. Karl-Thomas Neumann	March 2013	June 2017
Michael Lohscheller	June 2017	September 2021
Uwe Hochgeschurtz	September 2021	May 2022
Florian Huettl	Since June 2022	

=== Plants ===
Production site	Image	Production since	Products	Comments	Employees
Rüsselsheim am Main, Germany		1898	Astra	International Technical Development Center (ITDC); Headquarters of Opel Automobile GmbH; Dudenhofen Test Center	12.990
Kaiserslautern, Germany		1966	Components; Engines		2.150
Kikinda, Serbia (*Ex-Yugoslavia)		1977–1992	Car parts; Opel Kadett, Opel Omega, Opel Senator (also known as Opel Kikinda), Opel Vectra	IDA-Opel (Industry for car parts Opel)	?
Opel Eisenach GmbH; Eisenach, Germany		1990	Opel Grandland	1300 Employees for 3 Months from 1 October 2021 until 31 December 2021 at short-time work at home, due to factory closure because of a chip issue.	1.420
Figueruelas, near Zaragoza, Spain		1982	Corsa E (three-, four-, and five-door); Meriva B; Mokka; Corsa F; Opel Crossland (2017–present)		5.120
Gliwice, Poland		1998	Opel Astra K (5-door)		2.920
Opel Manufacturing Poland; Tychy, Poland		1996	Diesel engines		480
Opel Szentgotthárd; Szentgotthárd, Hungary		1990	Engines; Transmissions		810
Vauxhall Ellesmere Port; Ellesmere Port, United Kingdom		1962	Astra K Sports Tourer (estate/wagon)		1.630
IBC Vehicles Ltd; Luton, Great Britain		1907–2025	Vivaro B + Fiat Talento II + Nissan NV300 + Renault Trafic III	headquarters of Vauxhall	1.140
GM Auto LLC; Saint Petersburg, Russia		2008–2015	Astra J (five-door, saloon/sedan)		880

Plant controlled as first-tier subsidiary of General Motors Europe Limited, second-tier subsidiary of GM CME Holdings CV and third-tier subsidiary of General Motors Corporation (GMC):

Production site	Image	Production since	Products	Comments	Employees
Opel Wien GmbH; Aspern, Austria		1982–2024	Family 0 engines; Transmissions	Opel Wien in Austria also well known as its first name General Motors Austria	1.480

== Marketing ==
=== Logo ===
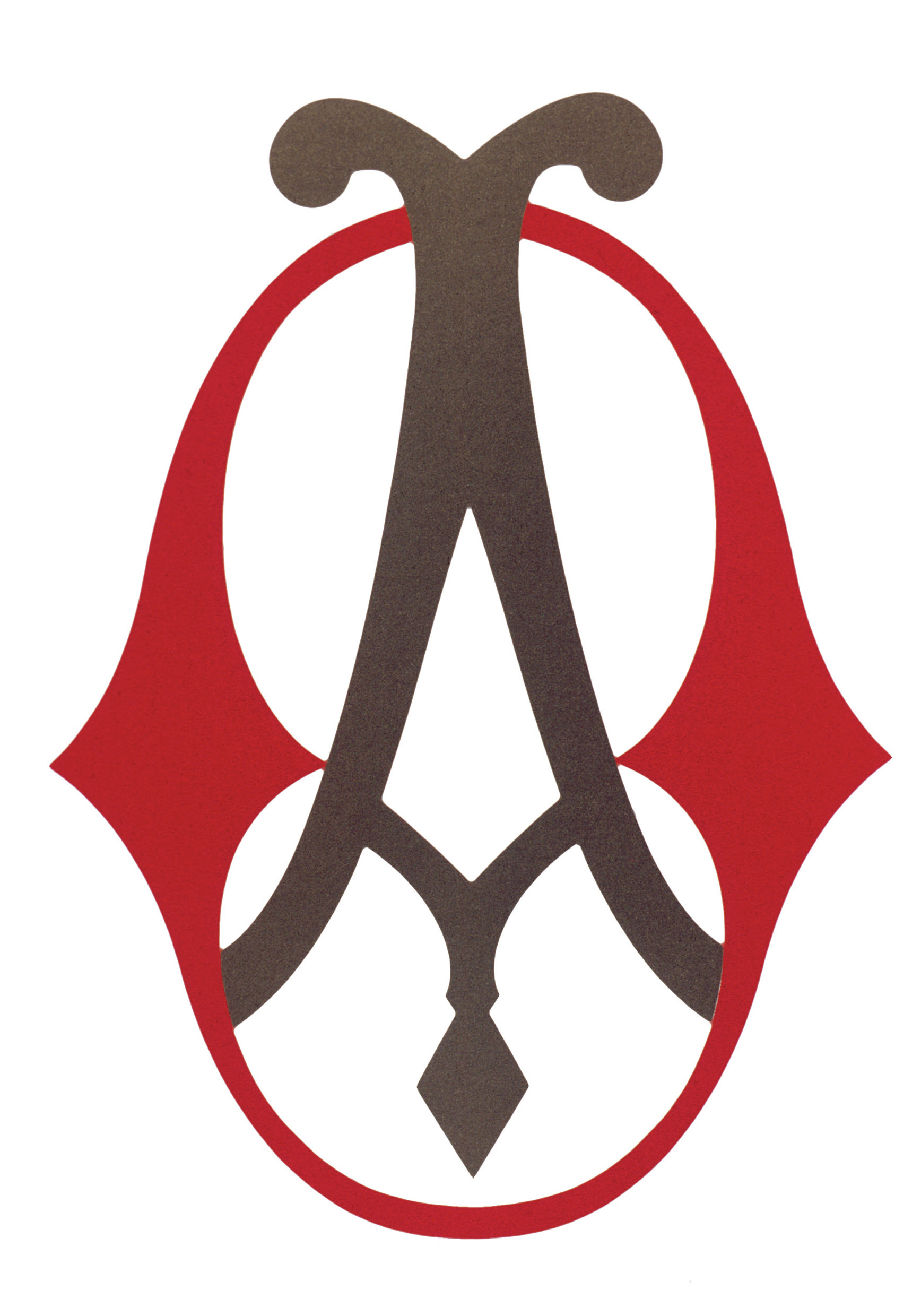
1862: Adam Opel's initials

Adam Opel began his manufacturing venture in Rüsselsheim, Germany, in 1862, initially producing sewing machines. To represent the brand, the earliest known logo featured a bronze "A" for Adam and a red "O" for Opel—his initials forming the foundation of the company's visual identity.

In 1866, Opel expanded and started to produce bicycles. Around 1890, the logo was redesigned. The new logo also contained the words "Victoria Blitz" (referring to Lady Victory; they were certain of the triumph of their bicycles). The word "Blitz" (English: lightning) first appeared back then, but without a depiction.

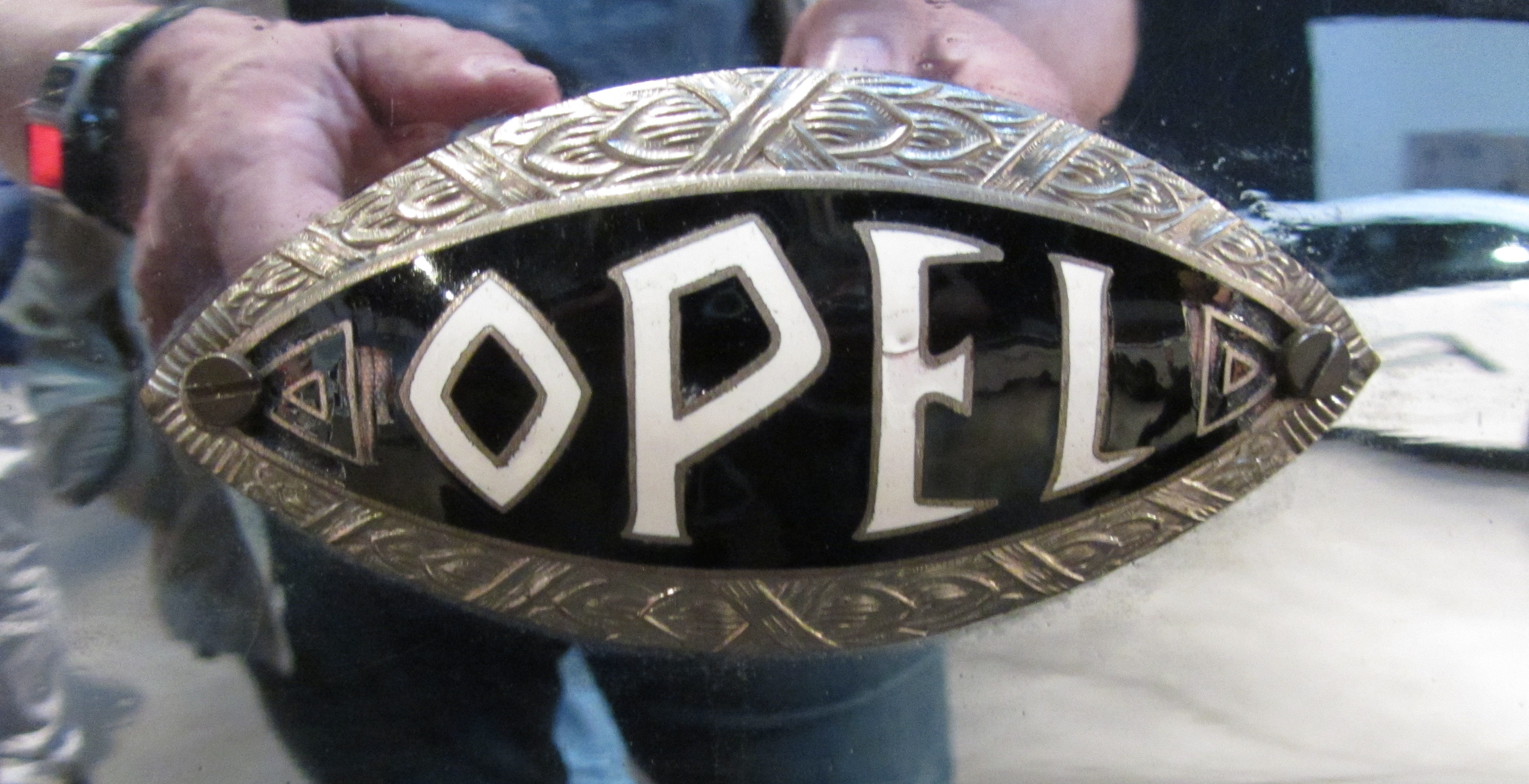
1910: the blue eye

Another redesign was commissioned in 1909. The new logo contained only the company name Opel, and was used on the motorcycles that they had started to produce in 1902, and on the first cars which were produced in 1909.

In 1910, the logo's shape was a pointed oval surrounded by laurels, with the text "Opel" in the centre.

In the 1930s, passenger car hood ornaments had the appearance of a stylized airship; this later appeared on emblems, with the object passing through a ring.

Besides the hood ornament flying through the ring, Opel also used a coat of arms in various forms, which mostly had a combination of white and yellow colours in it, a shade of yellow which is typical for Opel until today. One was oval, half white and half yellow. The Opel writing was black and in the middle of the oval symbol.

The origin of the lightning in the Opel logo was the Opel Blitz truck (German Blitz = English "lightning"), which had been a commercial success. Originally, the logo for this truck consisted of two stripes arranged loosely like a lightning symbol with the words "Opel" and "Blitz" in them. 1950s models simplified this to the horizontal bolt of lightning which appears in the current Opel logo. The lightning always follows the original from the "Opel Blitz" text stripes, in the form of a horizontally stretched letter "Z".

By the end of the 1960s, the two forms merged, and the lightning replaced the "flying thing in the ring", giving way to the basic design which is used since then with variations.

In the 1964 version, the lightning with a ring was used in a yellow rectangle, with the Opel writing below. The basic form and proportions of the Blitz logo have remained unchanged since the 1970 version, which made the lightning tails shorter so that the logo could fit proportionately within a yellow square, meaning it could be displayed next to the 'blue square' General Motors logo. In the mid-1970s, the Vauxhall "Griffin" logo was, in turn, resized and displayed within a corresponding red square, so that all three logos could be displayed together, signifying the unified GM Europe.

Evolution of hood ornament flying through ring

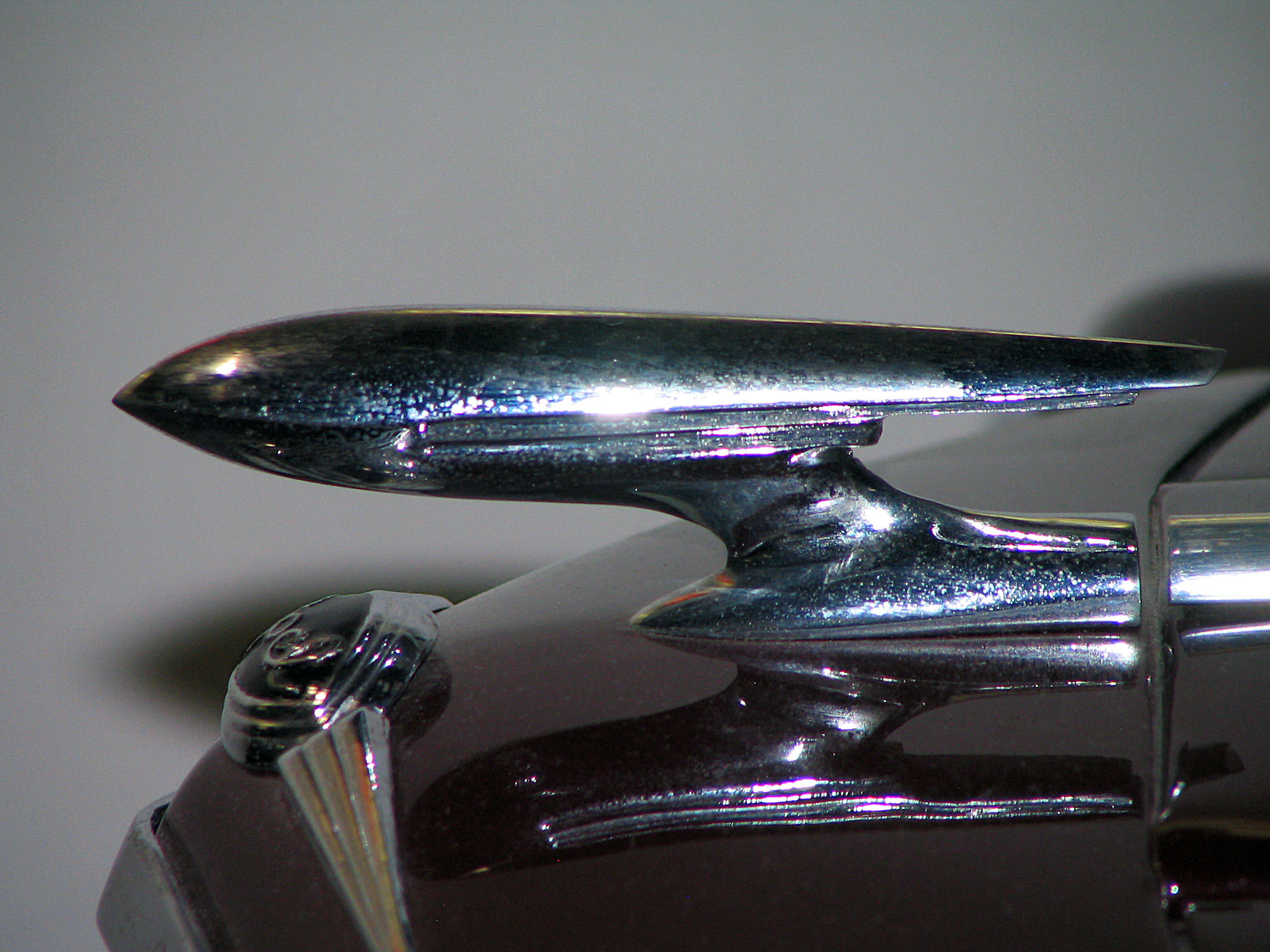
Hood ornament of the Opel Olympia (1935–37)

Hood ornament flying through the ring (1937)

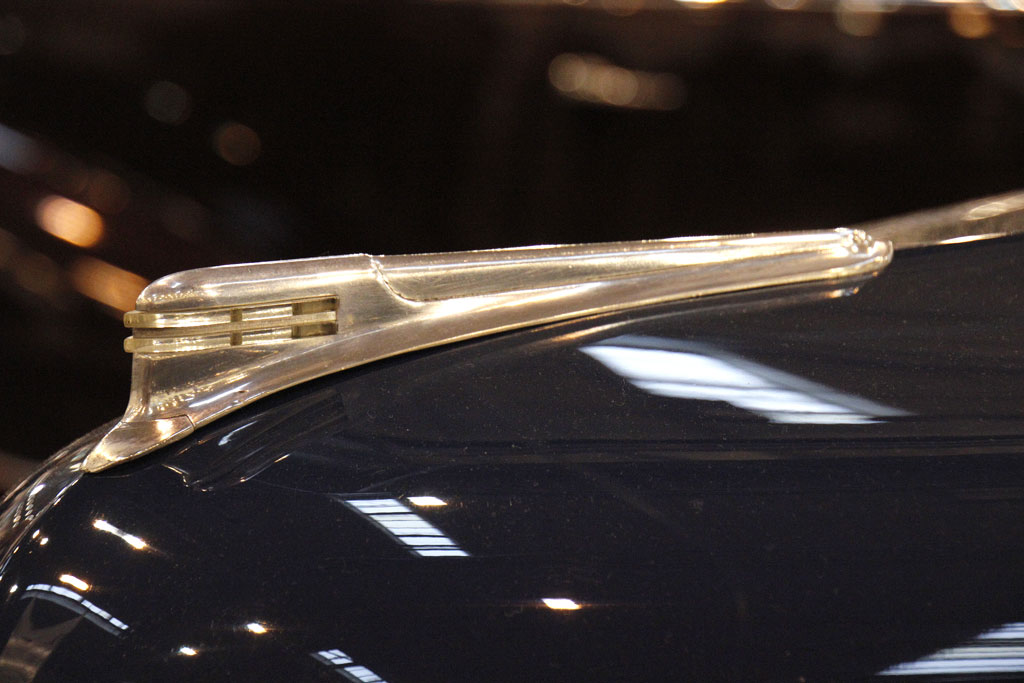
Hood ornament of a 1937 Opel car, typical for many other Opels at the time

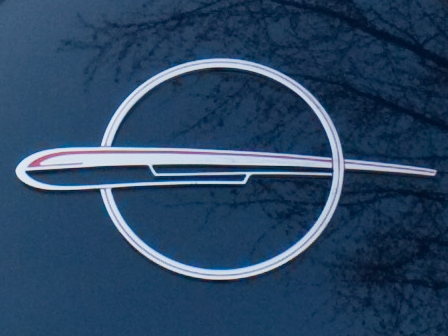
Logo on spare wheel cover of a 1938 Kapitän

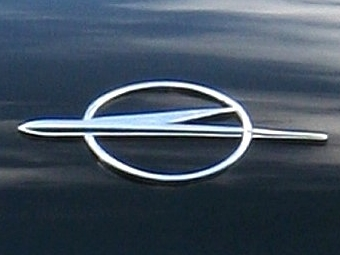
Logo on the rear of a 1951 Kapitän

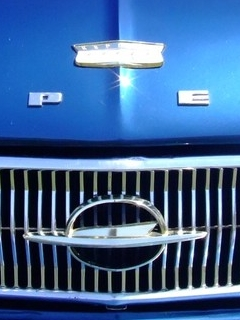
1959 Opel Kapitän
The lightning of the Opel Blitz replacing the hood ornament

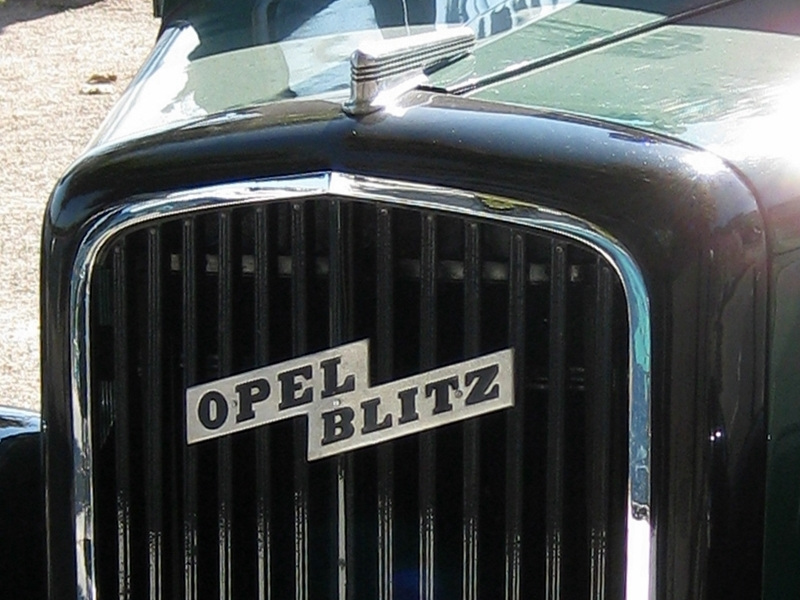
Early 1950s Opel Blitz with words in horizontal lightning

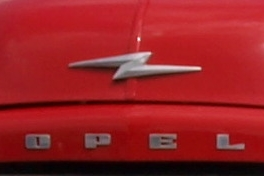
1961 Opel Blitz with stylised horizontal lightning

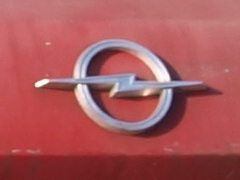
Basic form of current logo on a 1968 Opel Blitz

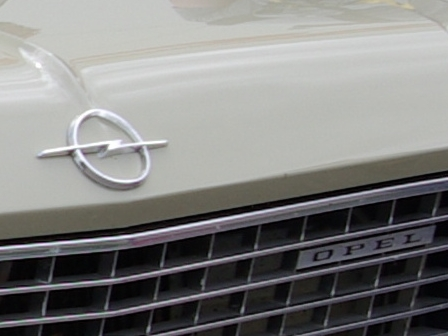
Lightning in ring on a 1969 Opel Kapitän

1970-1987 version; the "Opel" script was dropped in 1981.

Opel logo (2002–2007)

Opel logo (2009–2017)

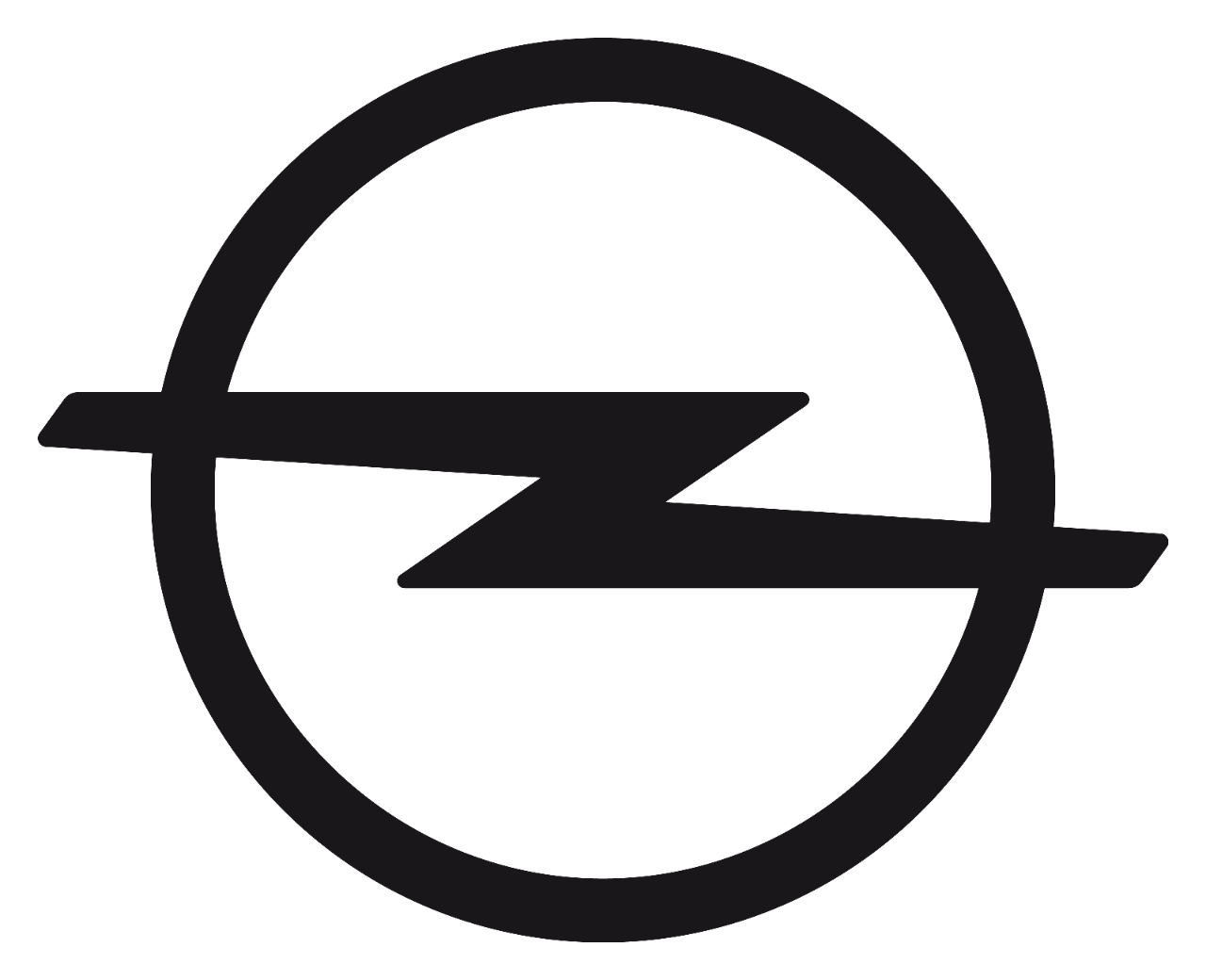
Opel logo (2017–2020)

Opel logo (2020–2023)

Opel logo (Since 2023)

=== Clubs ===
The SC Opel Rüsselsheim is a football club with over 450 members. RV 1888 Opel Rüsselsheim is a cycling club.

=== Slogans ===
Opel's corporate tagline as of June 2017 is The Future Is Everyone's (German: Die Zukunft gehört allen). The list of Opel's slogans is shown below:

- Fresh thinking – better cars. (2002–2007)
- Discover Opel (2007–2009)
- Wir Leben Autos. (2009–2017)
- The Future is Everyone's (2017–present)

=== Partnerships ===
Opel currently has partnerships with association football clubs such as Bundesliga clubs Borussia Dortmund and 1. FSV Mainz 05. Opel cooperates with French oil and gas company TotalEnergies on plans for a battery cell factory. From 1994 until 2006, Opel has been partnership with Milan and previously with Fiorentina from 1983 until 1986 in Italy, from 1995 until 2002 with Paris Saint-Germain in France, from 1989 until 2002 with FC Bayern Munich in Germany and from 2013 until 2017 with Feyenoord Rotterdam in Netherlands.

== World presence ==
The Opel brand is present in most of Europe, parts of North Africa, South Africa, the Middle East (EMEA), Chile, Colombia, Ecuador, Uruguay, Japan, Singapore, Taiwan, and New Zealand. Their models have been rebadged and sold in other countries and continents, such as Vauxhall in Great Britain, and previously, Chevrolet in Latin America, Holden in Australia and New Zealand, and Saturn in the United States and Canada. Following the demise of General Motors Corporation's Saturn division in North America, Opel cars were rebadged and sold in the United States, Canada, Mexico, and China under the Buick name with models such as the Opel Insignia/Buick Regal, Opel Astra sedan/Buick Verano (both which share underpinnings with the Chevrolet Cruze), and Opel Mokka/Buick Encore.

In 2017, GM confirmed plans of a "hybrid global brand" which includes Vauxhall, Opel and Buick to use more synergies between the brands. This plan was overridden by the sale of Vauxhall and Opel brands to PSA Peugeot Citroën.

=== North America ===
==== United States ====
Opel cars appeared under their own name in the U.S. from 1958 to 1975, when they were sold through Buick dealers as captive imports. The best-selling Opel models in the U.S. were the 1964 to 1972 Opel Kadett, the 1971 to 1975 Opel Manta, and the 1968 to 1973 Opel GT. (The name "Opel" was also applied from 1976 to 1980 to vehicles manufactured by Isuzu (similar to the "Isuzu I-Mark"), but mechanically those were entirely different cars).

Historically, Opel vehicles have also been sold at various times in the North American market as either heavily modified, or "badge-engineered" models under the Chevrolet, Buick, Pontiac, Saturn, and Cadillac brands – for instance the J-body platform, which was largely developed by Opel – was the basis of North American models such as the Chevrolet Cavalier and Cadillac Cimarron. Below is a list of the most recent Opel models which were sold under GM's North American brands.

===== Buick Regal (fifth generation, 2009–2017, and sixth generation, 2018–2020) =====
The last two generations of the Buick Regal have been rebadged versions of the Opel Insignia. The main differences are the modified radiator grill and the altered colour of the passenger compartment illumination (blue instead of red). The Regal GS is comparable to the Insignia OPC. The 5th generation Buick Regal was first assembled alongside the Insignia at the Opel plant in Rüsselsheim. In the first quarter of 2011, it began to be built on the flexible assembly line at the GM plant in Oshawa, Ontario, Canada. All 6th generation Buick Regals were built alongside the Insignia at the Opel plant in Rüsselsheim, Germany.

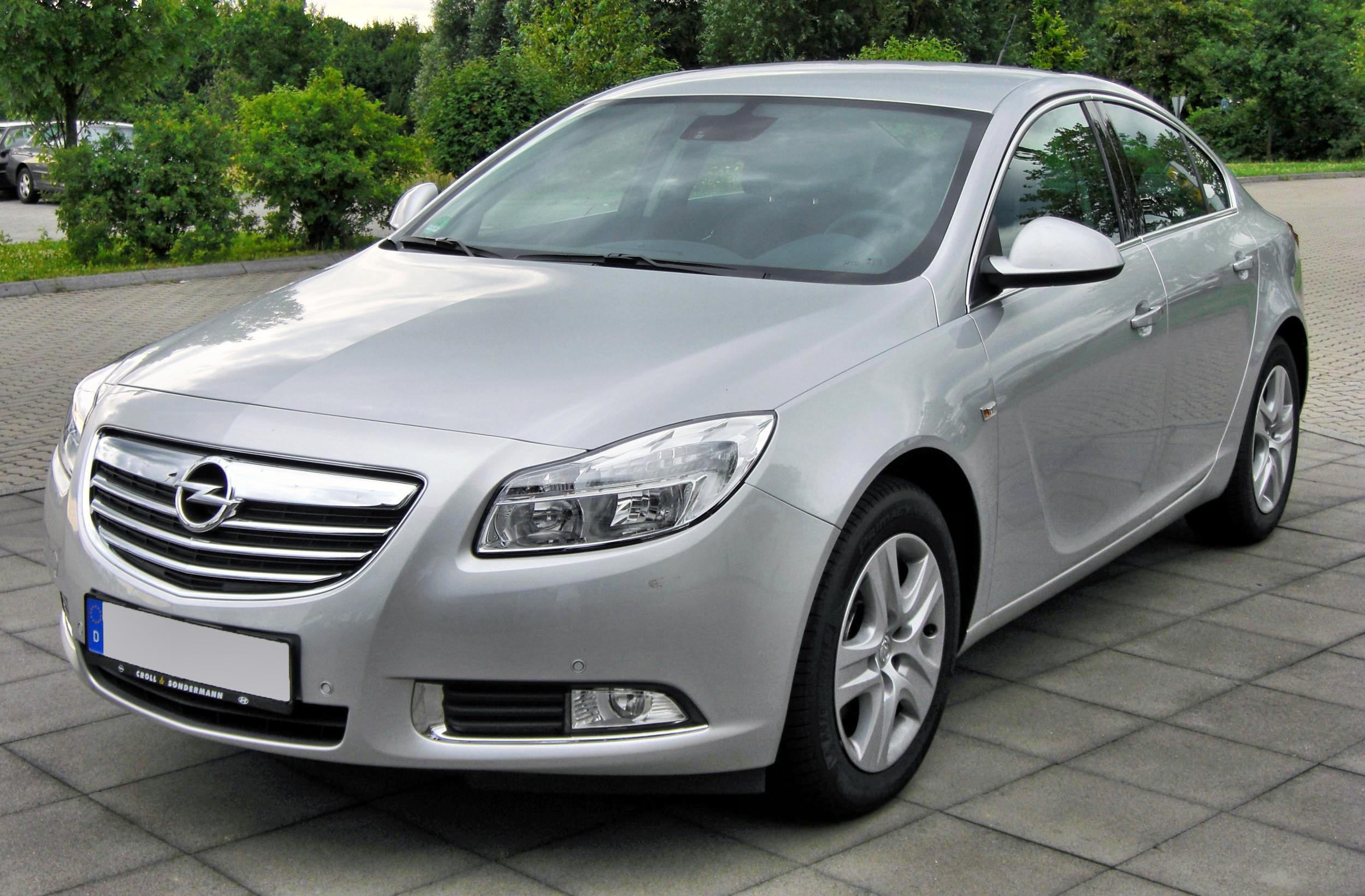
Opel Insignia 1st gen

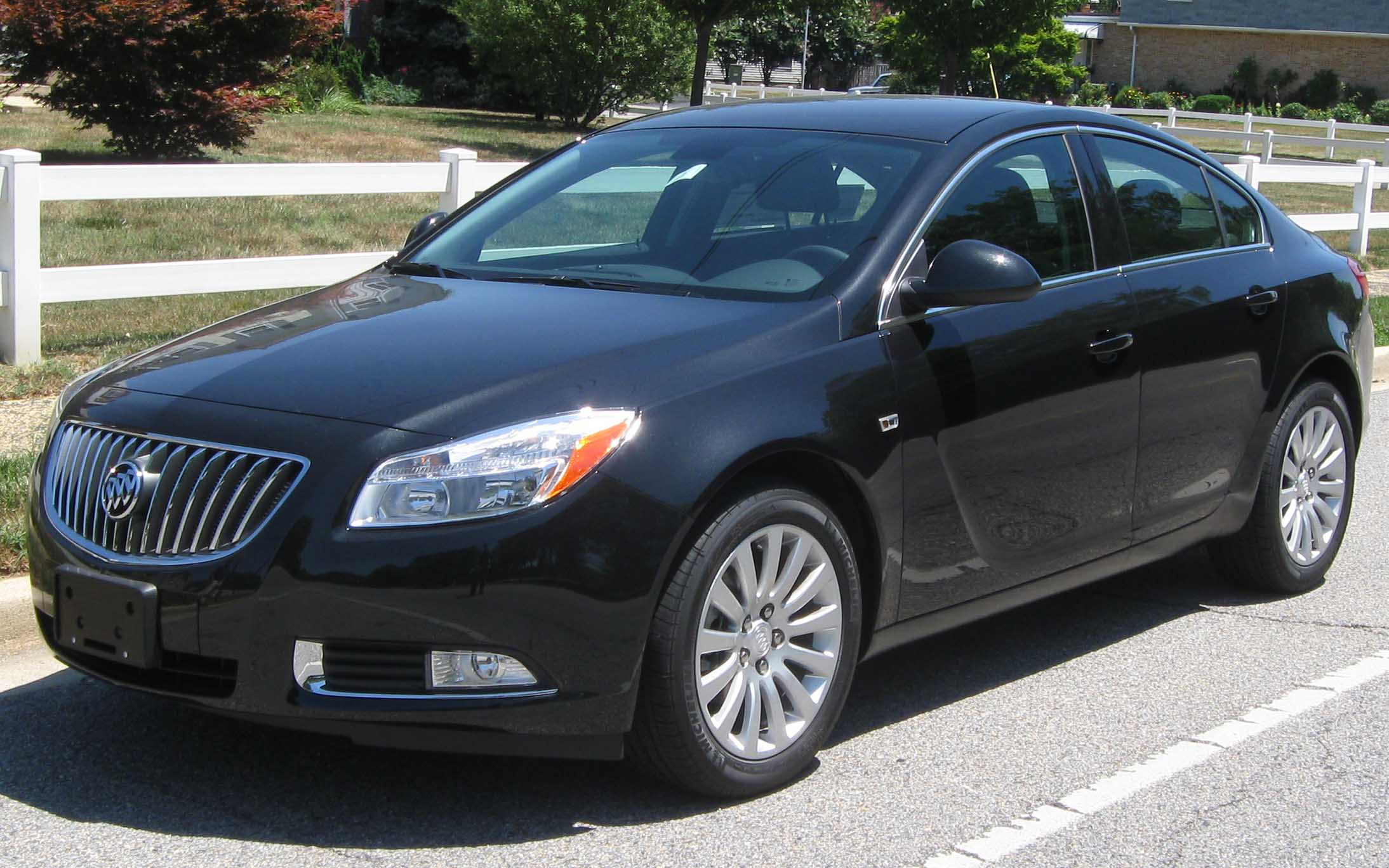
Buick Regal 5th gen

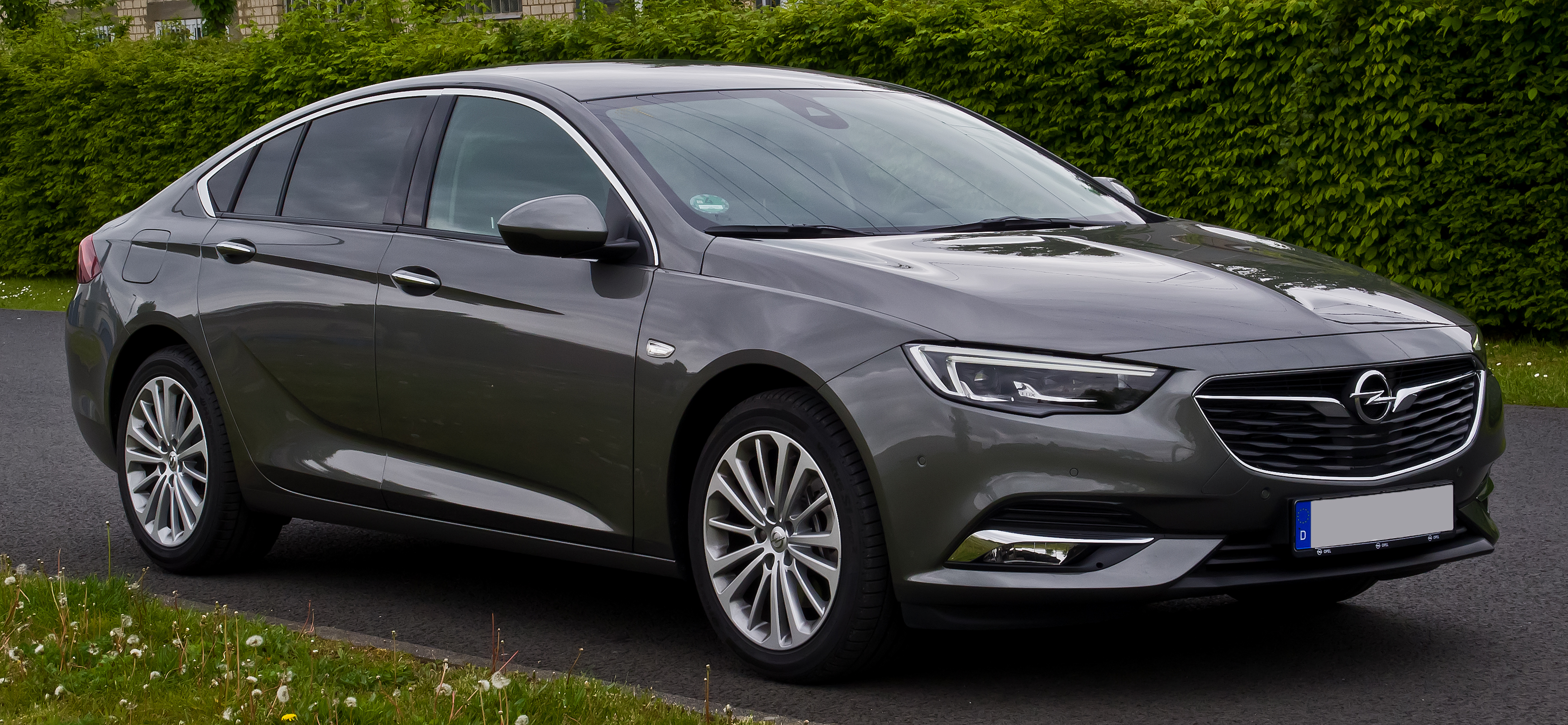
Opel Insignia 2nd gen

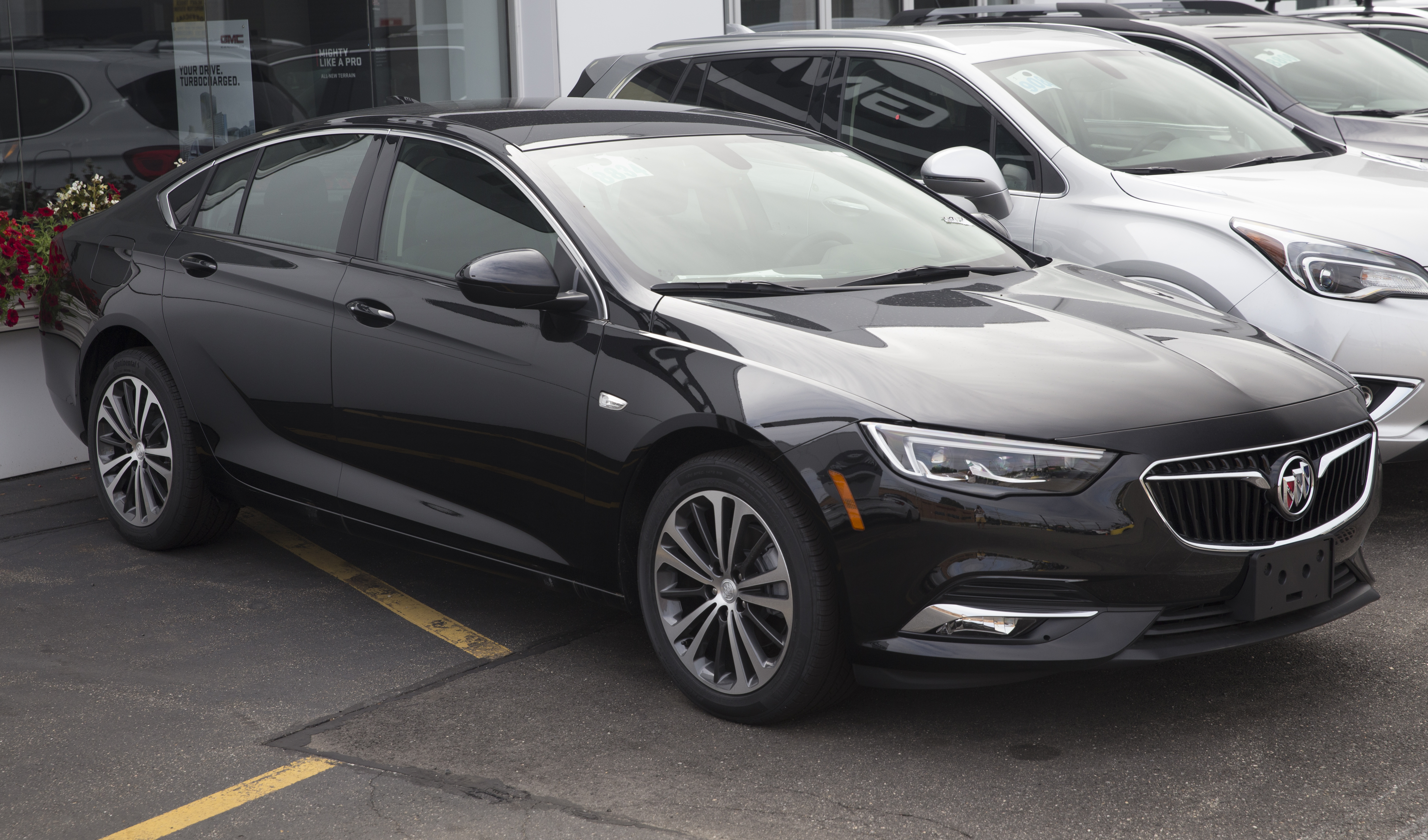
Buick Regal 6th gen

===== Buick Cascada =====
The Buick Cascada was a rebadged Opel Cascada, built in Poland and sold in the United States unchanged from the Opel in all but badging.

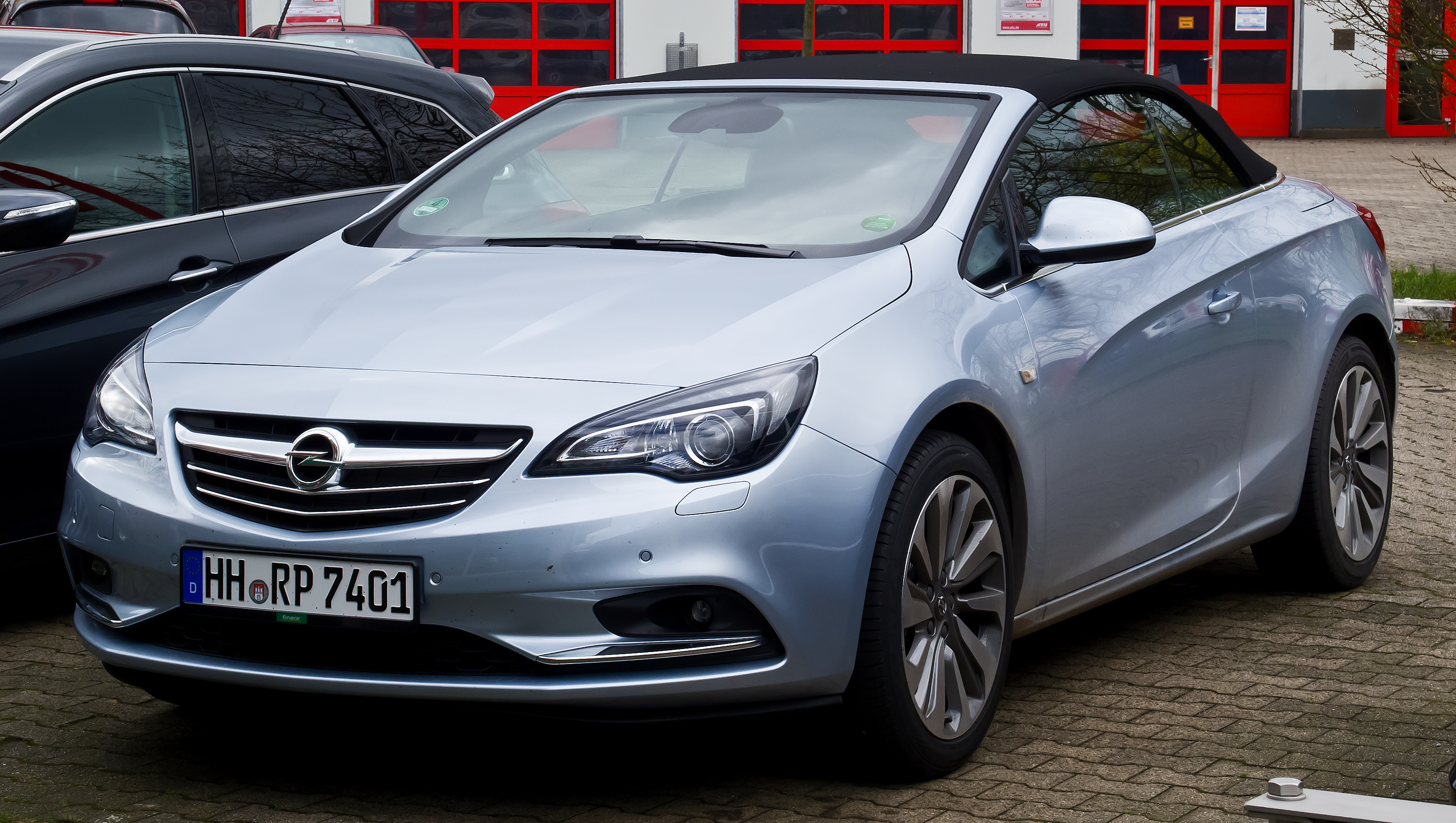
Opel Cascada

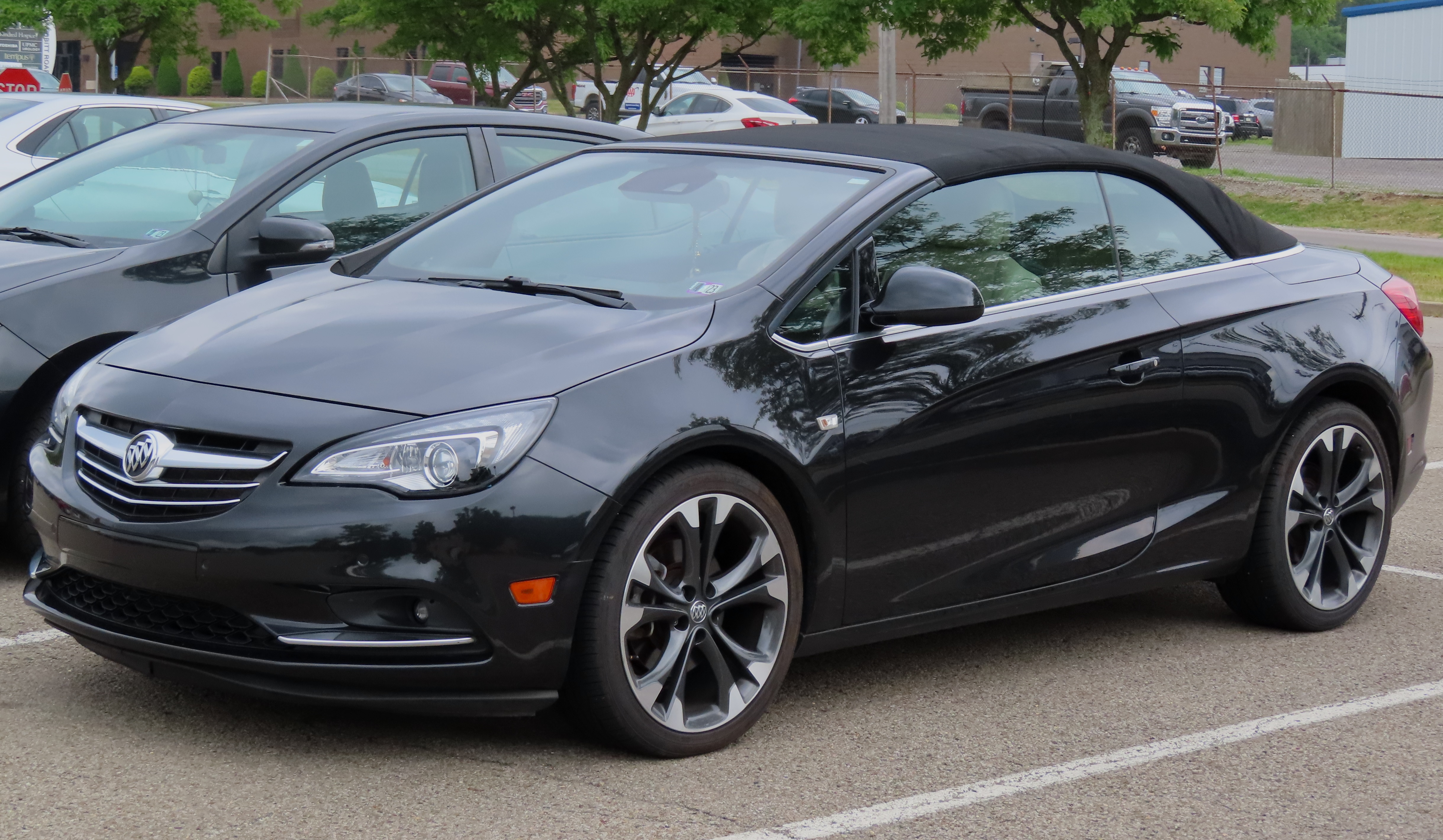
Buick Cascada

===== Buick LaCrosse =====
Unlike the vehicles listed above, the Buick LaCrosse was not a rebadged version of an Opel model. However, it was based on a long-wheelbase version of the Opel-developed Epsilon II-platform, so shared many key components with the Opel Insignia and thereby the Buick Regal.

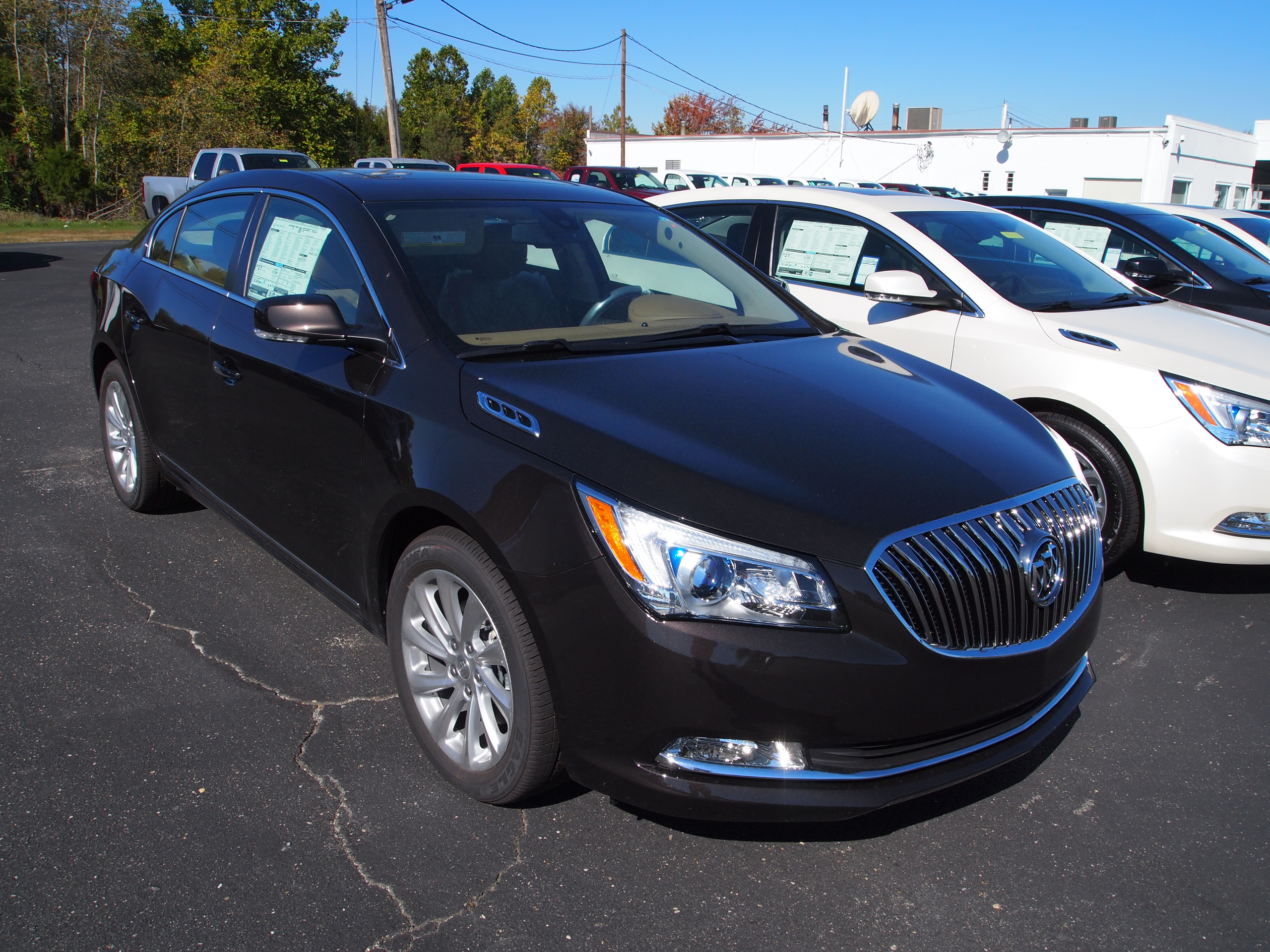
2014 Buick LaCrosse

===== Saturn Astra (2008–2009) =====
The Astra H was sold in the US as the Saturn Astra for model years 2008 and 2009.

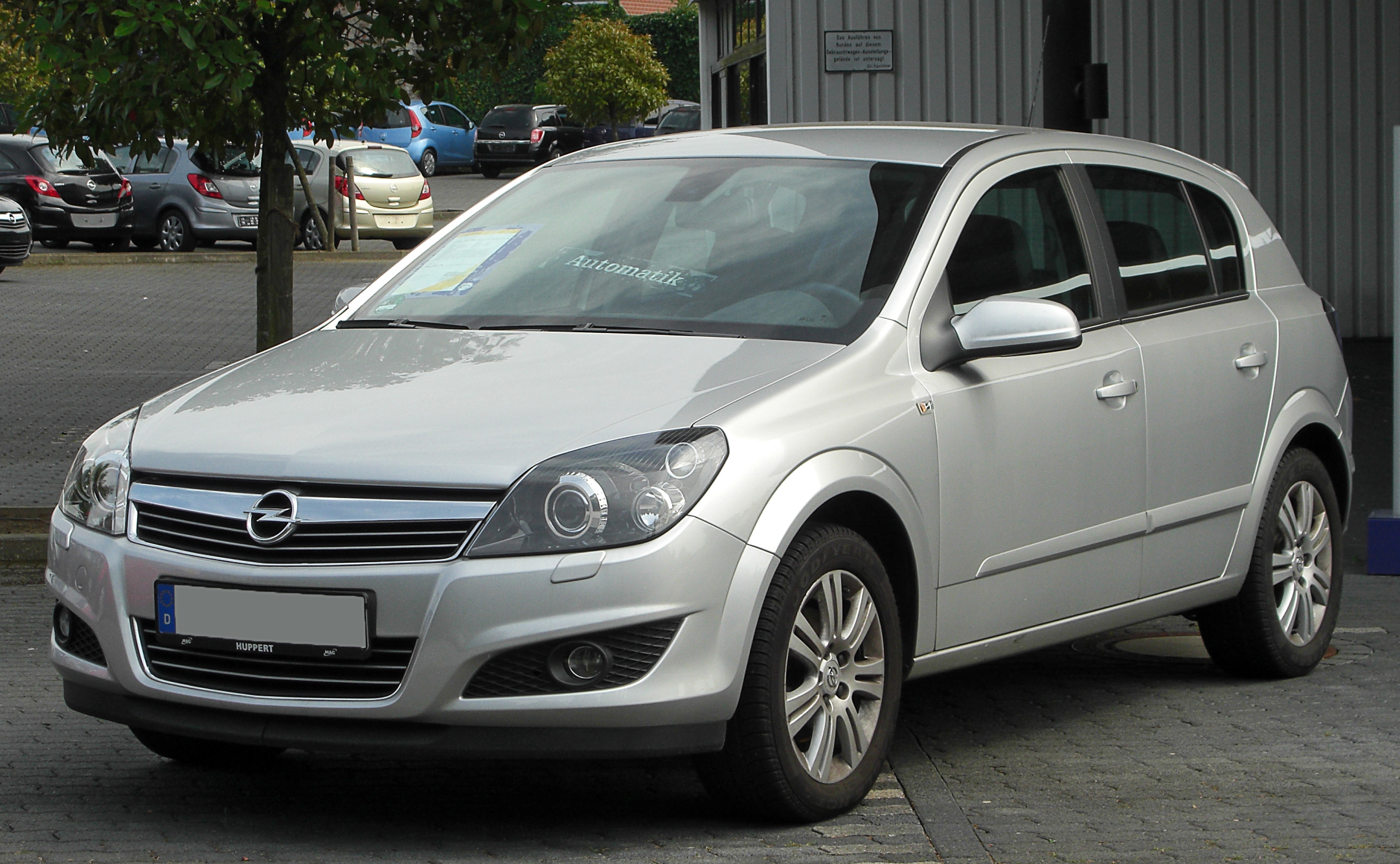
Opel Astra five-door

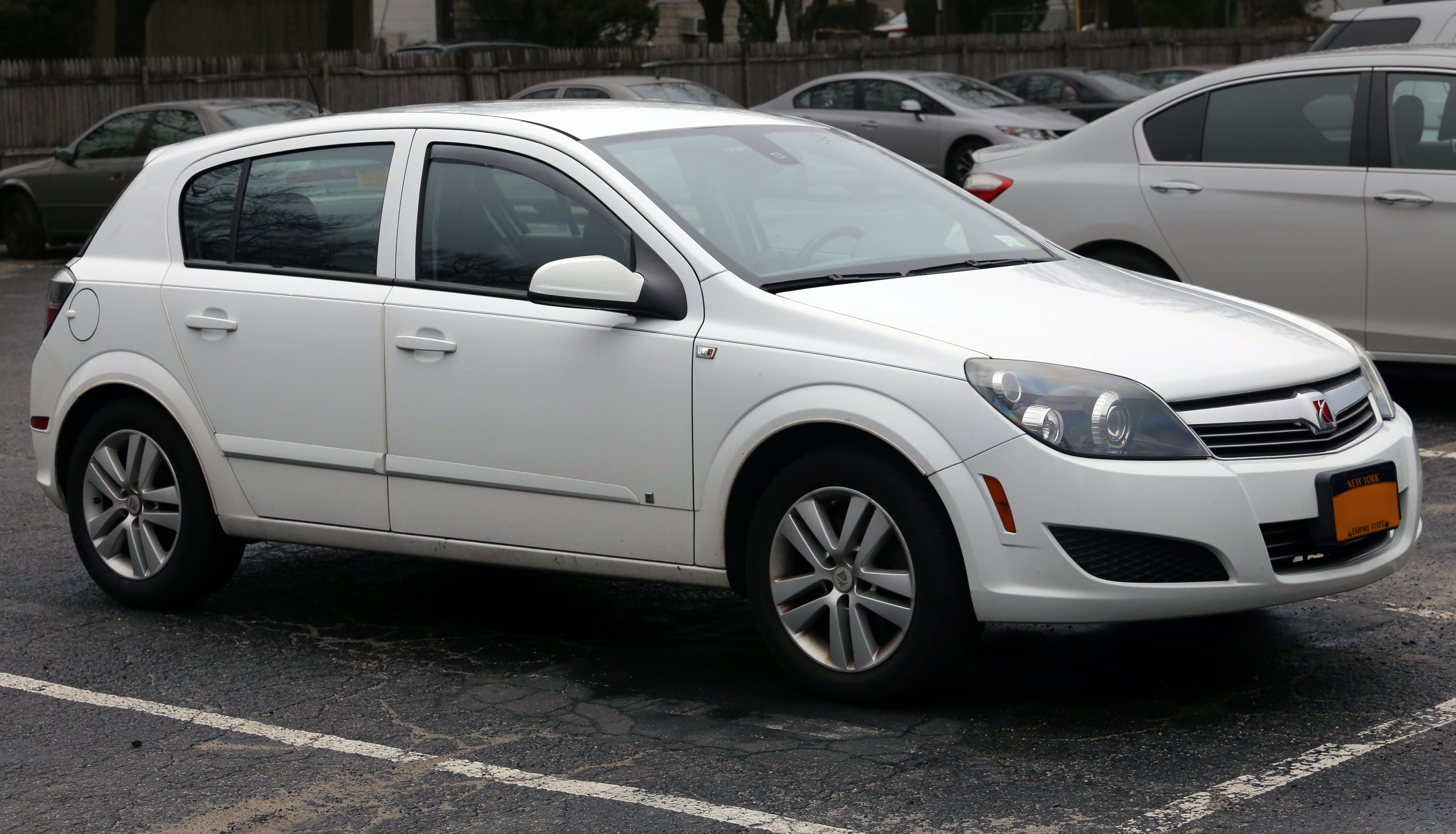
Saturn Astra XE five-door

===== Saturn L-Series (2000–2005) =====
The Saturn L-Series was a modified version of the Opel Vectra B. Though the Saturn had different exterior styling and had plastic door panels, it shared the same body shape as the Opel. Both cars rode on the GM2900 platform. The Saturn also had a different interior, yet shared some interior parts, such as the inside of the doors.

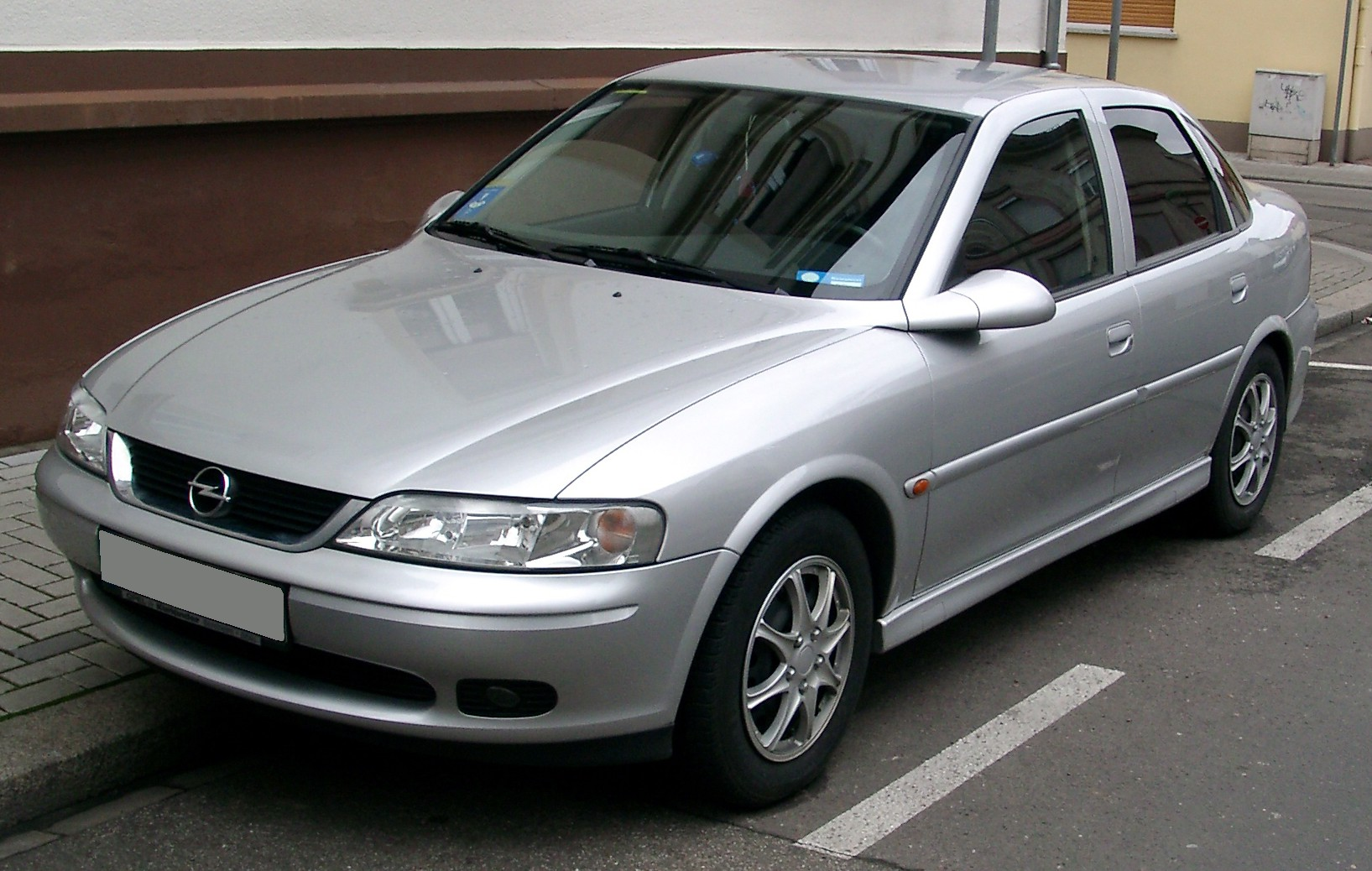
Opel Vectra B Sedan

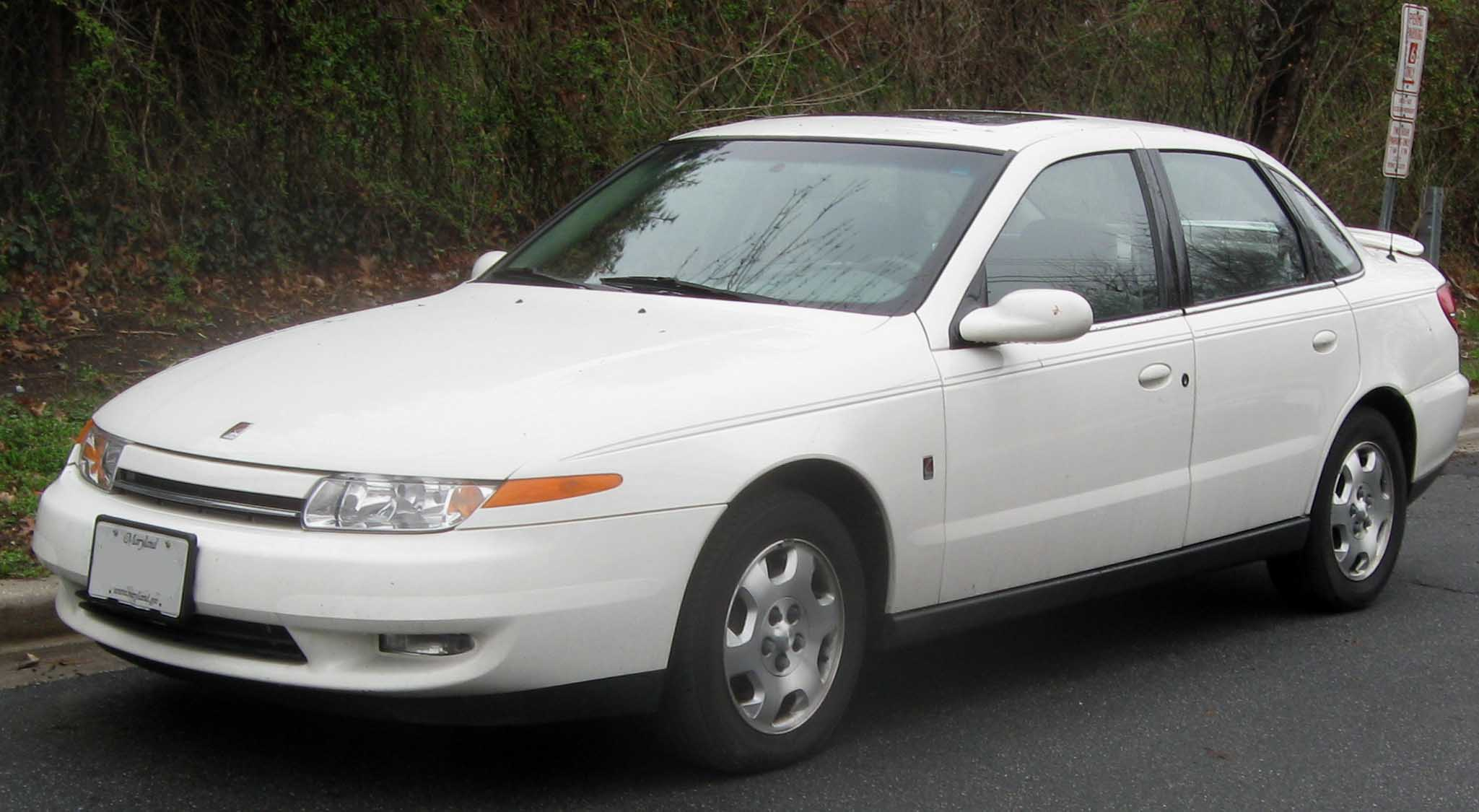
Saturn L-Series Sedan

===== Saturn VUE (2nd generation, 2008–2010), Chevrolet Captiva Sport =====
The second generation of the Saturn VUE, introduced in 2007 for the 2008 model year, was a rebadged version of the German-designed Opel Antara, manufactured in Mexico. After the demise of the Saturn brand, the VUE was discontinued, but the car continued to be produced and sold as Chevrolet Captiva Sport in Mexican and South American markets. The Chevrolet Captiva Sport was introduced for the US commercial and fleet markets in late 2011 for the 2012 model.

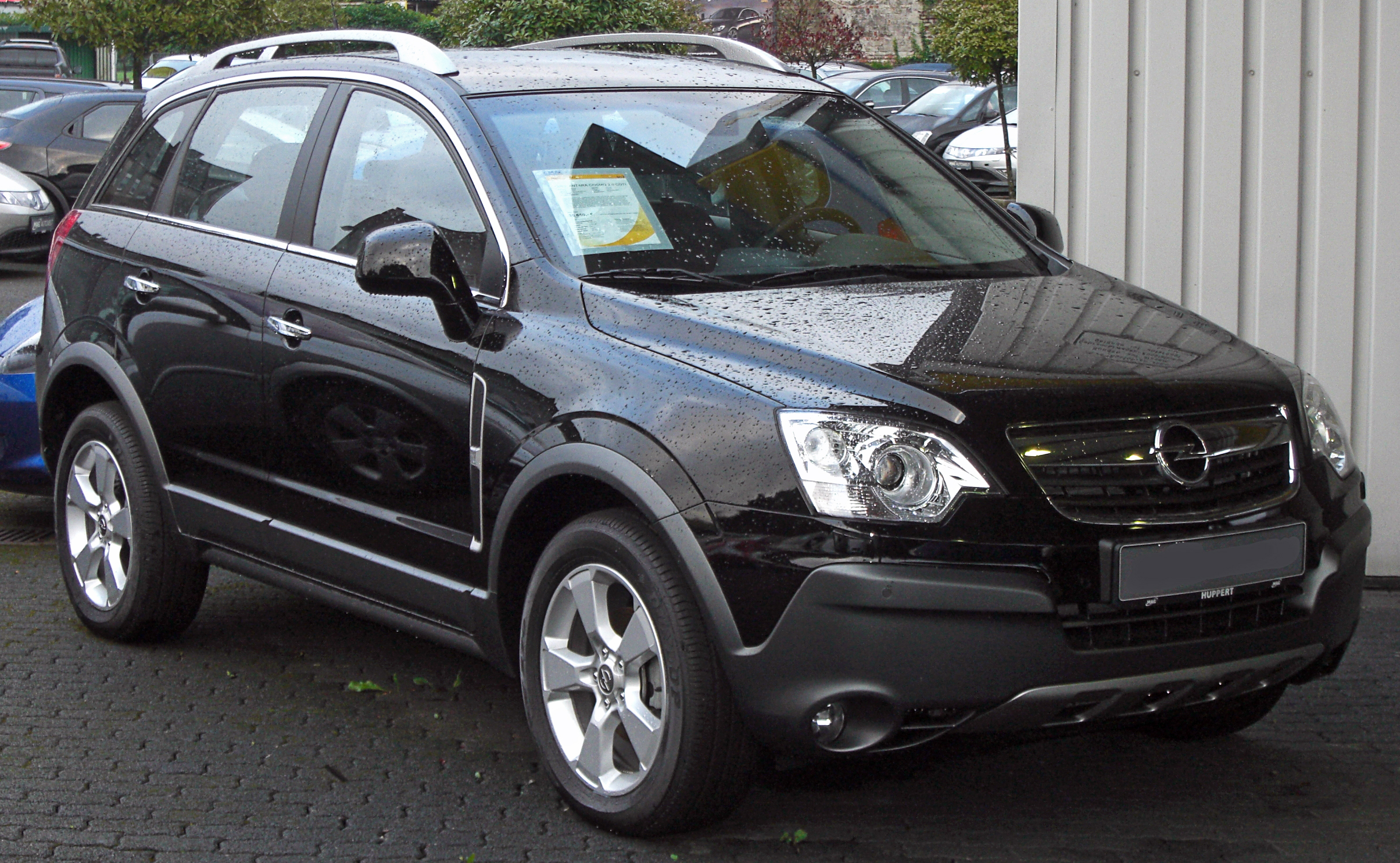
Opel Antara

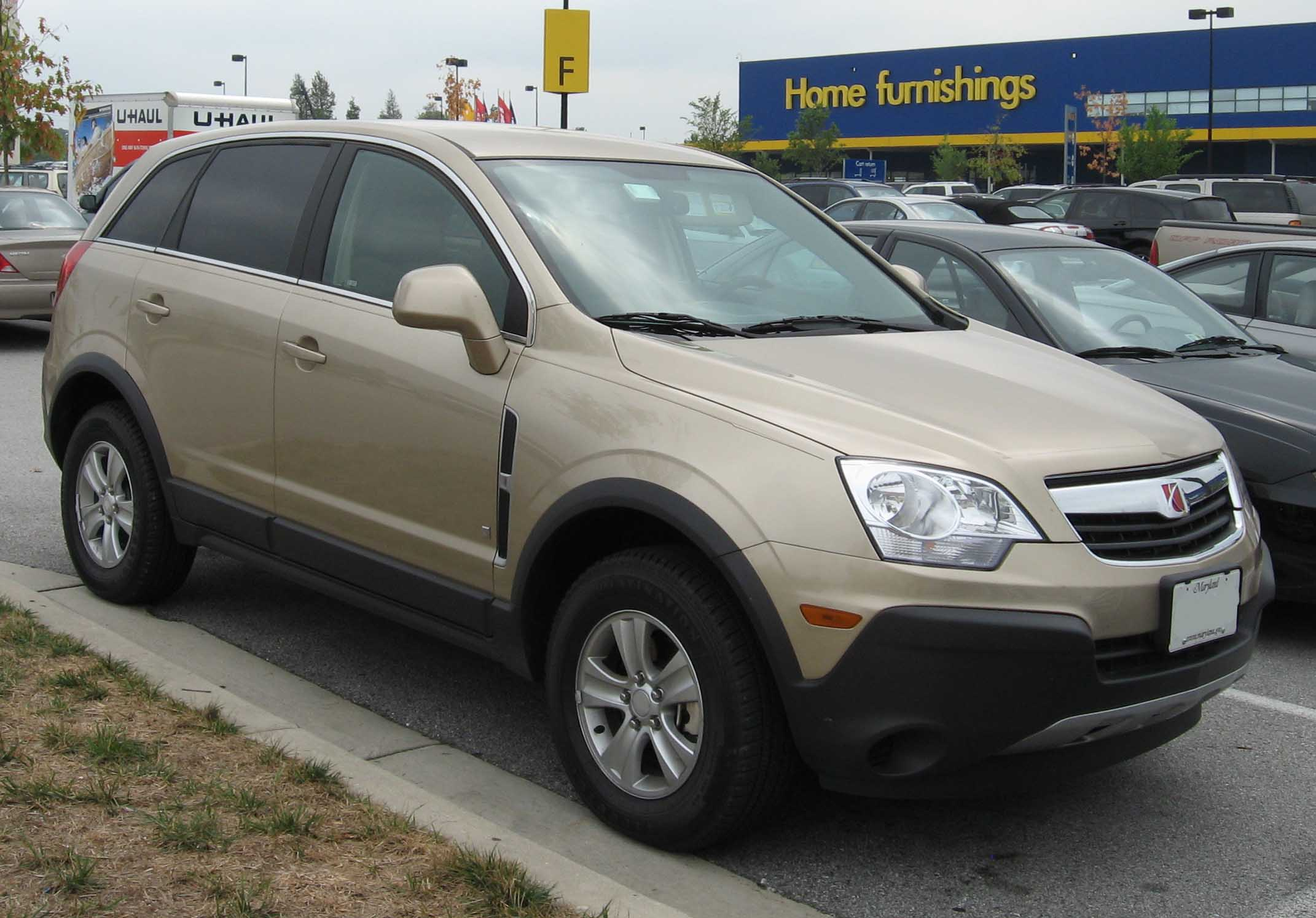
Saturn VUE

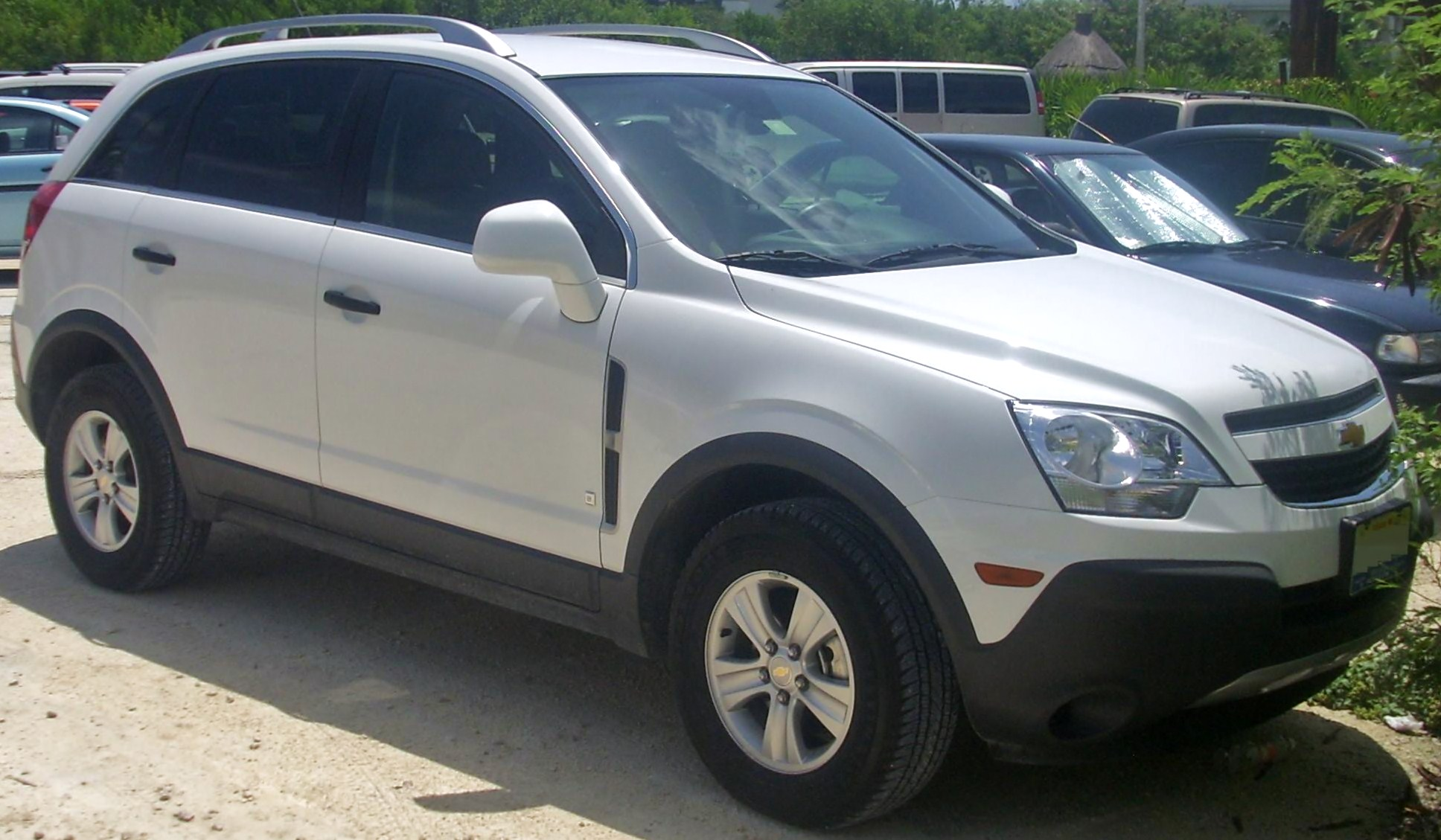
Chevrolet Captiva Sport

===== Cadillac Catera (1997–2001) =====
The Opel Omega B was sold in the US as the Cadillac Catera.

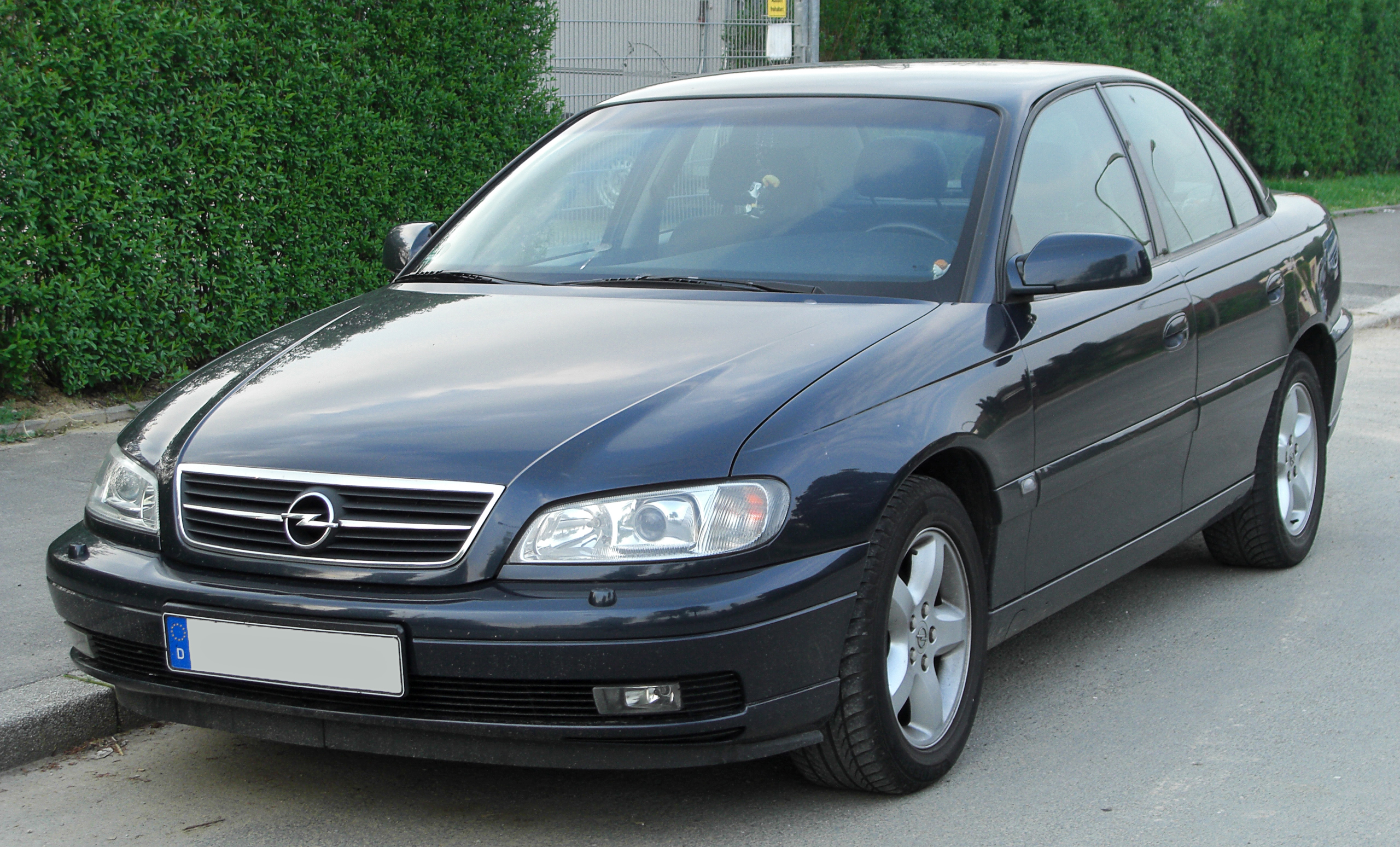
Opel Omega

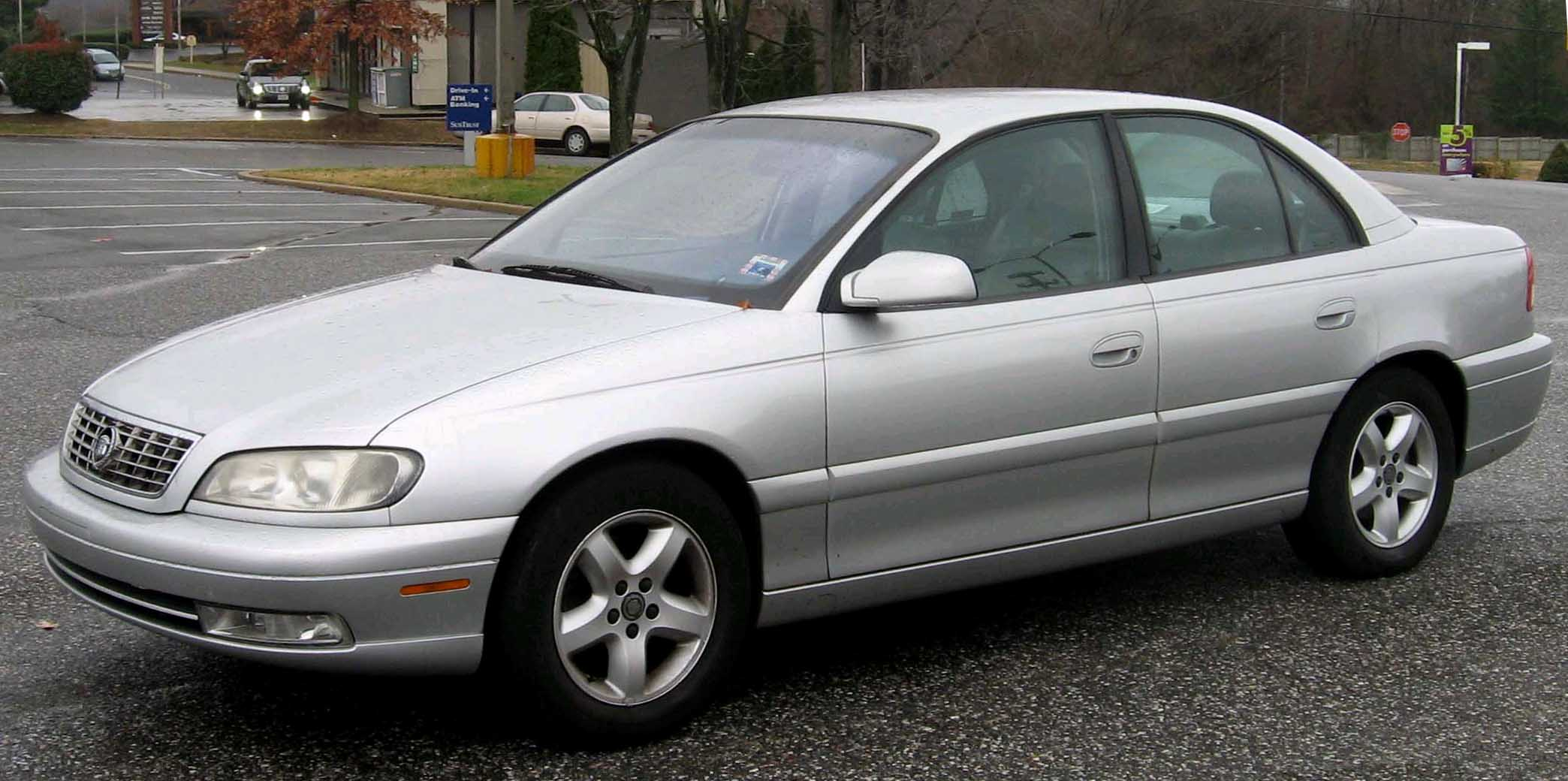
Cadillac Catera

=== Africa ===
Opel exports a variety of models to Algeria, Egypt, Morocco, South Africa, and Tunisia.

==== South Africa ====
The 2015 Opel range in South Africa comprises the Opel Adam, Opel Astra, Opel Corsa, Opel Meriva, Opel Mokka, and Opel Vivaro. No diesel versions are offered.

From 1986 to 2003, Opel models were produced by Delta Motor Corporation, a company created through a management buyout following of GM's divestment from apartheid South Africa. Delta assembled the Opel Kadett, with the sedan version called the Opel Monza. This was replaced by the Opel Astra, although the Kadett name was retained for the hatchback and considered a separate model. A version of the Rekord Series E remained in production after the model had been replaced by the Omega in Europe, as was a Commodore model unique to South Africa, combining the bodyshell of the Rekord with the front end of the revised Senator. The Opel Corsa was introduced in 1996, with kits of the Brazilian-designed sedan and pick-up (known in South African English as a bakkie) being locally assembled.

Although GM's passenger vehicle line-up in South Africa consisted of Opel-based models by the late 1970s, these were sold under the Chevrolet brand name, with only the Kadett being marketed as an Opel when it was released in 1980. In 1982, the Chevrolet brand name was dropped, with the Ascona, Rekord, Commodore, and Senator being rebadged as Opels.

=== Oceania ===
Many Opel models or models based on Opel architectures have been sold in Australia and New Zealand under the Holden marque, such as the Holden Barina (1994–2005), which were rebadged versions of the Opel Corsa, the Holden Astra, a version of the Opel Astra, and the Captiva 5, a version of the Opel Antara. In New Zealand, the Opel Kadett and Ascona were sold as niche models by General Motors New Zealand in the 1980s, while the Opel brand was used on the Opel Vectra until 1994.

For the first time ever, the Opel brand was introduced to Australia on 1 September 2012, including the Corsa, Astra, Astra GTC, and Insignia models. On 2 August 2013, Opel announced it was ending exports to Australia due to poor sales, with only 1,530 vehicles sold in the first ten months.

After the closure of Opel Australia, Holden imported newer Opel models such as the Astra GTC (ceased 1 May 2017), Astra VXR (Astra OPC), Cascada (ceased 1 May 2017), and Insignia VXR (Insignia OPC, ceased 1 May 2017), under the Holden badge. The 2018 5th-gen Holden Commodore ZB is a badge-engineered Opel Insignia, replacing the Australian-made, rear-wheel-drive Commodore with the German-made front-wheel/all-wheel-drive Insignia platform; however this model is no longer offered since the closure of Holden.

Opel returned to the New Zealand market in 2022, backed by the existing importer of the Peugeot and Citroën brands. Opel's New Zealand model line-up consists of the Corsa, Mokka, Astra and Grandland models, with the first two in both electric and petrol drivetrains.

=== Asia ===
==== China ====
Opel's presence in China recommenced in 2012 with the Antara, and added the Insignia estate in 2013. Opel-derived models are also sold as Buick. On 28 March 2014, Opel announced that it would leave China in 2015.

==== Japan ====
Opel was long General Motors' strongest marque in Japan, with sales peaking at 38,000 in 1996. However, the brand was withdrawn from the Japanese market in December 2006, with just 1,800 sales there in 2005. Since then, Opel has not sold any cars or SUVs in Japan. In December 2019, Groupe PSA announced intentions for Opel to return on the Japanese market in 2022, however the plan was eventually delayed indefinitely after PSA merger into Stellantis due to impact of Covid-19 and chip shortages.

==== Singapore ====
A wide range of Opel models are exported to Singapore.

==== Malaysia ====
Opel was marketed in Malaysia beginning from the 1970s, and early models exported were Kadett, Gemini, and Manta. Opel had moderate sales from the 1980s until the early 2000s, when Malaysian car buyers favoured Japanese and Korean brand cars such as Toyota, Honda, Hyundai (Inokom) and Kia (Naza), which offered more competitive prices. Sales of Opel cars in Malaysia were dropped then, as Opel's prices were slightly higher than the same-segment Japanese, Korean, and local Proton and Perodua cars, and they were hard to maintain, had bad aftersales services, and spare parts were not readily available.

Opel was withdrawn from Malaysian market in 2003, and the last models sold were the Zafira, Astra, and Vectra, and the rebadged Isuzu MU as the Frontera, later replaced by Chevrolet.

==== India ====
Opel India Pvt Ltd (OIPL) was founded in 1996 and gave the average Indian car buyers their first choice of (somewhat) affordable German engineering with the Astra sedan. Opel was withdrawn from the Indian market in 2006, replaced by Chevrolet.

==== Indonesia ====
Since 1938, the country has been producing Opels in a General Motors-owned plant since 1938. The plant was nationalized in 1957. In 1995, General Motors invested a new manufacturing plant in Indonesia, producing the Opel Astra (as Opel Optima), Opel Vectra, and Chevrolet Blazer (as Opel Blazer). The latter was proved a sales success in the country. In 2002, the Opel brand was replaced by the global Chevrolet brand.

==== Thailand ====
Since the 1970s, Opel cars were imported along with Holden cars by Universal Motors Thailand and Asoke Motors. Among the models imported were the Opel Rekord, Holden Torana, and the Opel Olympia. They were replaced by Phranakorn Yontrakarn (PNA) as the exclusive distributor of Opel cars in Thailand in the mid-1980s. PNA imported the Kadett, Astra, Vectra, Omega, and the Calibra to Thailand. The Corsa B was one of the more popular Opel models sold by PNA in the 1990s. In the mid to late 1990s, General Motors Thailand took over from PNA in the overseeing of sales and distribution of Opel cars in the country, with plans to build an assembly plant in Rayong to manufacture the Zafira for the domestic and export markets. However, due to the 1997 Asian financial crisis, the Opel brand was phased out from the Thai market in 2000 and was replaced by Chevrolet. The Zafira A, by then rebadged as a Chevrolet, went on sale in May 2000, to considerable success.

==== Philippines ====
Opel was one of the most popular non-Japanese car brands in the country during the 1970s and the 1980s alongside Ford, but left the Filipino market in 1985 as a result of the economic crisis at that time. GM Philippines returned with the Opel brand in 1997, and started selling the Vectra, Omega and later the Tigra and Astra. Sales were good years after its introduction but Opel still struggled as Japanese manufacturers dominated the local automobile market. GM Philippines withdrew the brand by 2004–2005 due to poor sales. The last cars sold by Opel in the country before leaving the Philippine market were the Astra and the Zafira A (Which was being sold under the Chevrolet brand). The Opel brand was later replaced by Chevrolet's lineup.

==== Taiwan ====
In the 1980s, Kadett E and Omega A were imported to the Taiwanese market, but the dealers imported base models and modified them with unstable quality. The CAC company became Opel's sole import agent in Taiwan, and the models were later manufactured and sold in Taiwan as the Astra F and Vectra B. However, CAC went bankrupt in the late 1990s and stopped manufacturing Opel cars. GM Taiwan and then Yulong GM, a joint venture between Yulong and General Motors, continued to import and sell the Astra G/H, Corsa B/C, Omega B, and Zafira A/B in Taiwan until 2012. In 2022, Master Win Group relaunched Opel in the Taiwanese market.

=== South America ===
Several Opel models were sold across Latin America, mainly Brazil and Argentina, for decades with Chevrolet development badges and its derivatives, including the Corsa, Kadett, Astra, Vectra, Omega, Meriva, and Zafira. In the early 2010s, the Chevrolet line-up changed to adopt North American models such as the Spark, Sonic, and Cruze, or local, own Brazilian development models like the Cobalt, Celta, Onix, Spin, and Agile - of which the Onix, Cobalt, and Spin are still produced. This ended once Opel came under Stellantis ownership.

Opel has exported a wide range of products to Chile since 2011 and Colombia, Ecuador, Uruguay since 2021.

=== Europe ===
==== Ireland ====
In the 1980s, Opel became the sole GM brand name in Ireland, with the Vauxhall brand having been dropped. Vauxhall's Managing Director has also been Opel Ireland's Chief Executive since 2015.

There were two Opel-franchised assembly plants in Ireland in the 1960s. One in Ringsend, Dublin, was operated by Reg Armstrong Motors, which also assembled NSU cars and motorcycles. The second assembly plant was based in Cork and operated by O'Shea's, which also assembled Škoda cars and Zetor tractors. The models assembled were the Kadett and the Rekord. From 1966, the Admiral was imported as a fully built unit and became a popular seller.

== European Car of the Year ==
Opel have produced five winners of the European Car of the Year competition:

- 1985: Opel Kadett E
- 1987: Opel Omega A
- 2009: Opel Insignia
- 2012: Opel Ampera
- 2016: Opel Astra K

=== Shortlisted models ===
Several models have been shortlisted, including the:

- 1980: Opel Kadett D
- 1981: Opel Ascona C
- 1989: Opel Vectra A
- 1991: Opel Calibra
- 1992: Opel Astra F
- 1995: Opel Omega B
- 1999: Opel Astra G
- 2000: Opel Zafira A
- 2007: Opel Corsa D
- 2010: Opel Astra J
- 2011: Opel Meriva B

== Nomenclature ==
From the late 1930s to the 1980s, terms from the German Navy (Kapitän, Admiral, Kadett) and from other official sectors (Diplomat, Senator) were often used as model names. Since the late 1980s, the model names of Opel passenger cars end with an a. As Opels were no longer being sold in Great Britain, the need to have separate model names for essentially identical Vauxhall and Opel cars (although some exceptions were made to suit the British market) was made redundant. The last series to be renamed across the two companies was the Opel Kadett, being the only Opel to take the name of its Vauxhall counterpart, as Opel Astra. Although only two generations of Astra were built prior to the 1991 model, the new car was referred to across Europe as the Astra F, referring to its Kadett lineage. Until 1993, the Opel Corsa was known as the Vauxhall Nova in Great Britain, as Vauxhall had initially felt that Corsa sounded too much like "coarse", and would not catch on.

Exceptions to the nomenclature of ending names with an "a" include the under-licence built Monterey, the Speedster (also known as the Vauxhall VX220 in Great Britain), GT (which was not sold at all as a Vauxhall, despite the VX Lightning concept), the Signum, Karl, and the Adam. The Adam was initially supposed to be called, "Junior" as was its developmental codename and because the name 'Adam' had no history/importance to the Vauxhall marque.

Similar to the passenger cars, the model names of commercial vehicles end with an o (Combo, Vivaro, Movano), except the Corsavan and Astravan.

Another unique aspect to Opel nomenclature is its use of the "Caravan" (originally styled as 'Car-A-Van') name to denote its station wagon body configuration, (similar to Volkswagen's Variant or Audi's Avant designations), a practice the company observed for many decades, which finally ceased with the 2008 Insignia and 2009 Astra, where the name "Sports Tourer" is now used for the estate/station wagon versions.

== Current model range ==
The following tables list current and announced Opel production vehicles as of 2024:

Rocks (A rebadged Citroën Ami) (Production: 2021–present)	Quadricycle
Corsa (Production: 1982–present)	Supermini, hatchback
Astra (Production: 1991–present)	Small family car, hatchback and estate
Mokka (Production: 2012–present)	Subcompact crossover SUV
Frontera (A rebadged Citroën C3 Aircross) (Was previously a rebadged Isuzu MU from 1991 to 2004) (Production: 1991–2004 (original), 2024–present (revival))	Mid-size SUV (original); Subcompact crossover SUV (revival)
Grandland (Production: 2017–present)	Compact crossover SUV
Combo Life (A rebadged Peugeot Rifter/Citroën Berlingo) (Production: 2018–present)	Leisure activity vehicle
Zafira Life (A rebadged Peugeot Traveller/Citroën SpaceTourer) (Production: 1999–present)	Large Minivan (was previously a compact MPV from 1999 to 2019)

=== Light commercial vehicles ===
Combo (A rebadged Peugeot Partner/Citroën Berlingo) (Was previously a panel van version of the Opel Kadett from 1986 to 1993) (Was previously a panel van version of the Opel Corsa from 1993 to 2006) (Was previously a rebadged Fiat Doblò from 2012 to 2018) (Production: 1986–present)	Compact LCV	Van
Vivaro (A rebadged Peugeot Expert/Citroën Jumpy) (Was previously a rebadged Renault Trafic from 2001 to 2019) (Production: 2001–present)	Mid-size LCV	Van; Chassis cab
Movano (A rebadged Fiat Ducato) (Was previously a rebadged Renault Master from 1998 to 2021) (Production: 1998–present)	Full-size LCV	Van; Chassis cab; Crew cab

== Discontinued models ==
=== Introduced before acquisition by General Motors (1866–1935) ===
System Lutzmann	1899–1902
10/12 PS	1902–1906
Darracq	1902–1907
20/22 PS	1903–1906
12/14 PS	1904–1908
14/20 PS	1904–1908
35/40 PS	1905–1909
45/50 PS	1906–1909
18/30 PS	1907–1909
10/18 PS	1907–1910
33/60 PS	1908–1913
Doktorwagen	1909–1910
6/12 PS	1909–1910
6/14 PS	1909–1910
15/24 PS	1909–1911
21/45 PS	1909–1914
8/16 PS	1910–1911
28/70 PS	1910–1914
24/50 PS	1910–1916
8/20 PS	1911–1916
10/24 PS	1911–1916
6/16 PS	1911–1920
Puppchen	1911–1920
18/40 PS	1912–1914
40/100 PS	1912–1916
13/30 PS	1912–1924
34/80 PS	1914–1916
12/34 PS	1916–1919
18/50 PS	1916–1919
9/25 PS	1916–1922
21/55 PS	1919–1924
30/75 PS	1919–1924
8M21	1921–1922
10/30 PS	1922–1924
Laubfrosch	1924–1931
10/40 PS	1925–1929
12/50 PS	1927–1929
15/60 PS	1927–1929
8/40 PS	1927–1930
Regent	1928–1929

=== Introduced after acquisition by General Motors (1929–2017) ===
Blitz (the final generation was a rebadged Bedford CF)		1930–1988
1.8 Liter		1931–1933
P4		1931–1937
1,3 Liter		1934–1935
»6«		1934–1937
Olympia		1935–1940 (Original); 1947–1953 (1st Revival); 1967–1970 (2nd Revival)
Super 6		1937–1938
Admiral		1937–1939 (Original); 1964–1976 (Revival)
Kadett		1937–1940 (Original); 1962–1993 (Revival)
Kapitän		1939–1940 (Original); 1948–1970 (Revival)
Rekord		1953–1986
Diplomat		1964–1977
Commodore		1967–1982
GT (the newer generation was a rebadged Saturn Sky)		1968–1973 (Original); 2007–2009 (Revival)
Ascona		1970–1988
Manta (to be revived as a Crossover SUV in 2026)		1970–1988
K 180 (Latin America only)		1974–1978
Gemini (a rebadged Isuzu Gemini) (Malaysia and Thailand only)		1975–1983
Monza		1978–1986
Senator		1978–1993
Chevette (a rebadged Vauxhall Chevette)		1980–1982
Omega		1986–2003
Vectra		1988–2008
Calibra		1990–1997
Campo (a rebadged Isuzu Faster)		1991–2001
Monterey (a rebadged Isuzu Trooper)		1992–1999
Tigra		1994–2001 (Original); 2004–2009 (Revival)
Calais (a rebadged Holden Calais) (Malaysia and Singapore only)		1995–1997
Blazer (a rebadged Chevrolet Blazer) (Indonesia only)		1995–2002
Sintra (a rebadged Chevrolet Venture)		1996–1999
Arena (a rebadged Renault Trafic)		1997–2000
Agila (a rebadged Suzuki Splash, a rebadged Suzuki Solio from 2000 to 2008)		2000–2014
Speedster		2001–2005
Signum		2003–2008
Meriva		2003–2017
Antara		2006–2015
Insignia	Opel Insignia Grand Sport 1.6 Diesel Business Innovation (B) – Frontansicht, 5. Mai 2017, Düsseldorf	2008–2022
Ampera (a rebadged Chevrolet Volt)		2012–2015
Adam		2013–2019
Cascada		2013–2019
Karl (a rebadged Chevrolet Spark)		2015–2019
Ampera-e (a rebadged Chevrolet Bolt)		2017–2019

=== Introduced after acquisition by PSA Group (2017–present) ===
Crossland	2017–2024

== Motorsports ==
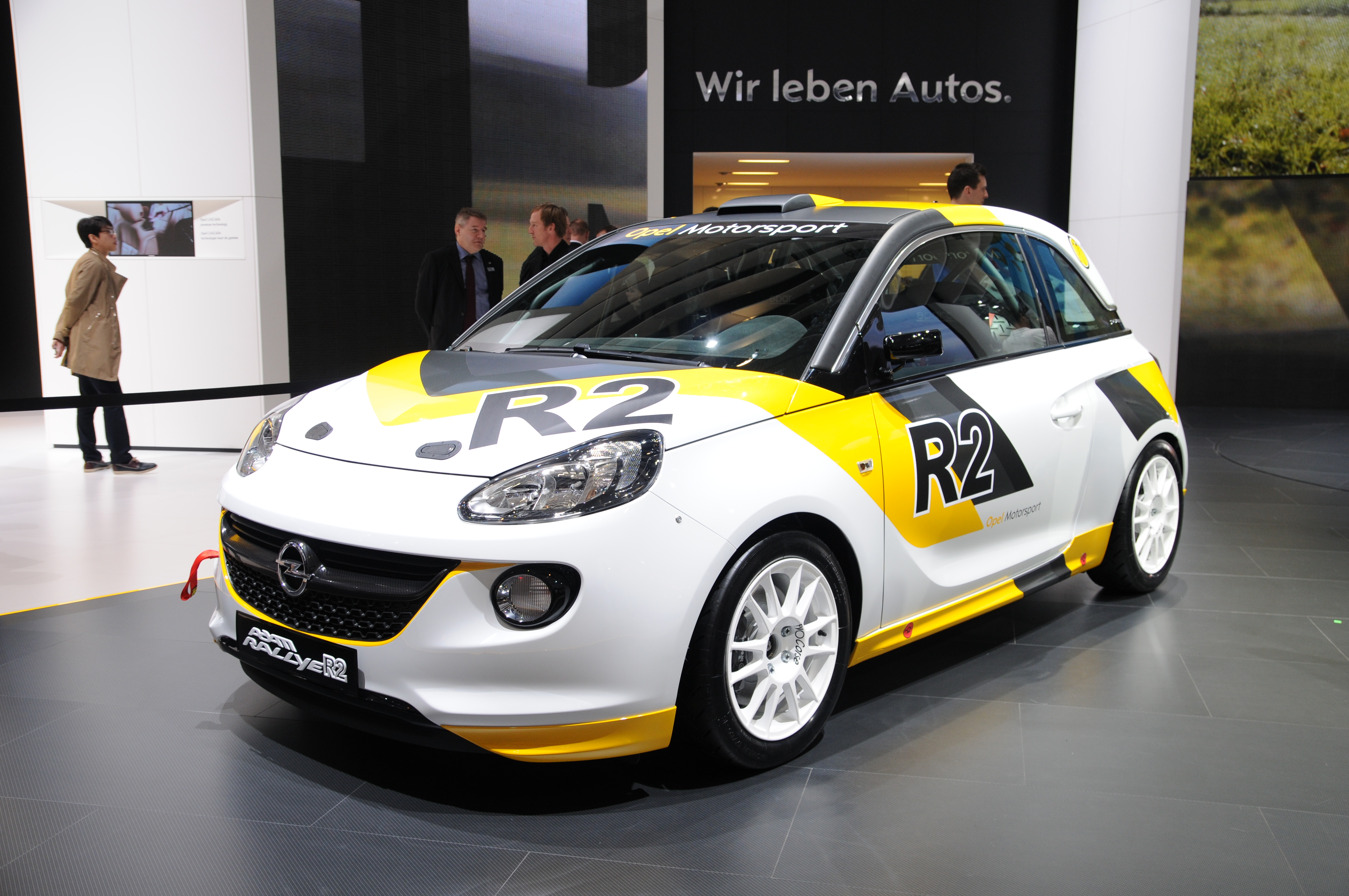
Opel Adam R2 Rallye at the 2013 Geneva Motor Show

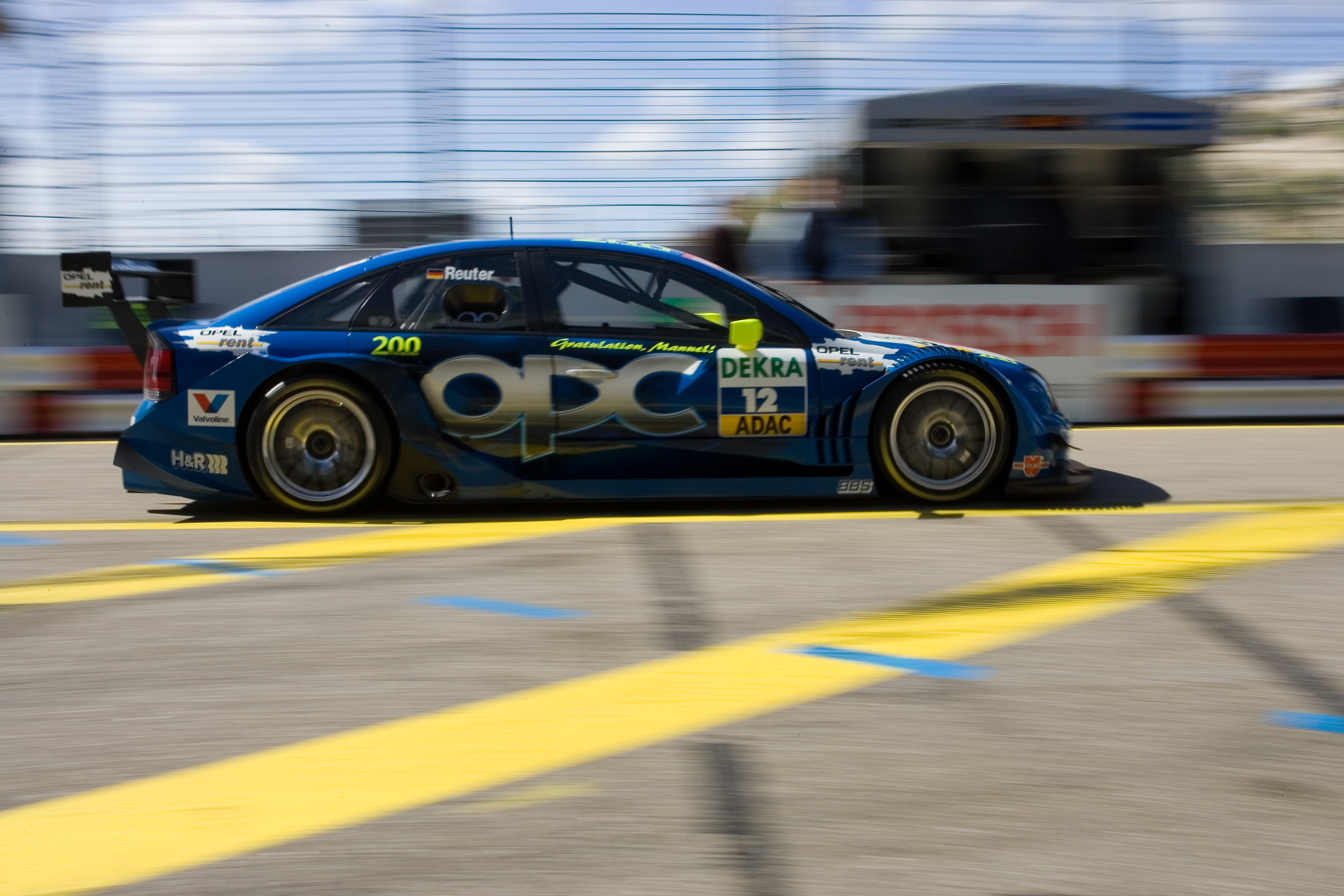
Opel Vectra GTS V8 DTM of Phoenix Racing at Circuit Park Zandvoort in 2005

Opel Rally Team took part in World Rally Championship in the early 1980s with the Opel Ascona 400 and the Opel Manta 400, developed in conjunction with Irmscher and Cosworth. Walter Röhrl won the 1982 World Rally Championship drivers' title, and the 1983 Safari Rally was won by Ari Vatanen.

In the 1990s, Opel took part in the Deutsche Tourenwagen Meisterschaft and the succeeding International Touring Car Championship, and won the 1996 championship with the Calibra. The brand also participated in the Super Tourenwagen Cup in the 1990s, winning the manufacturers' title in 1998. Opel took part in the revived German DTM race series between 2000 and 2005 with the Astra and Vectra models, but after winning several races in 2000, it struggled for results afterwards and never won the championship. However, Opel won the Nürburgring 24 Hours with the Astra in 2003.

Opel returned to motorsport competition with the Adam in 2013.

In 2014, Opel presented a road-legal sport version of the Adam R2 Rally Car – the Opel Adam S – powered by a 1.4 L turbocharged engine which produces 150 hp (112 kW), allowing it to accelerate from 0–100 km/h (62 mph) in 8.5 seconds.

In 2019, at IAA, Opel presented the Corsa Rally Electric, an electric rally car for customer motorsport. Together with ADAC, Europe's largest automobile association, Opel has started the ADAC Opel Electric Rally Cup, the first rally brand cup for electric cars in the world in 2021. The charging infrastructure uses renewably generated electricity from the public power grid. In 2023, teams from seven nations took part in eight races in Germany, Austria, France and Switzerland. The electric motor, battery, inverter, and onboard charger come from the Corsa production vehicle. In 2024, the cup will enter its fourth season.

In March 2026, Opel announced its entry into Formula E with the Opel GSE Formula E Team for Season 13 (2026–27) — the beginning of the Gen4 era.

== Sponsorship ==
Opel had previously sponsored football clubs AC Milan (1994–2006), Bayern Munich (1989–2002), Paris Saint-Germain (1995–2002), Fiorentina (1983–1986), Bordeaux (1985–1991) and Feyenoord (2013–2017).

== See also ==
- Fritz von Opel
- Rikky von Opel
- Wilhelm von Opel
- Irmscher
- Steinmetz Opel Tuning
- IDA-Opel
- List of German cars
