= List of Opel vehicles =

The following is a list of vehicles produced by German automobile manufacturer Opel since 1899. It includes current and past production models.

Since 2021, Opel has been owned by Stellantis and many of its current vehicles have platforms and mechanical components in common with other Stellantis brands. Before that, Opel was owned by Groupe PSA (Peugeot-Citroën), after its sale by General Motors. Opel was part of General Motors from 1929 to 2017.

== Current production vehicles ==
| Model | Calendar year introduced | Current model | | Vehicle description |
| Model | Calendar year introduced | Introduction | Update/facelift | Vehicle description |
|---|---|---|---|---|
Hatchback
| Astra | 1991 | 2021 | 2026 | C-segment/compact hatchback. Also marketed as the Vauxhall Astra in the UK. |
| Corsa | 1982 | 2019 | 2023 | B-segment/subcompact hatchback. Available in an electric version called Corsa-e. Also marketed as the Vauxhall Corsa in the UK. |
Station wagon/estate
| Astra Sports Tourer | 1991 | 2021 | 2026 | Station wagon version of the Astra. |
SUV/crossover
| Frontera | 2024 | 2024 | – | Subcompact crossover SUV. Also marketed as the Vauxhall Frontera in the UK. |
| Grandland | 2017 | 2024 | – | Compact crossover SUV. Also marketed as the Vauxhall Grandland in the UK. |
| Mokka | 2012 | 2020 | 2024 | Subcompact crossover SUV. Also marketed as the Vauxhall Mokka in the UK. |
Minivans/MPVs
| Combo Life | 2018 | 2018 | 2024 | Passenger version of the Combo. Also marketed as the Vauxhall Combo Life in the UK. |
| Zafira Life | 2019 | 2019 | 2024 | Passenger version of the Vivaro. Also marketed as the Vauxhall Vivaro Life in the UK. |
Vans
| Combo | 1986 | 2018 | 2024 | Panel van and leisure activity vehicle that shares its basic platform with the Peugeot Partner. Also marketed as the Vauxhall Combo in the UK. |
| Movano | 1998 | 2021 | 2024 | Light commercial vehicle and large van, previously rebadged Renault Master and currently rebadged Fiat Ducato. Also marketed as the Vauxhall Movano in the UK. |
| Vivaro | 2001 | 2019 | 2024 | Light commercial van, previously rebadged Renault Trafic and currently rebadged Citroën Jumpy. Also marketed as the Vauxhall Vivaro in the UK. |
Quadricycle
| Rocks electric | 2022 | 2022 | 2025 | Quadricycle. Rebadged Citroën Ami, formerly Rock-e until 2023. |

== Former production vehicles ==
- 1899–1902 Opel Patent Motor Car, System Lutzmann
- 1909–1910 Opel 4/8 PS "Doktorwagen"
- 1911–1920 Opel 5/12 PS "Puppchen"
- 1922–1924 Opel 10/30 (10/35) PS
- 1924–1931 Opel 4 PS "Laubfrosch
- 1928–1929 Opel Regent
- 1928 Opel RAK
- 1928 Opel RAK2
- 1930–1975 Opel Blitz
- 1935–1940, 1947–1953, 1967–1970 Opel Olympia
- 1935–1937 Opel P4
- 1937–1940, 1962–1991 Opel Kadett
- 1937–1939, 1964–1977 Opel Admiral
- 1937–1938 Opel Super 6
- 1939–1970 Opel Kapitän
- 1953–1957 Opel Olympia Rekord
- 1964–1977 Opel Diplomat
- 1967–1982 Opel Commodore
- 1968–1973, 2006–2009 Opel GT
- 1970–1988 Opel Ascona
- 1970–1988 Opel Manta
- 1973–1986 Opel Bedford Blitz
- 1978–1986 Opel Monza
- 1978–1993 Opel Senator
- 1980–2018 Opel Vivaro
- 1980–1982 Opel Chevette
- 1983–2018 Opel Corsavan
- 1986–2003 Opel Omega
- 1988–2008 Opel Vectra
- 1989–1997 Opel Calibra
- 1991–2004 Opel Frontera
- 1992–2001 Opel Campo
- 1992–1999 Opel Monterey
- 1994–2000, 2004–2009 Opel Tigra
- 1996–1999 Opel Sintra
- 1997–2001 Opel Arena
- 1998–2013 Opel Astravan
- 1999–2019 Opel Zafira Tourer
- 2000–2015 Opel Agila
- 2000–2005 Opel Speedster
- 2003–2017 Opel Meriva
- 2003–2008 Opel Signum
- 2006–2015 Opel Antara
- 2008–2022 Opel Insignia
- 2011–2015 Opel Ampera
- 2012–2019 Opel Adam
- 2012–2019 Opel Vivaro Tour
- 2014–2019 Opel Karl
- 2017–2019 Opel Ampera-e
- 2017–2024 Opel Crossland

== See also ==
- List of automobiles
- List of concept cars from Opel
