= Vivaro (disambiguation) =

Vivaro is a comune in the province of Pordenone, northern Italy.

Vivaro may also refer to:

- Opel Vivaro (disambiguation) and Vauxhall Vivaro, a series of light commercial vehicles
- VBET, an Armenian gambling company formerly known as Vivaro Bet

== See also ==
- Vivaro Romano, a commune near Rome, in Italy
- Vivaro-Alpine dialect, spoken in southeastern France and northwestern Italy
