= Opel 2.0 litre =

Opel 2 Liter
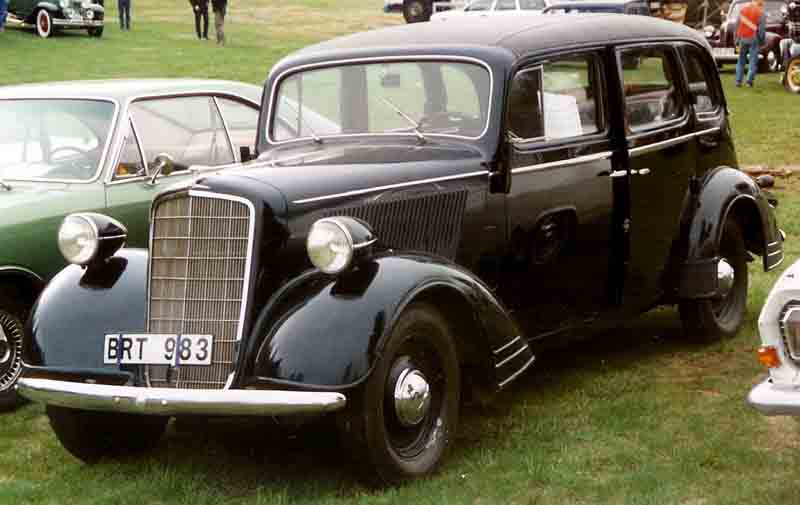
- 1936 Opel Regent Pullman-limousine

Overview
- Manufacturer: Opel
- Also called: Opel »6«
- Production: 1934–1937
- Assembly: Germany: Rüsselsheim

Body and chassis
- Class: executive car
- Body style: 2/4-door limousine (saloon); 2-door cabriolet with two or four side windows; 2-door cabrio-limousine; 4-door, 6-seater limousine (LWB); 4-door, 6-seater Pullman-limousine (LWB); 4-door cabrio-limousine (LWB); 4-door landaulet (LWB); 4-door Droschken-landaulet (LWB, taxi version); bare chassis for specialist bodies
- Layout: FR layout

Powertrain
- Engine: 1932 cc side-valve I6
- Transmission: 4-speed manual, no synchromesh

Dimensions
- Wheelbase: 2,642 mm (104.0 in) or 3,050 mm (120 in)
- Length: 4,390 mm (173 in) or 4,800 mm (190 in)
- Width: 1,565 mm (61.6 in)
- Height: 1,600 mm (63 in)

Chronology
- Predecessor: Opel 1.8 litre
- Successor: Opel Super Six

The Opel 2 Liter, also known as the Opel »6«, is an executive car that was manufactured by Opel. Produced from January 1934, the 2 Liter replaced the Opel 1.8 litre which had ceased production in November 1933. Production continued till June 1937, but the replacement model, the Opel Super 6, was already in production in November 1936, after which production volumes for the 2 Liter were very much diminished.

The Opel 2 Liter was noteworthy for the appearance in August 1934 of a long wheelbase version, available with several different six seater bodies. This was a rapid response to the appearance the previous year of a longer version of the Mercedes-Benz Typ 200 which had managed in a very short time to capture practically the entire German taxi business.

Like other Opels of the period the 2 Liter was designed and developed for Opel by the manufacturer's parent company, General Motors, in North America.

== New chassis ==
The 2 Liter, like the smaller 1,3 Liter which appeared at the same time, came with a newly developed "Torsion resistant" box frame chassis with lateral reinforcement. The brakes were now controlled using a hydraulic mechanism. The suspension involved the new synchronous springing, a suspension based on the Dubonnet system for which General Motors in France had recently acquired the license. The General Motors version, which had been further developed by Opel's North American parent, provided a soft ride, but the suspension generated criticism of its impact on handing and control, especially in the early applications of the system such as that on the Opel 2 Liter.

Transmission of power to the rear wheels was achieved using a four-speed manual gear-box. There was no synchromesh. The car was fitted with conventional steel disc wheels, with perforated wheel discs (featuring a ring of holes between the hub and the tyre) replacing the plain discs in 1937.

The standard wheelbase was 2,642 mm (104.0 in). A lengthened version of the Opel 2 Liter, with a 3,050 mm (120 in) wheelbase, appeared in August 1934, targeted unapologetically at taxi operators. It was no coincidence that a rival model was the longer wheelbase version of the Mercedes-Benz Typ 200 which since its appearance in 1933 had achieved impressive sales volumes in Germany primarily because of its popularity with taxi operators.

== Engine ==
The 1932 side valve six cylinder engine was a bored out version of the unit used on the car's predecessor with which it shared its 90 mm stroke. The bore had been increased by 2.5 mm to 67.5 mm. A maximum output of 36 PS (26 kW; 36 hp) at 3,300 rpm was claimed. Listed top speed was 100 km/h (62 mph).

== New bodies ==
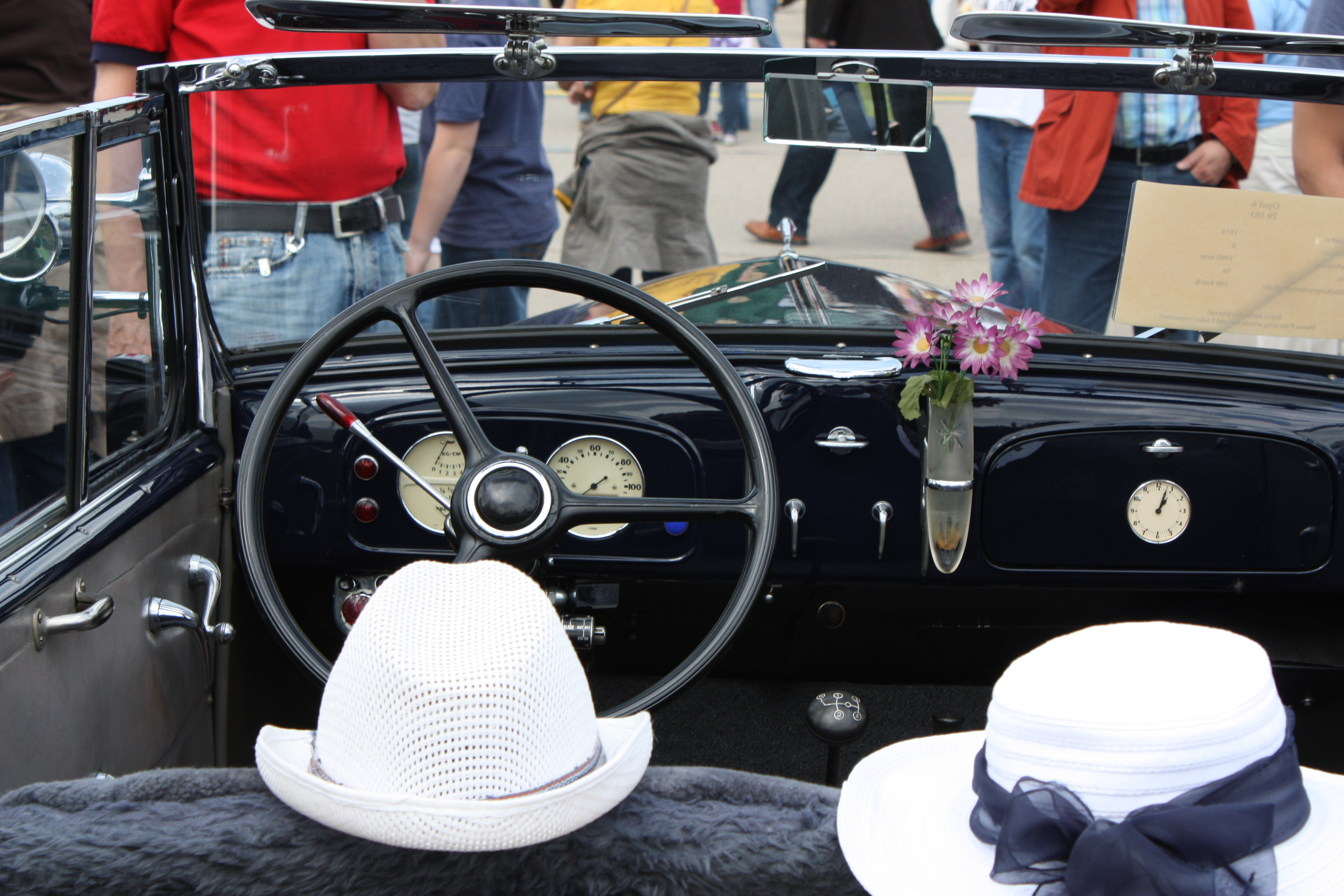
Opel 2 Liter cabriolet interior

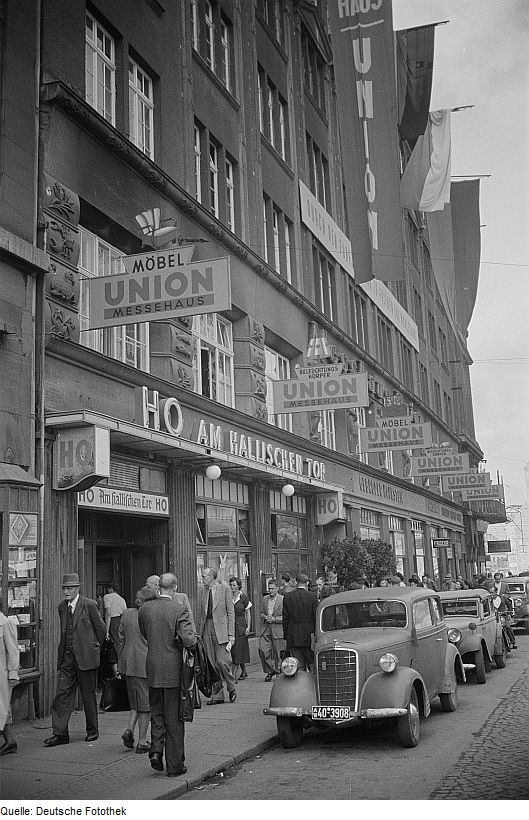
An Opel 2 Liter which survived the war, photographed near the 1951 Leipzig Trade Fair.

The 2 Liter followed the trend of the time with a range of bodies that were fashionably streamlined. The standard bodies all came with a sloping tail that incorporated a boot which could be accessed from outside the car using a lid provided for the purpose.

When the car first appeared in January 1934 there the choice was between a four-door Iimousine (saloon) and a two-door, four-seater cabriolet with two side windows. These were priced aggressively at 3,600 Marks and 4,000 Marks respectively.

Later that year, in August 1934, the long wheel base version was launched with a range of bodies that included a six-seater Limousine (saloon), a six-seater (soft top) Cabrio-Limousine, a 6-seater Pullman-Limousne (with a more vertical back-end), a Torpedo-bodied Laundaulet and a Droschken-Landaulet. Although only the last of these spelled out the target market (Droschke meaning livery car, or taxi) in its name, all the various long wheel base Opel 2 Liters were designed with the taxi trade in mind. The least expensive of them, the four-door, six-seater long wheelbase Limousine came with a manufacturer's listed price of 4,800 Marks throughout the model's production period. A buyer determined to buy even the least costly Limousine-bodied Mercedes-Benz Typ 200s with a long wheelbase would have needed, in 1934, to find 5,700 Marks.

The range of available standard bodies expanded further in 1935 with the appearance of two-door, four-seater Limousine and Cabrio-limousine models and of an additional cabriolet body, now with four side windows and a correspondingly more upright appearance than the two side-window cabriolet already offered since January 1934. 1936 saw the withdrawal of several open topped versions of the long wheel base car, and by 1937 only the standard (shorter wheelbase) length models, listed at prices 150 Marks lower than those applied between 1934 and 1936, remained on offer. 1937 saw the return to the German economy of some price deflation so it would be simplistic to assume that the small price cuts in 1937 resulted from a collapse in demand, although sales statistics do suggest that by 1937 both the manufacturer and its customers were focused on the new Opel Super 6 (and in a different class, the hugely significant Opel Kadett).

== Commercial ==
Opel had produced 52,594 2-litre models by the time production ended in June 1937. Its best year was 1936 when 19,275 were produced. 1937 followed several years of sustained growth in the German auto-market which that year stood at 213,117, but most of the market growth had been in the small car categories. The Opel 2 Liter was the country's top selling middle class car of the 1930s.

== Sources and further reading ==
This entry includes information from the equivalent section in the German Wikipedia.

- Oswald, Werner (2001). Deutsche Autos 1920-1945, Band (vol) 2 (in German). Motorbuch Verlag. ISBN 3-613-02170-6.
