= Opel 1.8 Liter =

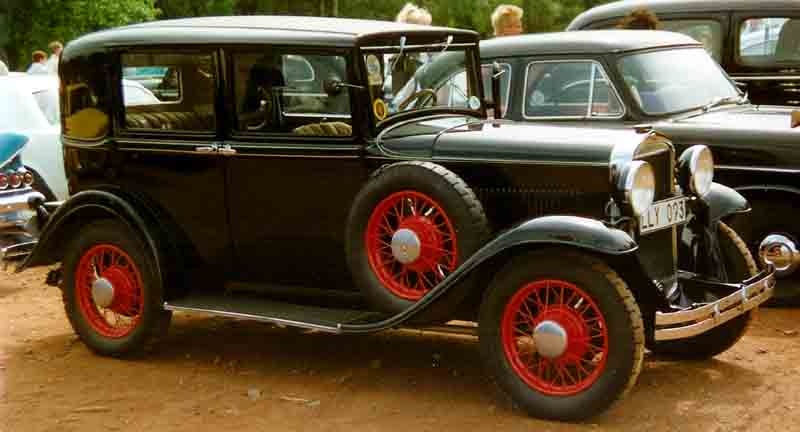
- 1931 Opel 1.8 Liter 4-door sedan (Model 18B)

Overview
- Manufacturer: Opel
- Production: 1931–1933
- Assembly: Germany: Rüsselsheim

Body and chassis
- Class: family car
- Body style: 4-door saloon/sedan 2-door Cabriolet with four seats but two side windows ”Touring” (Torpedo bodied 2- door 4-seater) ”Sonnen-” Limousine & coupe bodied incorporating steel sun-roof also offered in “bare chassis” form
- Layout: FR layout

Powertrain
- Engine: 1790 cc side-valve 6-cylinder
- Transmission: till 1933: 3-speed manual No synchromesh from 1933: 4-speed manual No synchromesh

Dimensions
- Wheelbase: 2,540 mm (100 in)2,642 mm (104.0 in)
- Length: 3,800 mm (150 in) - 3,960 mm (156 in)
- Width: 1,480 mm (58 in) - 1,490 mm (59 in)
- Height: 1,490 mm (59 in) - 1,670 mm (66 in)

Chronology
- Predecessor: Opel 8/40 PS
- Successor: Opel »6«

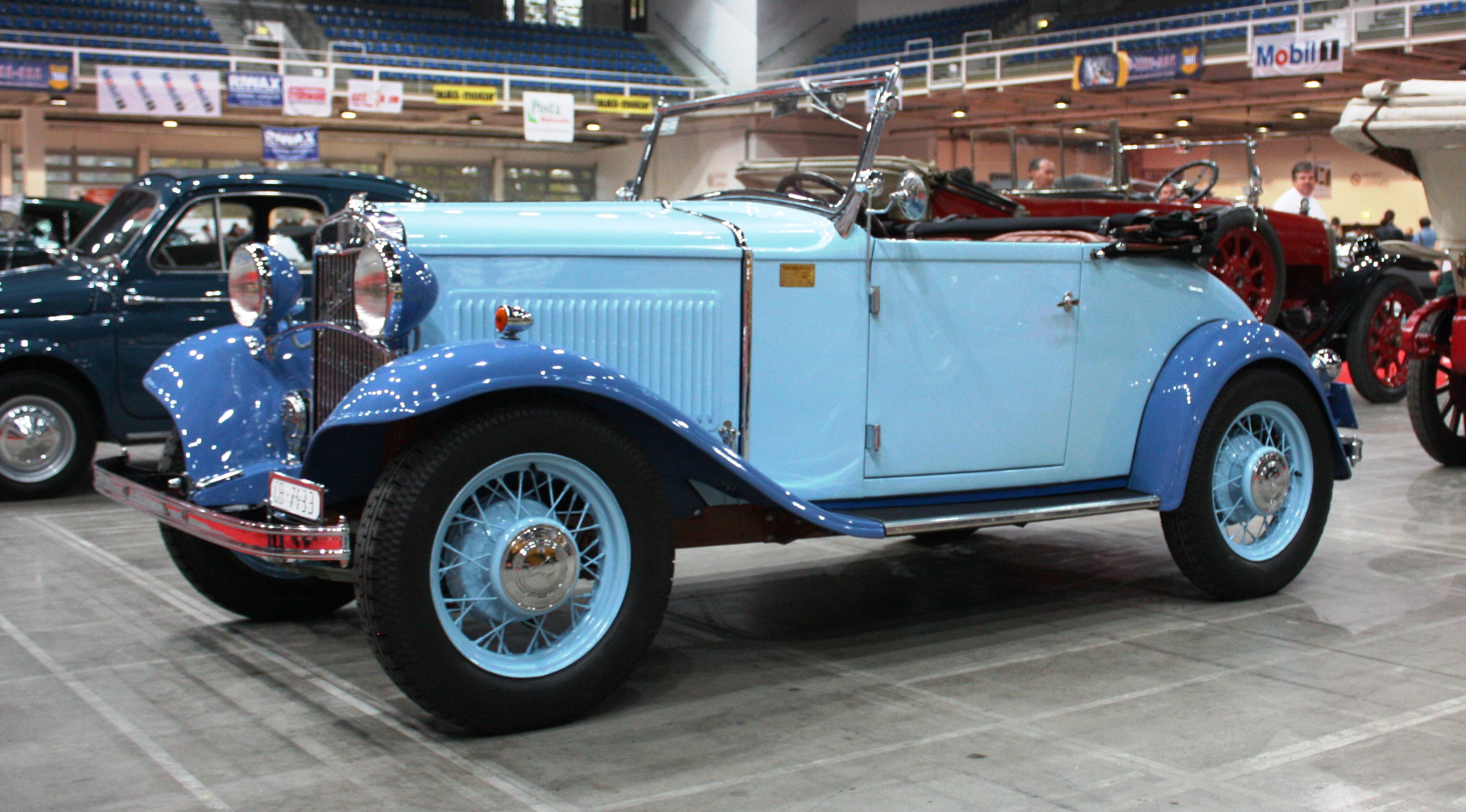
Opel 1.8 Liter series 1833 cabriolet 2 seater

The Opel 1.8 Liter is a family car manufactured by Opel. Production commenced in January 1931, and continued till November 1933. The Opel 1.8 Liter was the first new Opel to be launched following the purchase of an 80% share in Opel by General Motors (GM), and the first Opel to have been designed and developed by GM in North America.

== Engine ==
The car came with a 1790 cc six cylinder side-valve engine fed by a Solex 30FV carburettor. A maximum output of 32 PS (24 kW; 32 hp) at 3,200 rpm was claimed. Advertised top speed was 85 km/h (53 mph). Power was transmitted to the rear wheels using a three speed gearbox controlled with a transmission stick beside the driver, in the middle of the floor.

1933 saw a small increase in both the compression ratio and the claimed power output. The transmission was replaced with a four speed unit, but still without synchromesh. This was now the transmission that would be fitted in the Opel »6« 2-litre when it appeared the next year. The claimed top speed now increased to 90 km/h (56 mph).

== Bodies ==
When production started in January 1931 with the so-called Opel 1.8 Liter Series 18B, there were essentially three different body options. The entry-level model was a two-seater cabriolet with fixed side windows and a fold-out Dickey-seat at the back, aggressively priced at 3,175 Marks. There was a four-door Limousine (sedan/saloon), and there was also a two-door "Sonnen-Coupé". The Sonnen-Coupé had a black imitation leather roof covering, which the casual observer might mistake for a folding roof, and which curiously adumbrated the vinyl roof coverings which became fashionable among several mainstream auto-makers and their customers in Europe in the 1970s. The Sonnen-Coupé was in fact a style already familiar in France where cars with this type of body were called Faux-Cabriolets ("False cabriolets"). An added twist with the Opel 1.8 Liter Sonnen-Coupé was an opening steel panel sun roof, denoted by the reference in the car’s name to the sun.

Other body types that soon became available were a Torpedo style two door "Touring" body, a "Roadster" and a two-door "Limousine" (sedan/saloon).

== Evolution ==
During its first year the 1.8 Liter Series 18B enjoyed fantastic success in the market place, with 15,739 cars produced in a single year. In 1931 and 1932 the German automobile market was badly depressed as the economy suffered from the aftershocks of the 1929 stock market crashes. Opel was already Germany’s leading auto producer, but the number of customers that the 1.8 Liter found is particularly impressive given the total German passenger car sales figure of just 56,039 in 1931.

Towards the end of 1931 Opel introduced the 1.8 litre Series 18C, for the 1932 model year. This was little changed from the Series 18B, though the range of bodies was further broadened. On the outside the two piece bumper was replaced by a simpler single piece bumper, although cars lower down the range still came without any bumper. The manufacturer's prices for the Series 18C cars were for most bodied versions several a few hundred marks lower than for their 1931 equivalents, reflecting several years of price deflation in the German economy during the early 1930s.

July 1932 saw the introduction of a new Regent all-steel bodied "Limousine." The Regent-bodied cars had nothing in common with the ill fated Opel Regent of 1929 apart from the name. In place of the conventional vertical rear end of the earlier 1.8 Liter, the Regent body came with a sloping rear that followed the fashion for streamlining and incorporated a luggage locker. A spare wheel was mounted on the rear panel and access to the fuel filler was through a fuel cap positioned through the hole in the middle of the spare wheel. The first Regent-bodied 1.8 Liter was a two-door saloon, but over the next few months fashionable new Regent-body equivalents were offered of the more conservative original-bodied versions. The only exception was the torpedo-bodied Touring version which retained the more perpendicular profile of the original Opel 1.8 Liters. In addition to the Regent bodies, 1933 also saw the introduction of a four-door Series 18N six-light limousine.

== Commercial ==
Between January 1931 and November 1933 Opel produced 32,285 1.8 Liter models. The Opel 1.8 Liter was the number one seller of Germany’s largest auto producer in 1931. By 1932 it had lost the position to the manufacturer’s smaller recently introduced 1.2 Liter. In 1933 the German auto-market started a sustained rebound, with 82,048 cars sold, nearly twice the level of the previous year, but most of the market growth was achieved by newly available smaller less expensive cars such as Opel’s 1.2 Liter and the DKW F2. With 9,406 cars manufactured in 1933, its third and final production year, the Opel 1.8 Liter achieved impressive volumes for a six-cylinder car.

== Sources and further reading ==
This entry includes information from the equivalent section in the German Wikipedia.

- Oswald, Werner (2001). Deutsche Autos 1920-1945, Band (vol) 2 (in German). Motorbuch Verlag. ISBN 3-613-02170-6.
