= Opel 8/40 PS =

Opel 7/34 PS (1927–1928) Opel 8/40 PS (1928–1930)
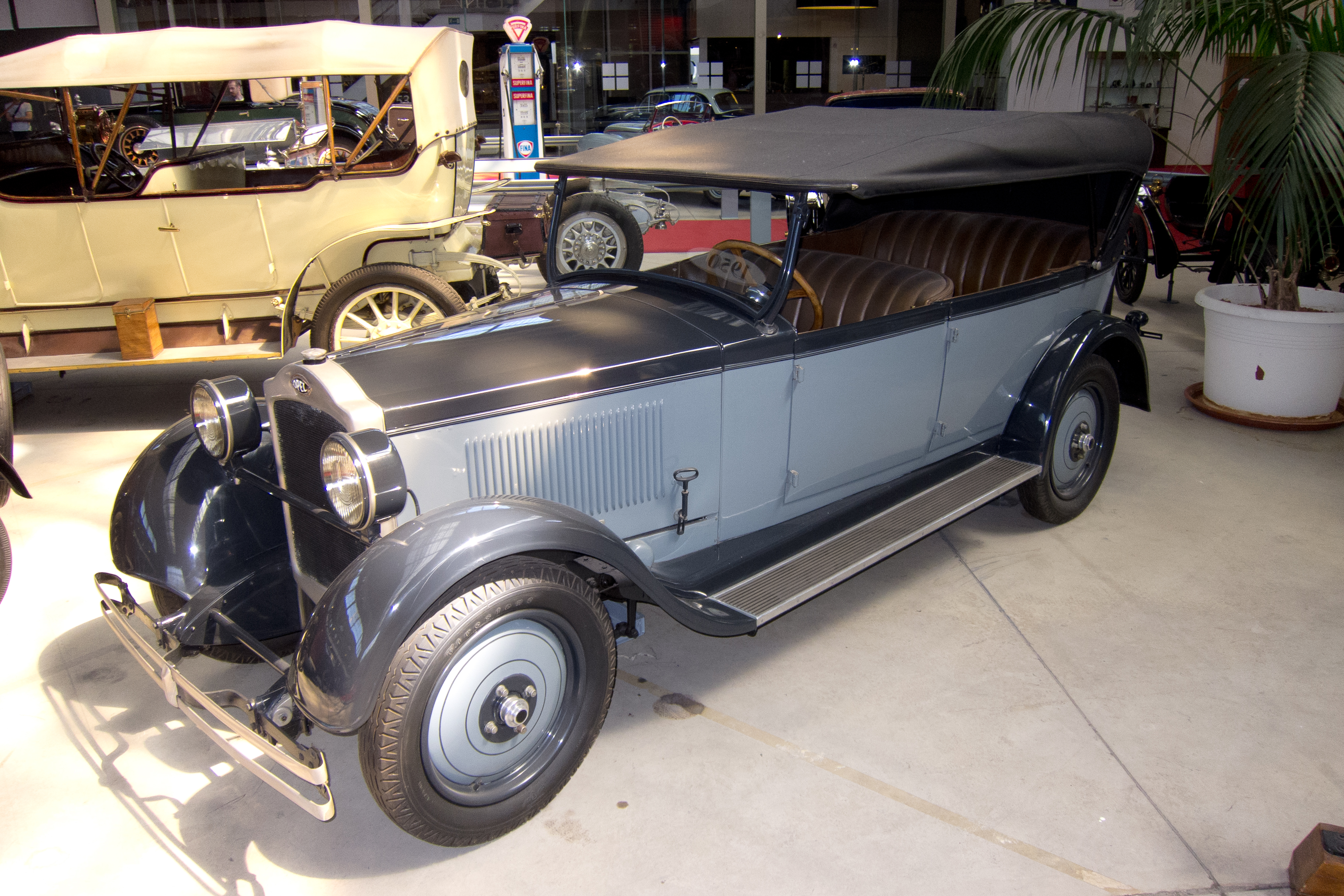
- Opel 8/40 (1928) at Autoworld Brussels, Belgium, 2011

Overview
- Manufacturer: Opel
- Production: 1927–1930
- Assembly: Germany: Rüsselsheim

Body and chassis
- Body style: Torpedo-bodied 4-door "Tourenwagen"; 4-door 4/5-seat "Limousine" (saloon); 4-door "Luxus-Limousine" (saloon); 2- seat Roadster; 2- seat coupé; 2- seat cabriolet
- Layout: FR layout

Powertrain
- Engine: 1735 cc s/v I6 (7/34 PS); 1924 cc s/v I6 (8/40 PS)
- Transmission: 3-speed manual

Dimensions
- Wheelbase: 2,880 mm (113 in)
- Length: 1927–1928: 4,250 mm (167 in); 1928–1929: 4,350 mm (171 in); 1929–1930: 4,500 mm (180 in)
- Width: 1927–1929: 1,520 mm (60 in); 1929–1930: 1,550 mm (61 in)
- Height: 1927–1929: 1,860 mm (73 in); 1929–1930: 1,740 mm (69 in)

Chronology
- Successor: Opel 1.8 Liter

The Opel 7/34 PS is a large but relatively inexpensive six-cylinder-powered car manufactured by Opel, introduced in October 1927. It was replaced in 1928 by the Opel 8/40 PS which was virtually identical except that the cylinder capacity had been increased. Significant changes to the chassis took place in February 1929, after which production of the model continued till September 1930. The 8/40 PS was replaced by the Opel 1.8 Liter in 1931, also a compact six-cylinder car.

== Naming convention ==
The name of the car described the engine and followed the widely followed German convention of the time whereby the first number – here "7" or "8" – identified the car’s tax horsepower (Steuer-PS) (effectively, in the case of German cars of the period, a linear function of the engine capacity) and the second represented the manufacturer’s figure for the actual horsepower.

== Engine, transmission and brakes ==
The engine at launch was a 6-cylinder side-valve 1,735 cc unit for which the manufacturer quoted a maximum output of 34 PS (25 kW; 34 hp) at 3,600 rpm. This engine has a 62 mm × 95 mm (2.44 in × 3.74 in) bore and stroke and was derived from the little four-cylinder used in the Opel Laubfrosch. This supported a claimed top speed of 90 km/h (56 mph). A year later the engine size was increased to 1,924 cc and claimed maximum output increased to 40 PS (29 kW; 39 hp), still at 3,600 rpm. The bore and stroke were both increased, to 64 mm × 100 mm (2.52 in × 3.94 in). Despite the listed weights of 720 kg in bare chassis form and 1170 kg with a standard “Limousine” (sedan/saloon) body being unchanged, along with the gear ratios, the increase in claimed power was not accompanied by any change in the claimed top speed, which remained at 90 km/h (56 mph).

The three-speed manual transmission, controlled using a lever in the middle of the floor, conveyed power to the rear wheels. The footbrake operated on all four wheels via a cable linkage while the handbrake connected directly to the drive shaft.

== The virtue of simplicity ==
The engineering approach taken by Opel was consciously unadventurous. The least expensive version between 1927 and 1929, the Torpedo bodied “Tourenwagen” was priced at 4,600 Mark throughout these years, which was inexpensive enough to make it the cheapest six-cylinder-engined car available in Germany. The unadventurous design is also reflected in that it can be very hard to distinguish an 8/40 PS from one of Opel's "senior" sixes (12/50, 15/60); unless one can compare the wheelbases the easiest way to tell them apart is that the light six uses four rather than five wheel nuts.

Opel’s ability to undercut the competition on price stemmed both from the simplicity of the design and from the fact that Opel was the first, and at this time still the only manufacturer in Germany using a Ford-inspired production line system. Under the circumstances it is not hard to see why Opel was an appealing target when General Motors (GM) were contemplating the acquisition of a major German auto-maker. In March 1929 GM purchased a controlling 80% share in the Opel business.

== The bodies ==
In addition to the Torpedo bodied "Tourenwagen" the Opel 7/34 PS was available at launch as a closed 4-door "Limousine" (sedan/saloon) with a listed price of 4,900 Mark or, for a further 500 Mark, as a 4-door "Luxus-Limousine." They all sat on the same 4,250 mm (167 in) chassis with a 2,880 mm (113 in) wheelbase.

The replacement of the original car with the more powerful Opel 8/40 PS was accompanied by a broadening of the range which now also included a two-seater "Roadster," a two-seater Coupé and a two-seater Cabriolet. The three four-door bodies were offered as before, still using the same 2,880 mm (113 in) wheelbase, but for the new two-seater models Opel used a shorter chassis with a 2,750 mm (108 in) wheelbase.

In addition to the standard bodies, some special coachbuilt bodied cars were also produced, notably by Karosseriewerke Otto Kühn of Halle who specialised in producing bodies for Opel, concentrating on styles for which demand was insufficient to justify Opel tooling-up to build the bodies themselves. Kühn also manufactured an 8/40-engined car of their own design, using their own chassis as well as bodywork, until 1929. This car was marketed as the "Kühn 8/40 PS."

== Switch to an underslung chassis ==
The "Limousine"-bodied cars underwent a significant upgrade, with slightly longer bodies (despite the wheelbase being unchanged) early in 1929. The principal change was the switch from a traditional Hochbett ("Overslung") chassis to a Tiefbett ("Underslung") chassis. (Note: An overslung chassis sits directly above the car's axles, the axle ends and wheels being fixed directly below the chassis frame. An underslung chassis hangs directly below the axles, resulting in a lowered centre of gravity and a lower look for the car.) Opel’s principal competitor for this model was probably the Adler Standard 6 which underwent the same change only in 1933.

== Commercial ==
The 7/34 PS and 8/40 PS between them notched up 20,580 units produced during a production run of approximately three years. It took Adler a little more than seven years to produce 21,249 comparably sized Standard 6s. No other German auto-maker of cars this size (or any size) approached Opels' production volumes in the 1920s.

Year	1927	1928	1929	1930	Units
7/34	?	?	0	0	≤ 8687
8/40	0	?	7543	4350	≥ 11893
total	?	?	7543	4350	20580
