= Opel Super 6 =

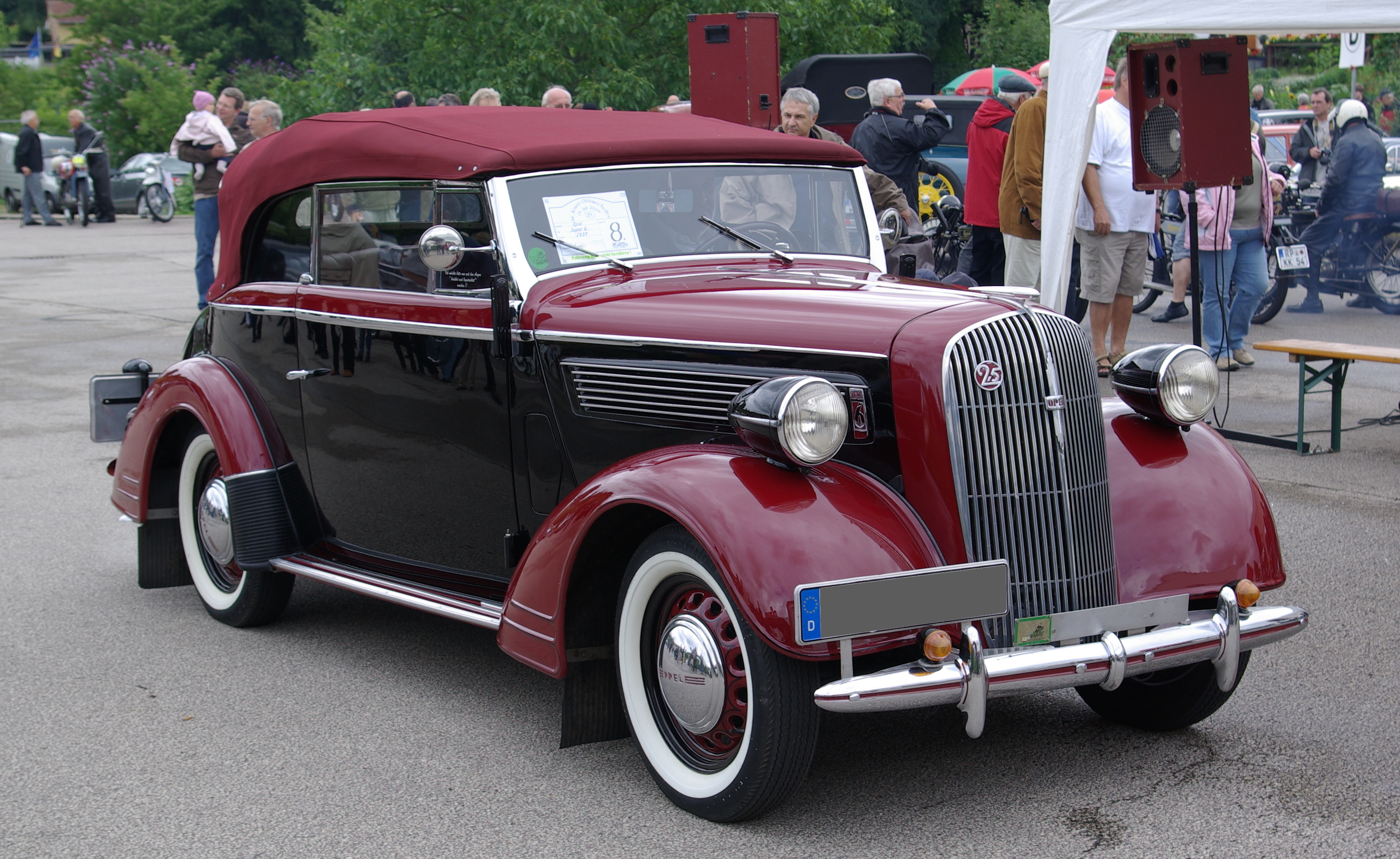

Overview
- Manufacturer: Opel
- Production: 1937–1938
- Assembly: Germany: Rüsselsheim

Body and chassis
- Class: executive car
- Body style: 4-door saloon 2-door cabriolet 2-door coupé
- Layout: FR layout

Powertrain
- Engine: 2.5 L OHV I6

Dimensions
- Length: 4,370 mm (172.0 in)
- Width: 1,565 mm (61.6 in)
- Height: 1,600 mm (63.0 in)
- Kerb weight: 1,145 kg (2,524 lb)

Chronology
- Predecessor: Opel »6«
- Successor: Opel Kapitän

The Opel Super 6 is an executive car which was built by the German car manufacturer Opel between 1937 and late 1938. The car was equipped with a 2.5-litre straight-six engine and had a top speed of 115 km/h (71 mph). It was available in three different versions: a 4-door sedan, a 2-door coupé, and a 2-door cabriolet. A small number of custom-bodied cars were also made by various coachbuilders such as Karosseriewerke Otto Kühn and Gläser.

The 2,473 cc (150.9 cu in) produces 55 PS (40 kW) at 3500 rpm. In total, 46,453 Opel Super Six were built in the two years it was available. ·

An interesting detail was the windscreen wiper drive which received its power via a mechanical linkage from the camshaft, a solution which Opel continued to use in post-World War II Rekord models until 1957.

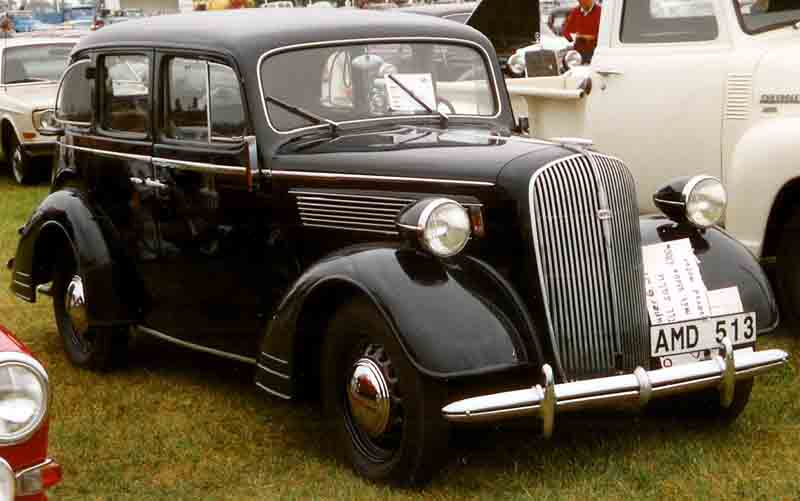
Opel Super 6 4-Door Limousine 1937

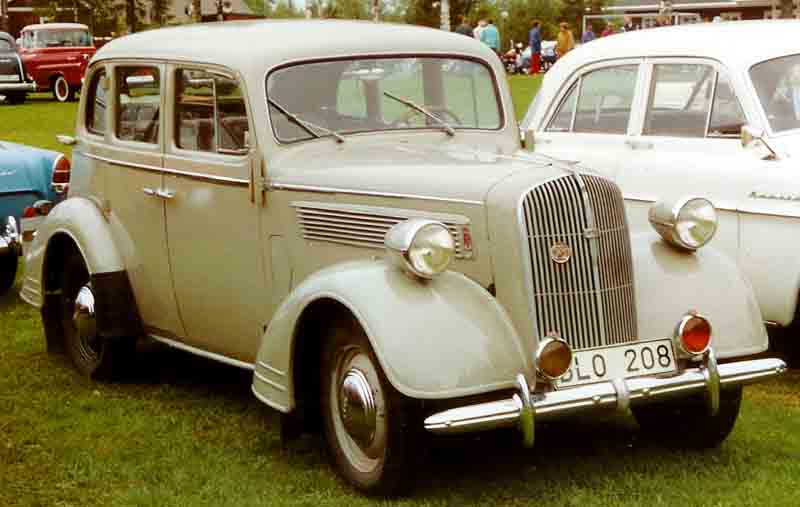
Opel Super 6 De Luxe 4-Door Limousine 1938

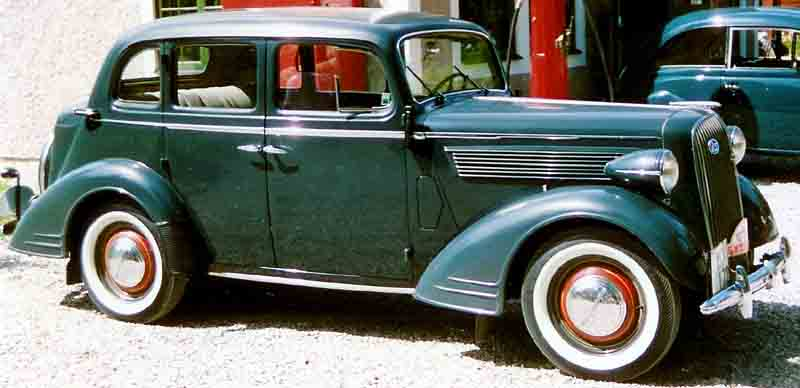
Opel Super 6 De Luxe 4-Door Limousine 1938

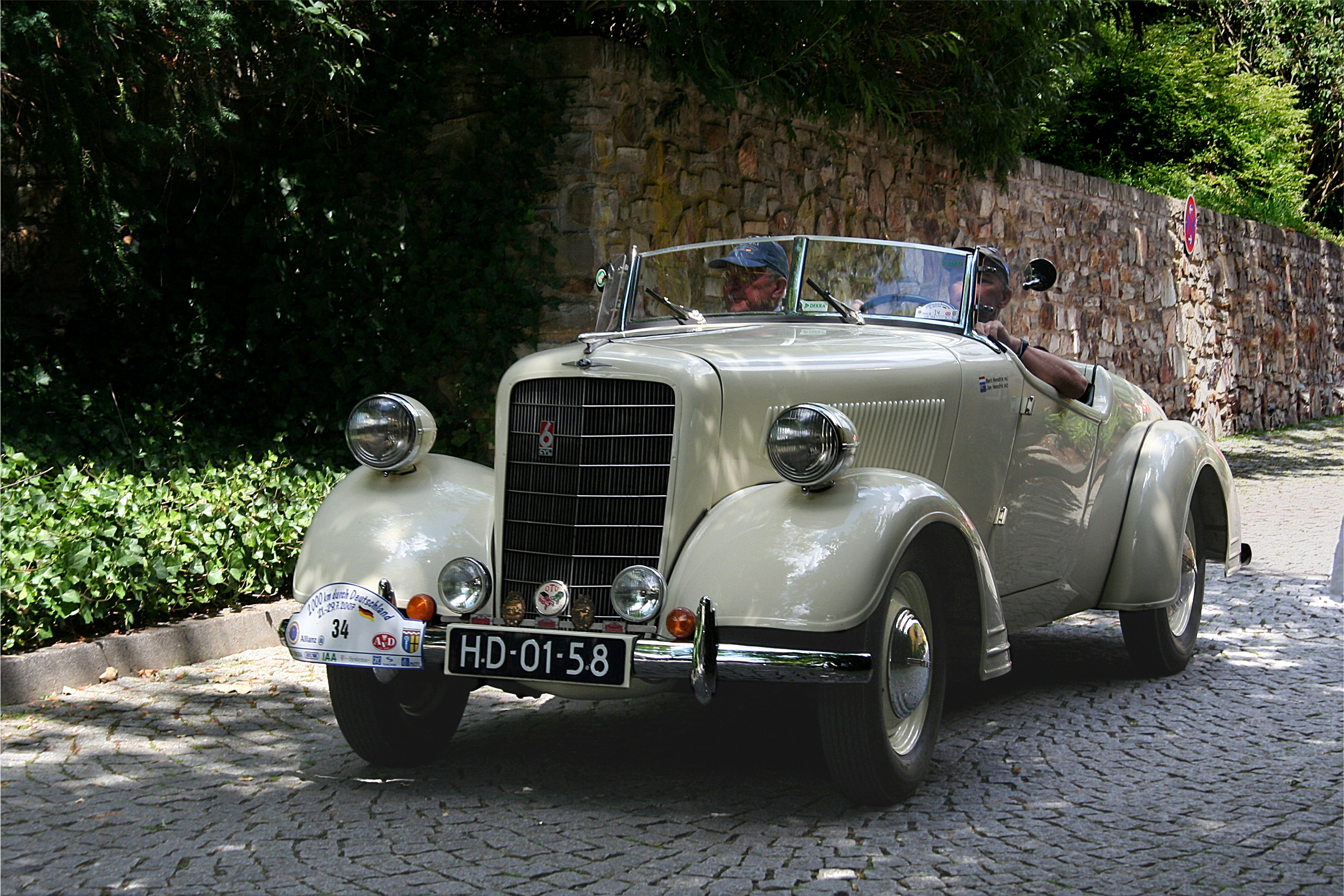
Roadster made by Kühn 1937
