= Opel 4/8 PS =

Opel 4/8 PS Opel Doktorwagen
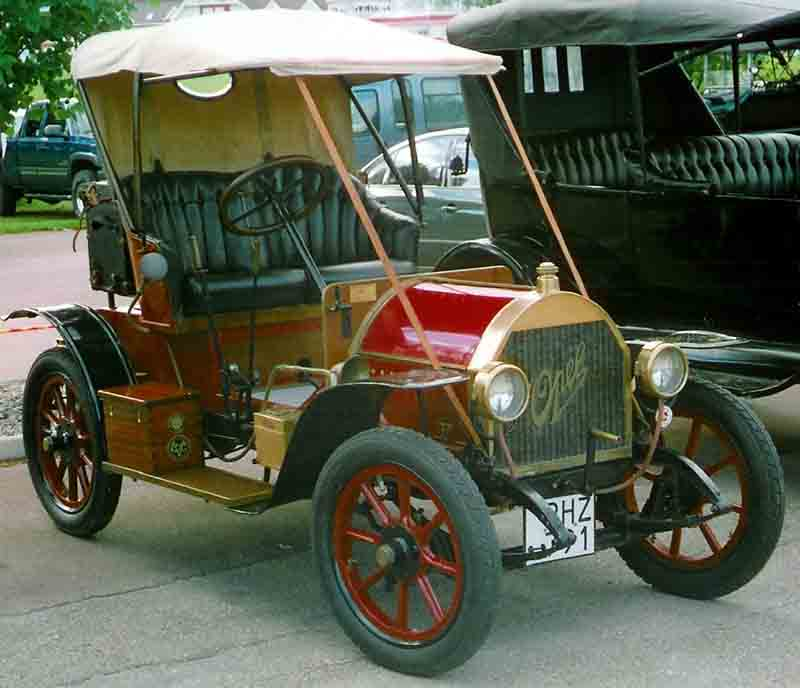

Overview
- Manufacturer: Opel
- Production: 1909–1910

Body and chassis
- Body style: Cabriolet

Powertrain
- Engine: Gasoline engine s: 1029 cc (8 hp)

Dimensions
- Length: 3,500 mm (137.8 in)
- Curb weight: 525 kg (1,157 lb)

Chronology
- Successor: Opel 5/10 PS

The Opel 4/8 PS, also known as the doctor's car (Doktorwagen in German), is an automobile from the German automaker Opel.

== Vehicle ==
The Opel 4/8 PS was built especially for the middle class. The two-seater was small and agile compared to other cars of this time and was used by many doctors for house calls whereby the vehicle quickly got the nickname "doctor's car". The low price of 3,950 Mark made it a very successful model.

The doctor's car was the first car from Opel, which bore the Opel lettering on the radiator.

Opel campaigned for the Type 4/8 PS (hp) with statements, such as "Simple mechanism", "Incredibly easy to use", and most of all: "Without using a chauffeur".

== Engine ==
The Opel 4/8 PS is driven by a water-cooled four-cylinder engine with a displacement of 1029 cc. The performance is eight horsepower, reaching a top speed of 60 km/h.
