= Opel Kapitän =

German car model

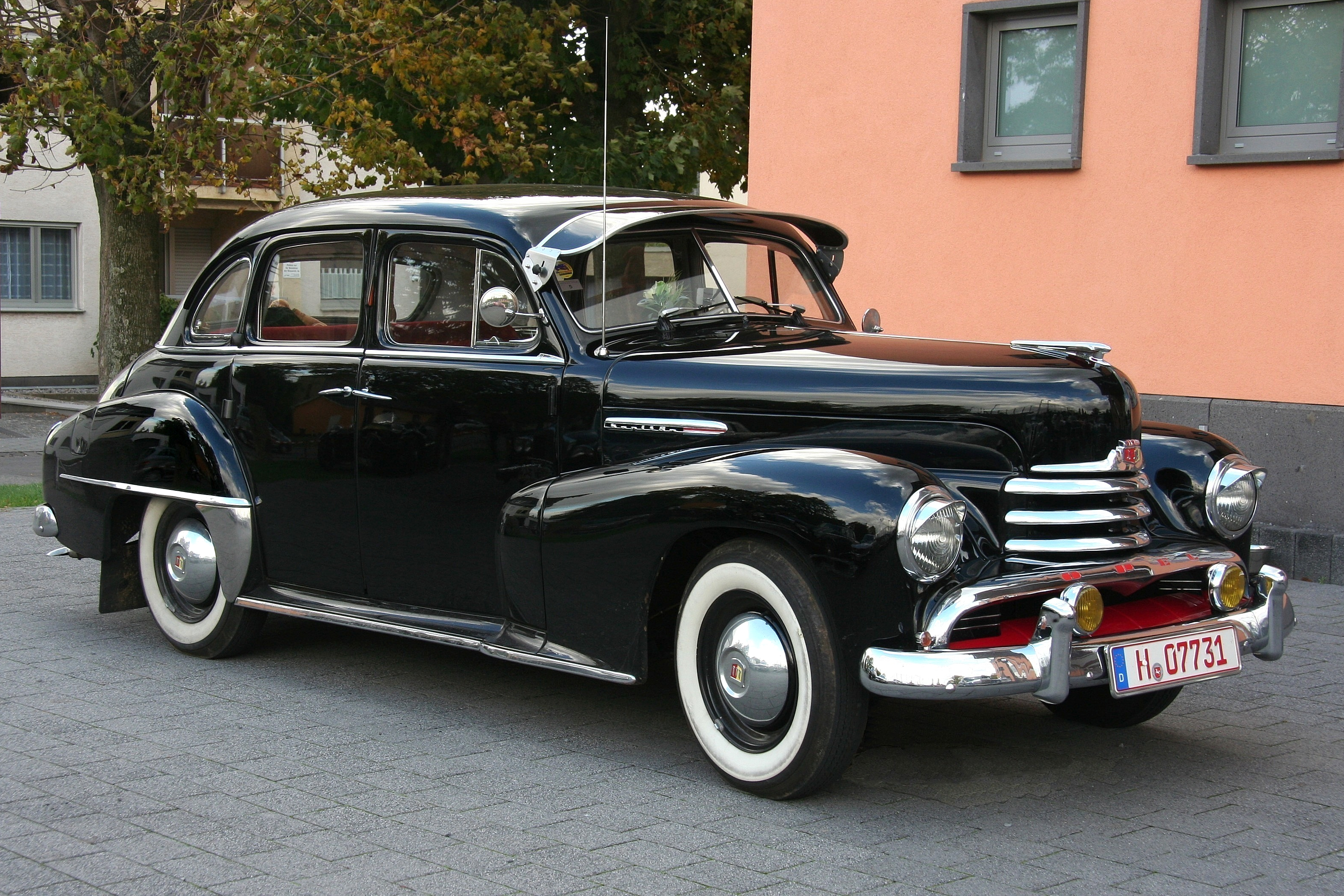

Overview
- Manufacturer: Opel
- Production: 1938–1970
- Assembly: Germany: Rüsselsheim

Body and chassis
- Class: Luxury car (F)
- Body style: 4-door saloon 2-door coupe cabriolet
- Layout: FR layout

Chronology
- Predecessor: Opel Super 6
- Successor: Opel Diplomat

The Opel Kapitän is a luxury car made in several different generations by the German car manufacturer Opel from 1938 until 1970.

== Kapitän (1938–1940) ==
Kapitän
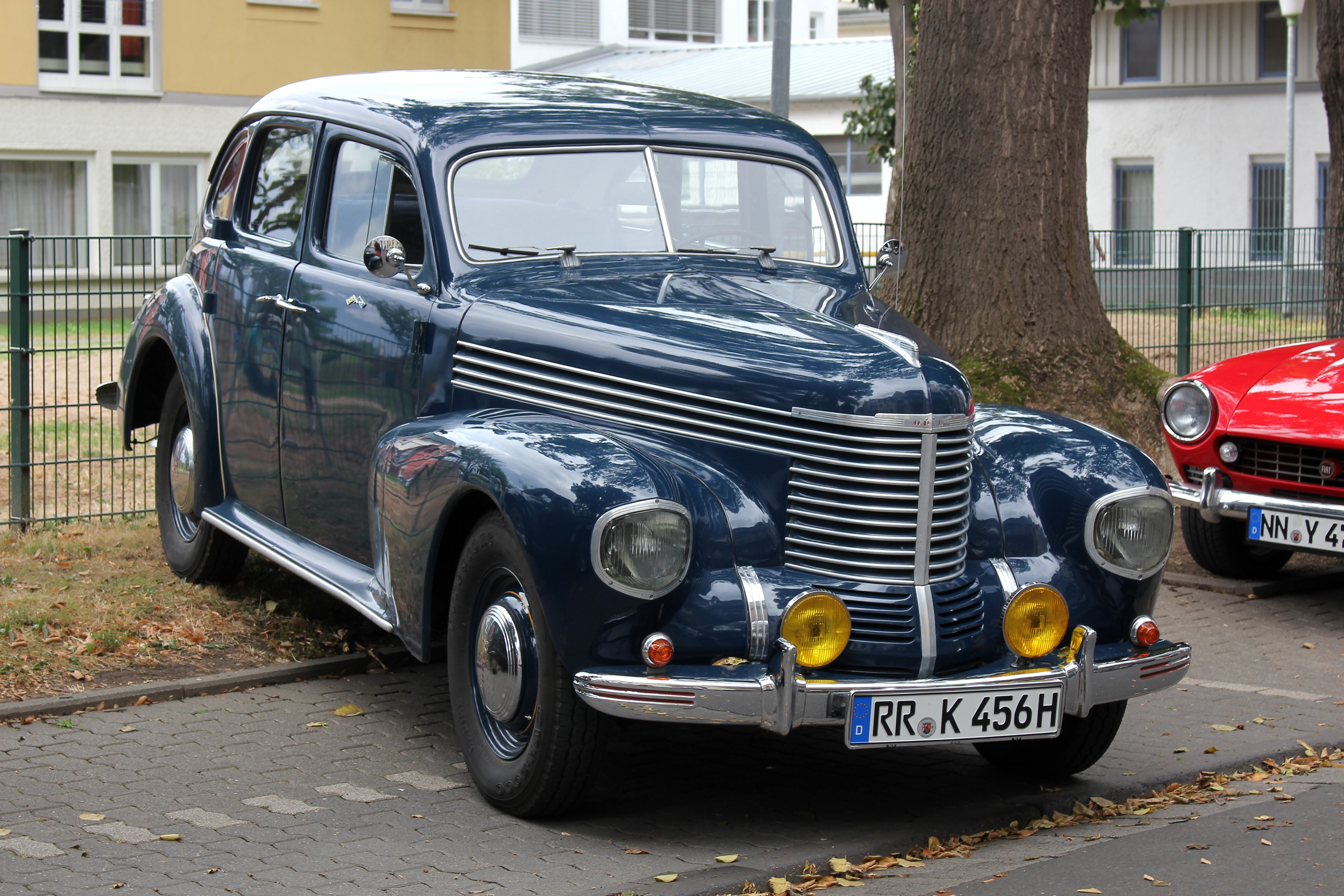

Overview
- Production: 1938–1940

Powertrain
- Engine: 2.5 L I6
- Transmission: 3-speed manual

The Kapitän was the last new Opel model to appear before the outbreak of the Second World War, developed during 1938 and launched in the spring of 1939 at the Geneva motor show. Production began in November 1938. The first Kapitän was available in many different body styles, the most popular one being the 4-door saloon. 2-door coupé cabriolets were also built. The pre-war Kapitän featured a unitary body, an innovative feature for its time; it was studied by the Soviet engineers and influenced the design of the GAZ-M20 Pobeda. The Kapitän inherited its 2.5-litre engine from its predecessor: in this application a maximum speed of 118 km/h (73 mph) was reported.

Civilian automobile production by Opel ceased in the Fall / Autumn of 1940, by which time 25,371 Kapitäns had been produced: a further three were assembled during 1943, giving a total production volume for the version launched in 1939 of 25,374. In addition, 2 were assembled in 1946, and one in 1947, but these were not officially recorded in the statistics.

Included in the production total were 248 of the two-seater cabriolets built for Opel by independent coach builders Gläser of Dresden and Hebmüller of Wülfrath in Wuppertal. There would, however, be no resurrection for the cabriolet Kapitäns in 1948 when the saloon version was reintroduced.

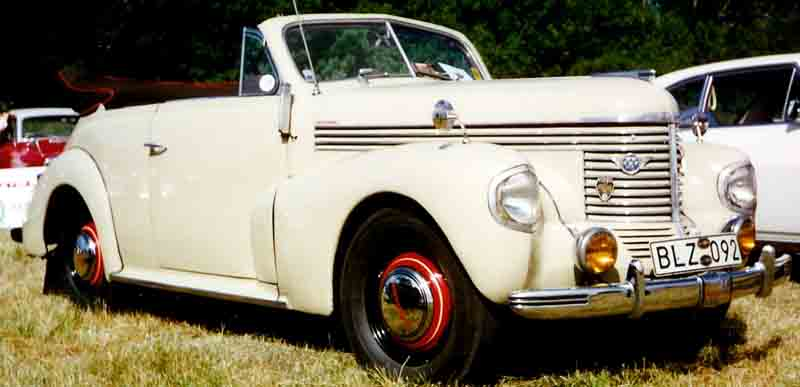
1939 Opel Kapitän cabriolet

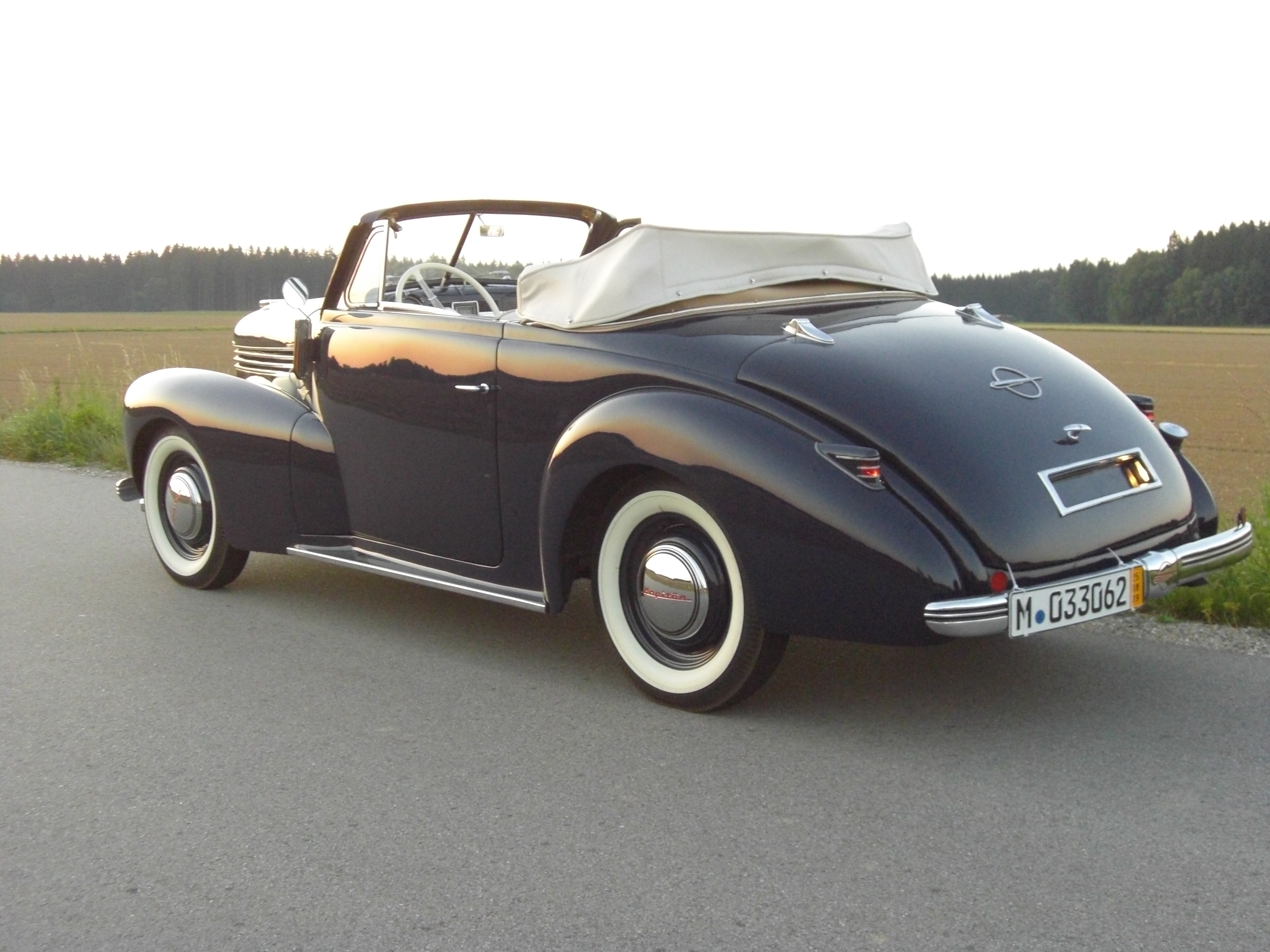

== Kapitän (1948–1951) ==
Kapitän
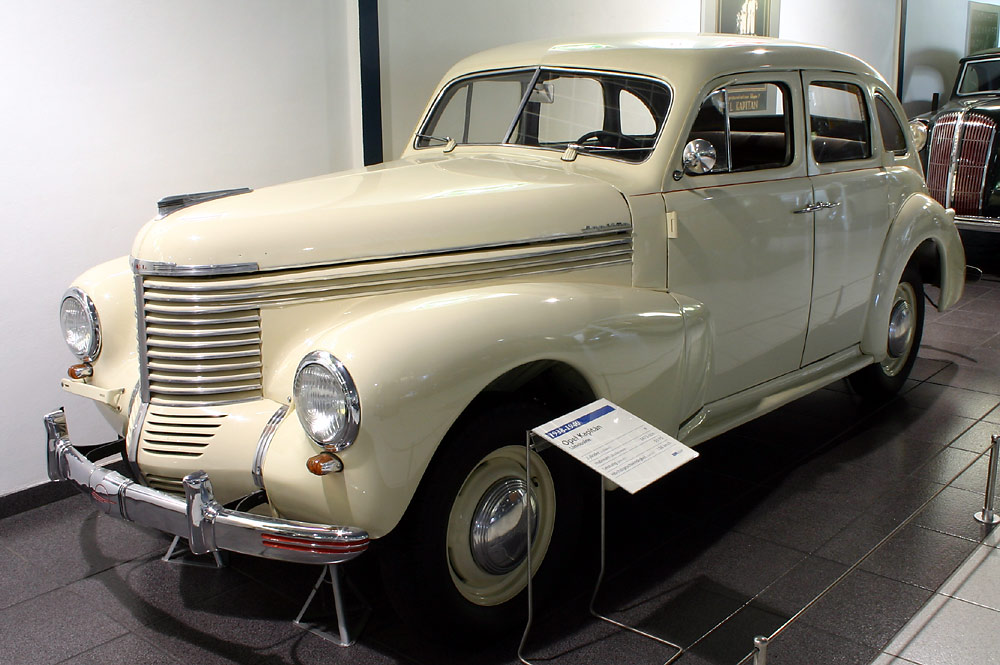

Overview
- Production: 1948–1950

Powertrain
- Engine: 2.5 L I6
- Transmission: 3-speed manual

Dimensions
- Wheelbase: 2,695 mm (106.1 in)
- Length: 4,620 mm (181.9 in)
- Width: 1,660 mm (65.4 in)
- Height: 1,640 mm (64.6 in)
- Curb weight: 1,230 kg (2,711.7 lb)

In October 1948, the Kapitän was reintroduced as Germany's first post-war six-cylinder automobile. It would have made sense to start building the Kapitän a year earlier, as the engine was also used in the Opel Blitz trucks at the time, but the occupation regulations prohibited civilian sales of passenger cars of over 1.5 litres displacement. Initial production was reserved for the occupying powers, but sales to private customers started in 1949. There was no sign of the wide range of coupé and cabriolet bodies that had broadened the model's appeal in the 1930s: the 1948 Kapitän was offered only as a saloon/sedan, based on the 1939 version.

The main differences from the pre-war model were round headlights as opposed to hexagonal ones, as well as improved leaf springs and dampers. From May 1950 the dashboard was redesigned and the shifter was relocated from the floor to the steering column. With 55 PS (40 kW; 54 hp), the first post-war Kapitän could reach a top speed of 126 km/h (78.3 mph), needed 29 seconds to reach 100 km/h (62 mph), and consumed 13 litres per 100 kilometres (22 mpg_{‑imp}; 18 mpg_{‑US}) in the process.

Up to February 1951, 30,431 Kapitäns were built.

== Kapitän (1951–1953) ==
Kapitän
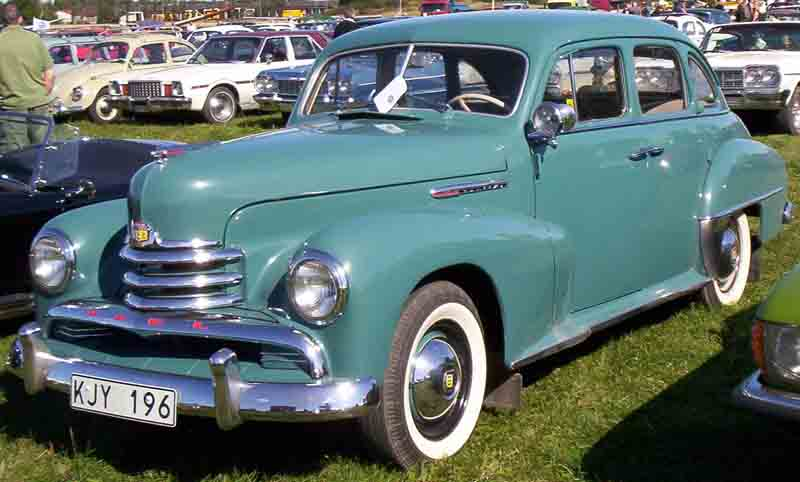

Overview
- Production: 1951–1953

Powertrain
- Engine: 2.5 L I6
- Transmission: 3-speed manual

Dimensions
- Wheelbase: 2,695 mm (106.1 in)
- Length: 4,715 mm (185.6 in)
- Width: 1,720 mm (67.7 in)
- Height: 1,625 mm (64.0 in)
- Curb weight: 1,240 kg (2,733.7 lb)

The 1951 Kapitän, introduced in March 1951, was a stylistically slightly modernized version of the old model; technically it was much the same. The engine's compression ratio rose from 6.0:1 to 6.25:1, its output from 55 PS (40 kW; 54 hp) to 58 PS (43 kW; 57 hp).

From the outside the car was readily distinguished from the first post-war Kapitäns, thanks to an abundance of chrome and a US style grille at the front. This was the most modern large mass-produced car in Europe during the immediate pre-and postwar years. Competitive Mercedes models with flat, upright, one piece windscreen and external headlamps seemed from another age in spite of their greater prestige value. The result was that this solidly built and comfortable car lost rapidly in value and maintenance effort, with few second-hand buyers being able to afford to tax and insure a 2.5-litre engine at the time. Power later increased to 60 PS (44 kW; 59 hp), as better petrol quality allowed manufacturers to increase compression ratios.

From March 1951 up to July 1953, Opel built 48,562 cars of this series.

== Kapitän (1953–1958) ==
Kapitän
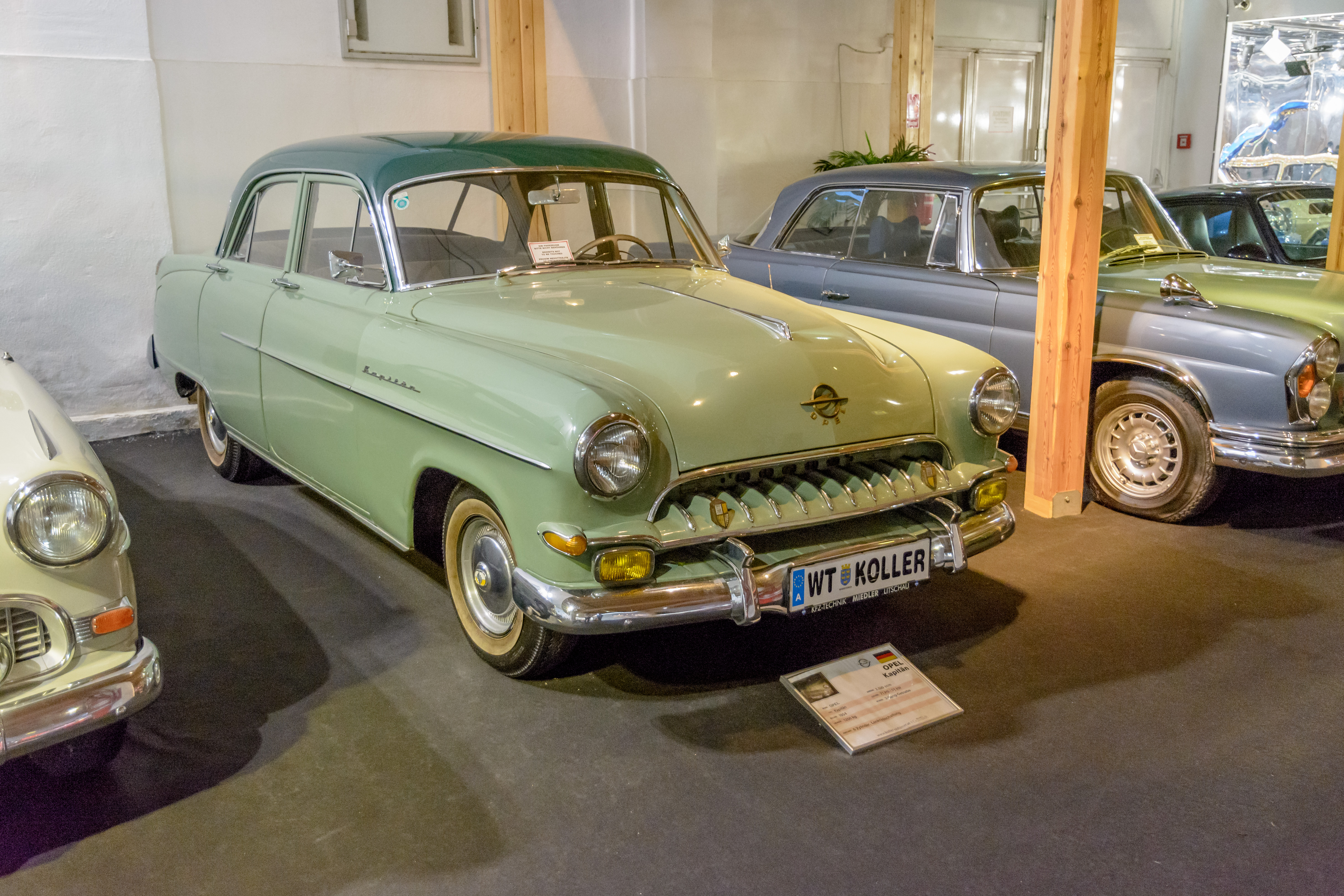

Overview
- Production: 1953–1958

Powertrain
- Engine: 2.5 L I6
- Transmission: 3-speed manual; 4-speed overdrive transmission

Dimensions
- Wheelbase: 2,750 mm (108.3 in)
- Length: 4,710–4,735 mm (185.4–186.4 in)
- Width: 1,760 mm (69.3 in)
- Height: 1,600–1,560 mm (63.0–61.4 in)
- Curb weight: 1,250–1,300 kg (2,755.8–2,866.0 lb)

In November 1953, Opel launched a completely new Kapitän that was longer and wider than its predecessor. The new generation featured a revised rear live axle, a rear stabilizing bar and slightly enlarged drum brakes. Carried over was the six-cylinder engine, though its compression ratio was raised to 7.0:1, giving 68 PS (50 kW; 67 hp) initially. For 1955, output rose to 71 PS (52 kW; 70 hp) and it was further enhanced to 75 PS (55 kW; 74 hp) for 1956.

Like the smaller Olympia Rekord, which somewhat resembled 1953 US Plymouth models (such as the Cranbrook), the Kapitän used a similar design language.

Model year 1956 saw a mild facelift with a more up-to-date grille, bezeled headlamps, larger front indicator lights and revised side trim. The 1956 reached a top speed of 140 km/h (87.0 mph) and consumed 13 L/100 km (22 mpg_{‑imp}; 18 mpg_{‑US}).

From May 1957, a semi-automatic three-speed overdrive transmission with an additional fourth gear became available on request.

From November 1953 to February 1958, 154,098 Kapitäns were built. In its time, this generation was the third-most popular car in Germany behind Volkswagen's Beetle and Opel's own Rekord (Oswald, p. 73).

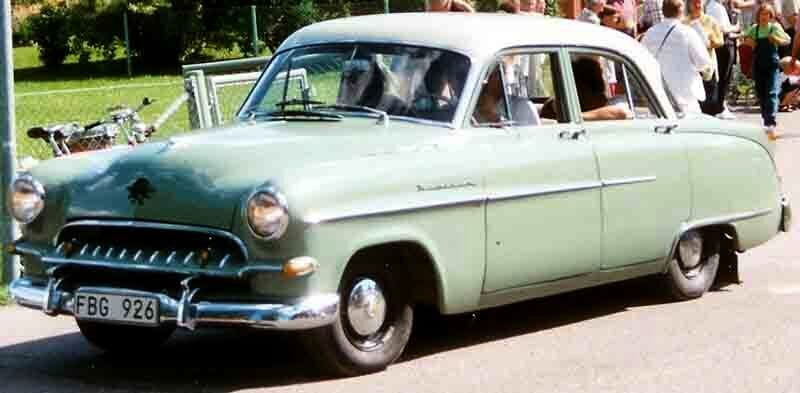
Opel Kapitän 1955

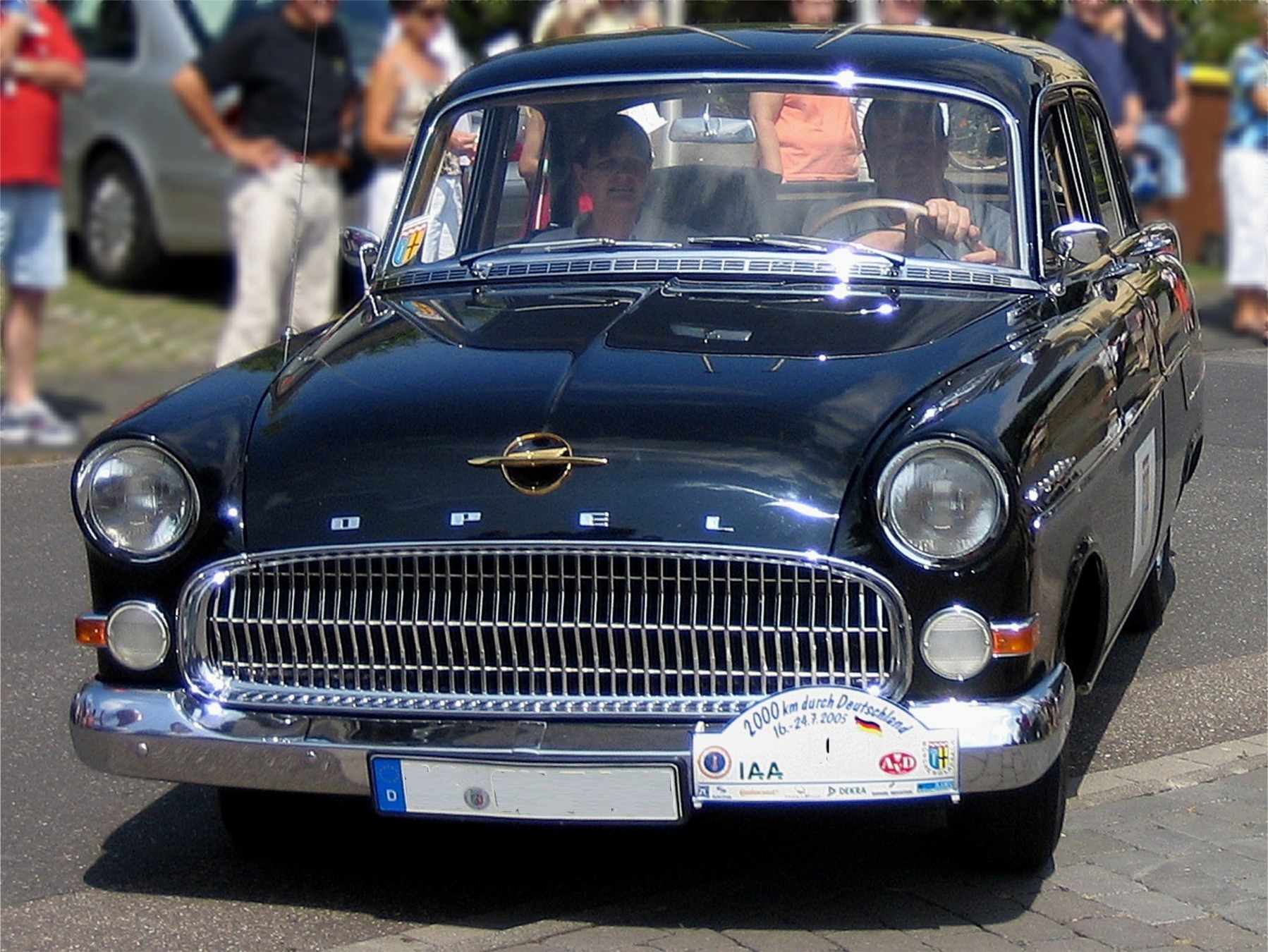
Opel Kapitän 1956/57

== Kapitän P1 (1958–1959) ==
Kapitän P1
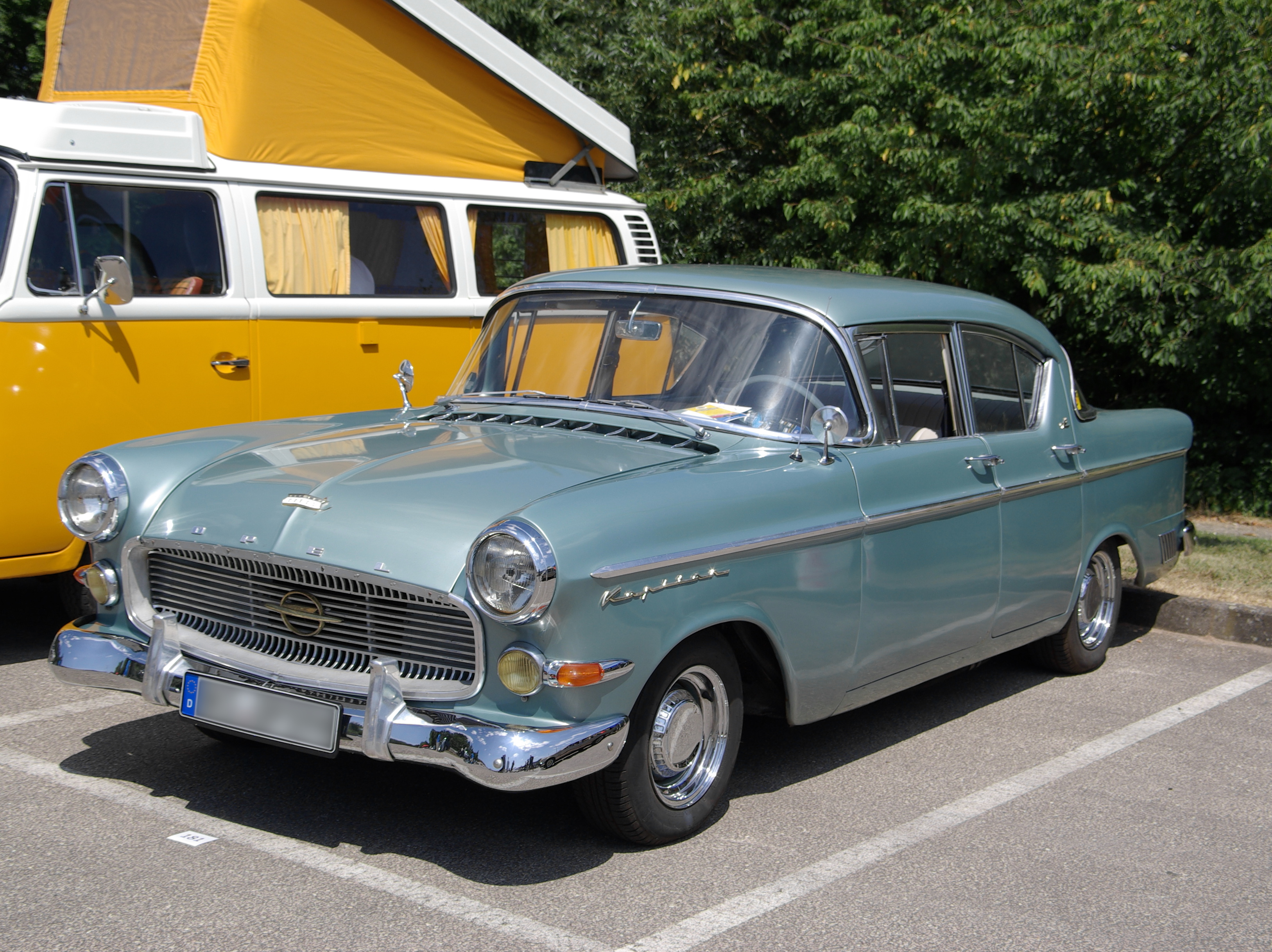

Overview
- Production: 1958–1959

Powertrain
- Engine: 2.5 L I6
- Transmission: 3-speed manual 4-speed overdrive

Dimensions
- Wheelbase: 2,800 mm (110.2 in)
- Length: 4,764 mm (187.6 in)
- Width: 1,785 mm (70.3 in)
- Height: 1,500 mm (59.1 in)
- Curb weight: 1,310 kg (2,888.1 lb)

The 1958 Kapitän (series P1), introduced in June 1958, was both wider and lower than its predecessor, and featured panoramic windows. It won some plaudits for its American-inspired "dream-car" styling, but there were also critics who pointed out that the extent of the wrap-around front and rear windows, along with the slope of the rear roof-line, restricted the driver's view out unnecessarily and made the rear doors very narrow: many back seat passengers, once they had negotiated their way onto the back seat had headroom issues. Vauxhall also offered a similarly styled car, the Vauxhall Velox and Cresta PA.

This time, the 2,473 cc six cylinder engine had its maximum output raised to 80 PS (59 kW; 79 hp) at 4,100 rpm. Wheelbase, track widths, length and width were all slightly increased, while a flatter roof made the car some 6 centimetres (2.4 in) lower.

The P1 was built only for one year. From June 1958 to June 1959, 34,282 were produced, which was fewer cars than the annualized output of either its direct predecessor or of its direct successor.

== Kapitän P2 (1959–1963) ==
Kapitän P2
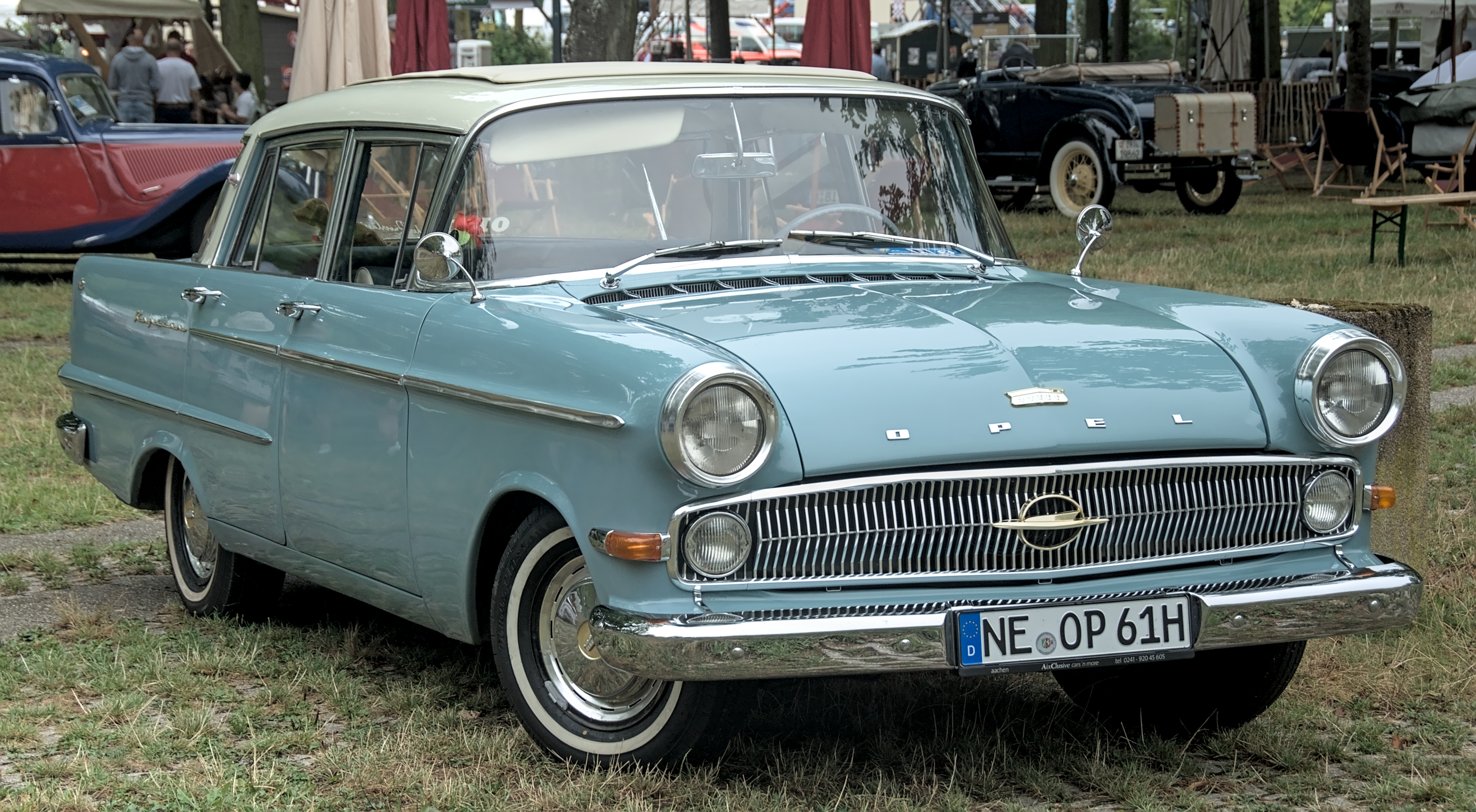

Overview
- Production: 1959–1963

Powertrain
- Engine: 2.6 L I6
- Transmission: 3-speed manual; 4-speed manual w/ overdrive; 3-speed Hydra-Matic automatic

Dimensions
- Wheelbase: 2,800 mm (110.2 in)
- Length: 4,831 mm (190.2 in)
- Width: 1,812 mm (71.3 in)
- Height: 1,512 mm (59.5 in)
- Curb weight: 1,340 kg (2,954.2 lb)

The P2 Kapitän came to market in August 1959 and while it still had the panoramic windscreen, it gained a new grille and a revised body with a more angular roof and a new rear. It was driven by a stronger new, oversquare 2.6-litre inline six (bore × stroke: 85 × 76.5 instead of 80 × 82 mm), still of OHV and pushrod design. Carried over were the 3-speed and 4-speed overdrive transmission; the latter was replaced from December 1960 by GM's 3-speed Roto-Hydra-Matic automatic.

The P2 climbed to a top speed of 150 km/h (93.2 mph), reached 100 km/h (62 mph) in 16 seconds and consumed 12 L/100 km (24 mpg_{‑imp}; 20 mpg_{‑US}).

From August 1959 to December 1963, Opel built 145,618 units of this Kapitän series. No other Opel Kapitän model, before or subsequently, achieved such a high production level.

The large Opels were never dominating players in their market segment on the same scale as the smaller Rekord and Kadett models, possibly due to the strength of Mercedes-Benz in the big car sector. Nevertheless, the highpoint for the big Opels was 1960 when together the Kapitän and Admiral were Europe's top-selling six-cylinder saloons, with nearly 48,000 sold.

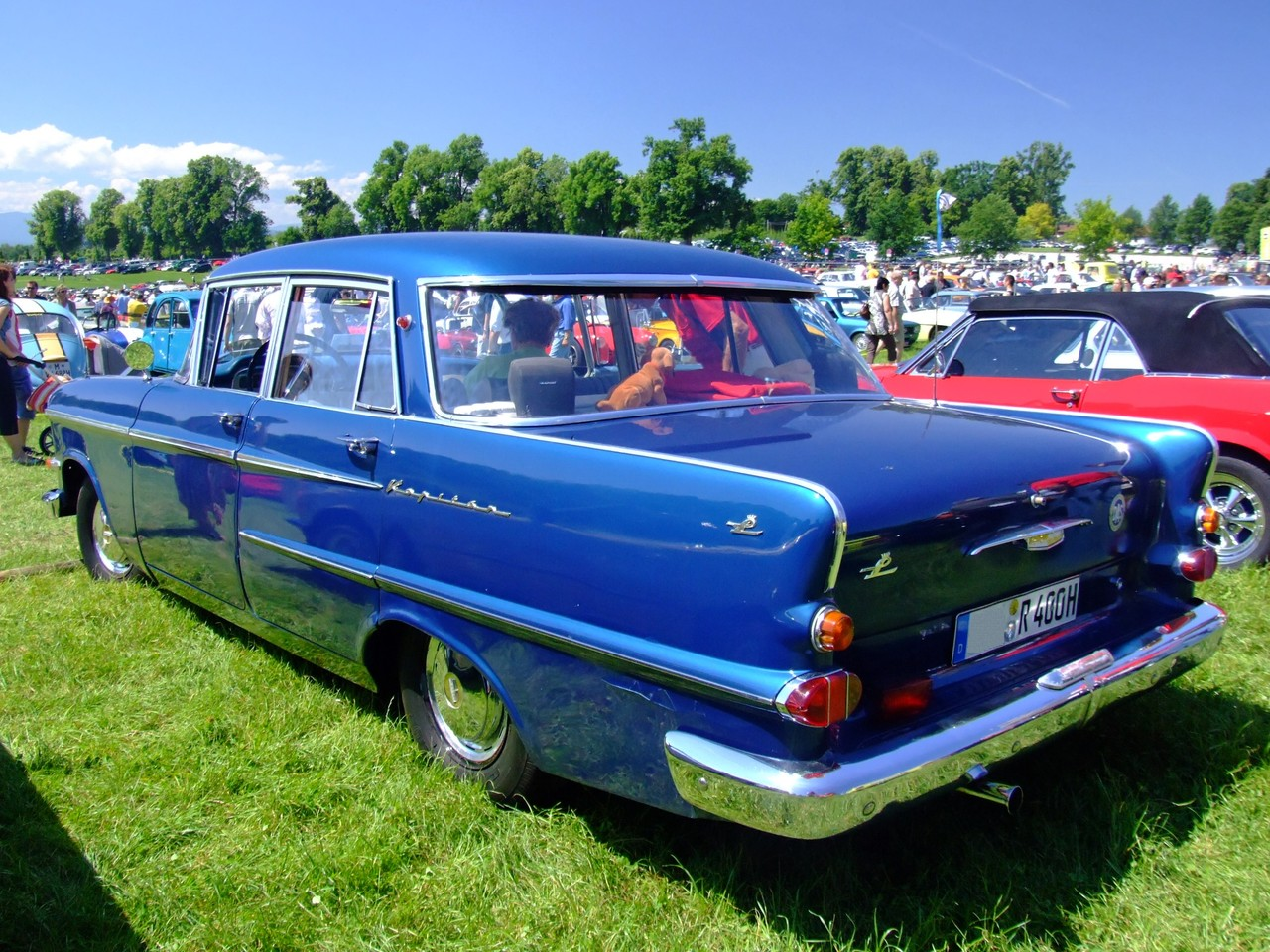
1959 Opel Kapitän P2

== Kapitän A (1964–1968) ==
Kapitän A
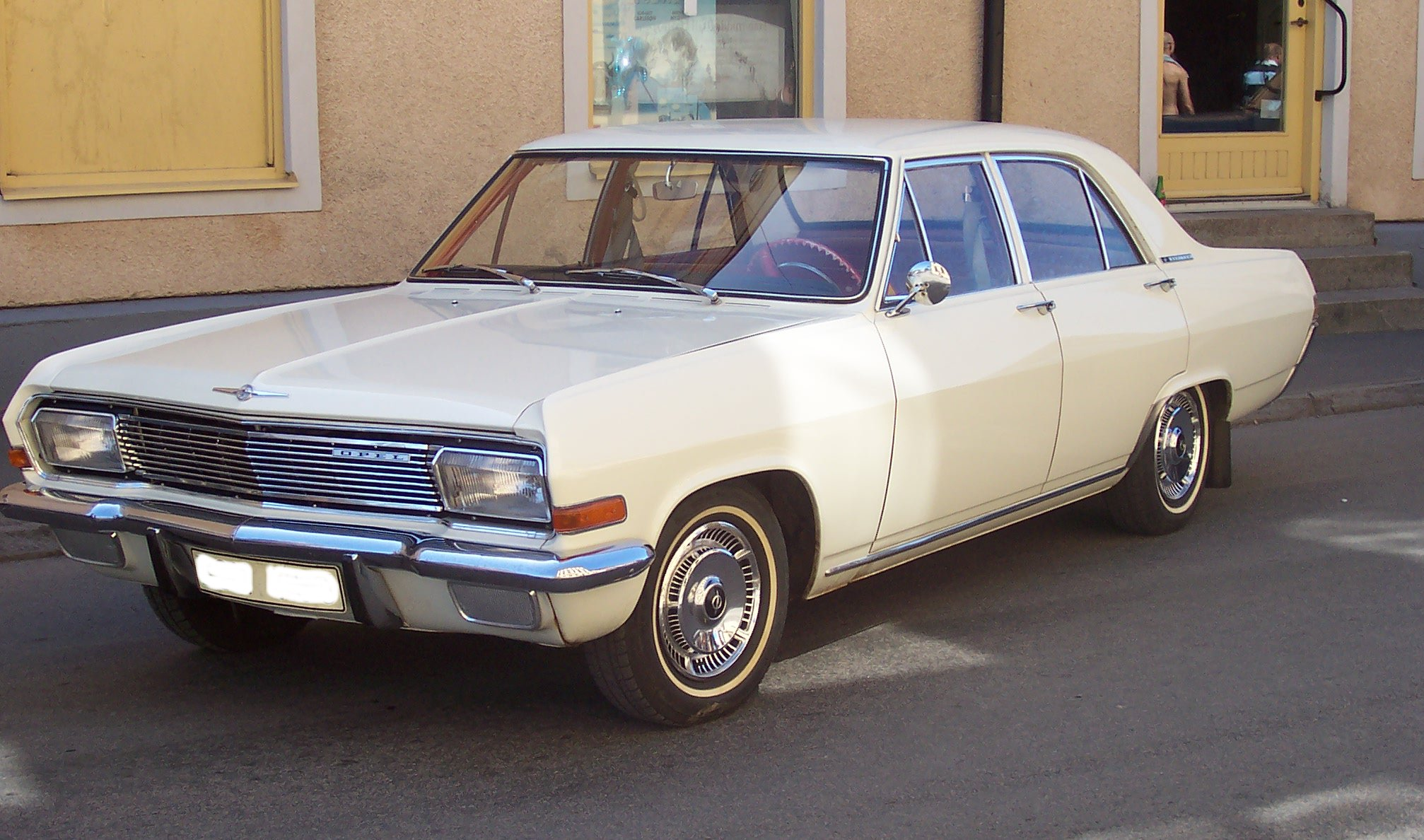

Overview
- Production: 1964–1968
- Designer: Clare MacKichan

Powertrain
- Engine: 2.6 L OHV I6; 2.8 L CIH I6; 4.6 L Chevrolet V8
- Transmission: 2-speed Powerglide automatic; 4-speed manual

Dimensions
- Wheelbase: 2,845 mm (112.0 in)
- Length: 4,948 mm (194.8 in)
- Width: 1,902 mm (74.9 in)
- Height: 1,445 mm (56.9 in)
- Curb weight: 1,380–1,550 kg (3,042.4–3,417.2 lb)

In 1964, Opel introduced the completely new KAD (Kapitän, Admiral, Diplomat) models; the Kapitän served as the base model of this three-tier model range. Again, there was a styling similarity with the Vauxhall Cresta PC.

It was powered by the same engines as the contemporary Opel Admiral, namely a 2.6- or a 2.8-litre inline-six; a small number of Kapitäns even received the Chevrolet-sourced 4.6-litre V8. For the Austrian market, 580 Kapitän and Admiral models received the 2.5-litre version of the CIH six with an output of 112 PS (82 kW; 110 hp) in 1966 and 1967.

Like its more expensive brethren, the Kapitän was reworked in late 1967 and received rub strips, a new ZF steering and a collapsible steering column. At the same time, a new HL (Hochleistung = high-performance) version of the 2.8-litre six became available that put out 140 PS (103 kW; 138 hp).

The new KAD was considerably larger than the predecessor, which proved a hindrance in the marketplace. Sales of the Kapitän A fell sharply off; up to its discontinuation in November 1968 a total of 24,249 cars left the factory. The costlier Admiral and Diplomat models actually sold better.

== Kapitän B (1969–1970) ==
Kapitän B
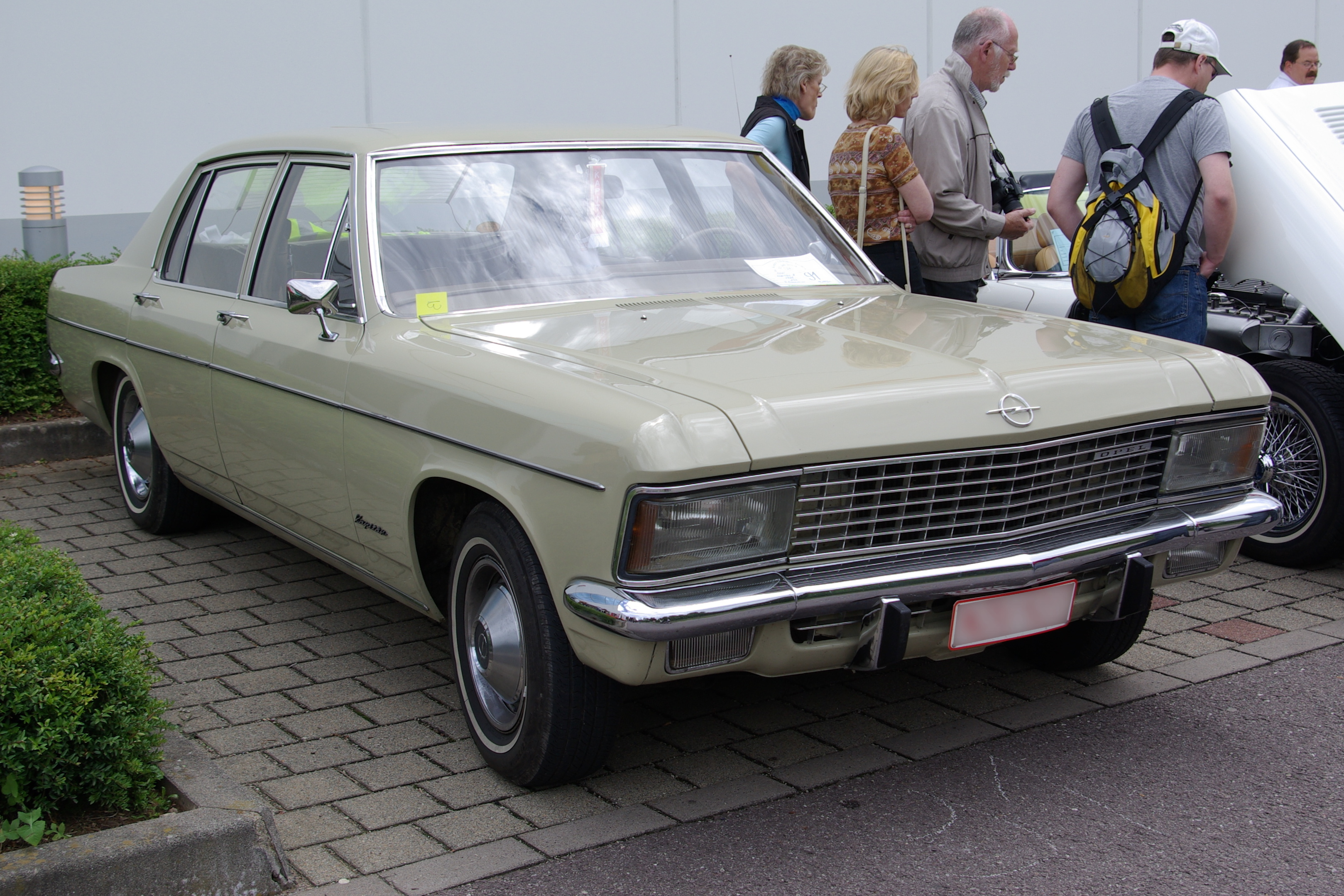

Overview
- Production: 1969–1970

Powertrain
- Engine: 2.8 L CIH I6
- Transmission: 4-speed manual; 3-speed automatic

Dimensions
- Wheelbase: 2,845 mm (112.0 in)
- Length: 4,907 mm (193.2 in)
- Width: 1,852 mm (72.9 in)
- Height: 1,450 mm (57.1 in)
- Curb weight: 1,475–1,495 kg (3,251.8–3,295.9 lb)

The Kapitän B was introduced in March 1969 and was the last car bearing the Kapitän name. Engine options included a single-barrel carburetted 2.8-litre inline-six or a two-barrel version of the same, coupled either with a 4-speed manual or Opel's 3-speed automatic transmission. The modernized body was marginally shorter and narrower, by about 5 centimetres (2 in) in both dimensions, but still proved too large and American-looking for European buyers.

Production ended in May 1970, as buyers of large cars preferred more equipment and prestige. The more up-market Admiral and Diplomat lived on until July 1976 and July 1977, respectively. After a brief period without a full-sized Opel, the range was replaced by the Senator in 1978.

Only 4,976 Kapitän B models were built in 15 months.

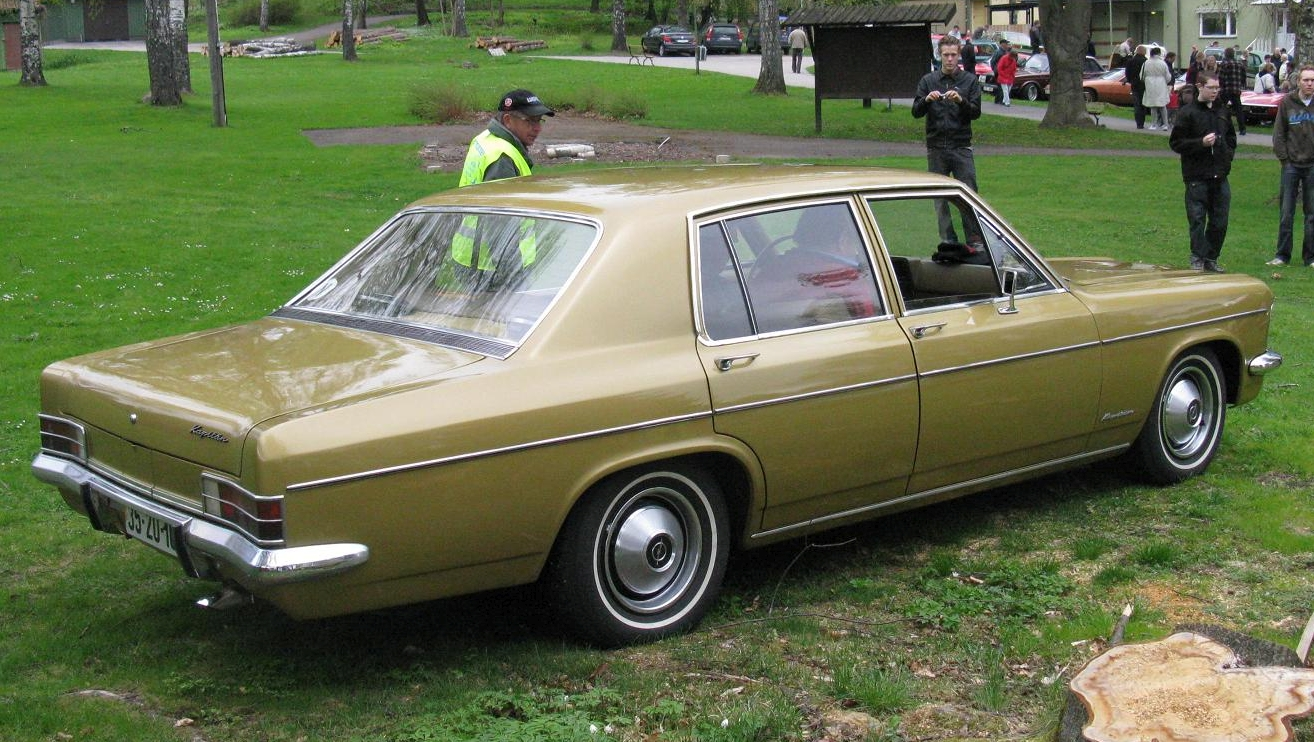
Rear view

== See also the other two "KAD" cars ==
- Opel Admiral
- Opel Diplomat

== Military operators ==
- The British Army used the Opel Kapitän for intelligence gathering on the BRIXMIS Missions.

== Sources ==
- Werner Oswald, Deutsche Autos 1945–1976. Motorbuch Verlag, Stuttgart 1975 edition. ISBN 978-3-87943-391-9.
- Oswald, Werner (2003). Deutsche Autos 1945–1990, Band (vol) 3 (in German). Motorbuch Verlag. ISBN 3-613-02116-1.
- Phil Seeds' Virtual Car Museum
- KAD Historie
