= Opel 5/12 PS =

Opel 5/12 PS Opel Puppchen
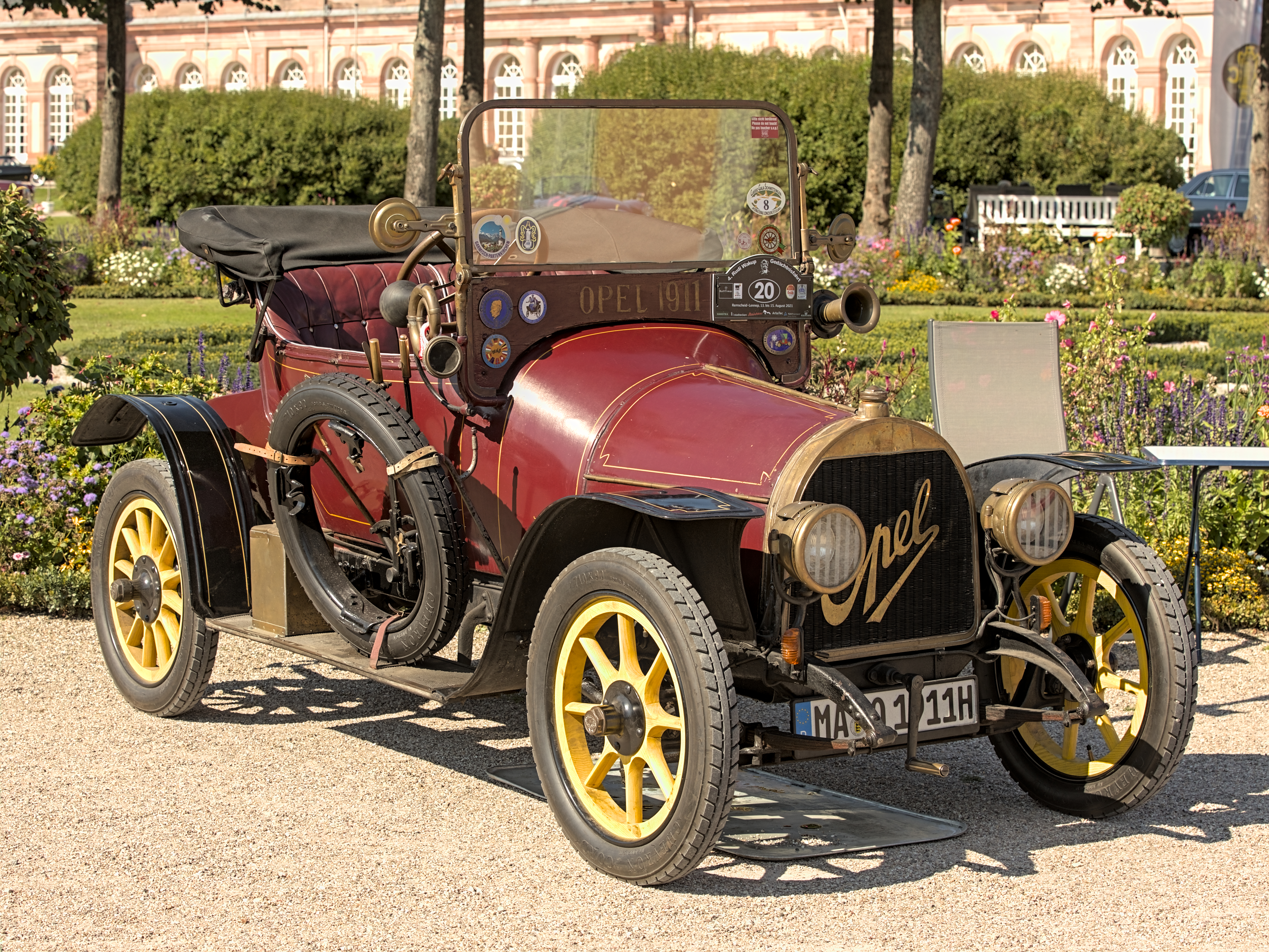

Overview
- Manufacturer: Opel
- Production: 1911–1920

Dimensions
- Wheelbase: 2,400 mm (94.5 in)
- Length: 3,500 mm (137.8 in)
- Width: 1,500 mm (59.1 in)
- Height: 2,300 mm (90.6 in)

The Opel 5/12 PS, also known as the Puppchen (German for Doll), is a small car from the German automaker Opel. It was built from 1911 to 1920 in four series. It was available as an open two seater, a Landaulet, or as a limousine.

== 5/12 PS (1911) ==
The first built series had a 1.2 liter engine with 12 PS at 1800 rpm. The top speed was 50–55 km/h. The car cost between 4,000 and 5,200 Mark.

== 5/12 PS (1912-1914) ==
The second series had a larger and more powerful engine. The engine capacity was 1.3 liters. It made 14,5 PS at 1800 rpm. The car cost between 4,200 and 5,200 Mark.

== 5/12 (5/14) PS (1914) ==
The same power capacity was increased to 1.4 liters. It was available as an open top four seater. This model variant was nicknamed "little doll" and cost 7,300 Mark.

== 5/12 (5/14) PS (1916-1920) ==
From 1916, the car received a 1.5 liter engine with 14.5 PS at 1800 rpm. It cost as a two- and four seater 5,300 Mark.
