= Opel 10/30 (10/35) PS =

Opel 10/30 PS (1922 - 1924) Opel 10/35 PS (1924)
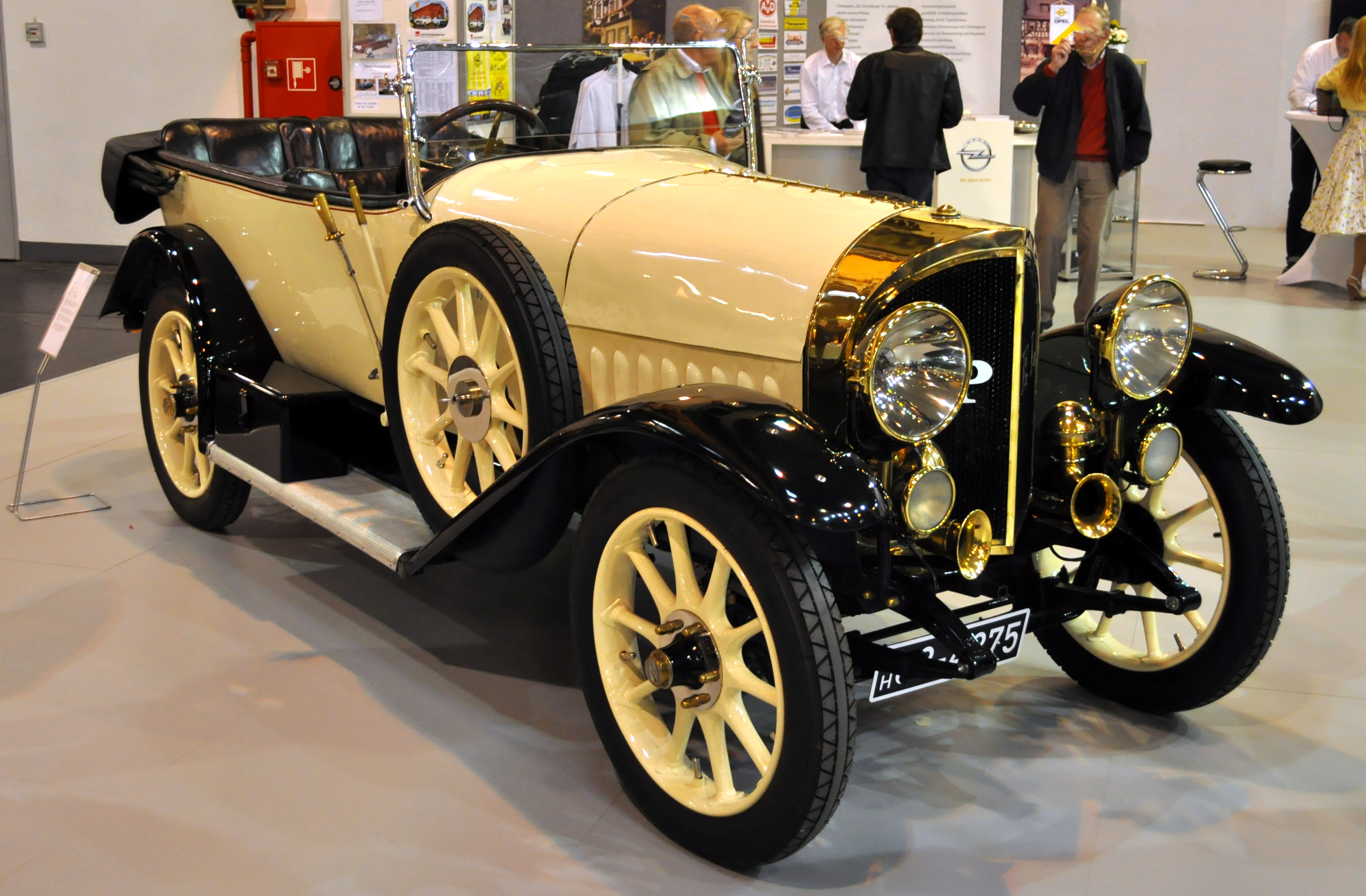

Overview
- Manufacturer: Opel
- Production: 1922–1924

Body and chassis
- Class: Luxury car

Dimensions
- Wheelbase: 3,155 mm (124.2 in)
- Length: 4,500 mm (177.2 in)
- Width: 1,700 mm (66.9 in)
- Height: 2,300 mm (90.6 in)

Chronology
- Successor: Opel Regent

The Opel 10/30 (10/35) PS is a Luxury car produced by the German automaker Opel, and was built from 1922 to 1924. It was available as an open topped six seater or as a six-seater sedan. Because of its arrow shaped radiator it was also known as "pointed nose". The 2.6 litre four cylinder engine delivered 30 PS (22 kW; 30 hp) at 1600 rpm, but in the middle of 1924 claimed maximum output was increased to 35 PS (26 kW; 35 hp).

The six seater sedan cost 12,000 and the open six seater 10,500 Goldmark in 1934.
