= Opel Regent =

Opel Regent 24/110
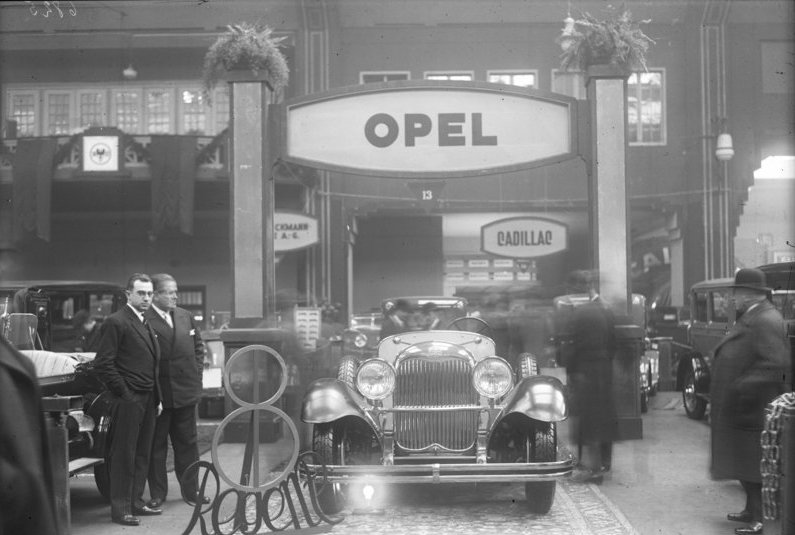
- Opel Regent shown at the IAA Internationale Automobil-Ausstellung in Berlin, November 1928

Overview
- Manufacturer: Opel
- Production: 1928–1929
- Assembly: Germany: Rüsselsheim

Body and chassis
- Class: Luxury car
- Body style: 4-door sedan, 2-door coupe, 6-door limousine

Powertrain
- Engine: 8-cylinder

Dimensions
- Wheelbase: 3,700 mm (145.7 in)
- Length: 5,400 mm (212.6 in)
- Width: 1,830 mm (72.0 in)
- Height: 1,760 mm (69.3 in)
- Curb weight: 2,200 kg (4,850 lb)

Chronology
- Predecessor: Opel 10/30 (10/35) PS
- Successor: Opel 1.8 litre

The Opel Regent was a luxury car from the German carmaker Opel introduced in November 1928 and available as a four-door limousine and two-door coupe. The official name was Opel 24/110 (24 Steuer-PS/110 PS nominal).

The 5,400 mm (212.6 in) long Regent was available from 25,000 Reichsmark, and had an eight-cylinder engine with 6 litre capacity that allowed a top speed of 130 km/h (80.8 mph). The Regent is notable for being Opel's most luxurious vehicle and competed with the likes of Rolls-Royce, Bugatti, and Mercedes-Benz.

In March 1929, General Motors bought 80% of the share capital of Adam Opel AG. Since GM feared too much competition with the top models of its own brands Cadillac and Buick, the Regent was discontinued. GM purchased back all models that had been purchased and scrapped them in an event described as unique by various automotive historians. This means that no Regent has survived but the car's Blueprints are preserved.

The name Regent was later used for the all-steel bodied versions of the 1932 Opel Regent 1.8 Litre. However, the Opel Regent 1.8 Litre was much smaller and less powerful than the original Regent and was never seen as its true successor. It would not be until 1937 that Opel would re-enter the luxury car market with the Opel Admiral.
