= Opel Patent Motor Car =

Opel Patent Motor Car, System Lutzmann
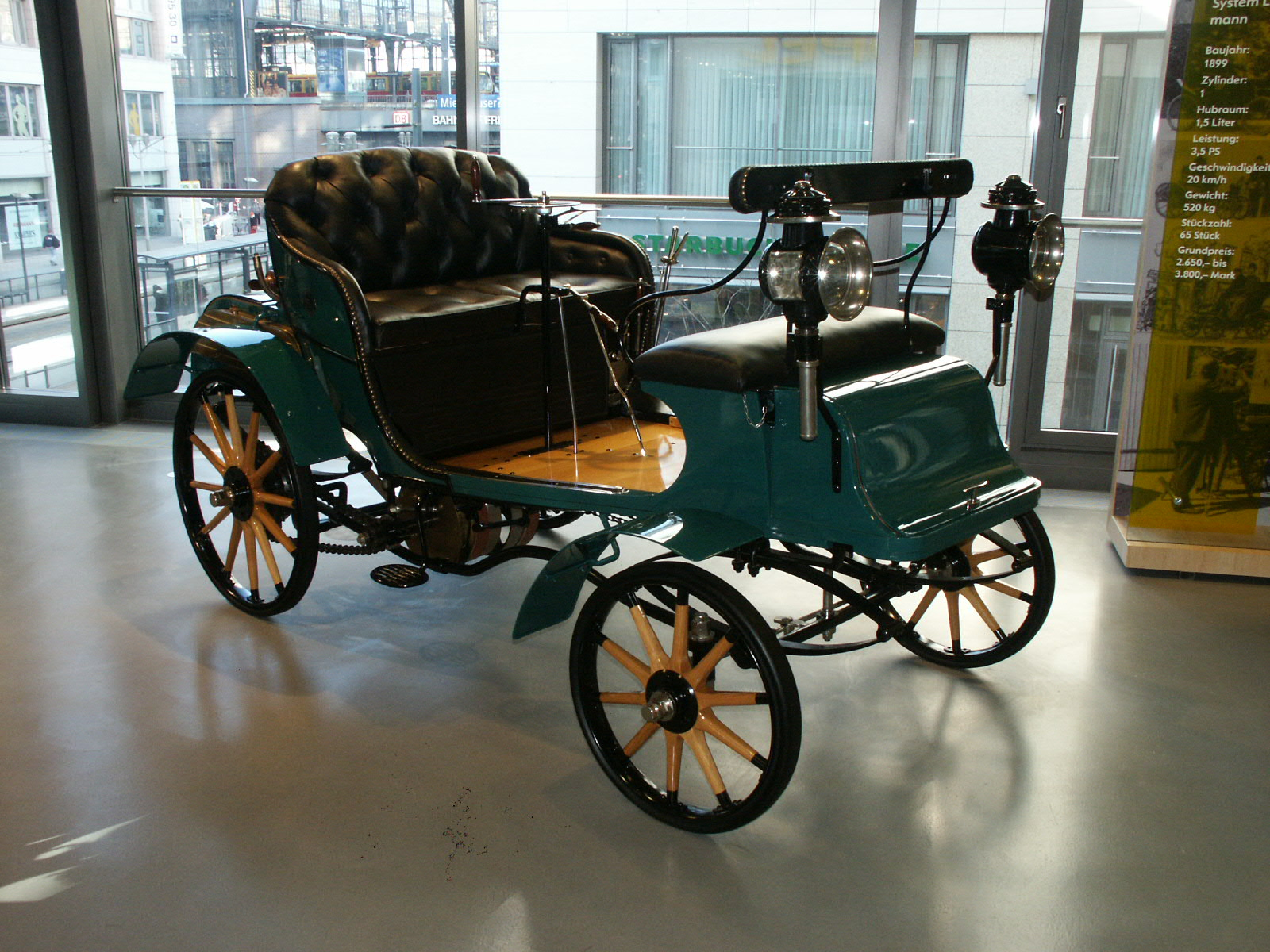

Overview
- Manufacturer: Opel
- Production: 1899–1902
- Assembly: Rüsselsheim, Germany

Powertrain
- Engine: Otto engine: 1.5 liter, 3.5 PS (3.5 hp)

Dimensions
- Wheelbase: 1,350 mm (53.1 in)
- Length: 2,150 mm (84.6 in)
- Width: 1,440 mm (56.7 in)
- Height: 1,350 mm (53.1 in)
- Curb weight: 520 kg (1,146.4 lb)

The Opel Patent Motor Car, System Lutzmann (Opel Patentmotorwagen „System Lutzmann“ in German) is the first car from the German automaker Opel. Only 65 vehicles were produced from 1899 to 1902.

== Sources ==
Marcus Schneider: Deutsche Automobile. Edition XXL, Fränkisch-Crumbach 2005, ISBN 3-89736-327-5, S. 270 (German)
