= Opel Vivaro =

The Opel Vivaro, a light commercial vehicle, which is also sold in the United Kingdom as the Vauxhall Vivaro, may refer to:

- The Opel Vivaro A, based on the second-generation Renault Trafic, and was produced between 2001 and 2014
- The Opel Vivaro B, based on the third-generation Renault Trafic, and was produced between 2014 and 2019
- The Opel Vivaro C, based on the third-generation Citroën Jumpy, after the entry of the Opel/Vauxhall brand in PSA Group, and is currently produced from 2019
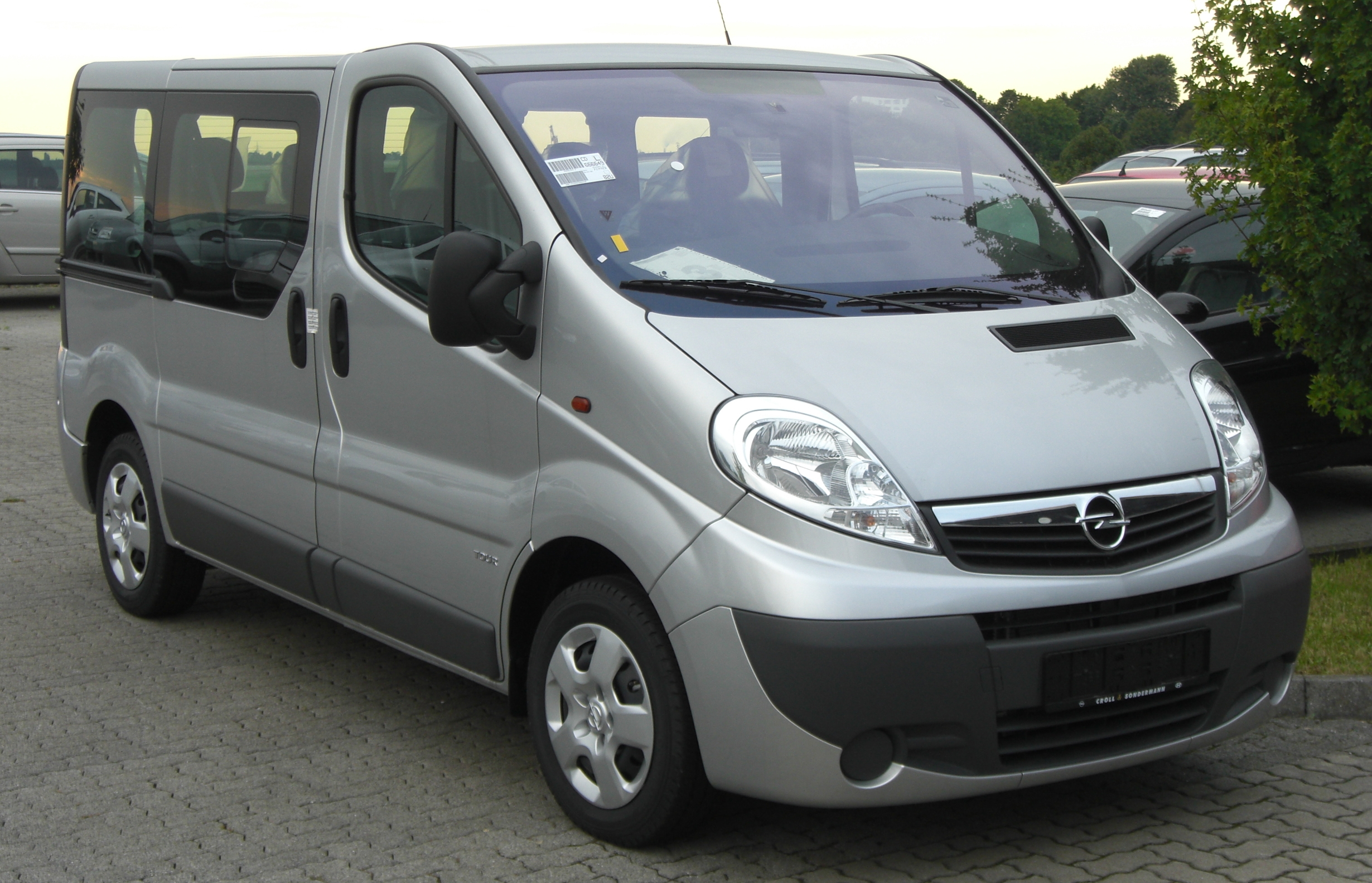
Opel Vivaro A

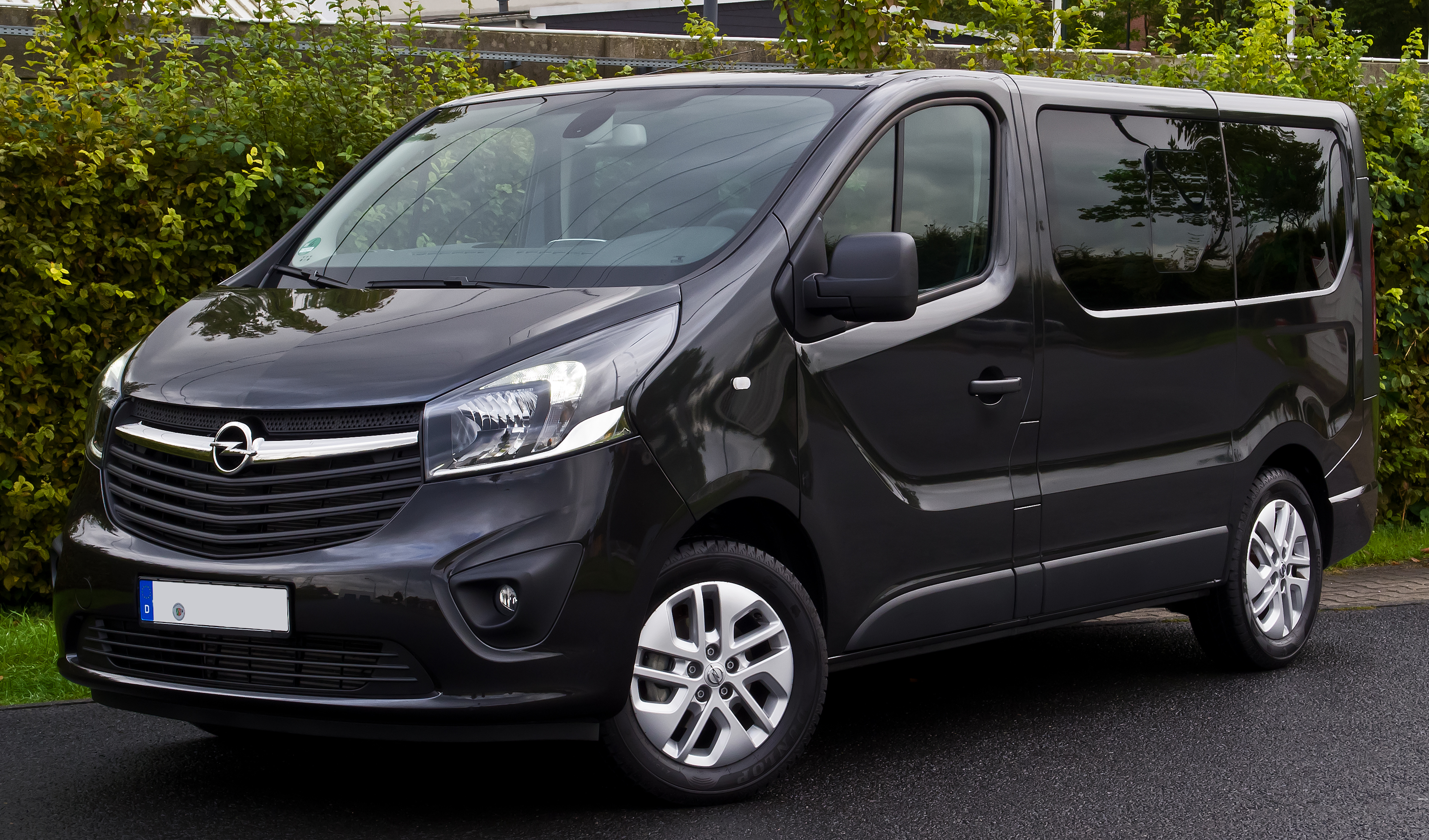
Opel Vivaro B

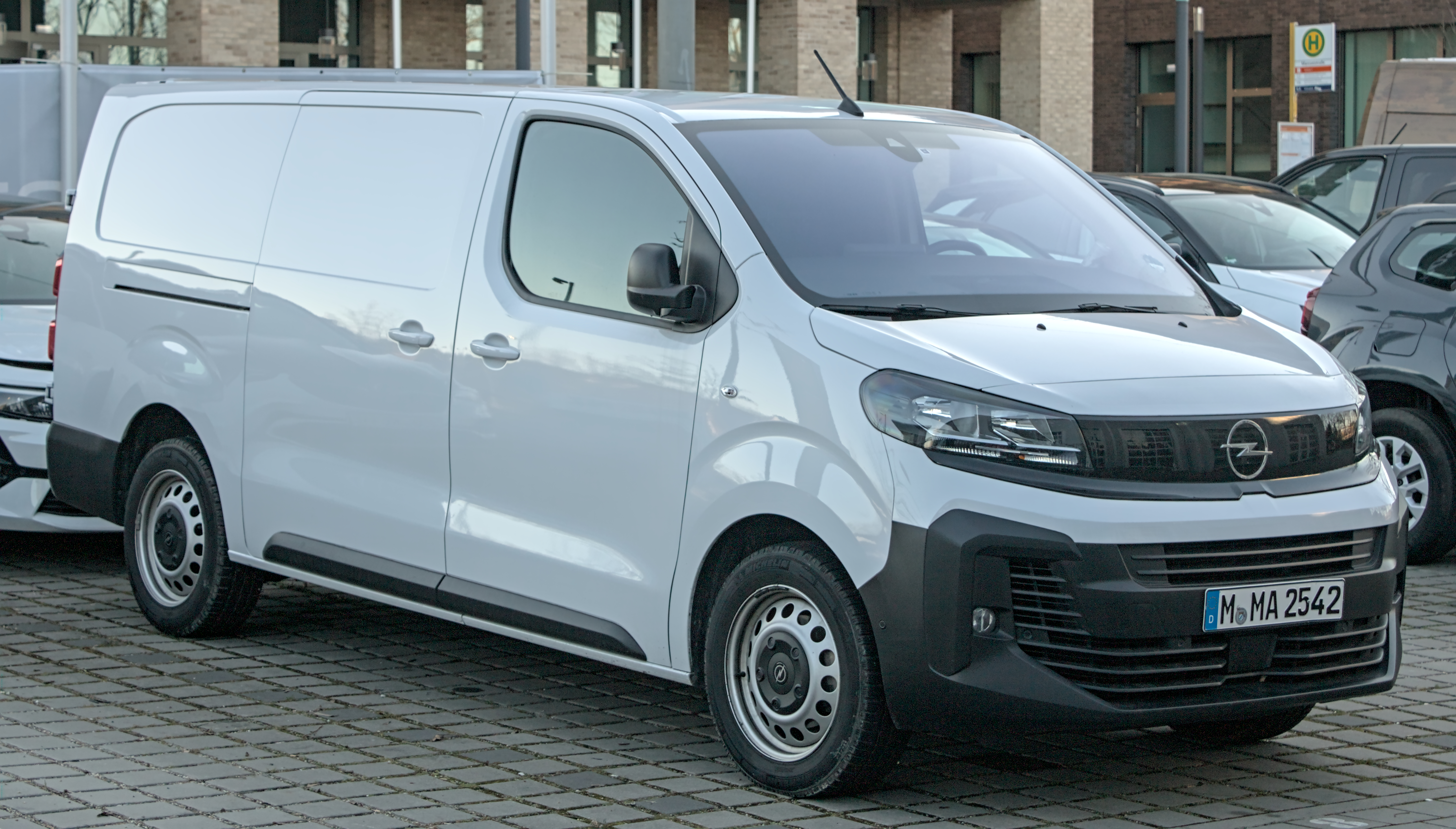
Opel Vivaro C
