= Opel 10/40 PS =

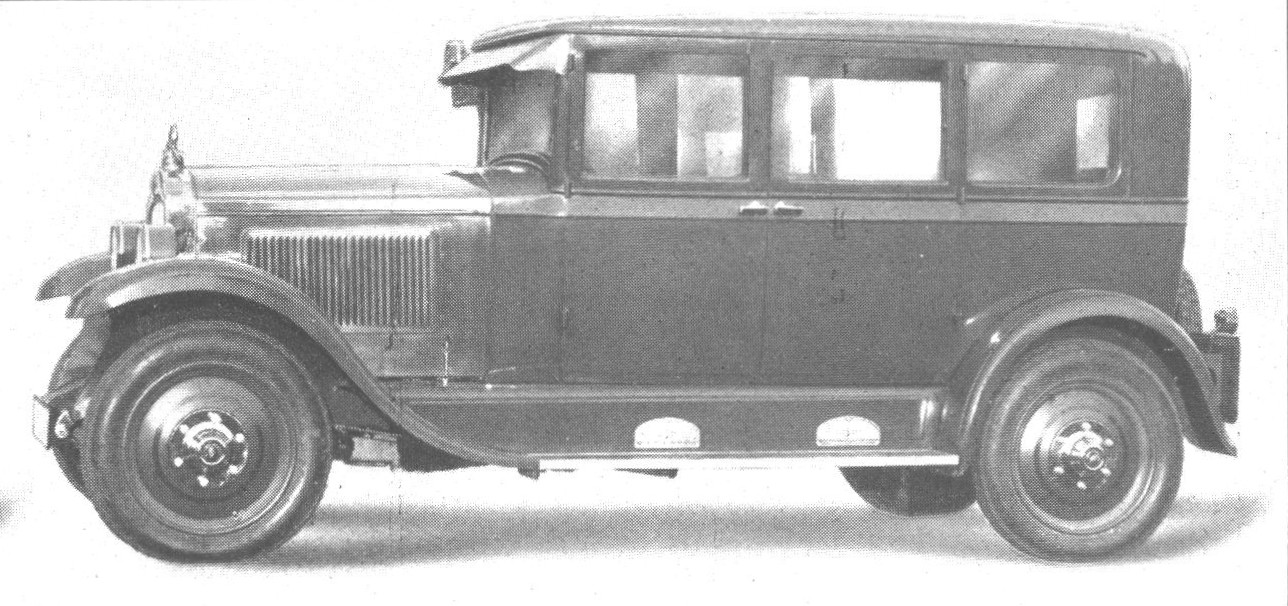
- Opel 10/40 PS in 1928.

Overview
- Manufacturer: Opel
- Also called: Opel 10/50 PS; Opel 10/45 PS
- Production: 1925–1929
- Assembly: Germany: Rüsselsheim

Body and chassis
- Class: Luxury car
- Body style: Open topped 4 door 4/5 seat “Tourenwagen” 2-door 4/5 seat “Stadt-Coupé” (City coupé); 4-door 4/5 seat “Limousine” (saloon/sedan); Long wheel base open topped 4 door 6/7 seat “Tourenwagen” Long wheelbase 4-door 6/7 seat “Limousine” (saloon/sedan) also offered in “bare chassis” form, and used by coachbuilders for various specialist bodies
- Layout: FR layout

Powertrain
- Engine: 2620 cc side-valve 4-cylinder
- Transmission: 3-speed manual

Dimensions
- Wheelbase: 3,000 mm (120 in) or 3,250 mm (128 in)
- Length: 4,150 mm (163 in) or 4,480 mm (176 in)
- Width: 1,770 mm (70 in)
- Height: 1,920 mm (76 in)

The Opel 10/40 PS is a luxury car manufactured by Opel.

The car was introduced in May 1925 as the Opel 10/50 PS, but by the time production got underway in July 1925 it had become the Opel 10/45 PS, and it very soon thereafter became the Opel 10/40 PS, a name which it retained throughout the rest of a production run which lasted until November 1929. The name followed the widely used German naming convention of the time whereby the first digit – here "10" represented the engine's tax horsepower (Steuer-PS) (effectively, in the case of German cars of the period, a linear function of the engine capacity) and the second digit represented the manufacturer's estimate of the actual horsepower. The design of the car consciously followed the example of Opel 4/14 PS, being a paragon of engineering simplicity designed for ease of manufacture.

The engine was a 2620 cc four-cylinder unit for which (after a few months of heightened optimism) the manufacturer quoted a maximum output of 40 PS (29 kW; 39 hp) at 2,800 rpm. This converted into a listed top speed of 85 km/h (53 mph) on the standard length car, and 80 km/h (50 mph) on the heavier long wheelbase version.

Most cars came with a 3,000 mm (120 in) wheelbase, intended for 4/5 seater bodywork. A longer 3,250 mm (128 in) wheelbase was also offered for 6/7 seater bodywork.

At launch in 1925 the car was priced by Opel in bare chassis form at 7,000 Marks for the standard wheelbase length and 7,600 Marks for the long wheelbase. By 1928 these prices had almost halved to 3,750 Marks and 4,000 Marks respectively. For customers happy to choose one of the standard bodies from Opel, the entry-level car was the 4/5-seater four-door Tourenwagen, a topless Torpedo-style model priced in 1925 at 8,500 Marks, which by 1928 had gone down to 4,800 Marks. There was also a 4/5-seater Limousine (sedan/saloon) and there were long-wheelbase versions of each, incorporating space for a third row of seats. The two-door 4/5-seater Stadt-Coupé ('City coupé') was the most expensive standard-wheelbase car at 10,500 Marks in 1925 and 5,400 Marks by 1928.

The production of the Opel 10/40 PS took place directly after a period of hyperinflation, and it is difficult to find clear data on consumer price inflation and deflation in the German economy as government wrestled with currency stabilisation during this period, but it is likely that for most people a significant portion of the price reductions on the Opel 10/40 PS were real money reductions. The Opel 10/40 PS was notably less expensive than cars of this size from other German automakers because Opel was the first – and at this time the only – manufacturer in Germany manufacturing cars using a Ford-inspired production line system. The approach was cheap especially where, as in the case of the 10/40 PS, the car was developed to be simple and cheap to produce. Opel were content to leave technical innovation to other manufacturers. In 1920 the government had imposed prohibitive tariffs against importing foreign automobiles, but the de facto prohibition was repealed in October 1925, and during 1925 both Ford and Chevrolet invested heavily in establishing German sales operations. After this it became possible to find cheaper cars comparable in size and concept to the Opel 10/40 PS from Chevrolet or Ford, but in reality it took a few years for the American concerns to become established in Germany, and when they did decide to build themselves significant shares of the German auto market, General Motors employed the strategy of buying Germany's leading mass market auto producer, which happened to be Opel. Meanwhile, at a time when few people could afford any sort of car, and those that could were in no position to pay premium prices, the 10/40 PS dominated its class in the mid-1920s, and is remembered as the most popular "middle class" German car of the period.

The car changed very little during its 4½ year production run, but from somewhere in the middle of 1927 the radiator was mildly redesigned and at the end of the year the Limousine-bodied cars received slightly less squared off roof edges.

Opel produced and sold 13,161 of their big four cylinder middle-class cars between 1925 and 1929, and despite the low price, they were able to sell the car profitably while other German automakers were seen to obsess over technical progress, often taking risks with the overall financial viability of their business as they did so. The Opel was a commercial success.

== Sources and further reading ==
- Oswald, Werner (2001). Deutsche Autos 1920-1945, Band (vol) 2 (in German). Motorbuch Verlag. ISBN 3-613-02170-6.
