= Opel 1,2 Liter =

Opel 1,2 Liter (1931–1935) Opel 1,0 Liter (1933) Opel P4 (1935–1937)
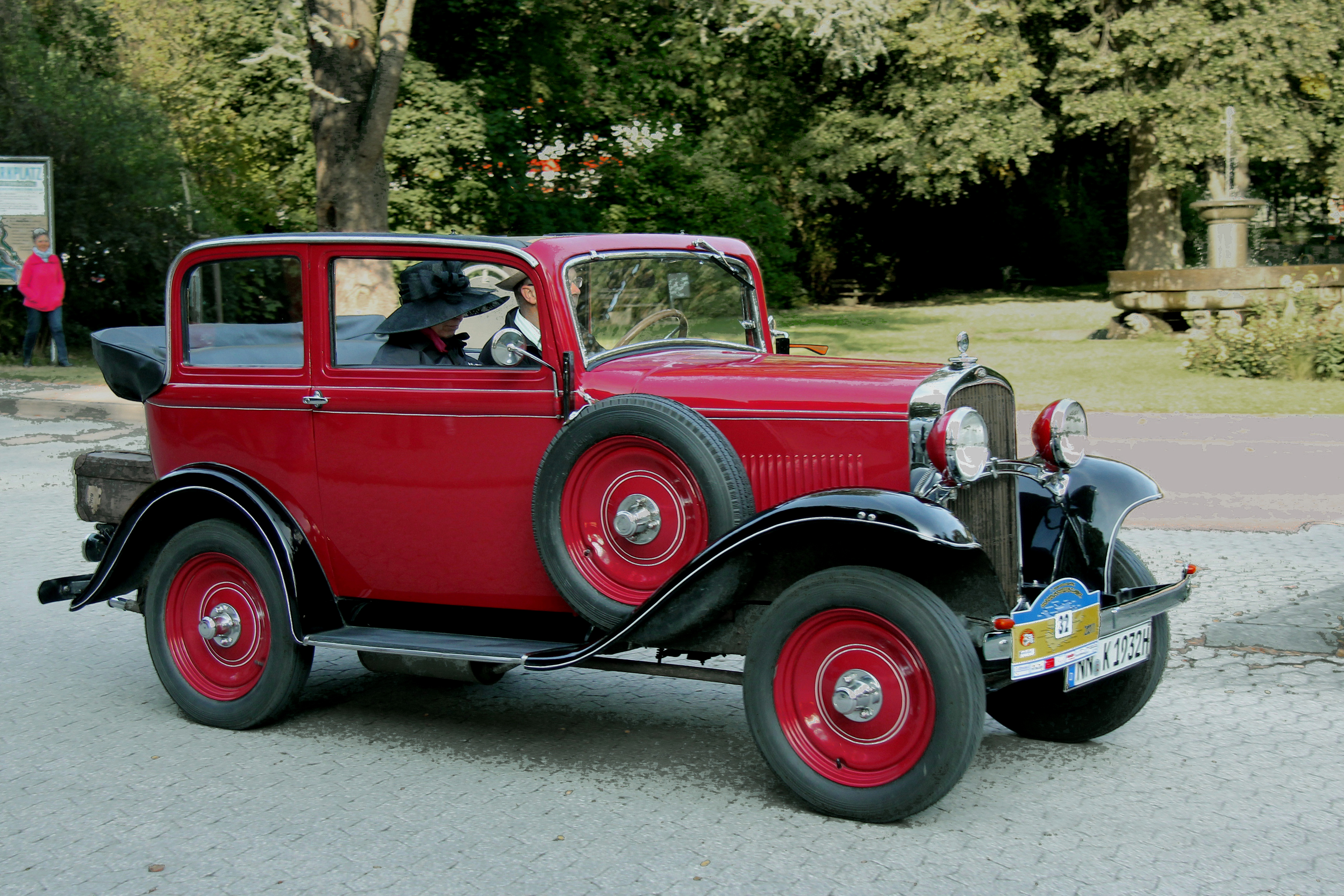
- Opel 1,2 Liter Cabrio-Limousine (1932)

Overview
- Manufacturer: Opel
- Production: Opel 1,0 Liter: 1933; Opel 1,2 Liter: 1931–1935; Opel P4: 1935–1937
- Assembly: Rüsselsheim, Germany; Tanjung Priok, Batavia, NEI (GM Java)

Body and chassis
- Body style: 2-door saloon/sedan, various 2 & 4 seater 2-door cabriolets and other inexpensive open topped configurations
- Layout: FR layout

Powertrain
- Engine: 995 cc sv I4 (1933); 1073 cc sv I4 (1935–1937); 1193 cc sv I4 (1931–1935)
- Transmission: 3-speed manual (1931–1937); 4-speed manual (1933–1937); No synchromesh

Dimensions
- Wheelbase: 2,286 mm (90.0 in)
- Length: 3,215–3,500 mm (126.6–137.8 in)
- Width: 1,425 mm (56.1 in)
- Height: 1,585–1,650 mm (62.4–65.0 in)

Chronology
- Predecessor: Opel 4/20 PS
- Successor: Opel Kadett

The Opel 1,2 Liter is a small car manufactured by Opel between 1931 and 1935. The 1,2 Liter was replaced in 1935 by the Opel P4 which was broadly similar but employed a new engine and continued in production until December 1937. For just one year, in 1933, the manufacturer also offered the Opel 1,0 Liter which was a smaller-engined version of the 1,2 Liter. The Opel 1,2 Liter replaced the last version of the Opel Laubfrosch and was itself first complemented and then effectively replaced by the more roomy Opel Kadett, which had itself already entered production in 1935.

Opel was Germany's top auto-producer throughout the 1930s. Between 1932 and 1936 this model was the manufacturer's top seller.

== Origins ==
The Opel 1,2 Liter entered production in July 1931. Conceptually and technically it closely resembled the Opel 1.8 Liter which had been launched six months earlier, with the two models even sharing identical cylinder dimensions. However, the 1.8 engine had two more cylinders than the 1.2. Control over Opel had been purchased by General Motors in 1928 and the 1,2 Liter model was developed in America, with the need for efficient inexpensive production built into the development process. The wheelbase would be considered a little short for this class of car, but there would be no arguing with the aggressive pricing strategy that Opel were able to pursue with the 1,2 Liter.

== New naming conventions ==
Opel's naming conventions had hitherto followed the normal German practice of giving each model a two number name, in which the first number represented the car's tax horsepower and the second number represented its actual (metric) horse power. The car's predecessor had thus been sold as the Opel 4/20 because its tax horsepower would have been 4 and its actual, brake horsepower 20 PS (14.7 kW; 19.7 hp). (Note: A complicating factor here is that the German Finance Office had abolished the Tax Horsepower (Steuer-PS) in 1928 and replaced it with a Tax Displacement (Steuer ccm). However, for several years thereafter, manufacturers continued to refer to tax horse-power as it was a familiar concept to buyers.) The Opel 1,2 Liter was an early example of a new naming convention whereby the car was simply named according to the engine size in liters, to one decimal point. Although Opel themselves would not always follow this convention faithfully, it was nevertheless a naming convention which became popular with auto-makers in several European countries in the ensuing decades as Tax horsepower, differently calculated in each country, became ever less relevant and less widely understood.

== The engine and running gear ==
The 1193 cc side-valve engine delivered a claimed maximum output of 22 PS (16.2 kW; 21.7 hp) which in 1933 increased marginally to 23 PS (16.9 kW; 22.7 hp). Published top speed was 85 km/h (53 mph), and in the case of the slightly heavier "Regent"-bodied version 82 km/h (51 mph). Transmission of power to the rear wheels took place via a three-speed manual gearbox without synchromesh. From 1933 a four-speed option became available, although the three-speed transmission continued to be the standard offering on the lower specification cars throughout. The brakes were controlled via a cable linkage and at this stage operated on the drive shaft.

== Moving downmarket ==
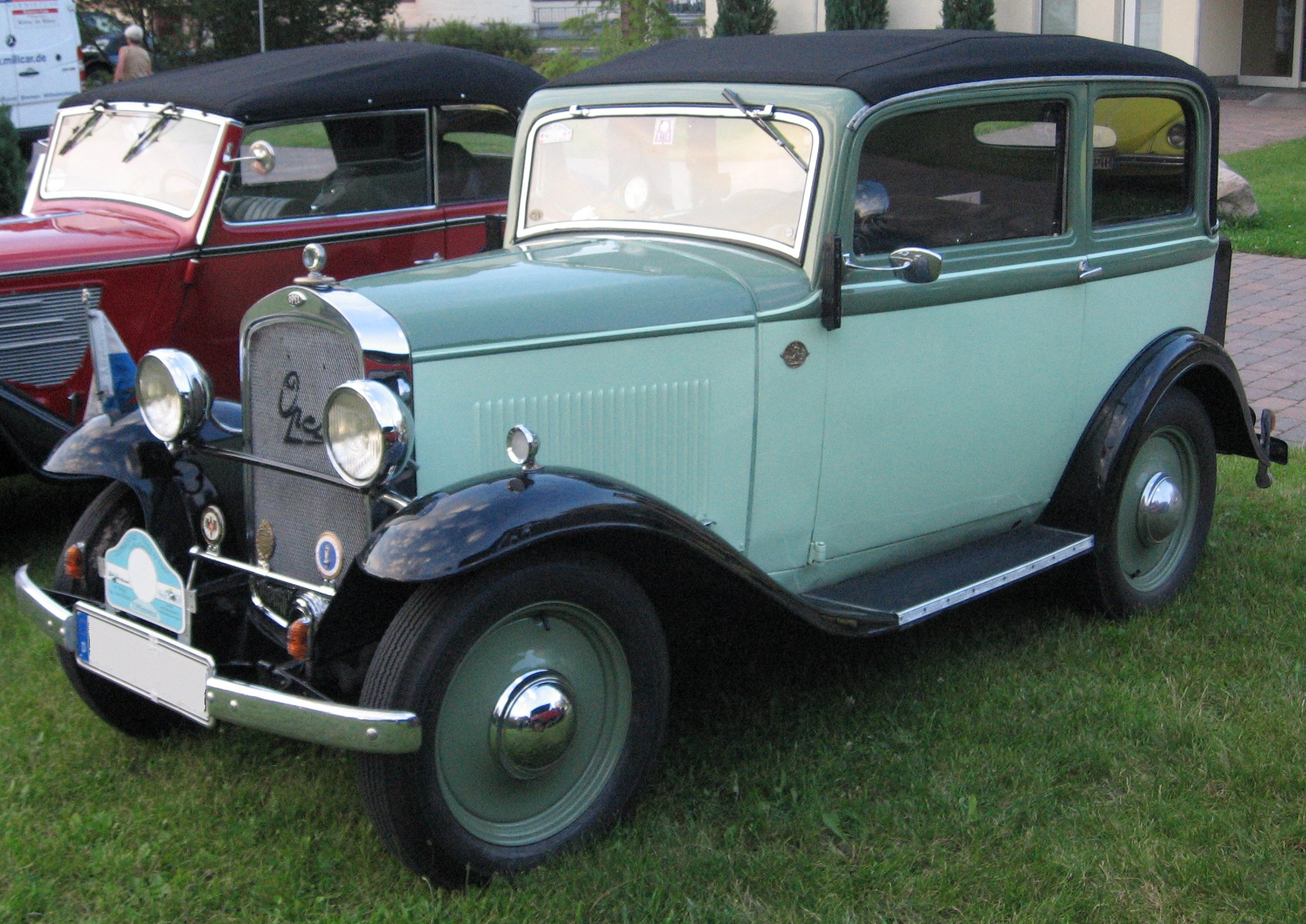
The reduced specification Opel 1,0 Liter was in production for only a year, commencing at the end of 1932.

For 1933 Opel introduced the Opel 1,0 Liter, which was a simplified version of the 1,2 Liter, powered by a 995 cc engine. Claimed maximum power for this version of the car was 18 PS (13.2 kW; 17.8 hp) and top speed was down to 78 km/h (48 mph). Production commenced in November 1932, but only one car was sold before the end of the year. However, by the time production ended after just one year in November 1933, 5600 of the reduced specification cars had been produced. Ending production of the 1,0 Liter after just one year has been attributed to the economic recovery which was finally setting in, with the total size of the German car market increasing from 41,118 cars in 1932 to 130,938 in 1934. Also relevant will have been Germany's abolition of the annual car tax for new cars purchased after 1933. This tax, which would return only in 1945, was based on engine size, and a reduced taxation level thanks to its smaller engine had been one of the key selling features of the Opel 1,0 Liter.

== A range of bodies ==
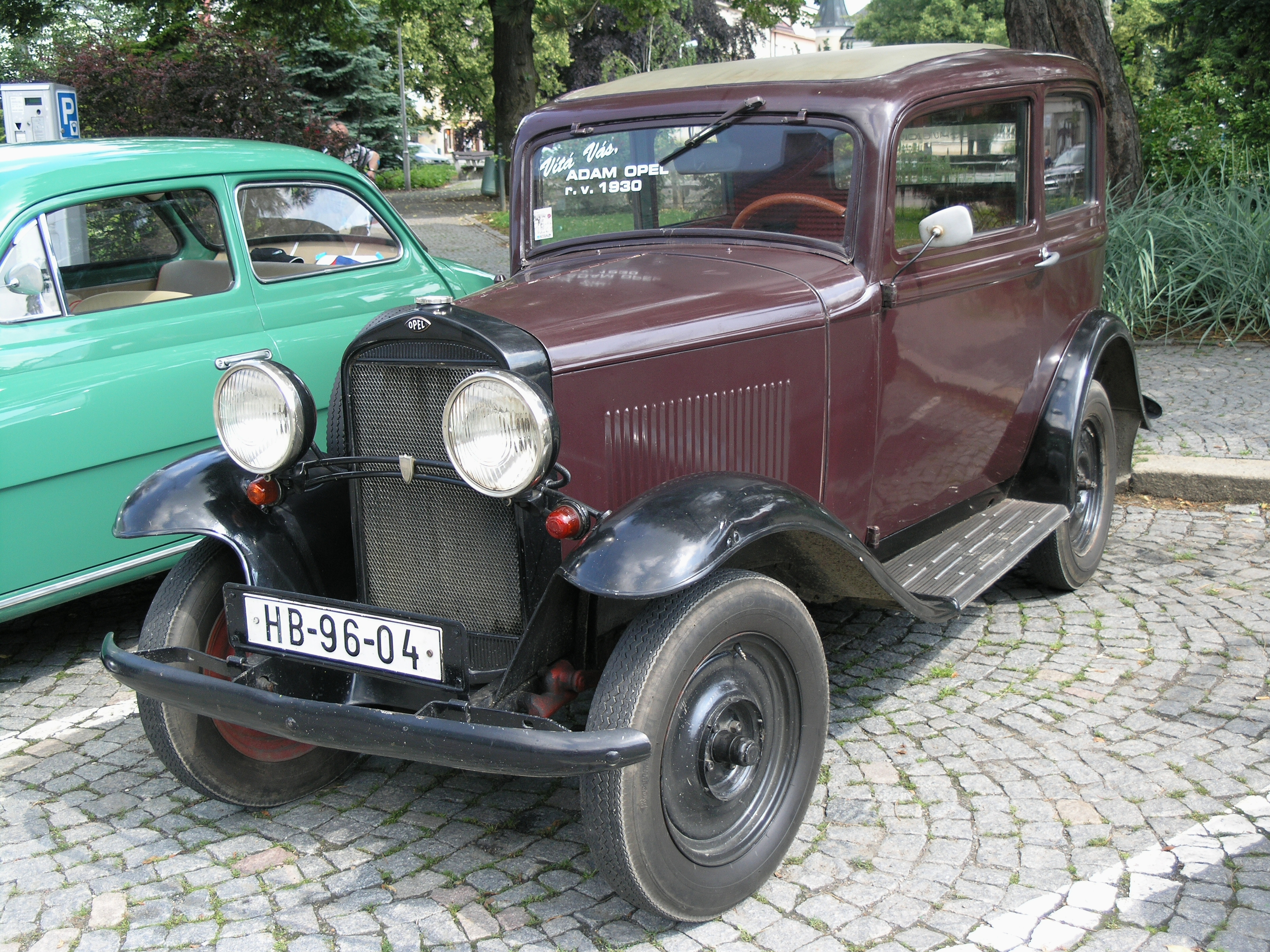
For 1934 the roofless and two seater cars were withdrawn, leaving the two door sedan/saloon as the entry level Opel 1,2

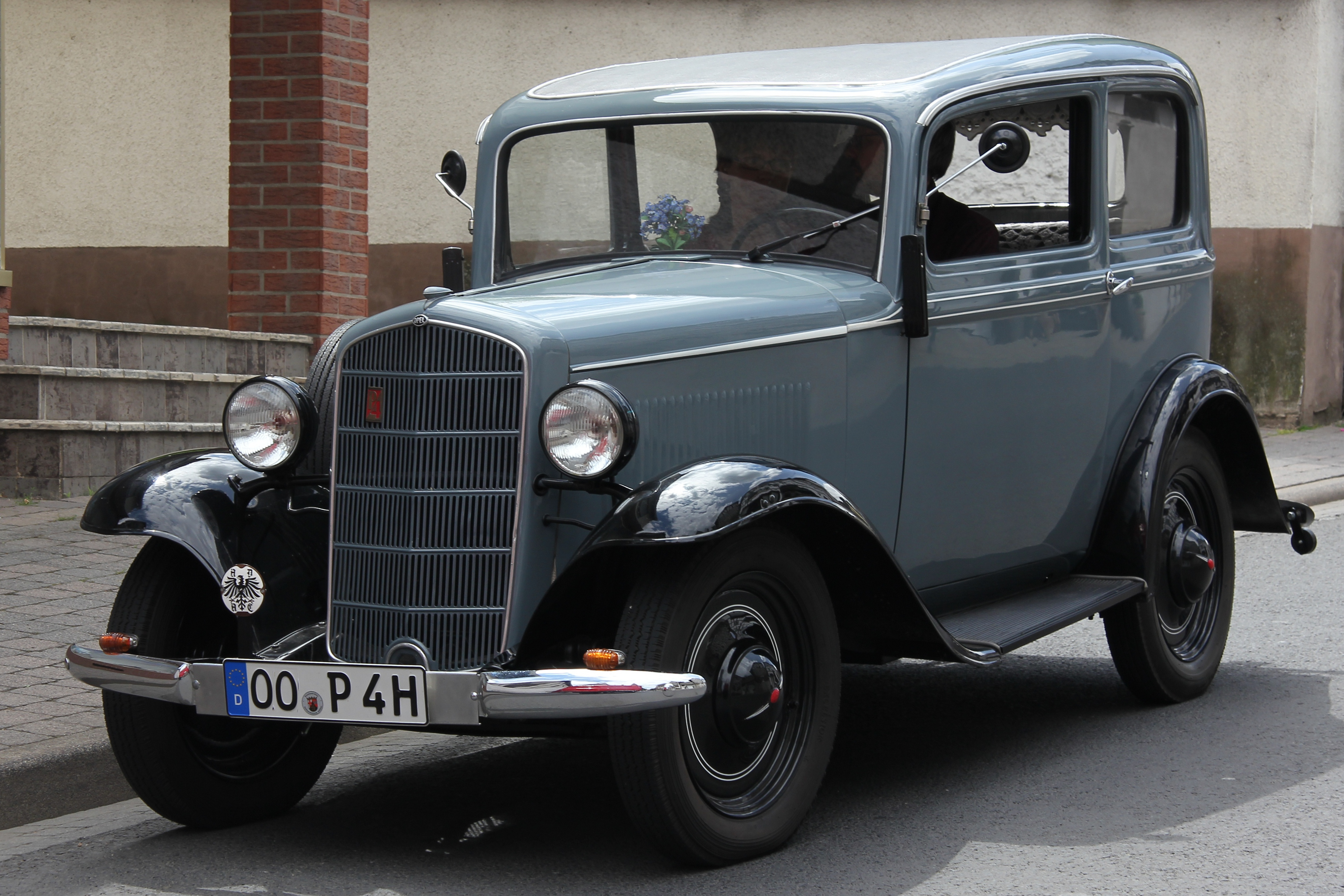
The Opel P4 replaced the Opel 1,2 in September 1935. From the outside there was little to distinguish the two models from one another, but at the front the P4 did have its radiator covered by a simple front grille.

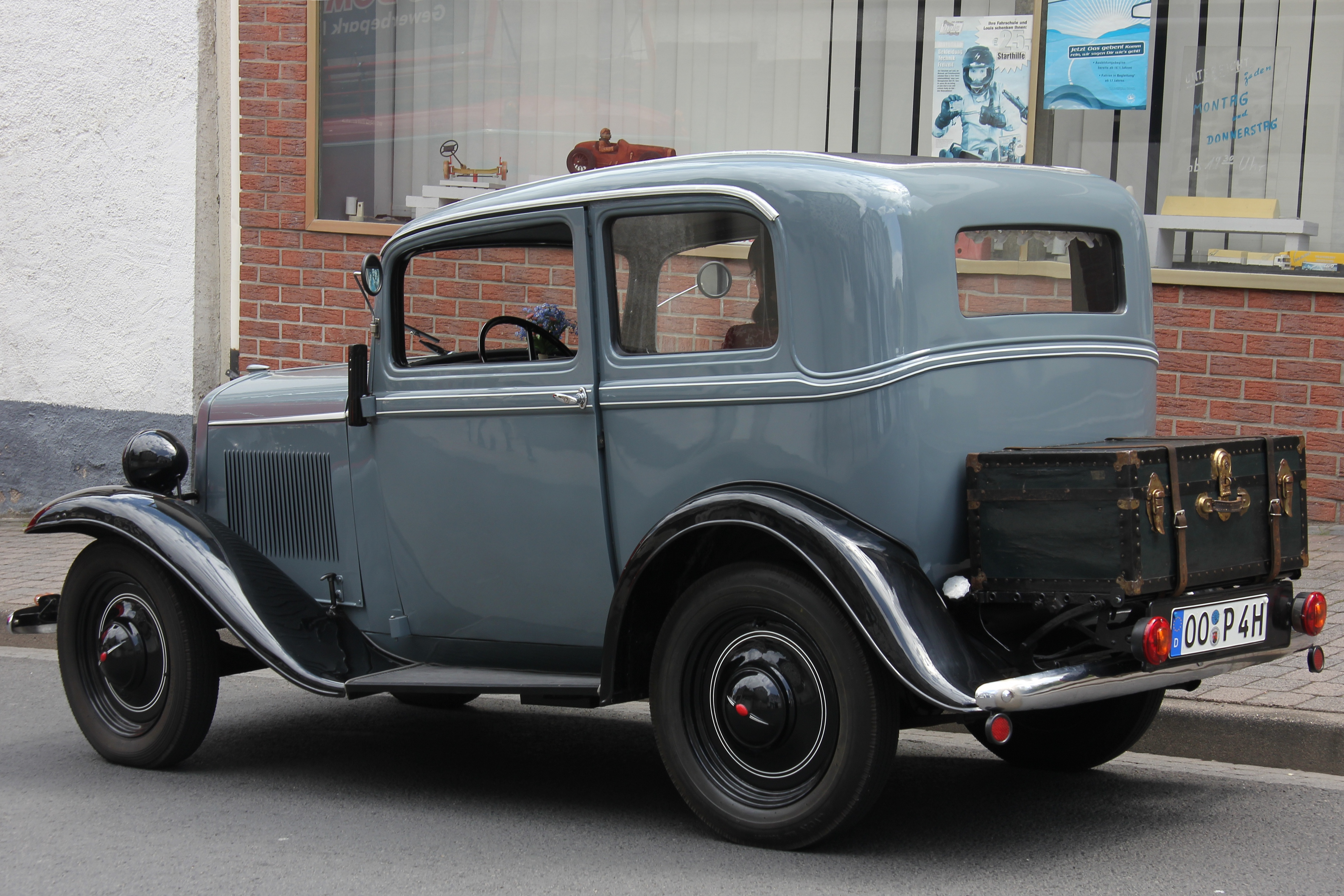
The absence of a luggage locker at the back did not necessarily enforce a complete absence of luggage.

The car was launched with the usual range of bodies. The entry-level car was the open-topped two-seater which was priced in 1931 at 2,000 Marks. With price deflation a feature of the economy at this time, it was possible in 1932 to reduce the manufacturer's listed price to 1,890 Marks. There were two and four-seater cabriolets which came with a foldaway roof-cover and there was a two-door four-seater “Limousine” (sedan/saloon) retailing for 2,700 Marks in 1931: by 1935, following a more general upgrade for the model in 1934, the price for two door four seater “Limousine” was down to 1,850 Marks, presumably helped by economies of scale resulting from the car's popularity.

Versions of the 1.2 were also assembled in the Netherlands East Indies, in Batavia (modern-day Jakarta). N.V. General Motors Java's sales territory included Indochina, Malaysia, all of modern-day Indonesia, as well as Thailand. Due to the economic downturn following the Depression, GM Java switched its production from Chevrolets to an Opel 1.2-powered 7-seater taxibus in 1932; an ambulance version was added in 1933.

== Expanding the range upmarket ==
In 1932, the 1,2 Liter "Regent" took the range upmarket. This took the two-door Limousine (saloon) body of the larger Opel 1.8 and persuaded it onto a slightly extended version of the smaller platform of the 1,2 Liter.

Four-door Limousine (saloon) bodies became available in 1933 for both 1,2 Liter models, featuring a six-light body and a lengthened, 2,445 mm (96.3 in) wheelbase. The car was nevertheless still short for a four-door design and the doors were narrow.

== 1934 range rationalisation ==
1934 saw a simplification of the range of available body types, which was now reduced to three. These were a Limousine, a Special-Limousine and a Cabrio-Limousine with a roll-back soft top and fixed frames around the doors and side windows. The removal, after just a year in production, of the four door Limousine reflected the January 1934 introduction of the slightly larger Opel 1,3 Liter which from the start came with the option of a four-door Limousine body.

== Opel P4 (1935) ==
In September 1935 the Opel P4 replaced the Opel 1,2 Liter. The body was unchanged apart from an updated front grille. Also unchanged were the wheelbase and the transmission. What was new was the engine, which was less undersquare than before, though its essential architecture as a straight-four cylinder side-valve unit was familiar enough. The claimed maximum power output and top speed were unchanged at 23 PS (17 kW; 23 hp) and 85 km/h (53 mph) respectively. What did change was the engine size, which was now reduced to 1073 cc. In view of the price reduction from 1,850 to 1,650 Marks which accompanied the change to the P4 model, and the further reduction to 1,450 Marks in 1937, it seems likely that the new power unit was cheaper to produce than the earlier powerplant.

This was also the point at which four-wheel brakes replaced the earlier braking system which had operated on the drive shaft.

Despite the unchanged performance, in the marketplace the reduced engine size would have distanced the car from the more modern Opel 1,3 Liter introduced in 1934, and from the manufacturer's important new Olympia and Kadett models which entered production in 1935 and late 1936 respectively.

== Commercial ==
Commercially the car was a success. Possibly on account of the aggressive price reduction accompanying its introduction, the P4 sold even better that the 1,2 Liter model, with 40,405 cars produced in 1936 which was the models best year, and the year in which its production volume equated 19 percent of the German passenger car market. In view of the relatively national focus of the major individual European automobile markets at this time, the overwhelming majority of Opel 1,2 Liter/P4 models will have been sold in Germany. In 1936 the Opel P4 was Germany's most popular car. The value for money that the Opel P4 offered will have been a cause for concern to supporters of the government sponsored Volkswagen programme, which was already well advanced and which was a pet project of Adolf Hitler. Production of the little Opel was in any case much reduced during 1937, the P4's last year of production, reflecting the popularity of the larger and much more modern Kadett: for the Kadett 1937 was the first full year of production.

Total production between 1931 and 1937 of the 1,2 Liter, 1,0 Liter, and P4 models combined was 173,027.

== Sources and further reading ==
- Oswald, Werner (2001). Deutsche Autos 1920-1945, Band (vol) 2 (in German). Motorbuch Verlag. ISBN 3-613-02170-6.

This entry includes information from the equivalent entry in the German Wikipedia
