= Opel Laubfrosch =

Opel 4 PS Opel Laubfrosch
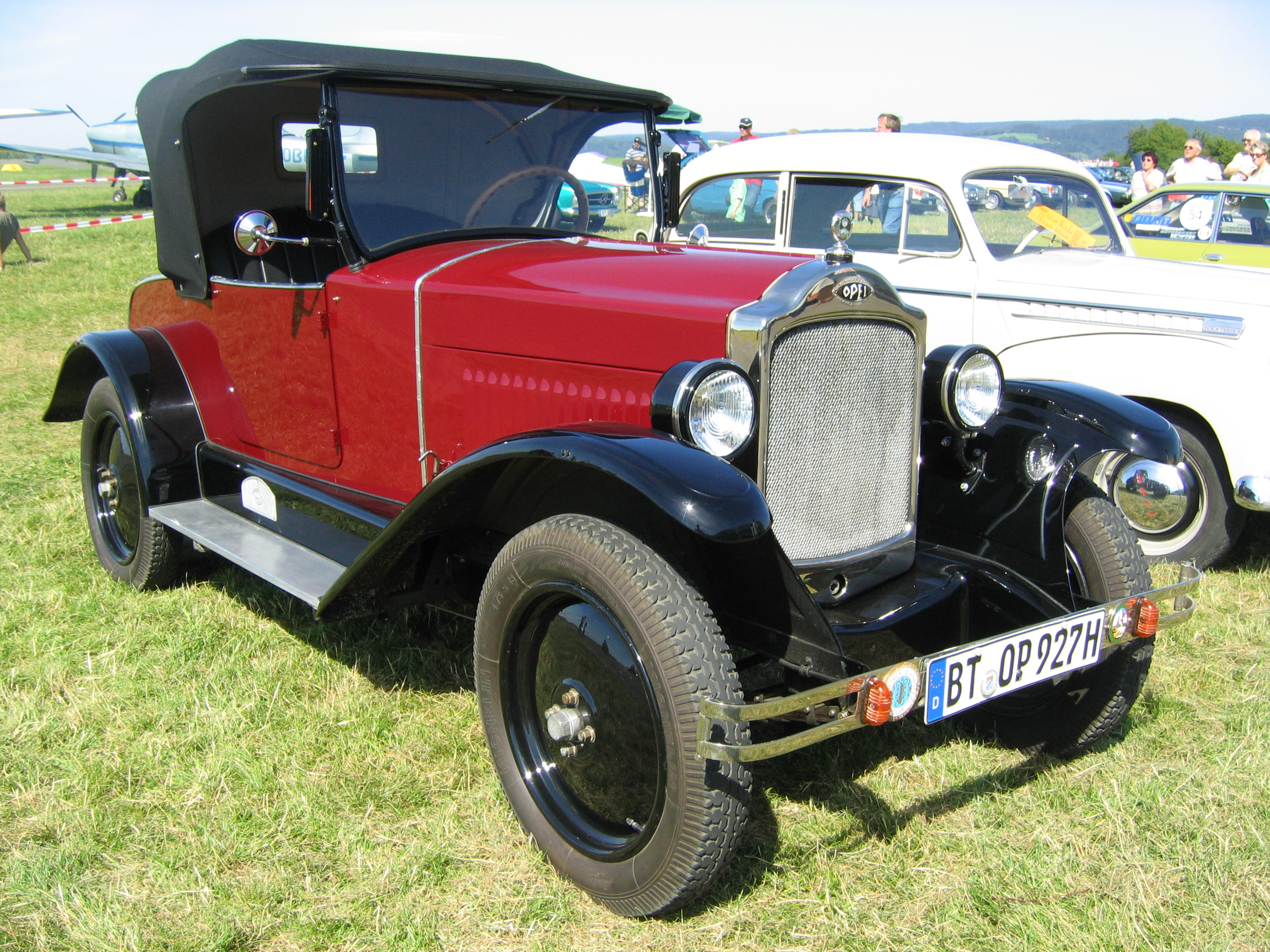

Overview
- Manufacturer: Opel
- Also called: 1924–25: Opel 4/12 PS; 1924–26: Opel 4/14 PS; 1927–28: Opel 4/16 PS; 1929–31: Opel 4/20 PS
- Production: 1924–31; 119,484 produced

Body and chassis
- Body style: 2-door Torpedo; 2-door Saloon; Delivery van

Powertrain
- Engine: 951 cc sidevalve I4 (4/12 PS); 1018 cc sidevalve I4 (4/14 PS)

Dimensions
- Wheelbase: 1924-25: 2,255 mm (88.8 in); 1924-31: 2,510 mm (99 in)

Chronology
- Successor: Opel 1,2 Liter

Opel Laubfrosch
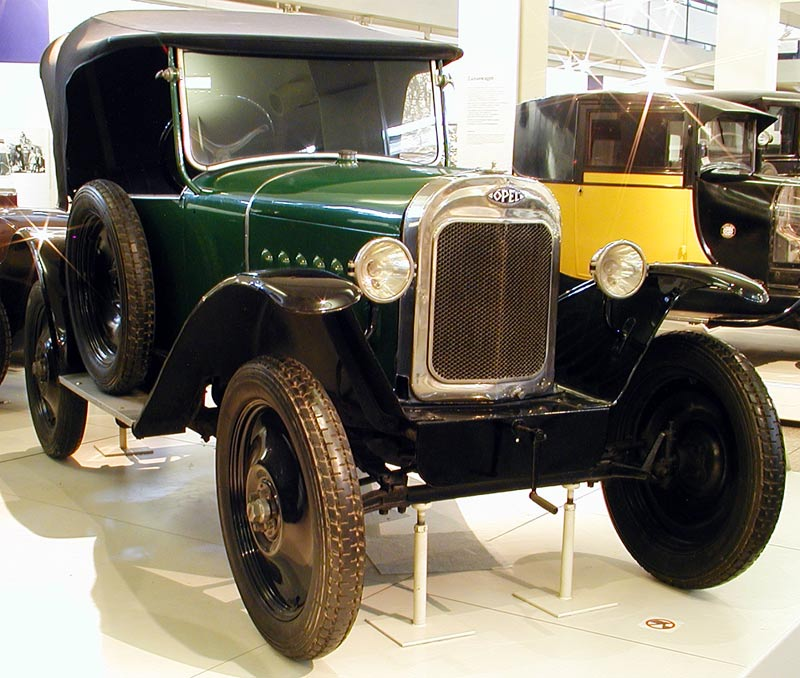
- Opel Laubfrosch featuring the pre-1928 radiator. Just visible: on these early models the fuel filler was positioned centrally ahead of the windscreen.

Opel Laubfrosch
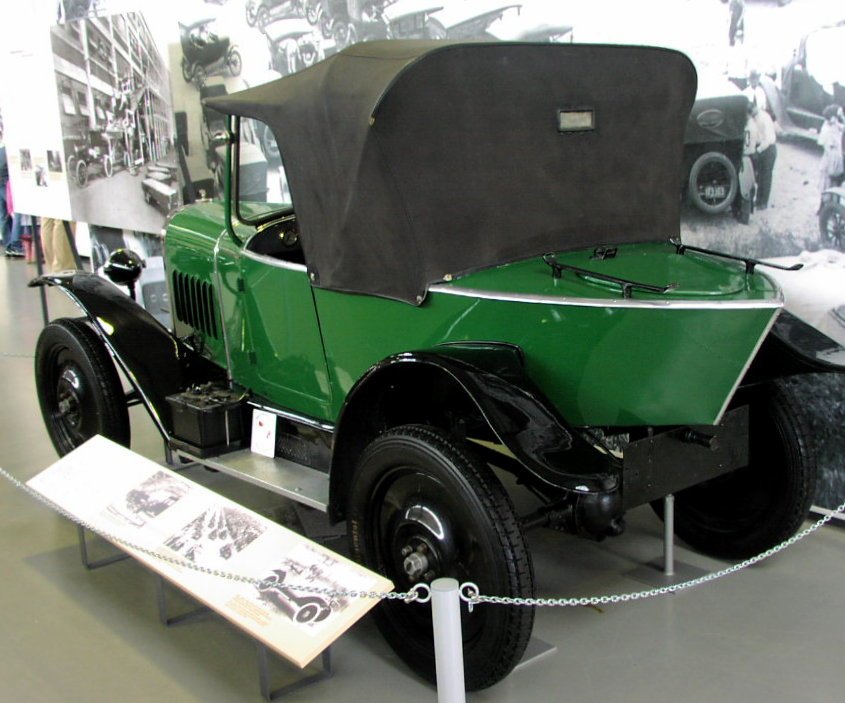
- Opel Laubfrosch: the 'boat deck' style tail on open topped models was a distinguishing feature of the Opel and of the Citroën which it flattered.

Opel Laubfrosch
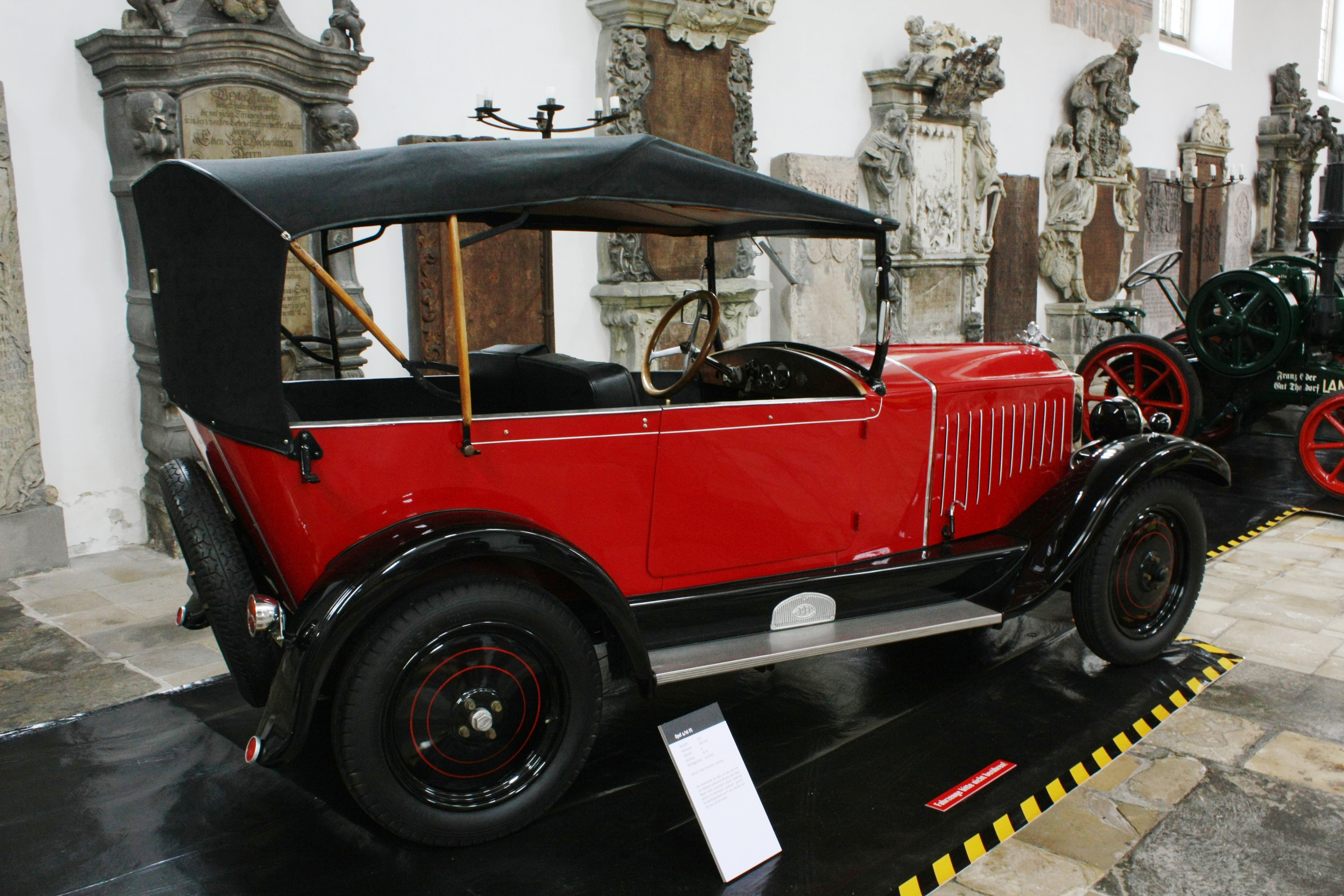
- Opel Laubfrosch open topped four seater.

The Opel 4 PS, popularly known as the Laubfrosch (treefrog), is a small two-seater car introduced by the auto maker Opel early in 1924. Subsequently, various versions of the little Laubfrosch were produced until it was replaced by the Opel 1.2 litre.

Initially introduced as the Opel 4/12 PS, and manufactured at Opel's Rüsselsheim plant, this was the first German car to be assembled on a Ford inspired production line. It was aimed at the lower end of the German auto market, and clearly intended, by the standards of the day, for volume production: it sold well, with 119,484 produced by the time Laubfrosch production ended in June 1931.

== The name ==
The official name referred to the fact that the car's engine size gave it a 4 tax horsepower (Steuer-PS) rating. Where a two figure name is used, as in 4/12, the second number is the claimed actual horsepower.

The origins of the Laubfrosch soubriquet are not entirely clear, but may refer to the fact that Opel painted all the early cars green, which by tradition is a lucky colour in Germany. Emphasis on the green colour also served to differentiate the car from the similarly shaped Citroën 5 CV which normally turned up painted yellow and was accordingly sometimes known as the Citron (lemon).

== Chronology ==
=== 1924 - 1925: Opel 4 / 12 PS ===
Series production began in May 1924. Initially only a single body type, a simple two door "cabriolet" was offered, and the cars were all green. The 4,500 Mark price was competitive and the performance, for a small inexpensive car, was good. Demand for the cars and positive publicity followed, along with the affectionate soubriquet "Laubfrosch".

The car had a four-cylinder Thermosyphon water cooled side valve engine with a claimed maximum output of 12 PS (8.8 kW) at 2,200 rpm, and a top speed of 66 km/h (41 mph). Drive passed through a three speed transmission to the rear wheels. Alarmingly from the perspective of the twenty-first century the fuel tank in the Laubfrosch was housed along with the engine under the bonnet/hood.

The footbrake operated mechanically on the drive shaft while a cable operated handbrake applied stopping power to the rear wheels. The wheelbase on these early cars was 2,255 mm (88.8 in).

The 4/12 PS was produced through 1924 and 1925, with a few modifications in place for the second year, including a new fashionable "boat-deck" style rear end and a switch over in respect of the brakes so that in 1925 it was the footbrake pedal that operated via a cable linkage on the rear wheels and the hand brake that operated via a mechanical linkage directly on the drive shaft.

=== 1924 - 1926: Opel 4 / 14 PS ===
In Autumn 1924, some months after the launch of the 4 / 12 PS, Opel introduced the 4 / 14 with a slightly longer wheelbase, a larger engine, and a wider range of bodies.

The engine architecture and the stroke length in the cylinders was unchanged, but the bore was increased by 2 mm (0.079 in), giving an engine capacity increased to 1018 cc and maximum output to 14 PS (10.3 kW) at 2,500 rpm. The listed top speed was unchanged but the wheelbase was increased by 355 mm (14.0 in) to 2,510 mm (99 in) and new larger bodies became available. Another claim made for the 4 / 14 PS was that it incorporated improved brakes.

Three seater bodies were offered, the third seat positioned behind the front two, and the bodywork a choice between an enclosed "Limousine" sedan/saloon and an open topped body. From 1925 the 2,510 mm (98.8 in) wheelbase cars were available with two and, for the first time on a Laubfrosch, four-seater bodies. There was now also a small delivery van. The cars were no longer only available in green. The three-seater "Limousine"-bodied cars were delivered in Steel Grey with a black roof while the delivery van variants were Reddish Brown".

=== 1927 - 1928: Opel 4 / 16 PS ===
Improvements announced in November 1926 included more power for the 1018 cc engine which by now was standard across the Laubfrosch range. Maximum output of 16 PS (11.8 kW) at 2,800 rpm came with a small increase in the compression ratio and a change in the carburetor specification. Claimed top speed rose to 70 km/h (44 mph). There was also an increase in the range of body types offered along with some minor styling changes.

For the first time the footbrake operated, still using a cable linkage, on all four wheels, and the suspension system was also reworked. The steering wheel was moved from the right side to the left, reflecting a more general trend in Europe at the time. The fuel filler cap which till now had been positioned centrally between the back of the hood/bonnet and the base of the windscreen was now repositioned under the bonnet/hood.

In Autumn 1927 ratios on first and second gear were modified and the car received a slightly more flamboyant "Packard" style radiator.

=== 1929 - 1931: Opel 4 / 20 PS ===
At the end of 1928 the claimed maximum power from the engine increased to 20 PS (14.7 kW) at 3,500 rpm which pushed the listed top speed up to 77 km/h (48 mph). This was accompanied by a further change in the carburetor specification. Three-seater bodies had by now disappeared from the list, but a new 2+2 cabriolet was introduced in 1930. The delivery van (Lieferwagen) had a top speed of 75 km/h (47 mph).

The naming convention by which the Laubfrosch had been known as the Opel 4 PS became in one respect obsolete in 1928, since it defined the car in terms of its tax horsepower (Steuer-PS). 1928 was the year in which the German finance office switched from levying annual tax according to "tax horsepower", taxing cars instead according to "Steuer-cm^{3}" (tax cubic capacity). Many German cars continued to be named formally or informally according to tax horsepower through the early 1930s, but already in 1931 the Laubfrosch was sometimes known simply as the Opel 1.1, reflecting its engine size in litres rounded up to the nearest 100 cc, and following the naming convention which Opel adopted across their range in 1931.

Year	1929	1930	1931	Units
4/20	20,657	18,939	3,192	42,788

== Commercial ==
The 4 PS ushered in Germany's age of mass motorisation, and was attractively priced on launch at RM 4,500. By 1930 Opel had produced 100,000 of these cars: initial investment costs had presumably by now been amortized, since the selling price had come down to 1,990 ℛ︁ℳ︁. This was a deflationary period for the major European economies, but even in real money terms, the Laubfrosch became substantially cheaper during its production run. Germany's first mass-produced car could be priced to sell in the volumes that had, by 1930, established Opel, as Germany's leading volume auto producer. It is almost certainly because of the car's success and the state of the art production facilities at Rüsselsheim that in 1929 General Motors purchased an 80% holding (subsequently increased to 100%) in the Opel family's auto business.

== Alleged plagiarism ==
Opel's Rüsselsheim plant may have contained the first automobile production line assembly system in Germany, but the first automobile production line in Europe had been created by André Citroën who had initially adopted Henry Ford's system for the production of munitions, and subsequently applied the technique to production of the Citroën Type A. It was not merely the production system that Opel took from Citroën. The two-seater Opel 4 PS when launched in 1924 bore an uncanny resemblance to the little Torpedo bodied Citroën 5 CV which had been launched in 1921. Sources differ as to whether Opel purchased the right to assemble the Citroën under licence, or merely copied the design.

There were differences. The Opel's wheelbase was longer by 5 mm and the look of its radiator was different. The early Opels were mostly green whereas the early Citroëns were mostly yellow. Under the skin, the Opel had a twelve-volt electrical system at a time when most cars (including the Citroën 5 CV) used a six-volt system. And the Opel's four-cylinder water-cooled engine size was larger, at 951 cc, than the Citroën's 856 cc. André Citroën nonetheless felt justified in launching a legal action against Opel, and it is not immediately clear just how Opel successfully defended their position.

== Sources ==
- Oswald, Werner (2001). Deutsche Autos 1920-1945, Band (vol) 2 (in German). Motorbuch Verlag. ISBN 3-613-02170-6.
