= Citroën Type C 5HP =

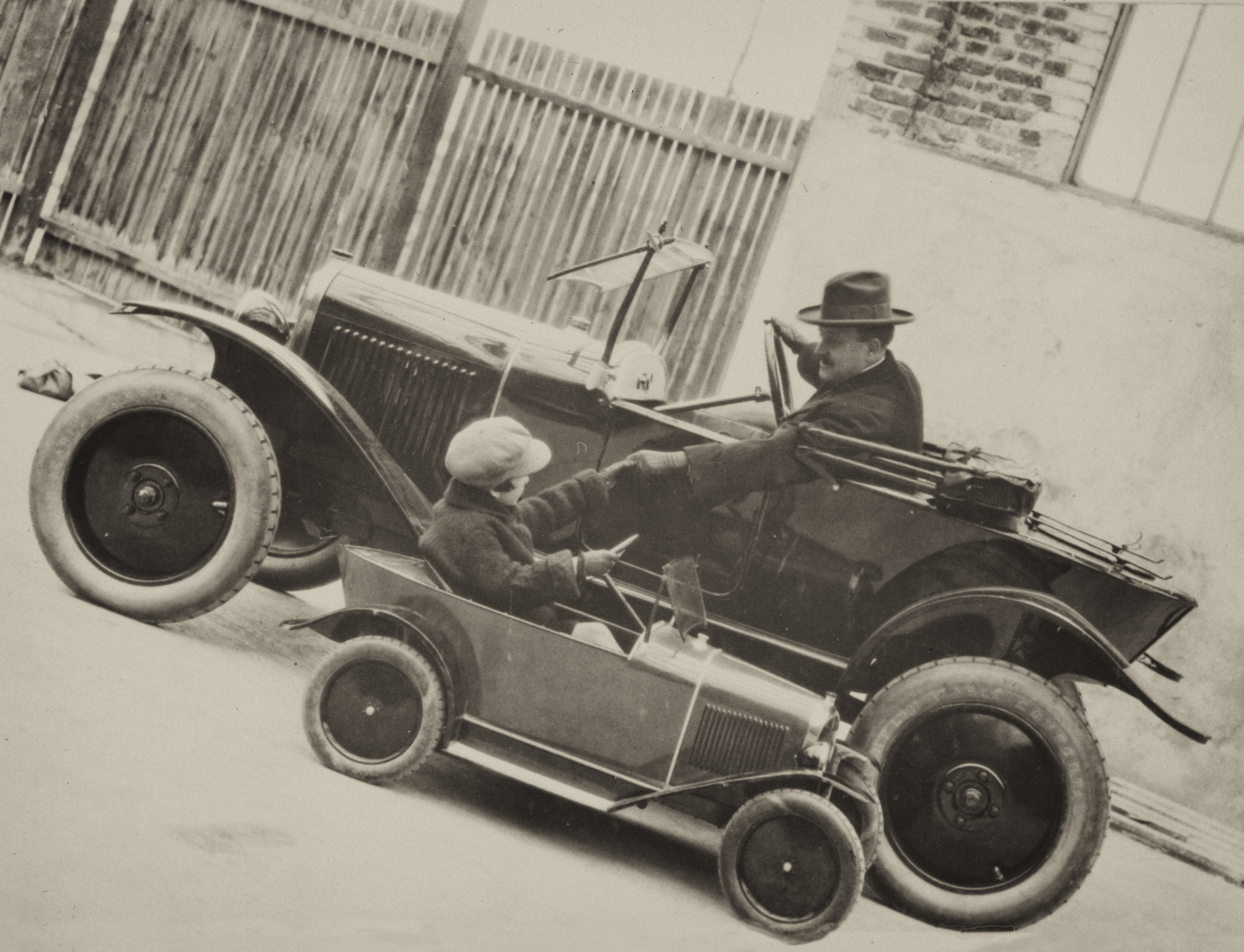
- 5HP Torpedo T2 & Citroënette

Overview
- Manufacturer: Citroën
- Production: 1922–26. 83,000 made
- Designer: Edmond Moyet

Body and chassis
- Body style: Torpedo & Cabriolet
- Layout: FR layout

Powertrain
- Engine: Petrol: 800 cc Straight-4
- Transmission: 3-speed manual

Dimensions
- Wheelbase: 2.25 metres (88.6 in) (C2) 2.35 metres (92.5 in) (C3)
- Length: 3.20 metres (126.0 in)
- Width: 1.40 metres (55.1 in)
- Curb weight: 543 kg (1,197 lb)

The Citroën Type C was a light car made by the French Citroën car company between 1922 and 1926 with almost 81,000 units being made. Known as Citroën 5HP or 5CV in France and 7.5HP in Britain, it was the second model of automobile designed and marketed by André Citroën, between 1922 and 1926. It followed the 10HP "Type A " (1919), then 10HP "B2" (1921); they were the first European mass-produced cars.

The first colour in which it was made was a pale "grapefruit" yellow which earned it the first nickname "petite citron" (little lemon). It was also nicknamed "Cul de poule" (hen's bottom) or "boat tail" due to the rear of the little car's body and also "Trefle" (clover leaf) referring to the shape of the three-seat version.

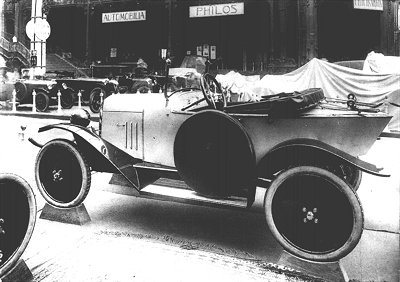
Oct.1921 Paris Motor Show

== History ==
The genesis of the Type C took place in the immediate post-war period, when the whole of Europe was in a disastrous state, especially economically, with relentless inflation reducing the value of savings and investments of all kinds.

Only those industrialists with a particularly modern approach to production could hope to weather the financial crisis with a minimum of damage.

The first of these in Europe was André Citroën, a fervent admirer of Henry Ford's methods of mass production, especially after his visit to Detroit in 1912.

He had been able to put these methods into practice during the war in his ammunition factory where he had achieved remarkable levels of production (50,000 shells per day).

By the end of the war, Citroën had a fully equipped factory, which he decided to use for mass production of vehicles as Henry Ford had done with his famous Model T since 1908.

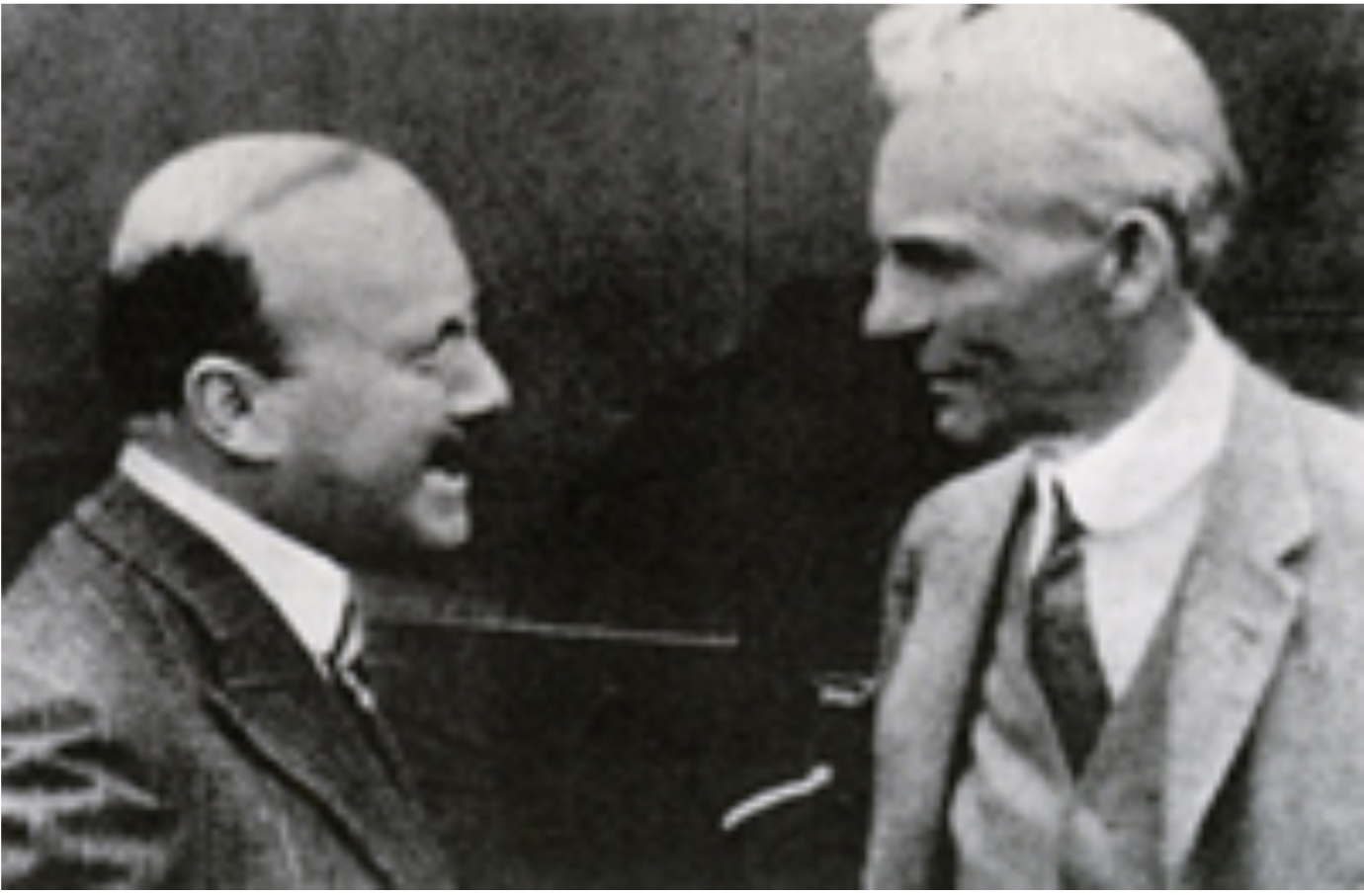
Andre Citroën & Henry Ford – Jun. 1923.

While the French government encouraged, by means of tax benefits, car manufacturers to invest in cyclecars (maximum weight: 350 kg), André Citroën preferred to enter the small car sector, then monopolized by Peugeot and Renault.

Despite its resemblance to the Type A designed by Jules Salomon, the 5HP was above all the work of the engineer Edmond Moyet who, like Jules Salomon, arrived at the Quai de Javel from "le Zèbre", after a significant experience in the field of popular cars; a few months earlier, he had designed a very similar vehicle for Amilcar: the "CC"

The result of this project was presented for the first time at the Motor Show in November 1921 as the Type C, although orders and first deliveries of the car were not received until spring 1922. It was a small car offered only with a two-seater Torpedo body, with a length of only 3.2 metres and a wheelbase of 2.25 metres (short chassis).

The lines were elegant, despite the small size of the body. The front had one of the most handsome radiator masks and the rear bodywork had a tapered boat deck shape.

The 5HP was a popular car, intended to enter the market segment below the 10 HP Type A. It was "delivered complete, without extra charge, with electric starting and lighting, five tyred wheels and a rear axle with differential".

The selling price of the 5HP Torpedo in 1922 (8500 FR) was about 60% of that of the 10 HP B2 (13900 FR) and was also much lower than its main competitor, the Peugeot Quadrilette (10000 FR) which was only a cycle car.

Although an engineer by training, André Citroën was above all in search of new ideas to assimilate and exploit. Thus he founded a consumer credit company, allowing customers to buy cars on credit, a new method for the time.

Citroën also invented the spare parts manual, the repair instructions manual, detailed repair rates and the standard exchange system for mechanical parts refurbished at the factory.

The genius of André Citroën was to promote this car to a female audience, which was very unusual at the time. All the 5HP advertising documents represented the car driven by a young woman.

After a slow start in 1922, the 5HP was so successful that by 1924 it accounted for half of Citroën's sales: nearly 30,000 vehicles per year and became the leading popular European car. The initial commercial name: 5HP became 5CV in 1925 on the occasion of the change of calculation of the power of engines: from HP (Horse Power) to CV (Cheval Vapeur).

Louis Renault is said to have described the 5HP as "the car that kept him from falling asleep".

Pierre Dumont in "Quai de Javel, Quai Andre Citroen", (1976) wrote: " The 5 CV Citroën ran at 60 km/h, a speed it seemed to be able to maintain indefinitely, and it was incredibly robust. It was a great success, as much because of its qualities, its elegance, especially as a cabriolet, as its price".

Between 1919 and 1925, Citroen set up a network of five thousand agents throughout the world, and subsidiaries and exclusive dealerships were established in Japan, the Netherlands, Switzerland, Denmark, North Africa, Australia, South America, etc. Factories were built in Spain, Italy, Poland, Algeria, Belgium, and England from 1925 in order to avoid customs taxes on imported products (such as Mac Kenna taxes in England).

Launched in May 1922, the "Torpedo" (tourer), was a two-seat version, which in 1923, became available in a more luxurious "Cabriolet" (convertible) version. In 1924, a three-seater version of the "Torpedo" and a van were added.

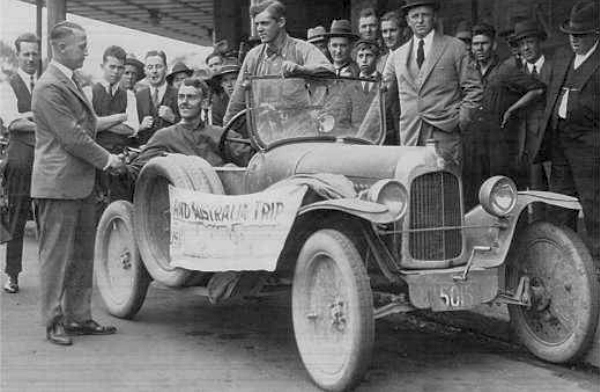
"Bubsy" arriving at Sydney – Dec. 1925.

The 5HP was a model of reliability and frugality compared to the competition; it was extremely robust evidenced by the journey of 17000 km in 5 months around Australia in 1925 of Bubsy, a "used" Torpedo with two students on board: in extreme conditions without any engine problem.

Unfortunately, although the 5HP was a success, it was insufficiently profitable, and in order to prepare for the introduction of the "all steel" B14, André Citroën personally took the decision, against general opinion, to end its production in May 1926.

A C4 "all steel" version was envisaged but was abandoned because of excessive cost. Today, the 5HP is the typical 20s vintage car. Its success is due to the fact that it was already an immense commercial success in its time and also that it is possible to rebuild it very easily from period parts and re-fabrications.

Of the 81000 5HP built, many have been converted into utility vehicles, tractors, etc. It is estimated that about 3000 (4%) survived.

== Technical ==
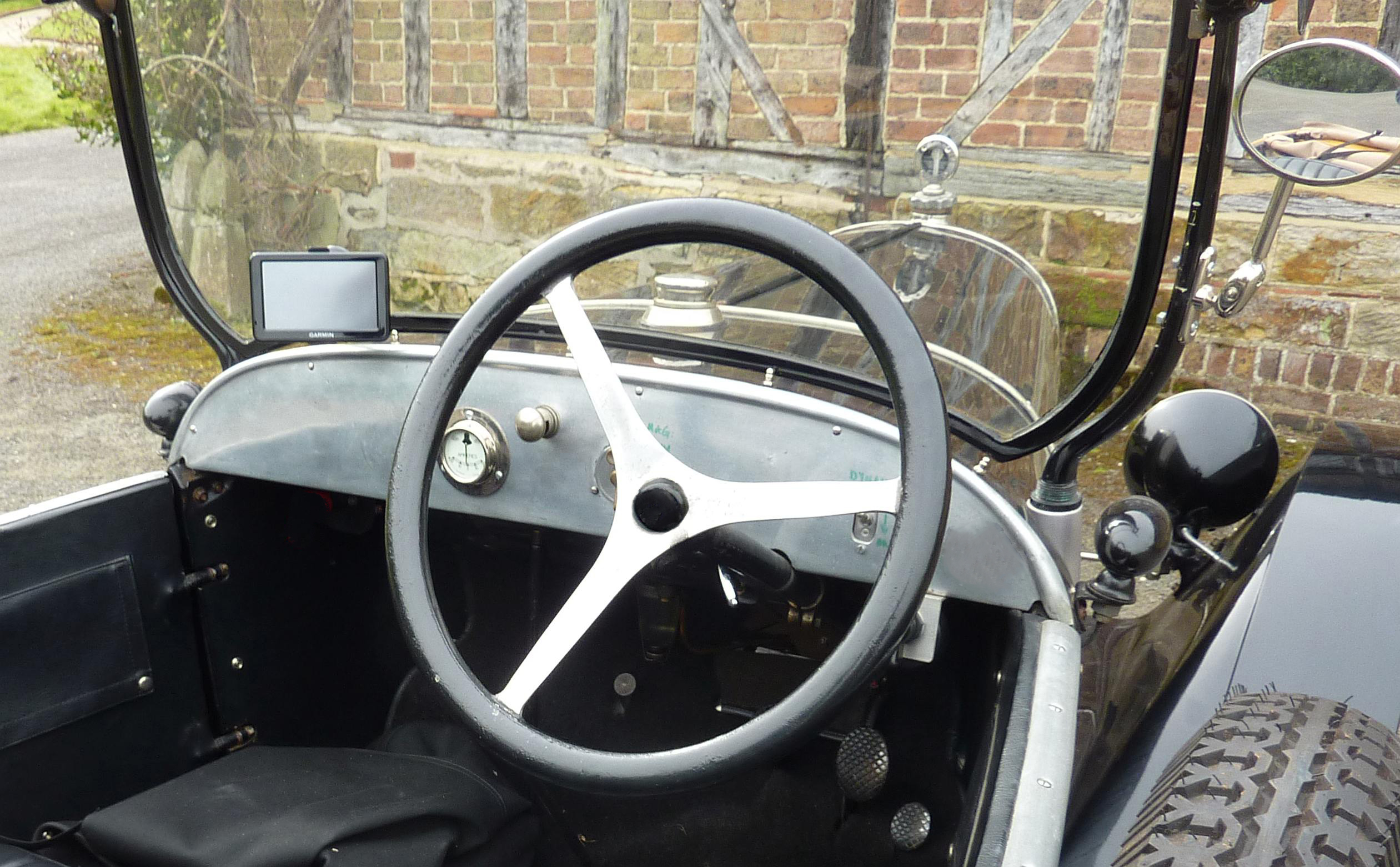
Controls on Torpedo T2 1922

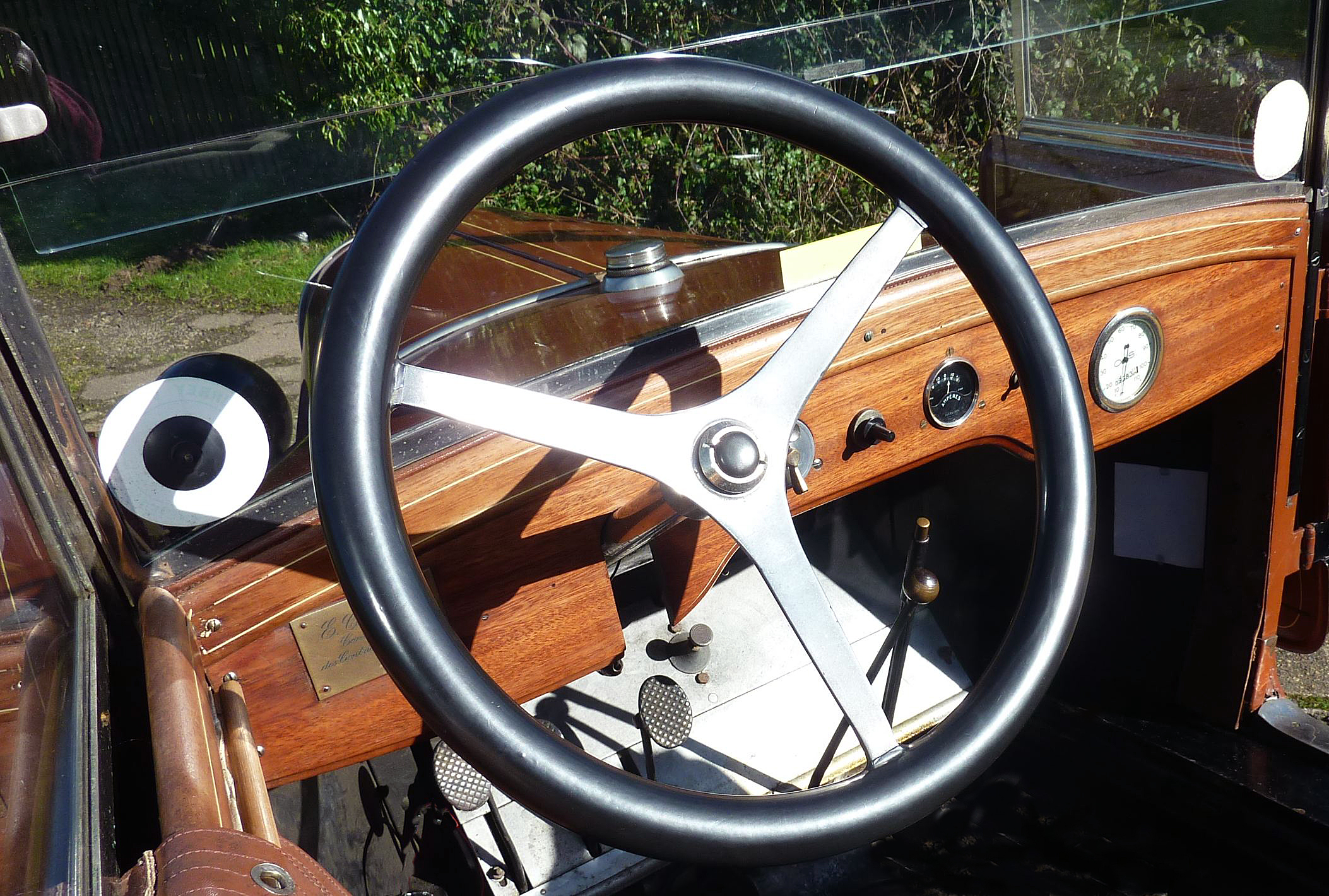
... and on Cabriolet C3

The little Citroën was ahead of the competition: it was equipped with a differential and an electric starter, allowing the car to be advertised as especially suitable for lady drivers sensitive to ease of driving. The weight of 543 kg (1,197 lb) is essentially that of the engine, gearbox, and rear axle. The maximum speed was 60 km/h (37 mph) with a fuel consumption of 5 L/100 km (56 mpg_{‑imp}; 47 mpg_{‑US}).

The 5HP chassis were assembled in the Levallois factory (Paris suburbs), and the assembly of the car was in the Javel factory; Right-hand drive versions were available for the French market (there was still a demand for this) and for export (England, Commonwealth, Sweden, Argentina, Australia).

The body was of a wooden structure, on which the body panels were nailed. It was the last Citroen with a wooden body. The car had only one door, on the passenger side, it opened forwards. The hinges were invisible (except for the "Cabriolet") and the vibrations were absorbed by a double cone lock avoiding accidental opening of the doors.

Early vehicles had a bonnet with 3 air vents that was quickly followed by a 16 air vents version. In 1922, for technical reasons, the radiator was separated into a cooling element and a nickel-plated outer casing. Initially the first Citroën badge on the radiator was blue chevrons on a nickel-plated base; later the colours were swapped.

The four-cylinder, 856 cc (52.2 cu in) engine had a bore of 55 mm (2.2 in) and stroke of 90 mm (3.5 in), generating an output of 8.2 kW (11 bhp) and was cooled by thermosiphon. From June 1, 1925, the cooling system was improved on all models by a fan ( previously fitted only to the Cabriolet ).

There was a single Solex carburettor. The original battery, coil and distributor ignition was replaced after only six months by a magneto ignition due to insufficient reliability.

The gearbox had three unsynchronized ratios plus a reverse gear; the straight-sized sprocket tended to "sing" especially in 1st and 2nd gear (not in 3rd, direct drive), and became noisy when the gears were worn or when the bush between the primary and secondary shaft was loose. This excessive play caused the primary train to become misaligned from the second train.

As on contemporary cars of the time, the accelerator pedal was located centrally between those of the clutch and the brake.

There was no braking on the front wheels but braking on the transmission was controlled by the foot brake and on the rear wheels by a hand brake lever. Braking was not the strong point of the car; it was necessary to anticipate and balance the action of the two braking systems at the risk of breaking a rear wheel shaft. Many 5HP have been modified to couple the transmission brake and the rear brakes.

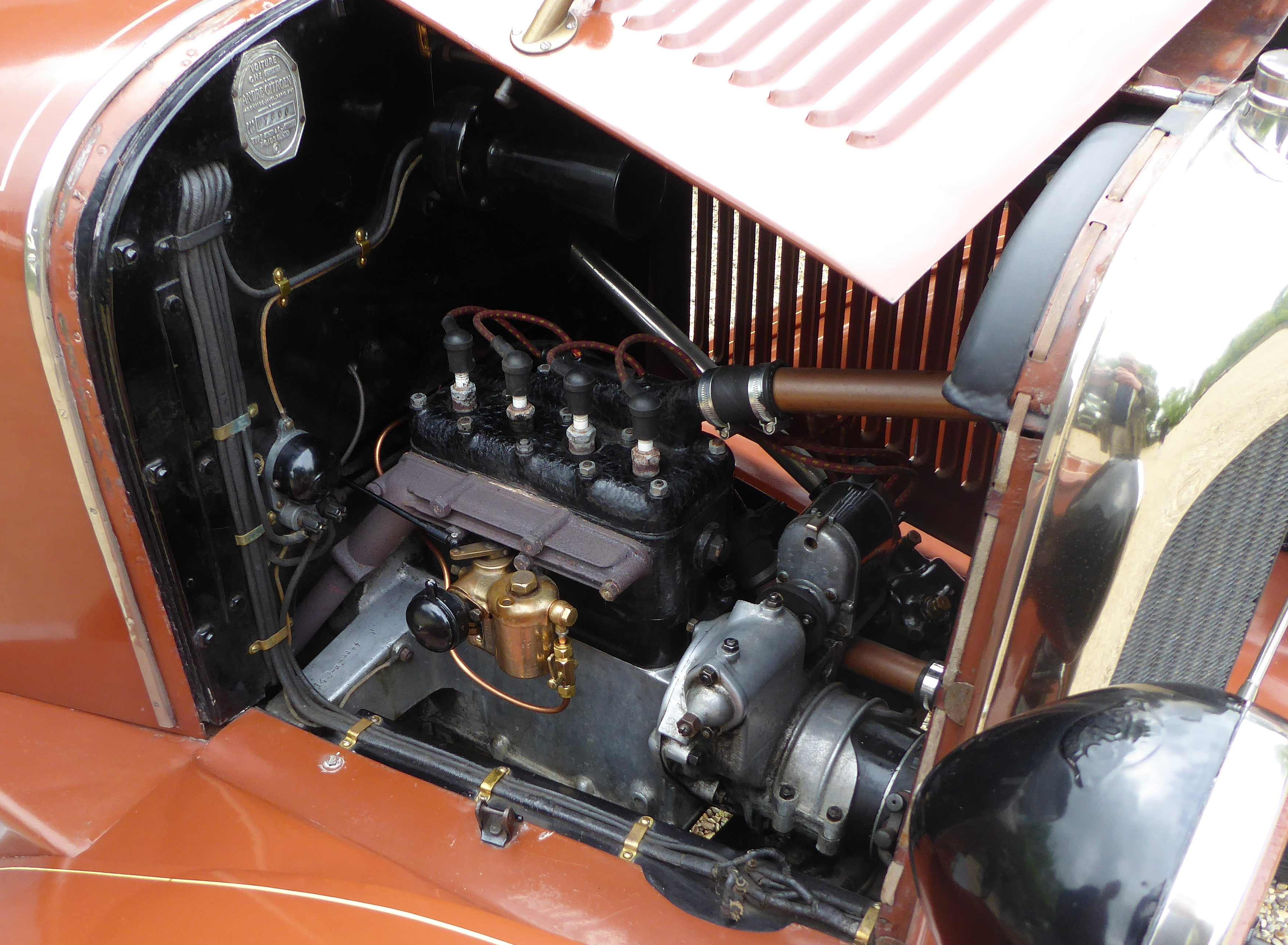
5HP engine with Solex carburetter

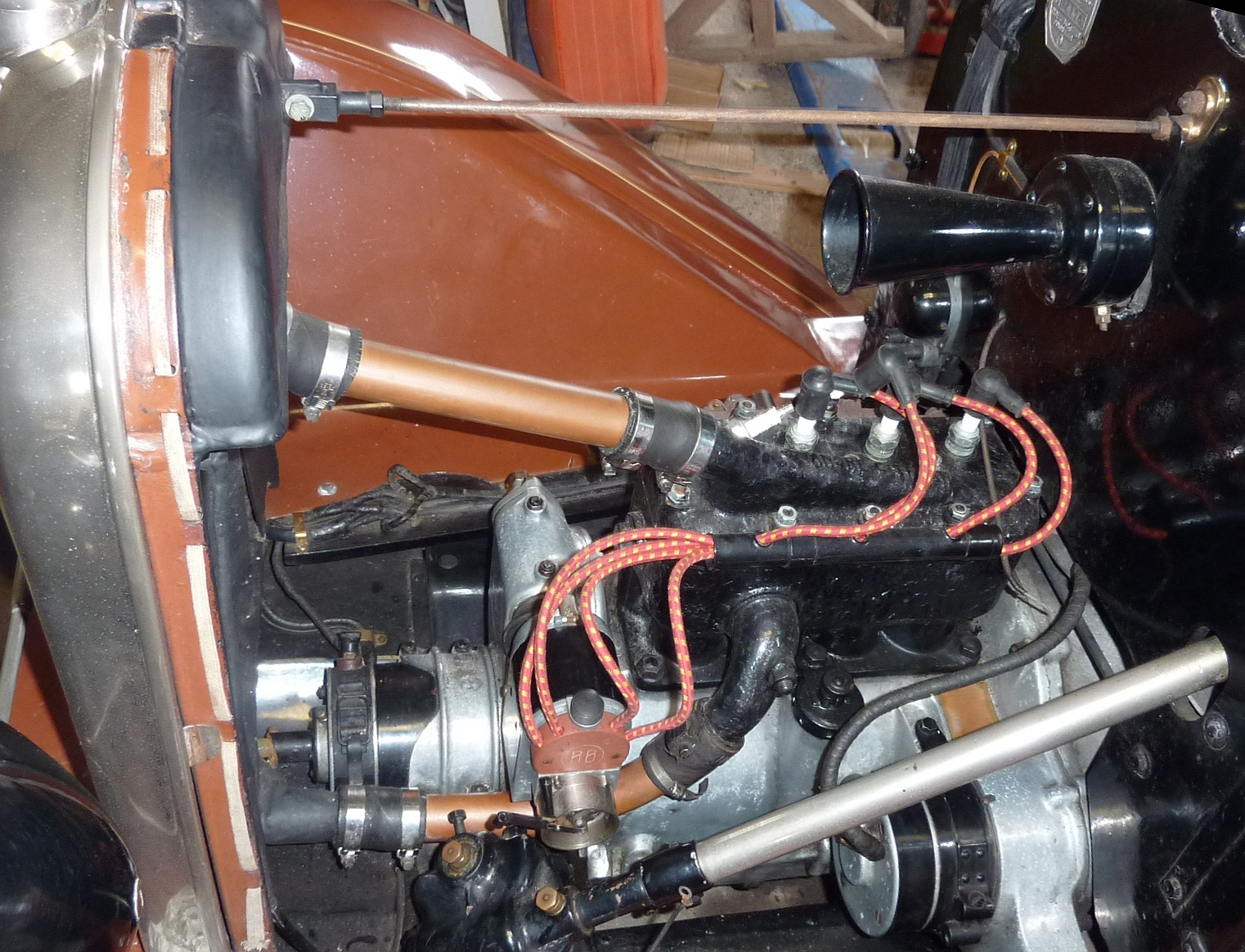
Engine with RB magneto

To avoid distortion of the U-shaped side members, the ladder frame was trapezoidal and reinforced by cross beams.

The suspension consisted of four inverted quarter-elliptical leaf springs. Friction dampers became fitted at the rear from 1925 on the heavier "Cabriolet".

At the end of 1923, the short chassis Type C.2 was lengthened by 100 mm from 2,250 mm (89 in) to 2,350 mm (93 in) and re-inforced by an additional crossbar which protruded from the rear deck and supported the rear of the body. This became the long-wheelbase chassis Type C.3. The extension of the bodywork had become necessary to allow the construction of the new "three-seat" version of the "Torpedo" as well as the "Voiture de Livraison" (delivery car). The lengthening can be noted by the long distance between the spare wheel and the rear wing. This chassis was produced without modification until the end of production.

The rear axle was of the "banjo" type with a round, then oblong (oval) shape. The teeth of the rear axle pinion were of the "Citroën chevron" type. A helical-cut, easier to produce, and more robust part became available, as replacement parts, in 1928.

Initially, the 700x80 beaded edge Michelin "Cablé" tyres were inflated at a "high pressure", 400 to 500 kPa; 58 to 73 psi (4 to 5 bar), hence mediocre road holding and comfort. They were replaced in June 1924 by 715x115 beaded edge Michelin "Cablé Confort" (balloon ) tyres inflated at a lower pressure 250 kPa; 36 psi (2.5 bar), initially offered as extra equipment, and then fitted on all cars in June. 11-12x45 wired on rims appeared in 1927 with " Confort Bibendum " tyres, low pressure 150 to 175 kPa; 21.8 to 25.4 psi (1.5 to 1.75 bar) and were fitted as replacement of the original beaded edge rims.

The equipment level of the 5 HP being relatively basic, many component suppliers took the opportunity to offer multiple solutions to improve driving comfort or performance such as luggage rack, fuel gauge (OS), water thermometer (Boyer-Meter), speedometer, and watch (Jaeger, OS), shock absorbers (Houdaille, Repusseau), front brakes (Poulet, Acmos), engine improvements (Super-Culasse Desprez, Transformations F. Crespelle, Ruby-Ricardo cylinder head).

Vehicles imported to England or assembled there were retrofitted with side lamps, rear-view mirrors, windscreen wipers, and speedometers by the importer in Slough (London).

== Models ==
In 1922–23, the "2-seater Torpedo" T2 and the "2-seater Cabriolet" TL were mounted on the short chassis (C2). In October 1923, these bodies, as well as the "Delivery Car" VL and the "3-seater Torpedo " T3-1 will then be mounted on the long chassis (C3). In October 1924, the Torpedo T3-1 was replaced by the "3-seater Torpedo Cloverleaf" T3-2 with room for a single passenger in the rear.

The Citroën system of naming car types, chassis and bodywork was complex and confusing. The lack of historical documentation due to the total destruction of the archives during the war allowed errors and legends to develop and spread in the following decades. It is now accepted that only two types of cars: the "C" and "C "3 types on two chassis types: the "C.2" (short) and "C.3" (long) types were marketed... in spring 1922 and October 1923 respectively.

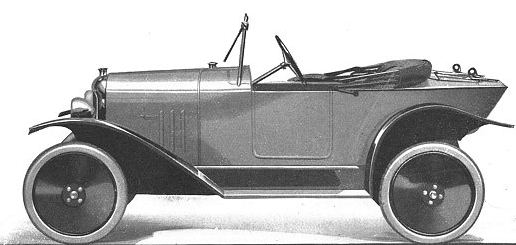
5HP C2 Torpédo 2 seater original version – Oct.1921

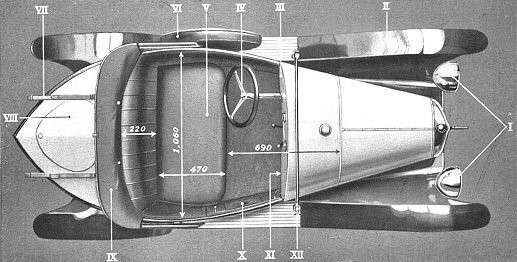
5HP C2 T2 Torpedo2 seater

=== Torpédo 2 seater T2 ===
Production: Short wheelbase Chassis C2: May 1922 to September 1923 ... then Long wheelbase chassis C3: October 1923 to Spring 1925

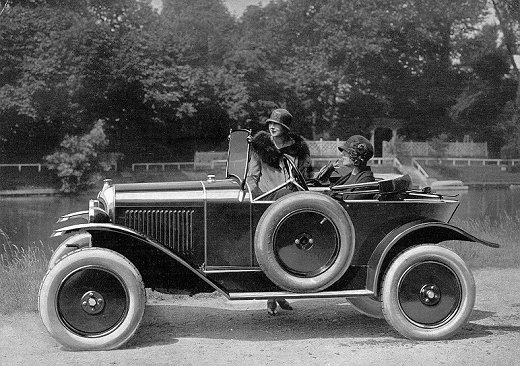
5HP C3 T2 Torpédo 2 seater 1924

Its back end gave the "Torpedo" a sporty look but it also added the nickname "Cul de Poule"(hen's bottom).

The original (C2-1922/23) body colour was yellow then with the introduction of the long chassis (C3-1924/25), colours available were: Bordeaux red, blue, or Havana (brown).

The comfortable bench seat was covered with leatherette initially (C2): black, then (C3): red, black (for blue cars), or brown.

The floor covering was a brush carpet. Door storage pockets were fitted in the door and alongside the driver.

The spare wheel was mounted on the driver's side. The door hinges were not visible.

At the rear of the car was a chest, accessible from the top, and closed by a lid. On the boot lid could be fitted two supports to fit a trunk of dimensions 40 x 80 cm.

The running boards were made of aluminium reinforced with long grooves. They were black in colour, the top of the grooves was polished.

The wings and bodywork were made of the black painted metal sheet.

The headlamps (bowls: black paint; rims: nickeled) were connected by an adjustable nickel-plated crossbar.

The polished and machined aluminium dashboard was simple, with only an ammeter and a headlight/ignition switch.

The pivot point of the movable windshield was placed in the top third section.

The convertible top was openable around a single axis and covered with a waterproof fabric. The hood irons were bent ash. All-weather equipment (side curtains) was provided.

The flat-profile wings, called "flat wings" (ailes plates) were replaced for the 1926 model by "round wings" (ailes rondes): very few such cars were made.

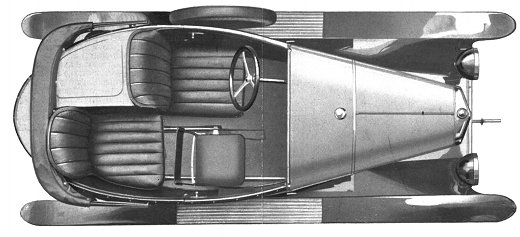
Citroen 5HP Torpedo T3-1

=== "Torpedo 3-seater a Strapontin " (with "folding seat) T3-1 ===
Production: Long wheelbase chassis C3: October 1923 to September 1924.

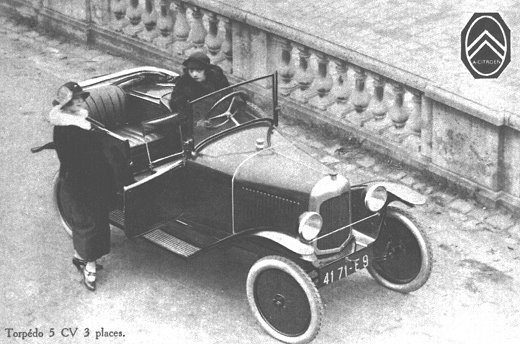
5HP C3 T3-1 Torpedo 3-seater a Strapontin – Catalog 1923

The body, based on the 2-seater "Torpedo" but with a rounded rear end was enlarged to be more spacious. The spare wheel was mounted on the driver's side.

Its door was enlarged by 7 cm compared to model T2.

The boot compartment was located behind the driver's seat. It was accessible from above and closed by a lid.

The driver's seat was fixed. The passenger seat-mounted on two cylindrical rails could be moved back and forth. At the front, under the dashboard, was a folding jump seat that could be mounted when the passenger seat was in the rear position.

Body colour: Bordeaux red, blue, or Havana. A small number were painted green (moss green).

Seats and interior fittings: leatherette red, black (for blue car), or brown.

The floor covering was a black brush carpet.

Door storage pockets were fitted in the door and alongside the driver.

This model had a limited production (only 8000) because the customers did not like the discomfort of the folding seat. This model has since been improperly called "Faux Trefle" (false clover leaf) by collectors.

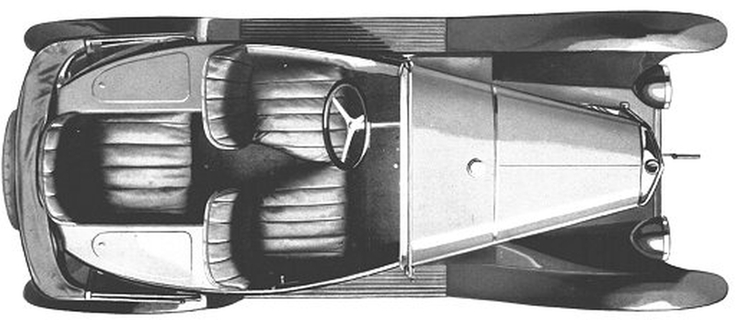
5HP C3 T3-2 Torpedo 3-seater Trefle

=== "Torpedo 3-seater Trefle " ( Clover leaf ) T3-2 ===
Production: Long wheelbase chassis C3: October 1924 to June 1926.

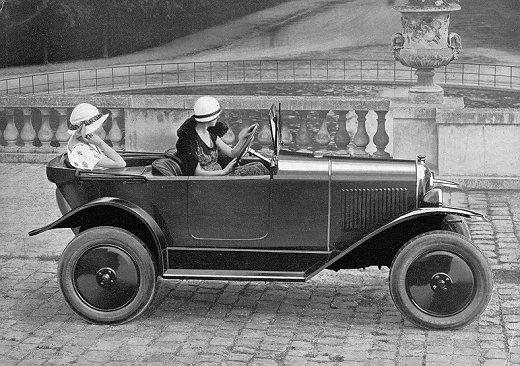
5HP C3 T3-2 – Catalog 1924

This model replaced T3-1.

At the front, were two individual seats; the third seat was placed at the rear, in the centre, hence the nickname "Torpedo Trefle". A passage between the front seats allowed access to the rear seat.

Two small compartments were placed to the right and left of the rear seat. They were accessible from above and closed by a lid.

Body colour: dark beige until December 24, then became Bordeaux red, Canon blue or Havana.

Seats and interior fittings in leatherette: red or black for red cars; black for blue cars; brown or black for Havana cars.

The floor covering was a black brush carpet.

Door storage pockets were fitted in the door and alongside the driver.

The spare wheel was fitted at the back.

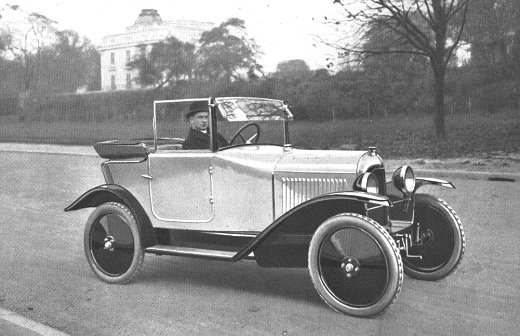
5HP C2 cabriolet TL Oct 1922

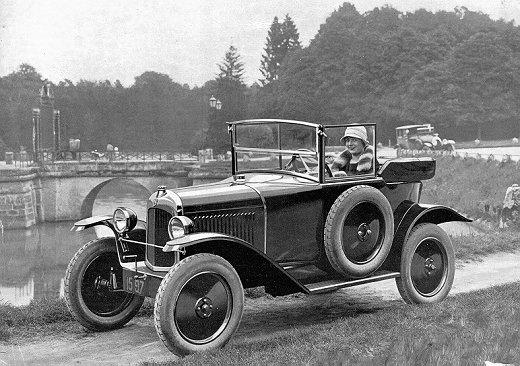
5HP C3 Cabriolet TL – Catalog 1924

=== "Cabriolet" ( convertible ) TL ===
Production: Short wheelbase chassis (C2): March 1923 to September 1923 ... then Long wheelbase chassis (C3) : October 1923 to June 1926.

The "cabriolet" was a more luxurious and comfortable version than the Torpedo; notably thanks to the hermetic closure of the hood and the sliding windows transforming the car into a closed version; which earned it the misnomer "Coupe Docteur" by collectors. The hood was made of black imitation leather, with a fabric liner, and metal hoops. It could be opened and closed from the inside. On long wheelbase chassis, the hood became available in red, brown, or black imitation leather.

Body colour: yellow or Havana (C2- mid-1923), then (C3-mid-1923/26): Bordeaux red, Canon blue, or Havana. Seats and interior fittings: leatherette: red or black for red cars; black for blue cars; brown or black for Havana cars.

The floor covering was black brush carpet.

Door storage pockets were fitted in the door and alongside the driver.

On the short wheelbase chassis, the lid of the luggage compartment was larger than on the T2 model; which did not allow the fitting of the external luggage rack; Following Customers complaints, the long-wheelbase chassis reverted to the smaller lid.

Inside, behind the seats, there was a hatch closed by a lid giving access to the trunk.

A T-shaped door handle was mounted on the outside. The hinges are visible.

A comfortable bench seat offered enough space for two people. On the first models, the passenger seat was slightly narrower for ease of access.

On the short-wheelbase chassis, the dashboard was polished machined aluminium; on the long-wheelbase chassis, it was replaced by mahogany varnished with inlaid cabinetry friezes on the dashboard and inlays on the strips below the windows.

The two side windows could go down into the interior of the door and were operated by a strap as on the railway cars of the time. These windows could also be kept clipped in the high position when the hood was open.

The windshield was in two parts, the upper part opens towards the front in order to give more fresh air and some visibility in case of heavy rain.

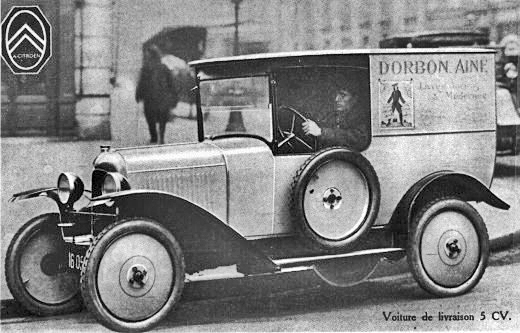
5HP C3 VL

=== " Voiture de Livraison" (Delivery Car) VL ===
Production: Chassis Long (C3): Early 1924 to mid-1925

The payload of the vehicle was 125 kg. This was considered insufficient by the clientele, hence the reduced production volume (1083 units).

The internal dimensions of the utility section are 750 mm long, 1,070 mm wide and 1,070 mm wide.

The car had two separate seats, imitation leather. The driver's seat was fixed; the passenger's cushion could be removed.

The roof is a single piece consisting of a wood frame covered with moleskin or leatherette

Door storage pockets were fitted in the door and alongside the driver.

The dashboard was made of black lacquered sheet metal.

The handrails were made of aluminium and painted black.

The windshield was in two parts, the upper part opens towards the front as on the Cabriolet;

The area at the rear was equipped with two swing doors.

In the front passenger partition was a sliding door allowing carrying loads of 1500 mm long.

The vehicle had only one door, optionally to the right or left, which opened forwards. On both sides, were curtains made of waterproof canvas.

Body color: Havana; Seats: black leatherette.

The floor was covered with rubber.

== Gallery ==
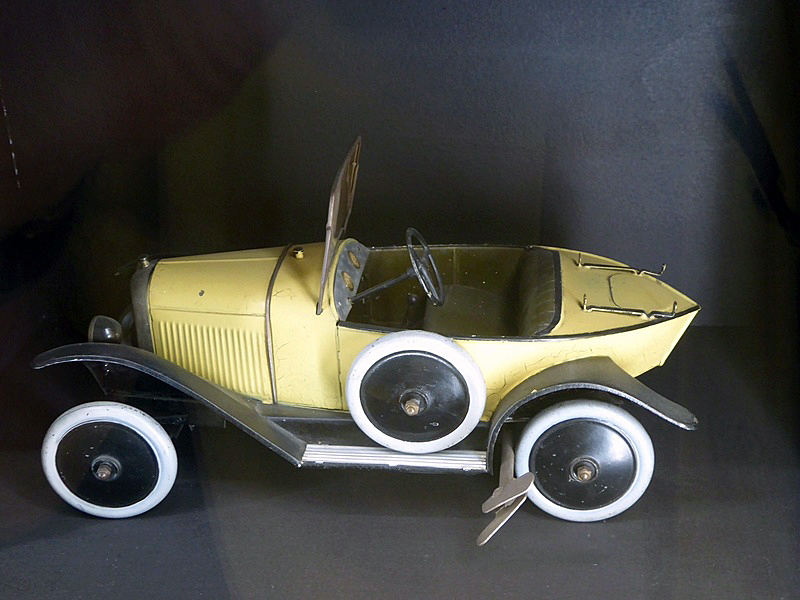
Toy 5HP Torpedo T2

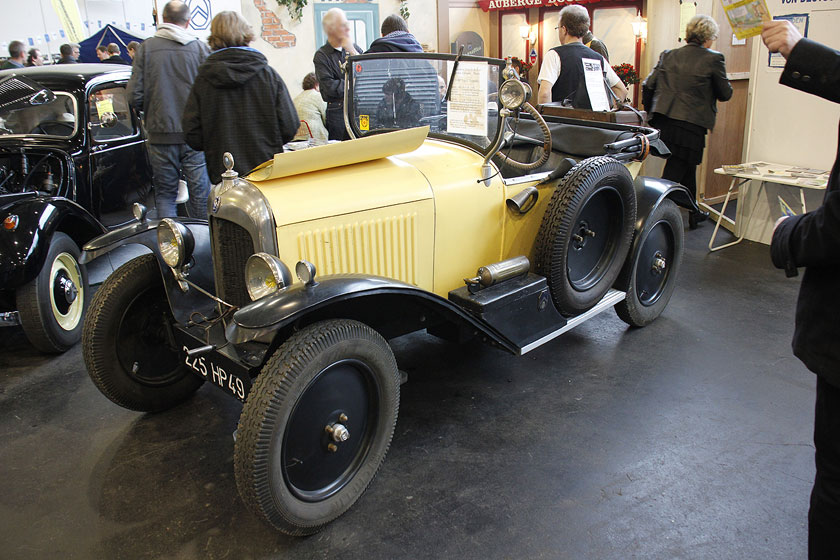
5HP C2 T2 Yellow

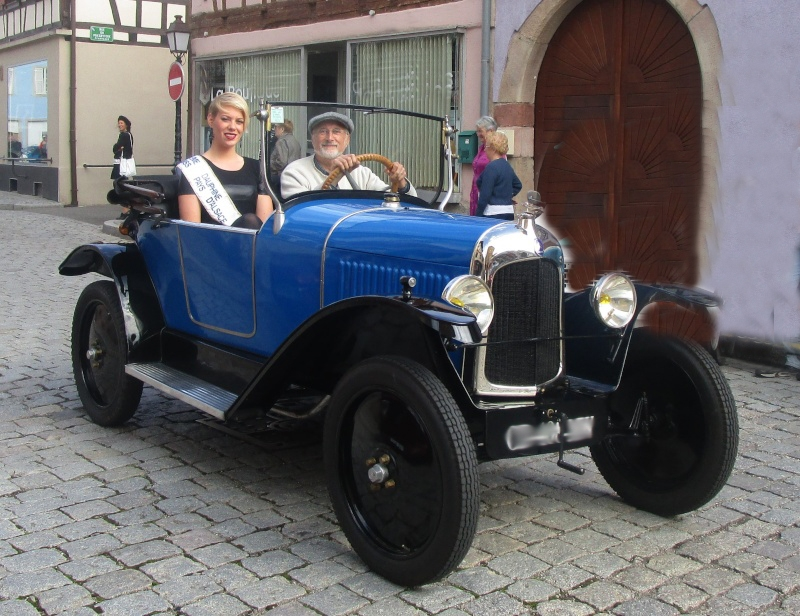
5HP C2 T2 1923

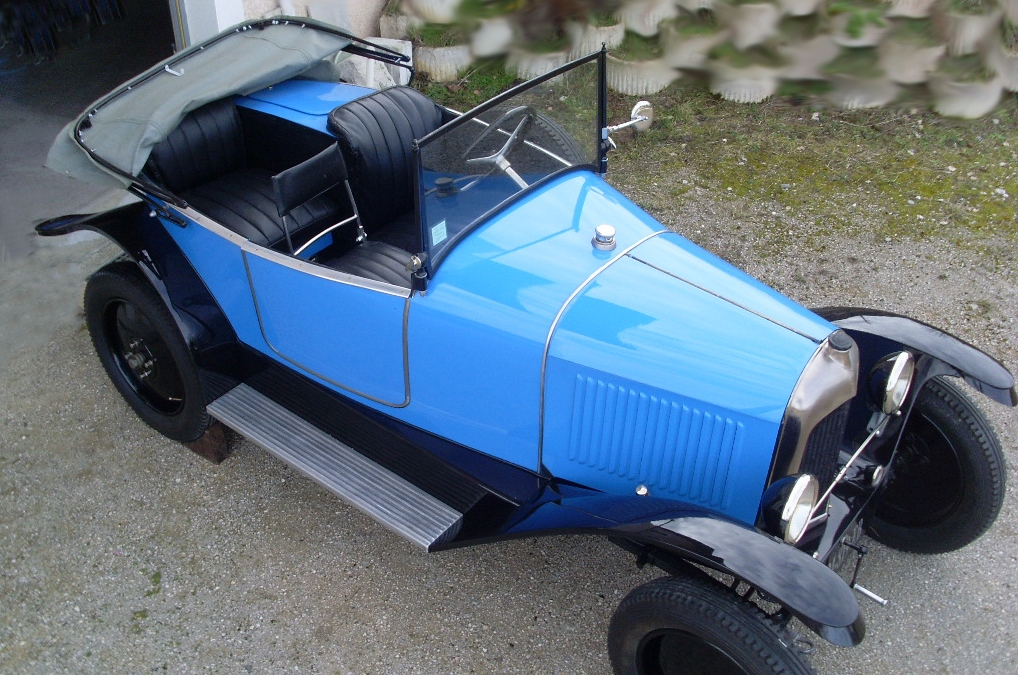
5HP C3 T3-1

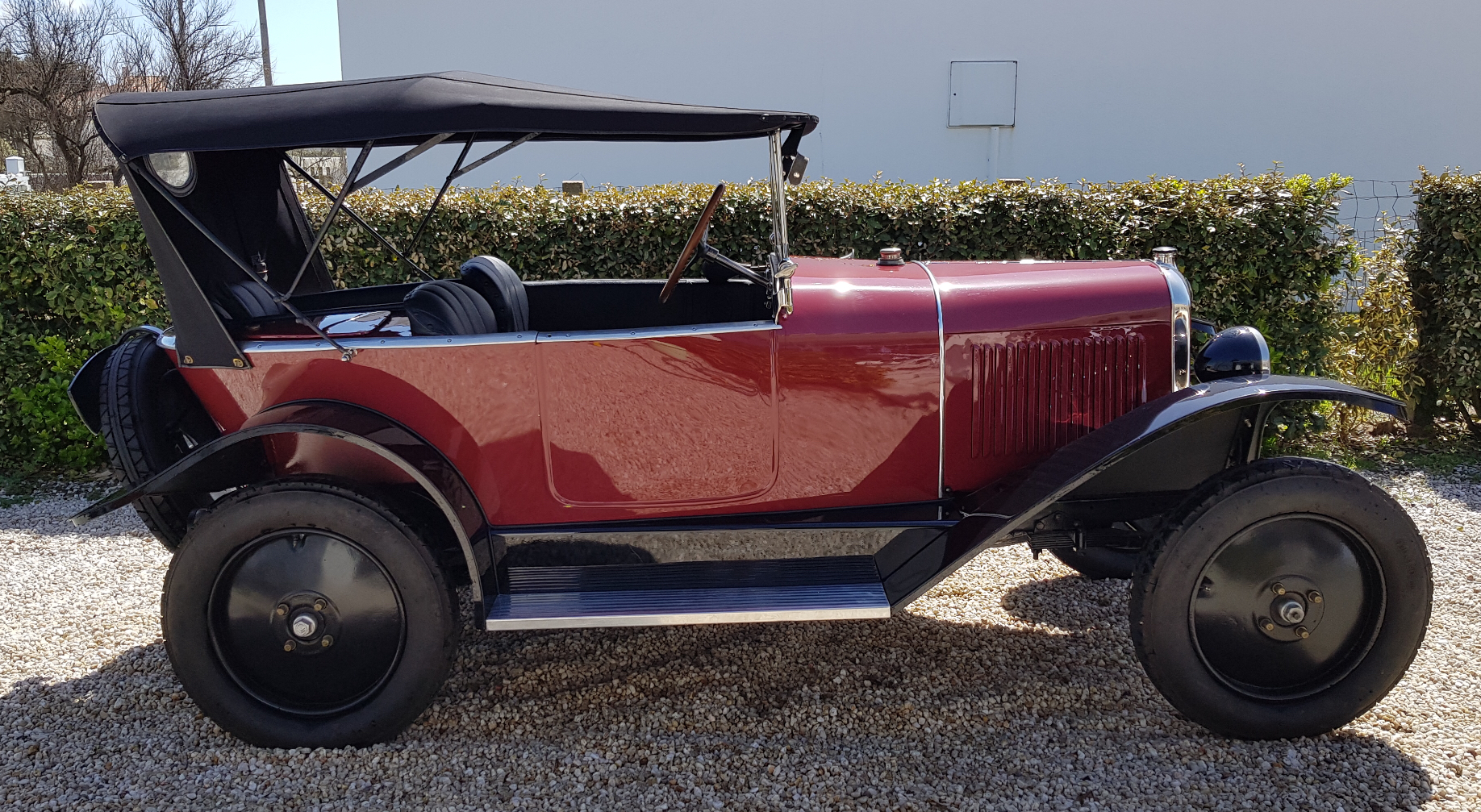
5HP C3 T3-2 1924

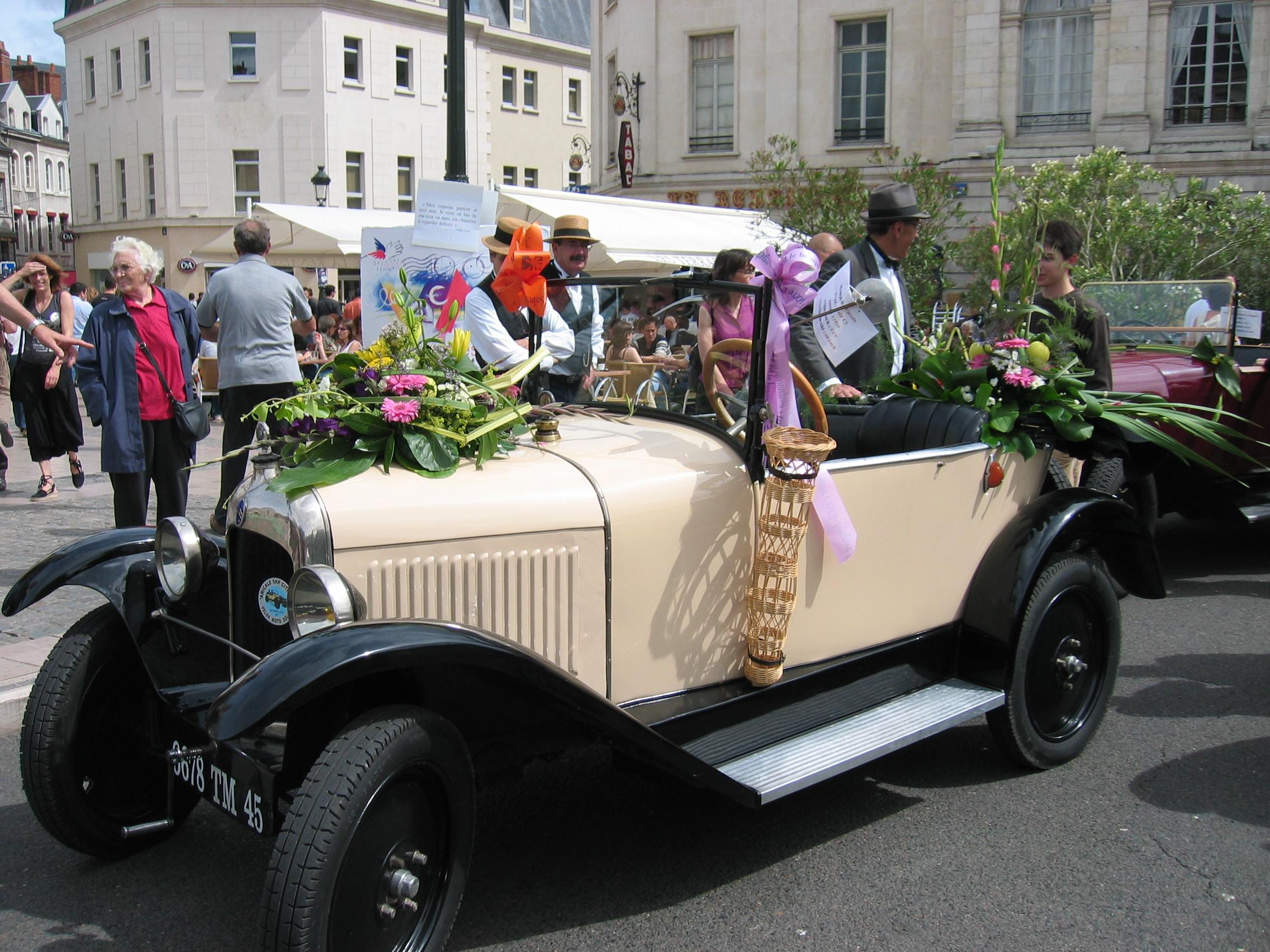
5HP C3 T3-2 Beige

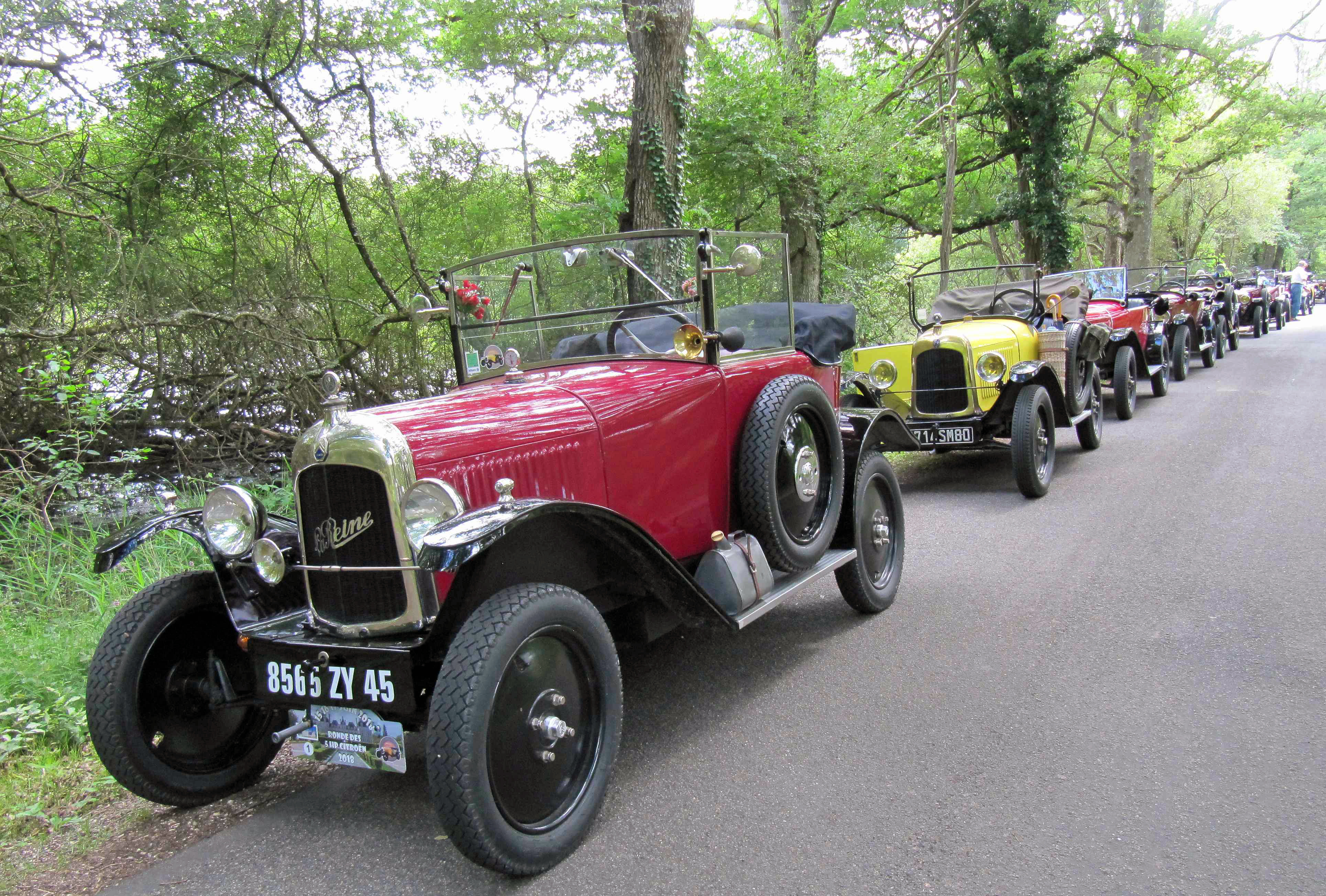
5HP C3 TL 1924

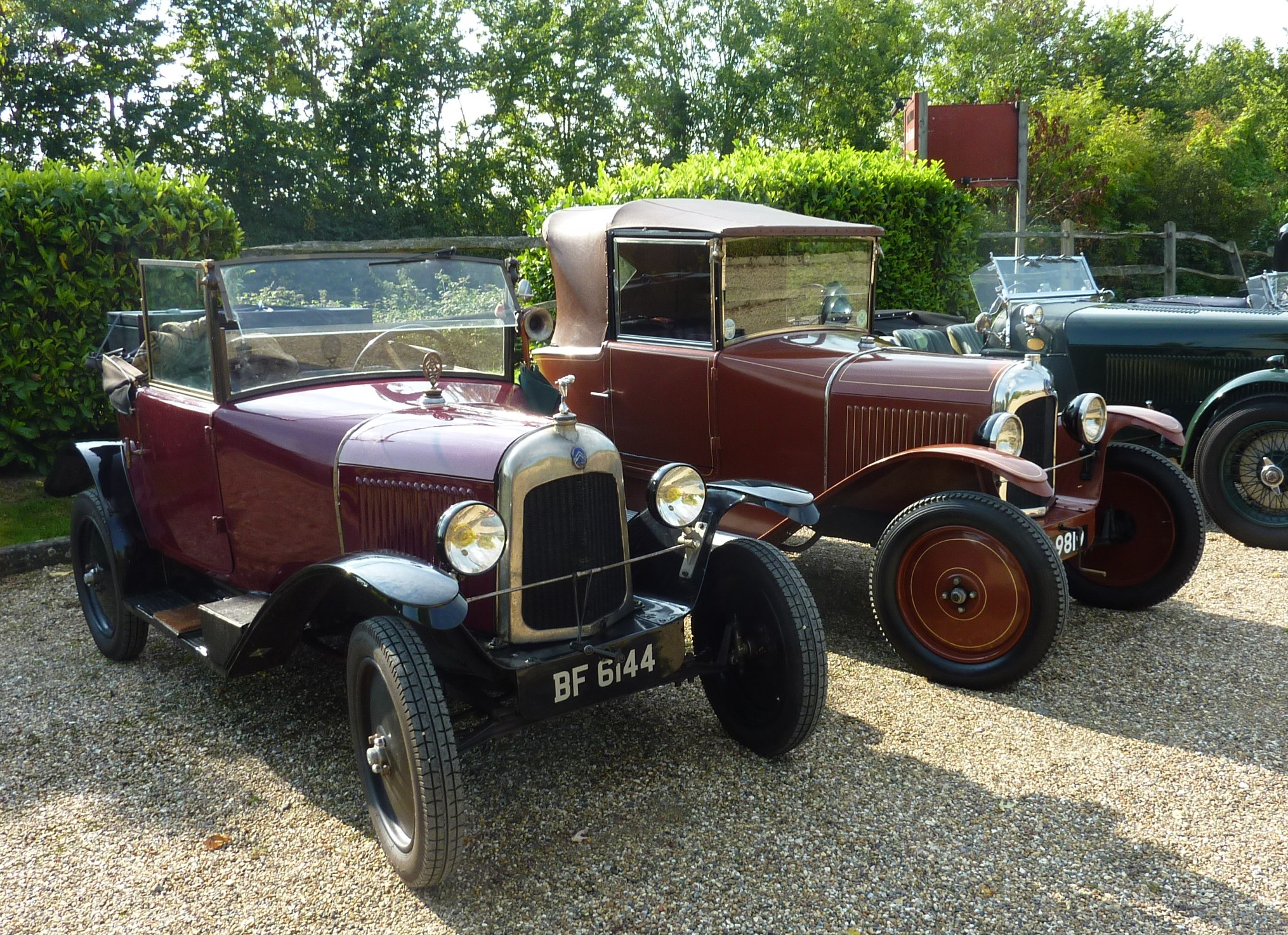
5HP Cabriolets TL 1924

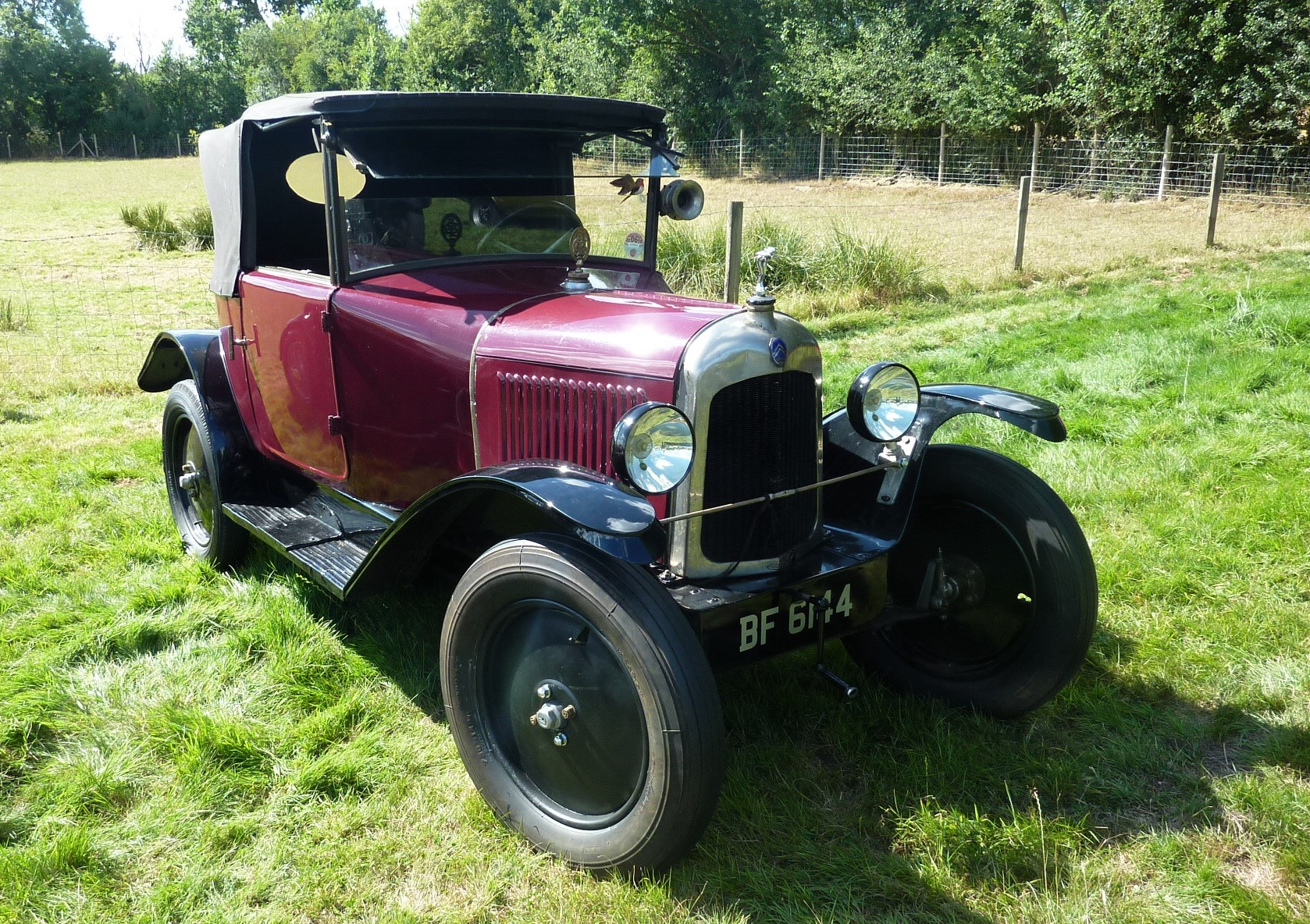
5HP TL Bordeaux red

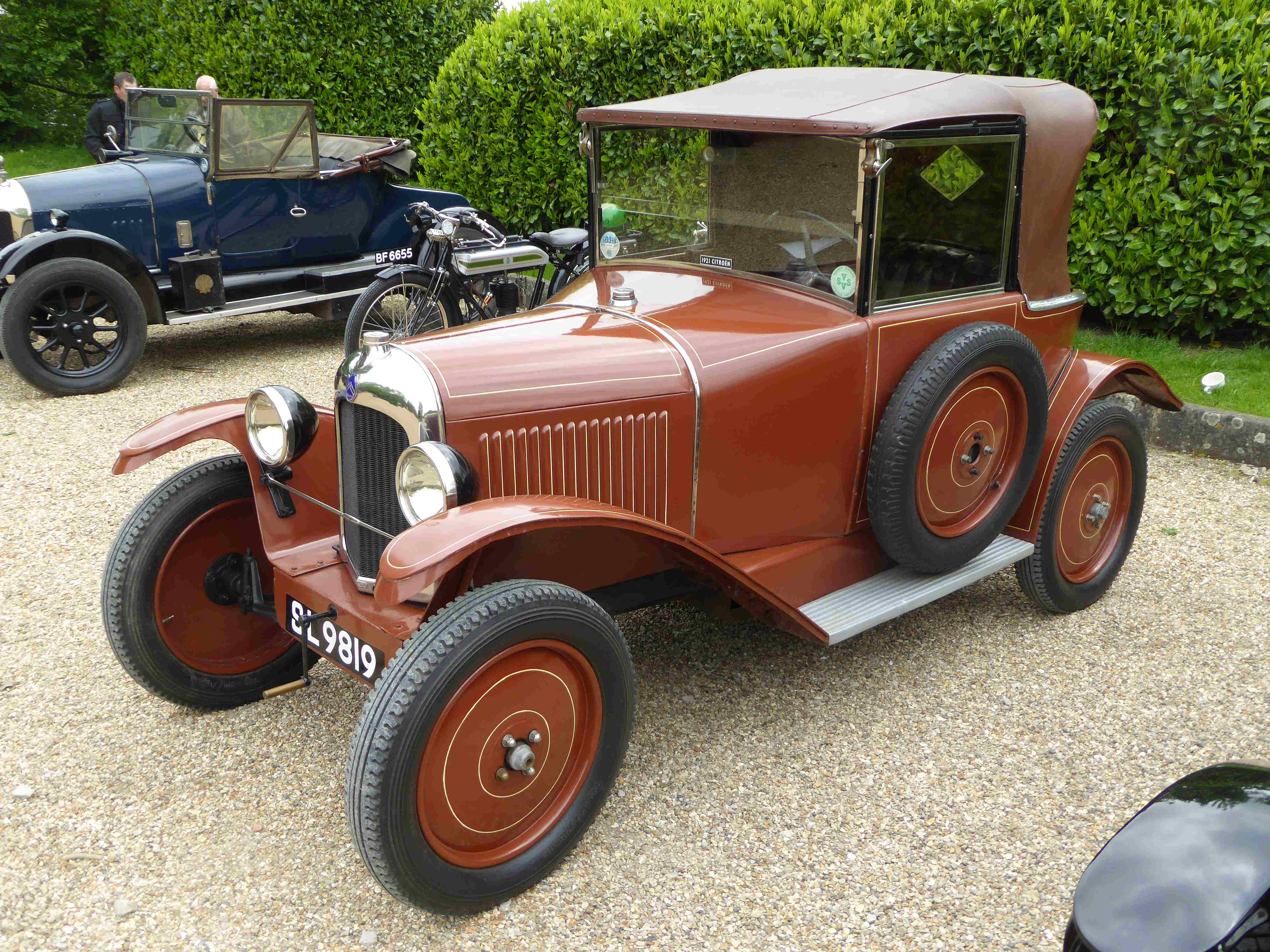
5HP TL Havana

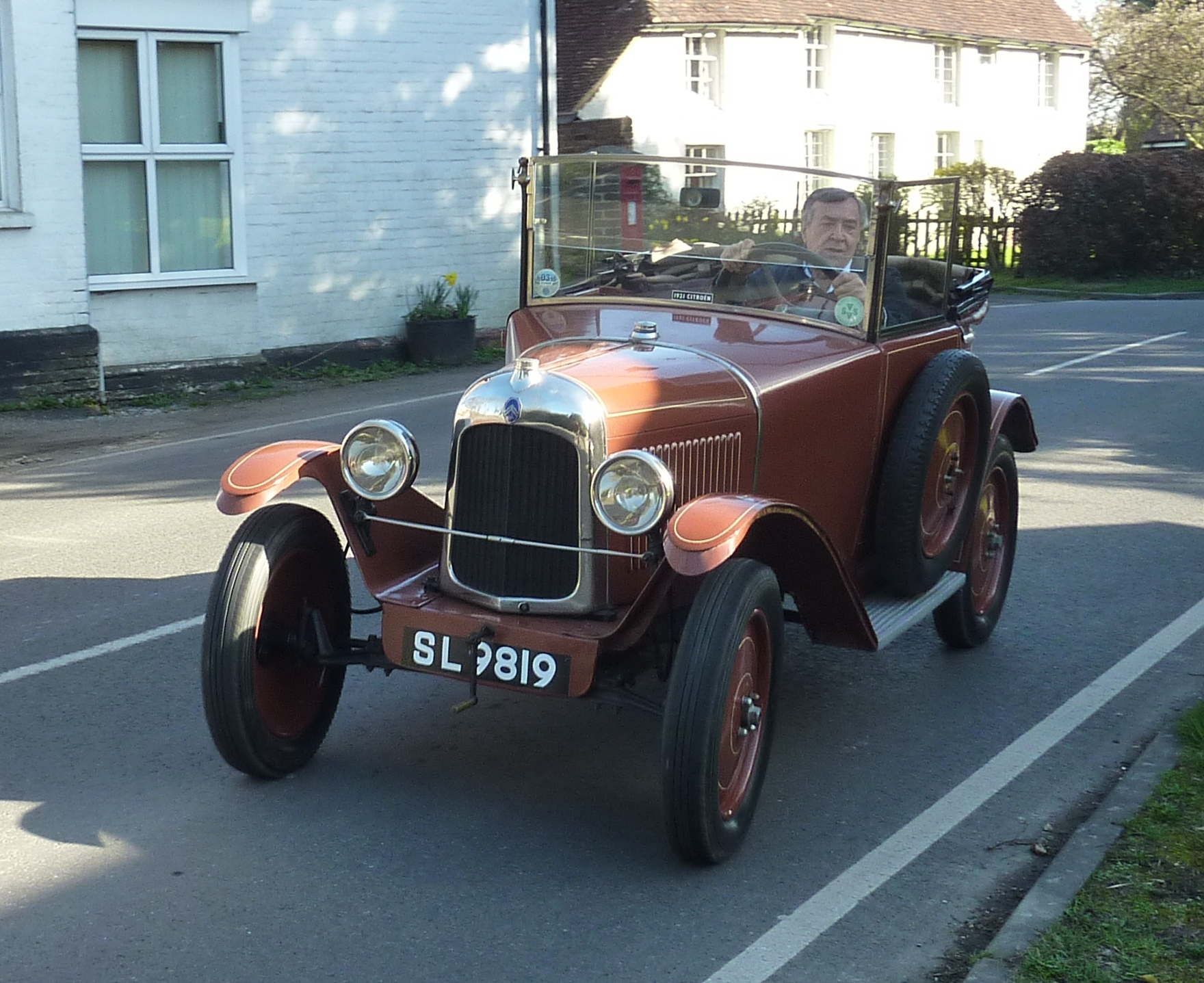
5HP TL Havana

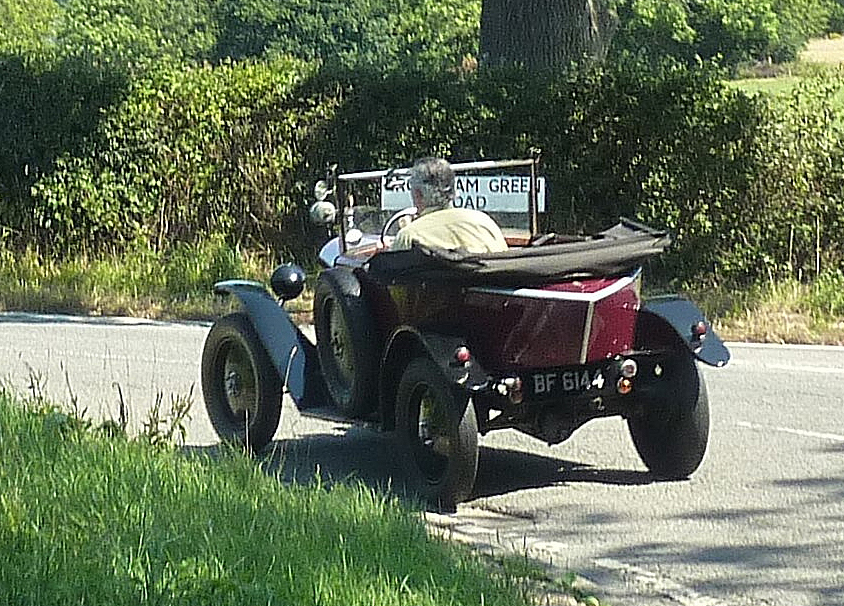
5HP TL Bordeaux red

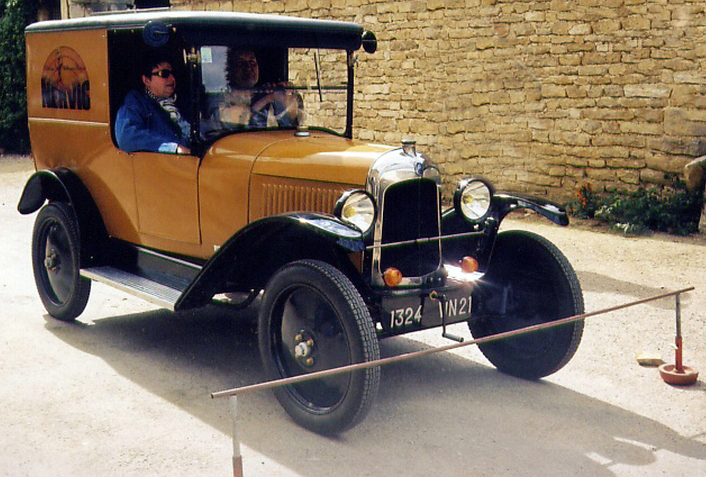
5HP VL Havana

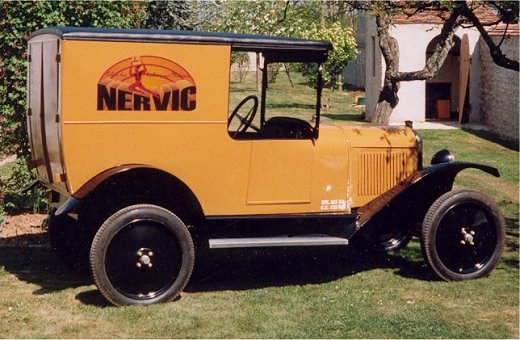
5 HP C3 VL Voiture de Livraison 1924

== Sources ==
- Reynolds, John (1996). André Citroën – The man and the motor car. John Reynolds. Sutton Publishing. ISBN 0-905778-32-4.
- Bernard Laurent, Citroën 5HP, Éditions Bernard Laurent, février 2006.
- Mohacek, Bozi. ""A brief History of Andre Citroen and of the 5CV Citroen Model C"". www.svvs.org.
- Willy Schafroth. "Citroën 5HP". citroen-5hp.ch (in French, English, and German)..
- Paul Blank. "The First Car Around Australia". classicrally.com.au..
- National Museum of Australia. "Video : First Car Around Australia". .

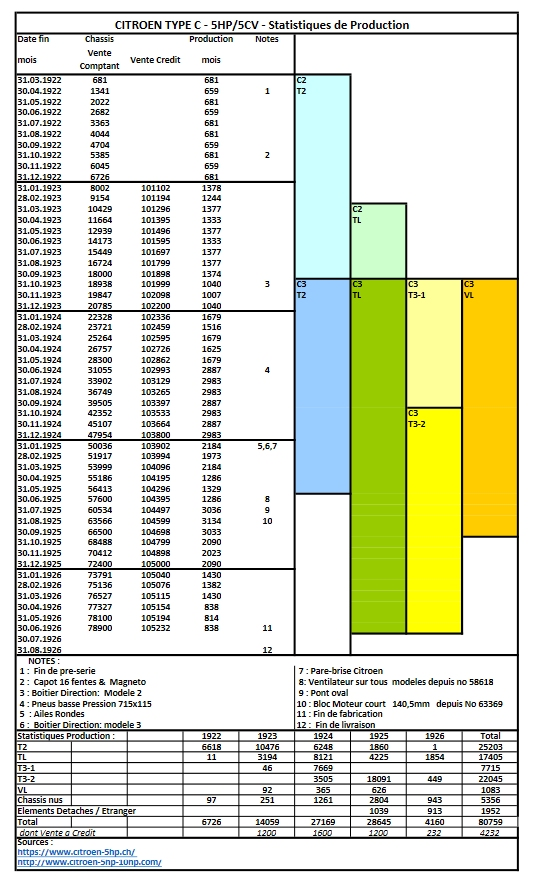
Datation per chassis no and model, plus production stats per year and model
