= Opel Olympia =

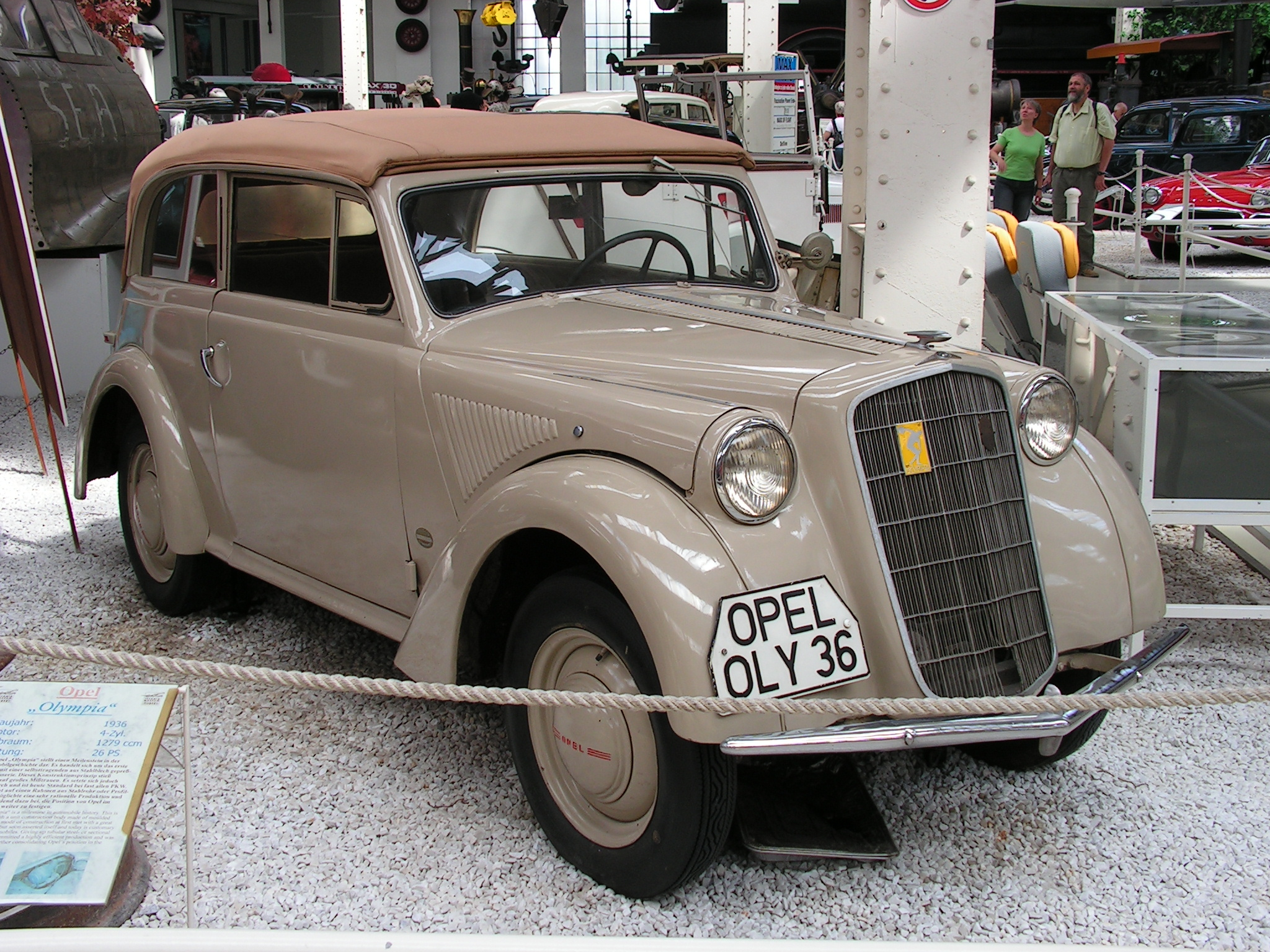
- 1936 Opel Olympia

Overview
- Manufacturer: Opel
- Production: 1935–1940; 1947–1953; 1967–1970

Body and chassis
- Class: Compact / Small family car (C)

Chronology
- Predecessor: Opel 1,3 Liter
- Successor: Opel Olympia Rekord

The Opel Olympia is a compact car by German automaker Opel, then part of G.M., from 1935 to 1940, and after World War II continued from 1947 to 1953. It was one of the world's first mass-produced cars with a unitary body structure, after the 1934 Citroën Traction Avant; and it was a mass-production success, made in six-figure numbers. Opel achieved this even before the war, all while Hitler promised Germany a "Volkswagen" - a 'People's car', which didn't materialize until 1946. From 1967 to 1970 the Olympia badge was briefly reused on a later car.

The 1935 Olympia was Germany's first mass-produced car with an advanced all-metal unitary body - even a full monocoque in the case of the closed-roof saloon models. This for its time revolutionary technology supplanted the previously customary vehicle body, supported on top of a separate load-bearing chassis, reducing the car's weight by up to 180 kilograms (400 lb.) compared to its predecessor. Production of the unibody design required new production methods and materials. Wood framing in the car's body was all but eliminated - instead, advanced types of sheet-steel, fastening by spot welding, and a new production line layout were among the many advances introduced with the Olympia.

The car was first presented in February at the 1935 Berlin Motor Show; production got under way later during that year. The Olympia was named in anticipation of the 1936 Berlin Olympic Games. The pre-war Olympia was made in two versions: From 1935 to 1937 the Olympia had a 1.3-litre engine; for the OL38 version made from 1937 to 1940 this was replaced by a 1.5-litre overhead valve unit.

Between 1935 and 1940, over 168,000 units were built. The car was also Opel's first post-war automobile when it re-entered production in 1947. This time it was built until 1953. The name Olympia was revived for a second time in 1967 for a luxury version of the Opel Kadett B.

== Opel Olympia (1935–1937) ==
Opel Olympia
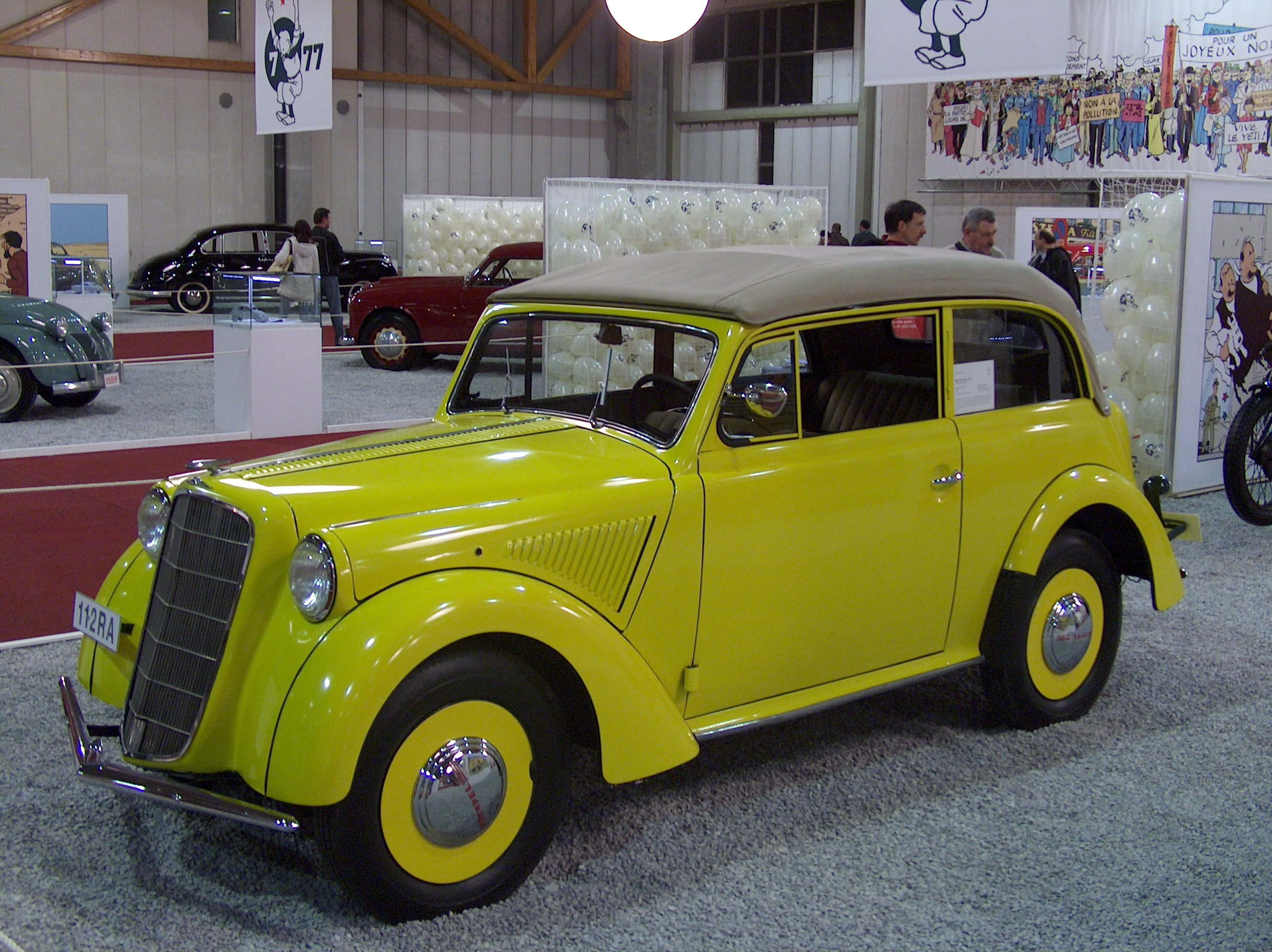

Overview
- Production: 1935–1937; 81,661 produced
- Assembly: Germany: Rüsselsheim; Indonesia: Tanjung Priok

Body and chassis
- Body style: 2-door saloon 2-door cabriolet

Powertrain
- Engine: 1.3 L side valve I4
- Transmission: 3- or 4-speed manual

Dimensions
- Wheelbase: 2.37 m (93.3 in)
- Length: 3.93 m (154.7 in)
- Width: 1.43 m (56.3 in)
- Curb weight: from 809 kg (1,784 lb)

At 2500 Reichsmark it offered a true four-seater with 1.3-litre, four-cylinder, side-valve, 24 PS (18 kW) engine capable of 100 km/h (62 mph). Drive was to the rear wheels through a three-speed gearbox but a four-speed unit became available in 1937. The car had independent front suspension with a live axle at the rear and semi-elliptic leaf springs. This car was also assembled in Tanjung Priok, near Jakarta, in the then-Netherlands East Indies. Assembly there began in 1938 and the car was marketed as the "Opel 1.3".

The car was made available in two versions, as a two-door saloon and as a two-door soft-top convertible:

- LZ 2-door 5-window saloon, costing 2500 Reichsmark
- CL 2-door 5-window cabriolet

== Opel Olympia OL38 (1937–1940, 1947–1949) ==
Opel Olympia OL38
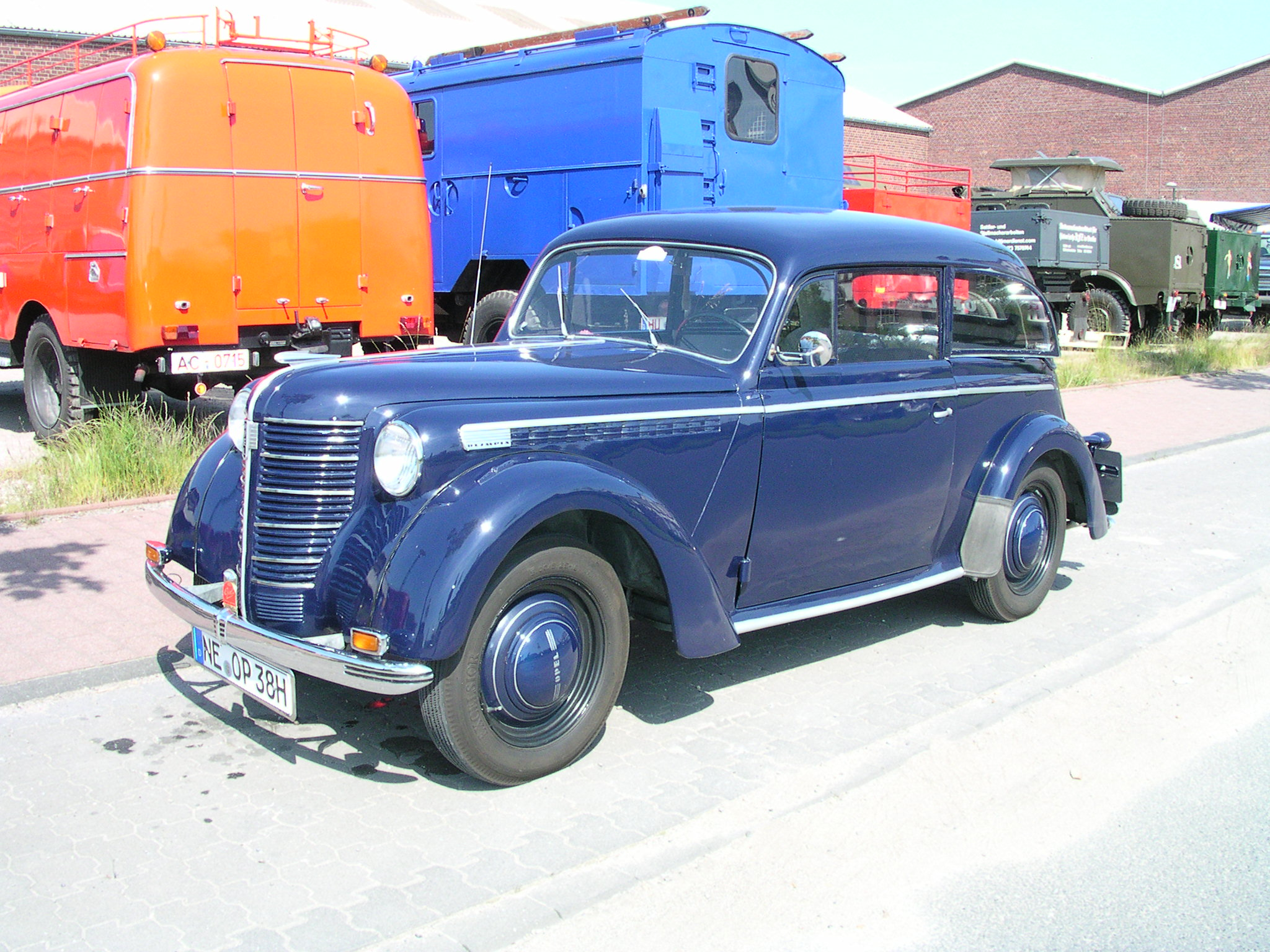

Overview
- Production: 1937–1940; 1947–1949
- Assembly: Germany: Rüsselsheim

Body and chassis
- Body style: 2-door saloon 4-door saloon 2-door cabriolet

Powertrain
- Engine: 1.5 L OHV I4

Dimensions
- Wheelbase: 2.43 m (95.7 in)
- Length: 4.02 m (158.3 in)
- Width: 1.50 m (59.1 in)
- Curb weight: from 816 kg (1,799 lb)

In 1937, after just a few years, the Olympia received both a new engine, as well as a revised body. The new, larger motor now introduced overhead valves, and a capacity of 1,488 cc (91 cu in). It produced some 50% more power, increased to 37 PS (27 kW), with the car's top speed now reaching 112 km/h (70 mph).

This engine was to remain in production until 1960 with only minor changes and its architecture was also used for the 2.5-liter "six" installed in the Opel Super 6 and Kapitäns.

The car's body was also altered, not only giving it a facelift and adding a 4-door saloon version, but also making the cars somewhat bigger overall - both 7 cm (3 in) wider and 9 cm (3.5 in) longer, but also on a 6 cm (2.4 in) longer wheelbase.

It was available in the same versions as its predecessor with the addition of the 6-light LV:

- LZ 2-door 4-light saloon, 2675 Reichsmark
- LV 4-door 6-light saloon, 2950 Reichsmark
- CL 2-door 4-light cabriolet, 2750 Reichsmark

Due to World War II, production came to a halt in late 1940. During the war, the Opel plant in Rüsselsheim was severely damaged by allied bomb attacks.

After reconstruction, production of the Olympia was announced in November 1947 and restarted the following month. Opel had been building the six-cylinder Blitz truck since July 1946; it would have made sense to restart production of the Kapitän before the Olympia since it used the same engine as the Blitz. However, occupation regulations prohibited civilian sales of passenger cars of over 1.5 liters' displacement at the time. Externally, the OL 38 looked unchanged to the pre-war car, but the fragile and complex Dubonnet front suspension was replaced by a more conventional control arm and coil spring one. Only the two-door saloon was produced after the war. Until the end of 1949, 25,952 of these were made.

== Opel Olympia 1950 (1950–1953) ==
Opel Olympia 1950
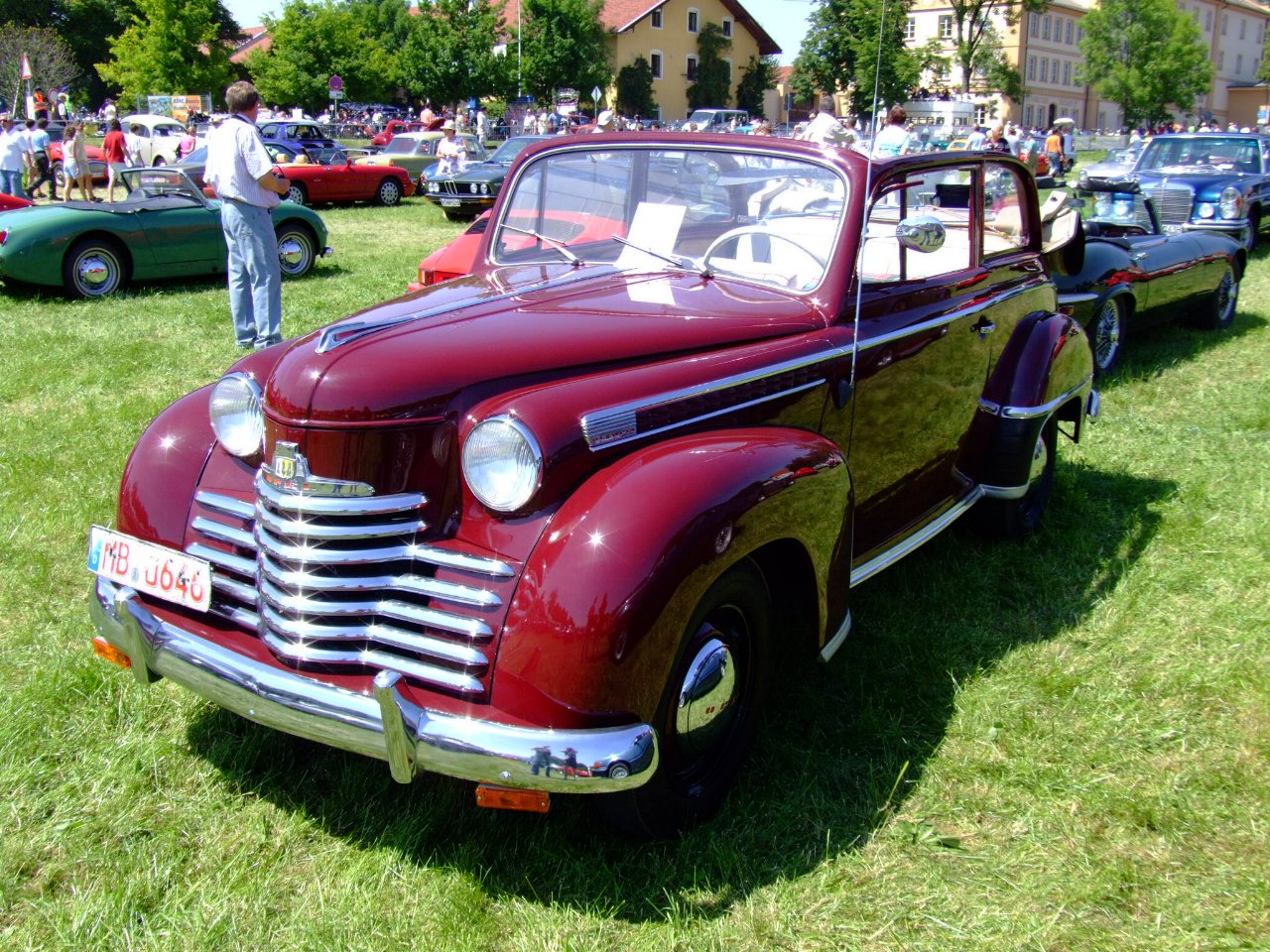

Overview
- Production: 1950–1953
- Assembly: Germany: Rüsselsheim

Body and chassis
- Body style: 2-door saloon 2-door cabrio coach 2-door estate 2-door panel van

Powertrain
- Engine: 1.5 L OHV I4
- Transmission: 3-speed manual column shift

Dimensions
- Curb weight: 890 kg (1,960 lb)

In January 1950 the Olympia got a modernized body, but the car was still based on the pre-war Olympia. One change was the seemingly retrograde change to a column-shifted three-sped manual from the floor-mounted four-speed used before. The following bodies were offered:

- 2-door saloon, 6400 Deutsche Mark
- 2-door cabrio-coach, 6600 Deutsche Mark
- 2-door kombi (estate), 7350 Deutsche Mark

The kombi was built by Karosserie Miesen. In February 1951, the Olympia was upgraded with more modern 15- rather than 16-inch wheels and a trunk compartment which enclosed the spare tyre. In just over three years of production (until March 1953), about 160,000 cars were made.

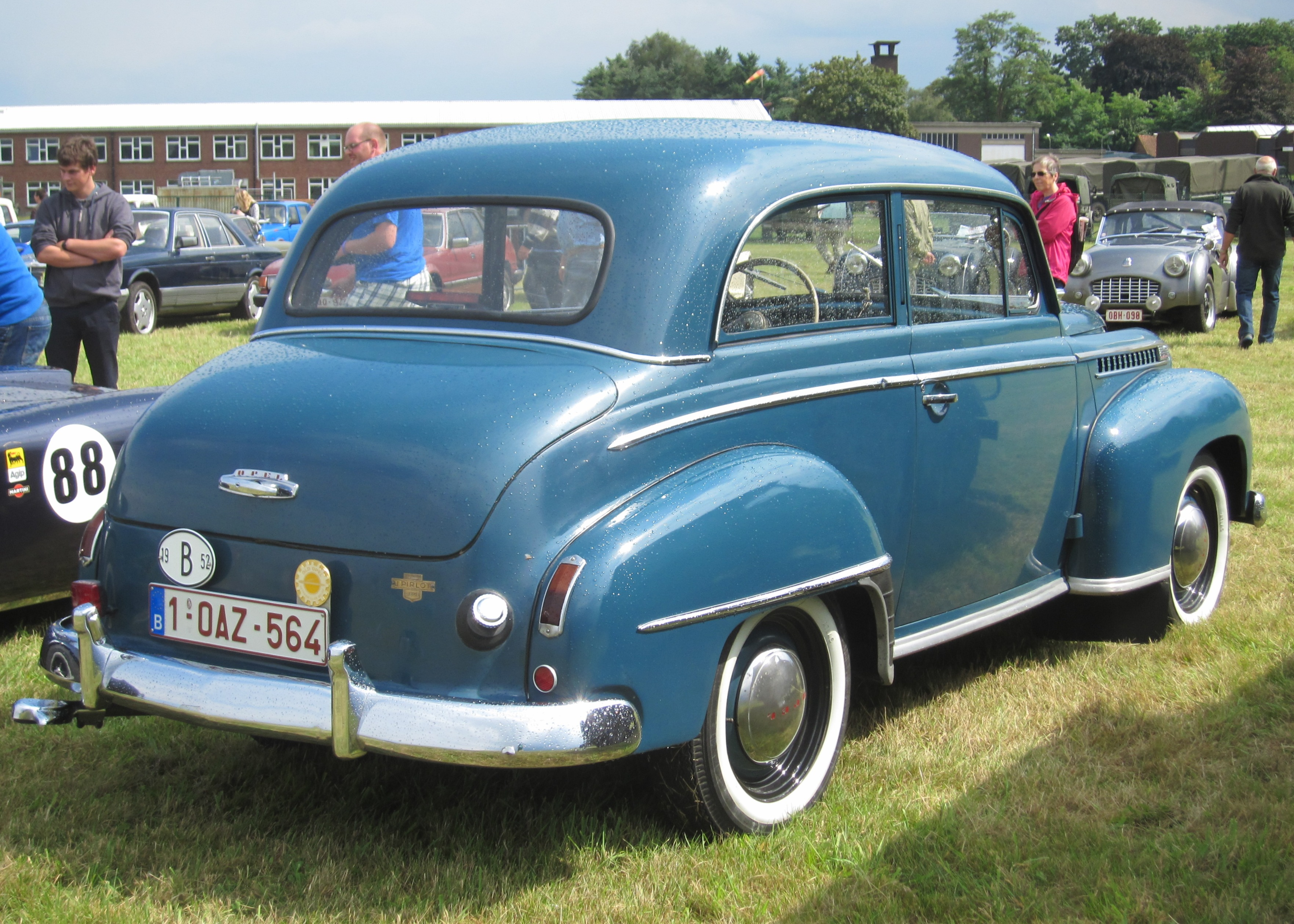
Opel Olympia Berline (saloon) 1952

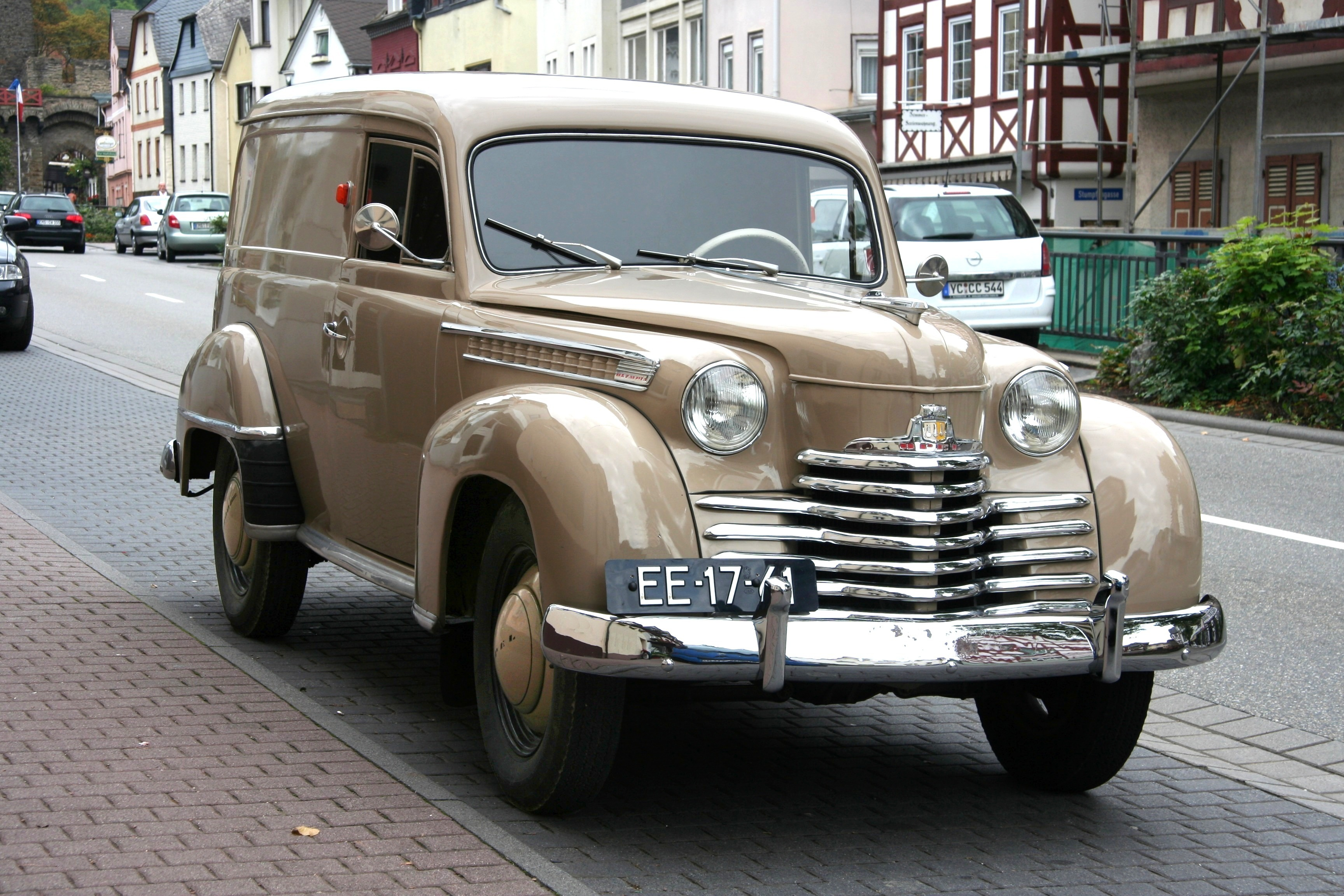
Opel Olympia panel van

== Successor: Opel Olympia Rekord (1953–1957) ==
In March 1953, the 18-year-old design of the Olympia was finally replaced by the Opel Olympia Rekord, with a modern pontoon body. In 1957 the "Olympia" part of the name was dropped, and the car was sold simply as the Opel Rekord until 1986, although the Rekord was an executive car compared to the Olympia which was a small vehicle.

== Opel Olympia A (1967–1970) ==
Opel Olympia A
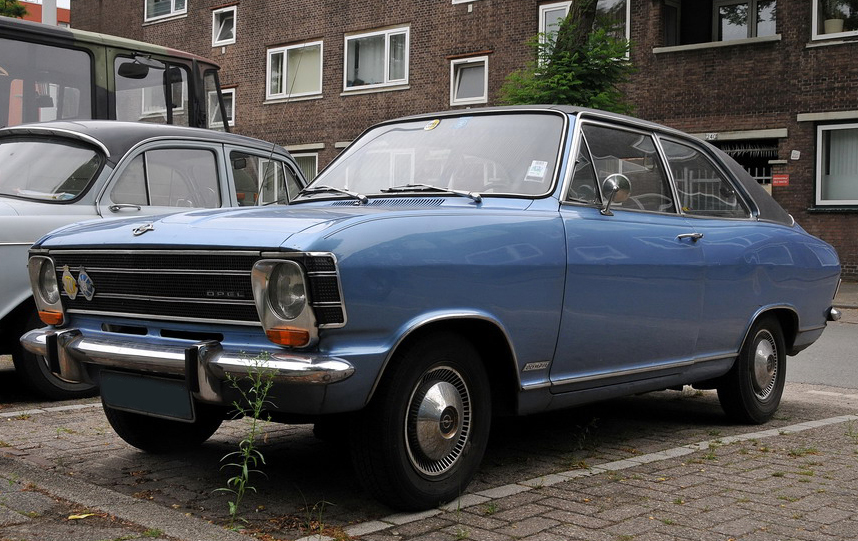
- Opel Olympia A 2-door saloon (1968)

Overview
- Manufacturer: Opel (General Motors)
- Production: 1967–1970
- Assembly: West Germany: Bochum

Body and chassis
- Class: Small family car (C)
- Body style: 2/4-door fastback saloon; 2-door coupé
- Related: Opel Kadett B

Powertrain
- Engine: petrol: 1078 cc OHV I4; 1492 cc CIH I4 (export); 1698 cc CIH I4; 1897 cc CIH I4
- Transmission: 4-speed manual

Dimensions
- Wheelbase: 2,416 mm (95.1 in)
- Length: 4,182 mm (164.6 in)
- Width: 1,573 mm (61.9 in); 1,614 mm (63.5 in) (4-door)
- Height: 1,400 to 1,405 mm (55.1 to 55.3 in)
- Curb weight: from 770 kg (1,700 lb)

In August 1967 Opel revived the Olympia name with the new Olympia A. The name had last been used, until 1959, for a reduced specification version of the Opel Rekord, but now it was applied to a luxury derivative of the Opel Kadett B, readily distinguishable from the outside by its redesigned front end, together with the word "Olympia" appearing on the body sides behind the front wheels. Olympias were also often equipped with a black vinyl roof to help set them apart from their lesser brethren.

Giving the Olympia its own name may have distanced it from the Kadett in the Opel showrooms and enabled the manufacturer to charge a premium price, but in other respects the new Olympia did not convincingly fill the gap in the range that had opened up between small family cars and big family cars, the Rekords having grown ever larger with each new generation.

The Olympia was available in saloon and coupé-bodied versions. The saloon, available with two or four doors, shared the fast-back "Limousine" body of the "Kadett LS", while the Olympia coupé used the same body as the "Kadett coupé F". The Olympia was fitted with the "1100 SR" twin carburettor 60 PS (44 kW) engine, and could also be ordered with any one of the three high-compression Camshaft in Head (CIH) engines also fitted in the Kadett and providing 75 PS (55 kW), 90 PS (66 kW) or, in those export markets where the 1.5-litre version was available, 65 PS (48 kW). At this time, Opel also provided SAE power figures which were 67 hp for the 1.1 and 76, 84, and 102 hp for the 1.5, 1.7, and 1.9-litre versions.

The Olympia A was withdrawn in August 1970, by when 80,637 had been produced. The Olympia's demise cleared the way for the Opel Ascona, produced from August 1970 and introduced to the market in November 1970. The Ascona filled the gap between the smaller Kadett and the larger Rekord more obviously and, in terms of the sales figures, more persuasively than the Kadett-based Olympia, defining in the German auto-market a new mid-weight family car class where it would be joined by the Ford Taunus TC and, a couple of years later, by the Audi 80 and the Volkswagen Passat.

The Olympia design did live on in a manner, as the front design was used on United States-bound Kadetts from the 1968 model year until replaced by the next generation, and on South African Opel Kadetts beginning with the 1971 model year.

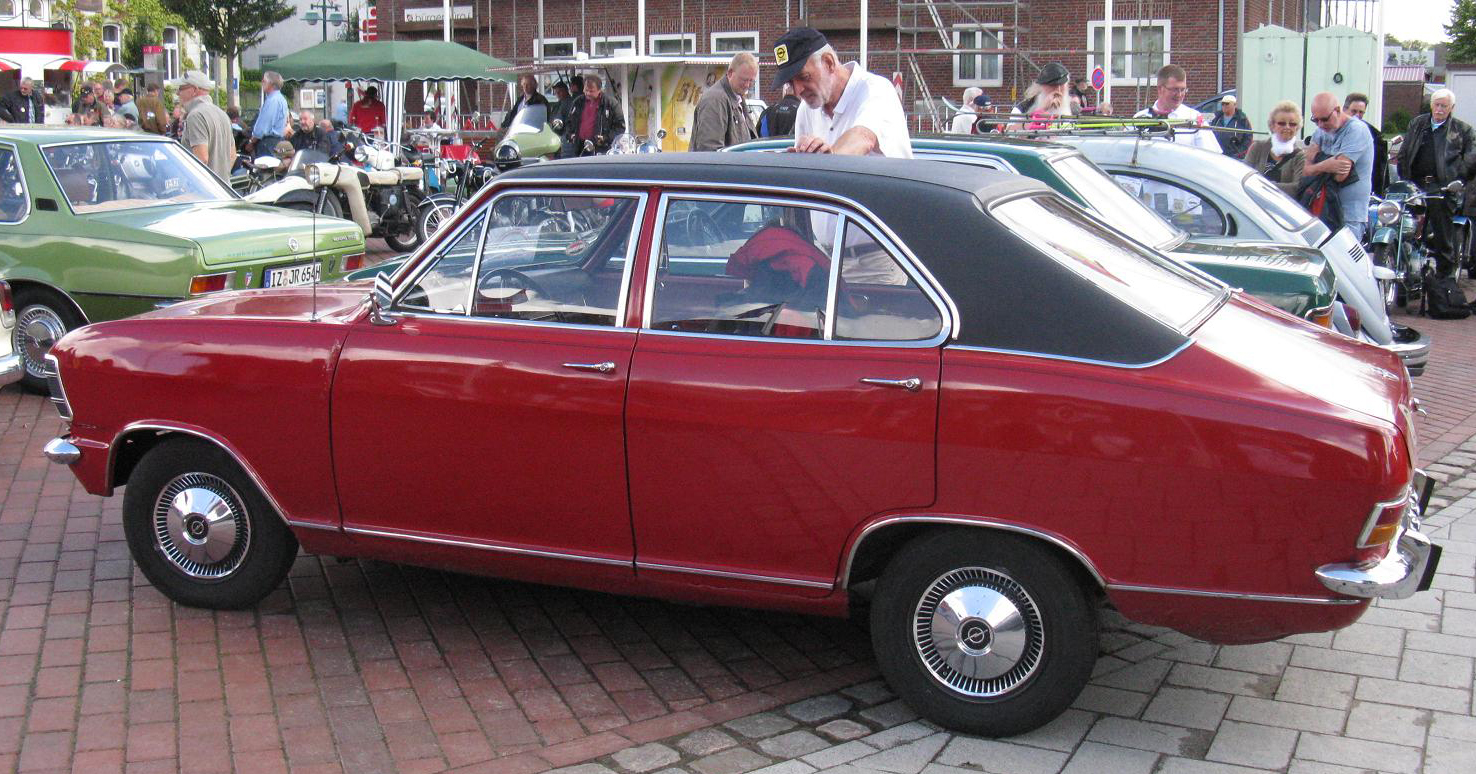
Opel Olympia (A) four-door fastback saloon

Body styles were:

- 2-door fastback saloon
- 4-door fastback saloon
- 2-door coupé
