= Opel 1,3 Liter =

Opel 1,3 Liter (typ 1397)
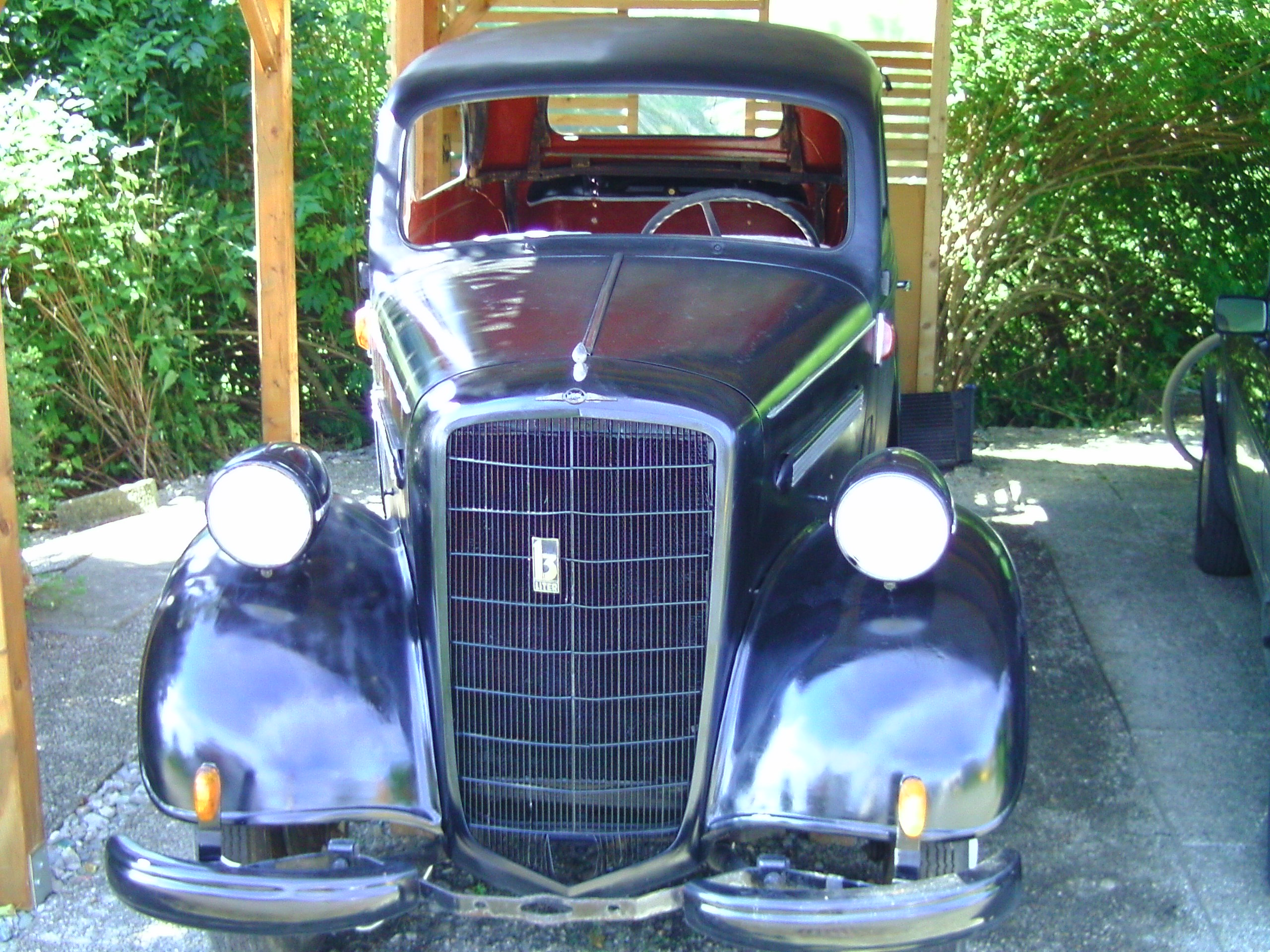

Overview
- Manufacturer: Opel (General Motors)
- Production: 1934–1935
- Assembly: Germany: Rüsselsheim

Body and chassis
- Class: Small family car (C)
- Body style: 2/4-door saloon; 2-door cabrio coach; 2-door cabriolet
- Layout: FR layout

Powertrain
- Engine: 1288 cc side-valve I4
- Transmission: 4-speed manual No synchromesh

Dimensions
- Wheelbase: 2,474 mm (97.4 in)
- Length: 4,225 mm (166.3 in)
- Width: 1,475 mm (58.1 in)
- Height: 1,595 mm (62.8 in)

Chronology
- Successor: Opel Olympia

The Opel 1,3 Liter (typ 1397) is a small car manufactured by Opel from 1934 to 1935. Production commenced in January 1934, although a few (officially 2) pre-production cars had been built during the final part of 1933.

More than two-thirds of the 1,3 Liters produced were made in the single year of 1934, but the car continued to be manufactured until October 1935, by which time its successor, the innovative unitary bodied Opel Olympia, had already been in production for some six months. During its brief production run, the Opel 1,3 Liter was a big seller, with 19,840 of the cars produced in 1934 alone, representing the equivalent of 15 percent of the overall German auto-market – although even the 1934 volume never toppled Opel’s own 1,2 Liter from its top spot in the market place.

== Origins ==
The 1,3 Liter can be seen both as a potential successor and as complementary to the popular Opel 1,2 Liter, though production of both cars was formally ended in the autumn of 1935. The 1,3 Liter, developed by General Motors in North America, was like its predecessor engineered with ease of manufacture in mind. The car was designed around a new "torsion resistant" box frame chassis and featured a fashionably streamlined body. This incorporated an unusually large (by the standards of the time) boot at the back, which could be accessed via a lid from outside the car.

The brakes were now hydraulically controlled, in place of the cable-based system that had stopped the 1,2 Liter, and which continued after 1935 to be fitted on the upgraded version of the smaller model, the Opel P4.

== Innovative design ==
The 1,3 Liter accordingly embodied visible technical progress in several important respects. Another advance much trumpeted at the time but not uncontroversial in retrospect was the inclusion of “Synchronous springing” (Synchronfederung), also recently introduced by General Motors in North America. The suspension was based on the relatively complex Dubonnet suspension system for which General Motors had acquired a license, but the General Motors approach involved further developments that attempted better to harmonise the springing of the front and rear wheels. The system included an axle beam rigidly attached to the chassis frame which reduced the unsprung weight on the vehicle, and it came with the promise of a smooth ride, but on a car as small and (by North American standards) light as the Opel 1,3 Liter, it attracted criticism for a loss of directional control, especially when the car was not driven in a straight line. Technically astute critics recorded that unless the front wheels were perfectly balanced each time a new tyre was fitted, directional stability was further and alarmingly compromised by savage vibrations travelling up the steering column. As the years continued to roll, the system was presumably refined and the criticisms addressed, but the Opel 1,3 Liter was an early adopter and with a production run of less than two years, was evidently not in production for long enough to benefit from these developments.

== Engine ==
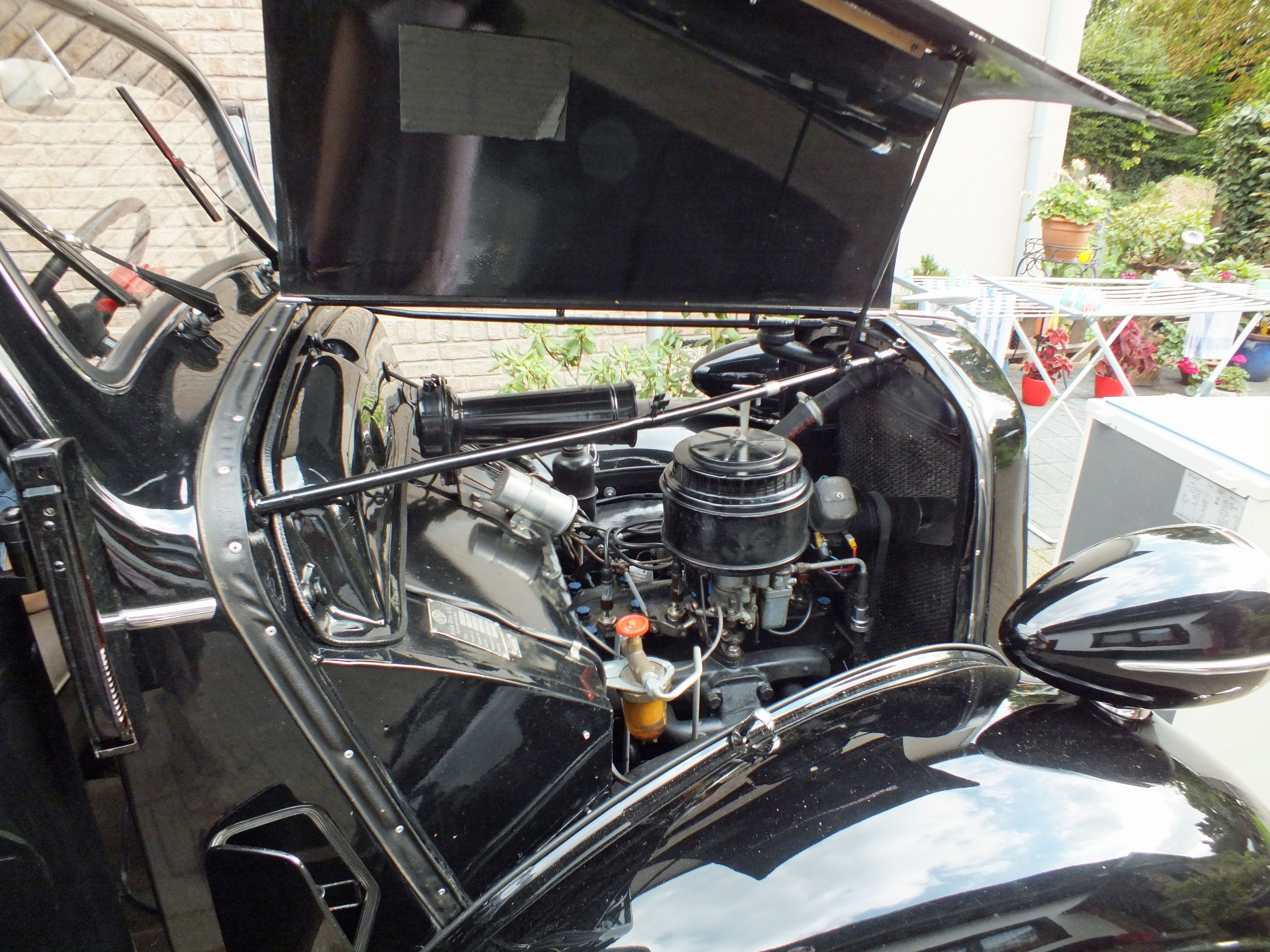
The engine

The 1288 cc four-stroke, side-valve engine delivered a claimed maximum output of 24 PS (18 kW; 24 hp) at 3,200 rpm. Transmission of power to the rear wheels took place via a four-speed manual gearbox without synchromesh.

== Modern bodies ==
The fashionably stream-lined body was available as a two-door Limousine (saloon) priced in 1934 at 2,650 Marks. Also offered was a four-door "six-light" limousine. A Cabrio-Limousine with a foldaway roof-hood was available with either two or four doors. Buyers preferring to make their own arrangements could select an Opel 1,3 Liter in base chassis form for 2,150 Marks. The listed prices increased by 200 Marks in 1935, which was consistent with the continuing period of inflation experienced by the German economy in 1934.

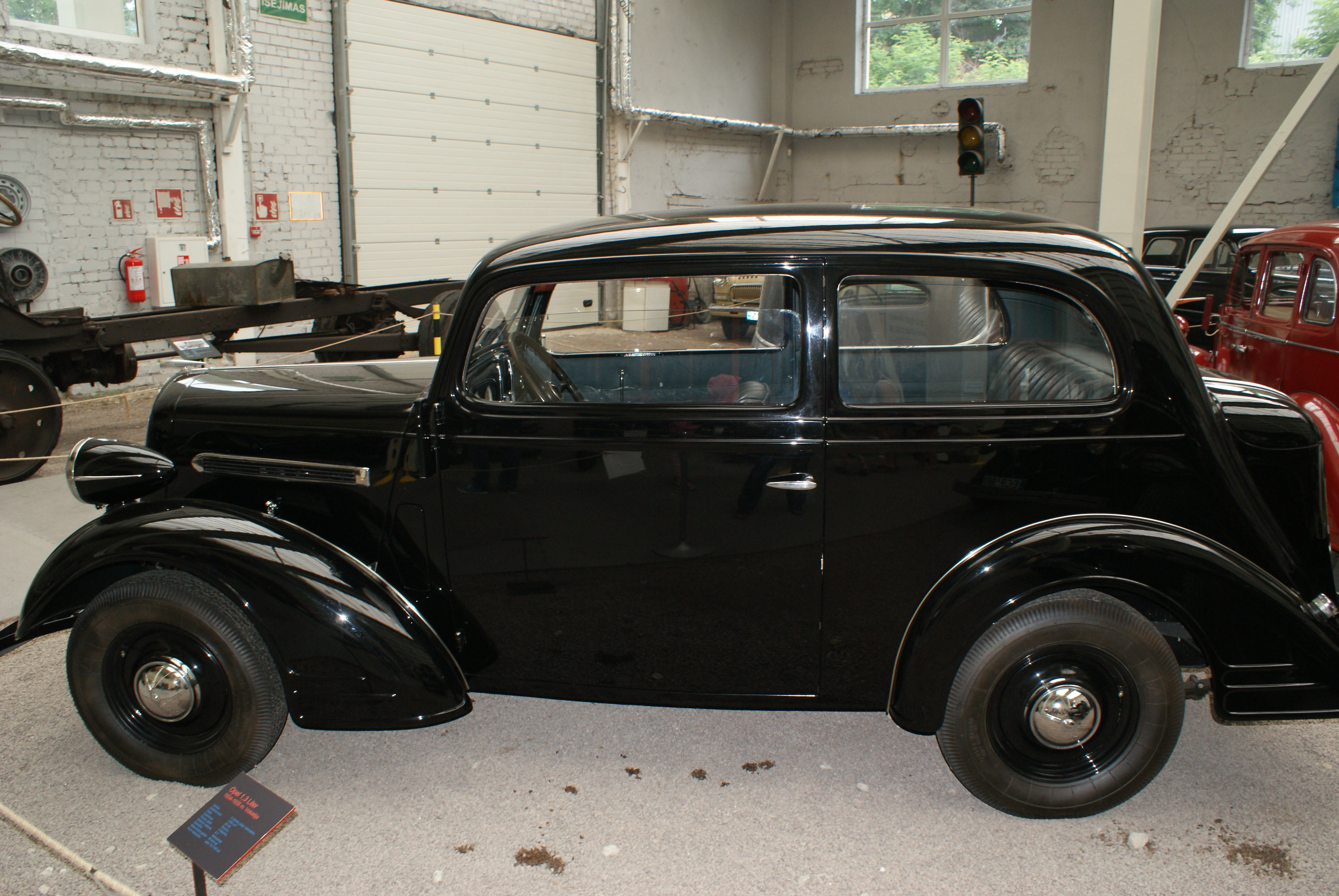
An Opel 1,3 Liter with the two-door saloon bodywork

The Opel 1,3 Liter was introduced at the same time as the 2-litre Opel «6», and was superficially similar to its larger, four-seater sibling, both cars featuring the then newly fashionable streamlined style. The 1,3 Liter was nevertheless significantly shorter than even the short wheelbase version of the 2-litre, with a 2,474 mm (97.4 in) wheelbase compared to the 6-cylinder car's 2,642 mm (104.0 in) wheelbase. At the same time, the 1,3 Liter had a wheel-base that was nearly 200 mm (7.9 in) longer than the 2,286 mm (90.0 in) wheelbase of the smaller Opel 1,2 Liter. With its elaborate suspension and new robust chassis, at 700 kg (1,543 lb) the 1,3 Liter was also more than 20 percent heavier than the 1,2 Liter in base chassis form, and nearly 30 percent heavier once Opel's standard two-door saloon body had been attached. Despite this, the 24 PS (18 kW; 24 hp) maximum output from the car's engine was just a single horsepower higher than on the smaller engined car. The 1,3 Liter came with a listed top speed of 90 km/h (56 mph), which was not unreasonable for its size and class, but it nevertheless acquired a reputation for being seriously underpowered.

== Commercial ==
In slightly under two years, until production ended in October 1935, General Motors's German subsidiary produced 30,758 Opel 1,3 Liters, making it one of the leading contenders in the German auto-market during its short life. Few survive. It was replaced by the Opel Olympia, already in production since April 1935. The first Olympia came with the same 1288 cc engine and the same 24 PS (18 kW; 24 hp) claimed maximum power level, but its modern unitary body was 110 kg (243 lb), over ten percent, lighter – making it faster and more fuel efficient. Presumably the Olympia was also simpler to produce, since the two-door saloon version was advertised in 1935 at 2,500 Marks whereas the equivalent Opel 1,3 Liter was by then offered at 2,850 Marks.

In many respects the Olympia was the car that the 1,3 Liter might have become, but both its novel chassisless construction and the manufacturer's decision to give it a name chosen with marketing considerations – and the forthcoming Olympic Games - in mind, rather than a few hard to fathom digits suggested that with the Opel Olympia the company was more interested in the future than the past.

== Sources and further reading ==
This entry includes information from the equivalent section in the German Wikipedia.

- Oswald, Werner (2001). Deutsche Autos 1920-1945, Band (vol) 2 (in German). Motorbuch Verlag. ISBN 3-613-02170-6.
