= Opel Olympia Rekord =

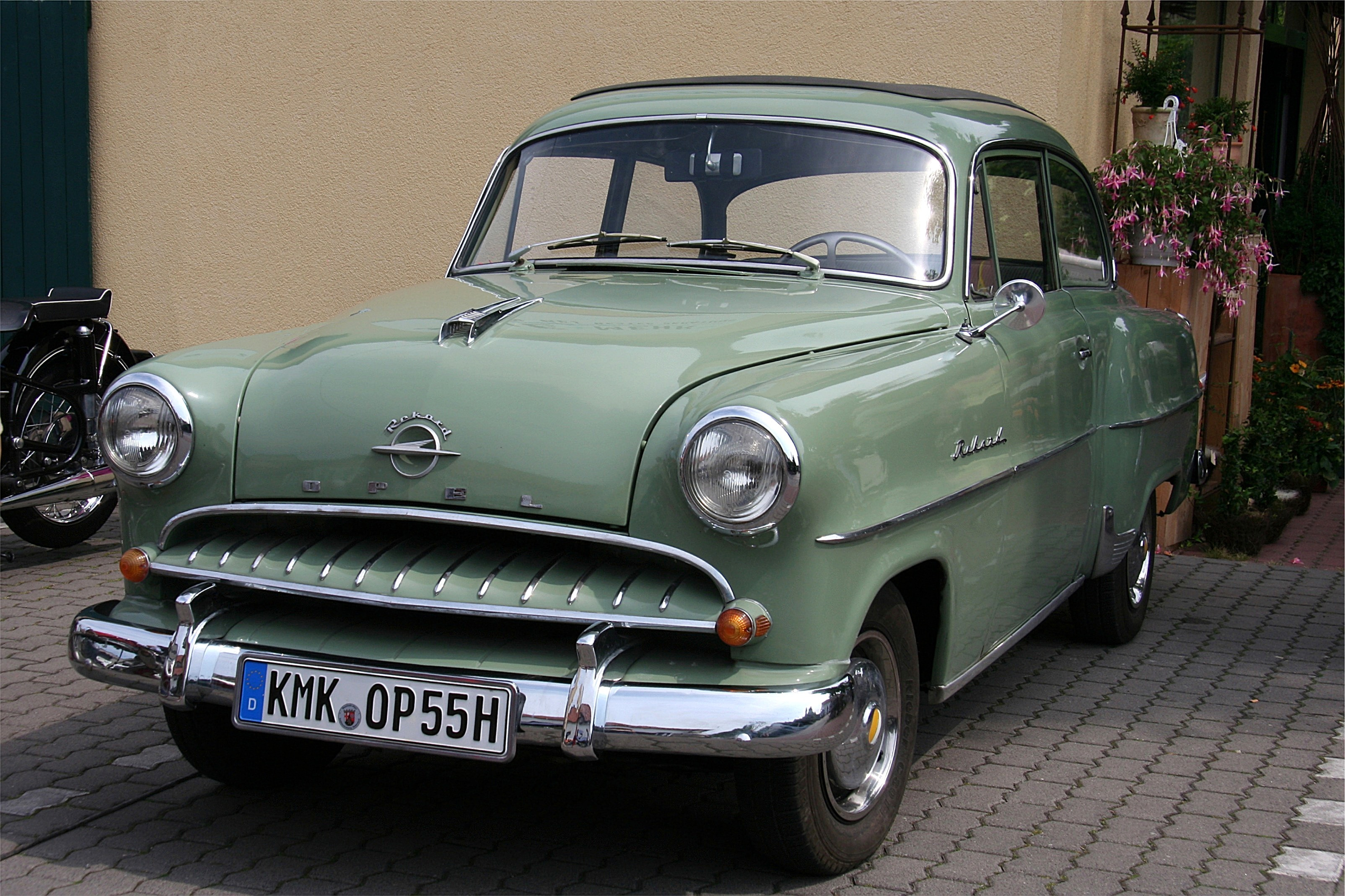

Overview
- Manufacturer: Opel (General Motors)
- Production: March 1953 – July 1957
- Assembly: Germany: Rüsselsheim; Cuba: Havana

Body and chassis
- Class: Family car (D)
- Body style: 2-door saloon 3-door estate 3-door van 2-door convertible

Powertrain
- Engine: 1488 cc I4 water-cooled
- Transmission: 3-speed manual

Chronology
- Predecessor: Opel Olympia
- Successor: Opel (Olympia) Rekord P1

The Opel Olympia Rekord is a two-door family car that replaced the Opel Olympia in March 1953 and was marketed through 1957.

Innovations included a modern Ponton-style body incorporating styling features from the United States, and the start of annual model year changes to exterior and interior trim.

== Name ==
The car kept the "Olympia" name applied in 1935 to its predecessor model in anticipation of the 1936 Olympic Games. That first Olympia was a defining model for Opel, featuring then-revolutionary unibody construction. With the German economy was on an upswing, General Motors expected to produce the cars in large volumes. The name "Rekord" was added in 1953 based on the theme of sporting success and reflected a spirit of optimism that the model's marketplace performance would validate.

== Background ==
Opel followed the design trends of its parent company, General Motors, by incorporating annual facelifts. The Opel Olympia Rekord featured new front grille design and trim modifications. The policy of annual facelifts ensured publicity, and the car was a commercial success. It achieved second place in the West German sales totals each year. The number one seller was the much smaller and less expensive Volkswagen Type 1. Around 580,000 Olympia Rekords were produced. Opel's executive, Edward Zdunek, explained the annual facelifts, stating they gave customers the possibility of "sozialen Differenzierung" (social differentiation). Commentators also noted that the yearly facelifts disadvantaged owners by depressing second-hand values for the Olympia Rekord. The Olympia Rekord set a pattern that Opel would follow for decades, providing more car for the money than other competing models.

The 1488 cc OHC four-cylinder water-cooled engine was changed little since it was introduced in the 1937 Opel Olympia. The 1953 version was rated at 40 PS (29 kW) at 3800 rpm. This was increased at the end of 1955 for the 1956 model year to 45 PS (33 kW) at 3900 rpm. A slight increase in maximum torque accompanied this, with the compression ratio going from 6.5:1 to 6.9:1. The 1950s was a decade during which minimum fuel octanes were raised progressively across Western Europe. However, "normal" grade fuel for the Olympia Rekord throughout its production.

=== 1953–1954 ===
The Opel Olympia Rekord was introduced with a new generously proportioned body and an old 1,488 cc engine in March 1953. The top seller was the two-door saloon. Starting in August 1953, Opel offered a two-door convertible ("Cabrio-Limouisine") priced an extra DM 300, but found few customers. Also available in August was a 3-door estate, which Opel branded as the Opel Olympia Rekord CarAVan. The "Caravan" name would be used on many subsequent Opel estate models.

The car's styling incorporated an "Americana flavour" that "was in tune with the times, rather than decreed" by the General" from corporate headquarters in Detroit. The Opel Olympia Record featured an open-mouthed front grille which reminded commentators of a shark's mouth (der "Haifischmaul-Kuehlergrill"). All the cars were delivered with their standard steel wheels painted black regardless of the colour of the car body. This cost-cutting approach provided sales opportunities for after-market wheel trims.

The advertised price in Germany was DM 6,410 for the two-door "Limousine" (sedan) and DM 6,710 for the "Cabrio-Limousine" and "Caravan" (estate). By July 1954, Opel had produced 113,966 "Limousine" (sedan) or "Cabrio-Limousine" Olympia Rekords along with 15,804 "Caravan" (estate) versions and 6,258 Olympia Rekord panel vans.

=== 1955 ===
Production of the first Olympia Rekord ended in July 1954, In late summer 1954, the mildly facelifted 1955 car was presented. The advertised power output of the 1,488 cc engine was unchanged at 40 PS (29 kW) despite a slight increase in the compression ratio from 6.3:1 to 6.5:1. The back window was enlarged and the front grille was modified. A single body-colored horizontal bar was incorporated across the previously open grille.

A new base model was offered at DM 5,850, which was DM 1,000 more than the market-leading Volkswagen Type 1. Opel's new entry-level family car also received a reduced name, being badged simply as the Opel Olympia. At the same time, the other models in the range continued with the Opel Olympia Rekord name. The 1955 model year also saw the introduction of a light panel van version.

=== 1956 ===
The 1956 model, introduced towards the end of 1955, featured simplified bumpers without the over-riders. The grille was now filled with tightly packed thin vertical bars.

Further price reductions followed the trend of other German auto-makers during the mid-1950s. The advertised German market price for the 1956 model ranged from 5,410 to DM 6,560. The 1,488 cc engine was also upgraded with an increased compression ratio to 6.9:1, and the advertised maximum power was increased to 45 PS (33 kW). In other respects, the engine was little changed.

In July 1956, the two-door cabriolet version was discontinued because of low demand.

=== 1957 ===
The 1957 model appeared in July 1956. The grille was again modified, the roof was slightly flattened, and the exterior acquired even more chrome embellishment. A new all-synchromesh gearbox was introduced.

German market advertised prices now stood between DM 5,510 and 6,560. By way of comparison, in 1957 Volkswagen reduced the price of their entry-level Volkswagen Type 1 to less than DM 4,000.

The Opel Olympia Rekord was superseded in August 1957 by the new, larger, and more highly styled Rekord P1, which was available in a four-door body style for the first time. The 1937 Opel Olympia engine would continue to power entry-level Opel Rekord models through 1965.

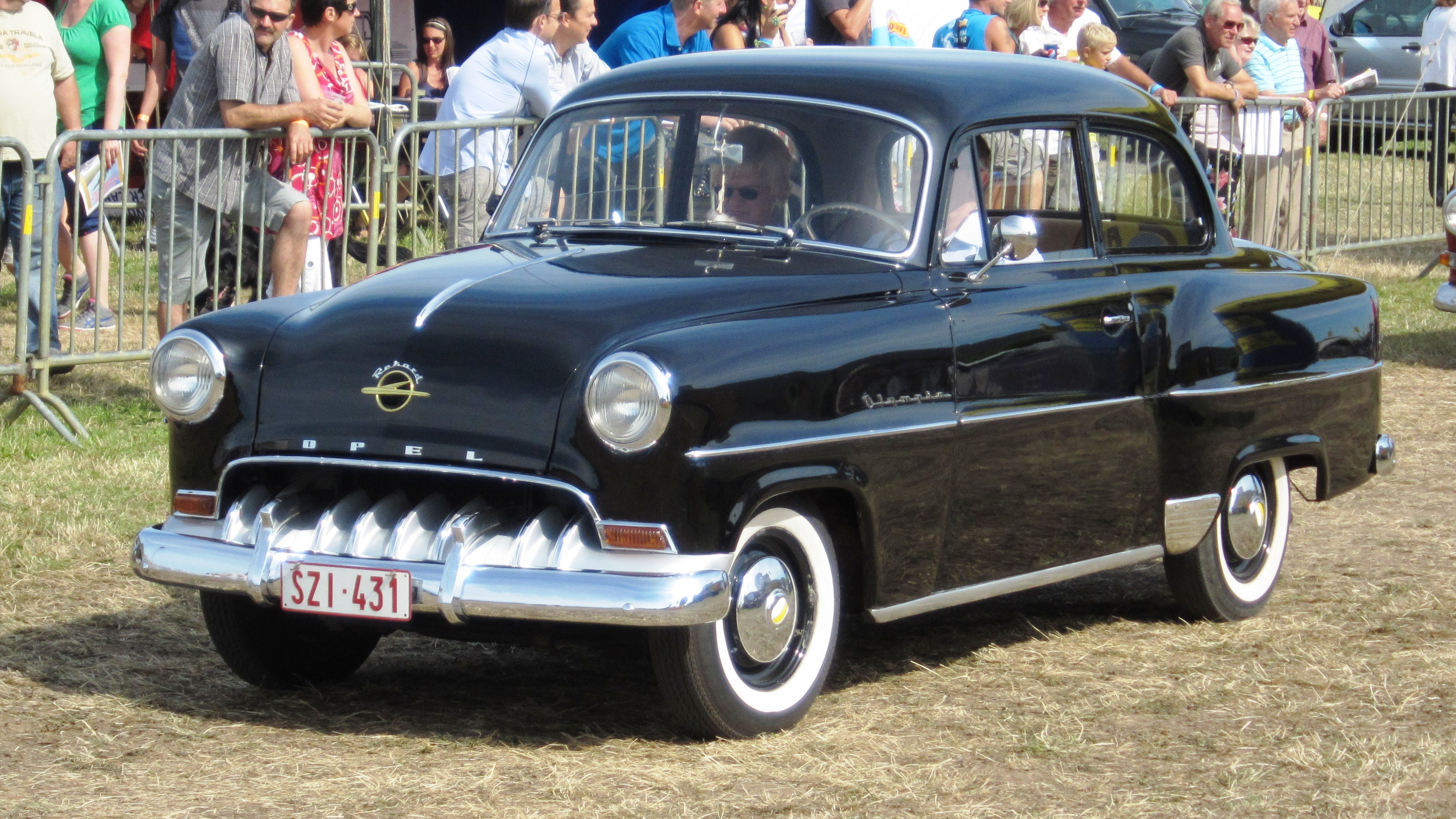
Opel Olympia Rekord (1953/54)

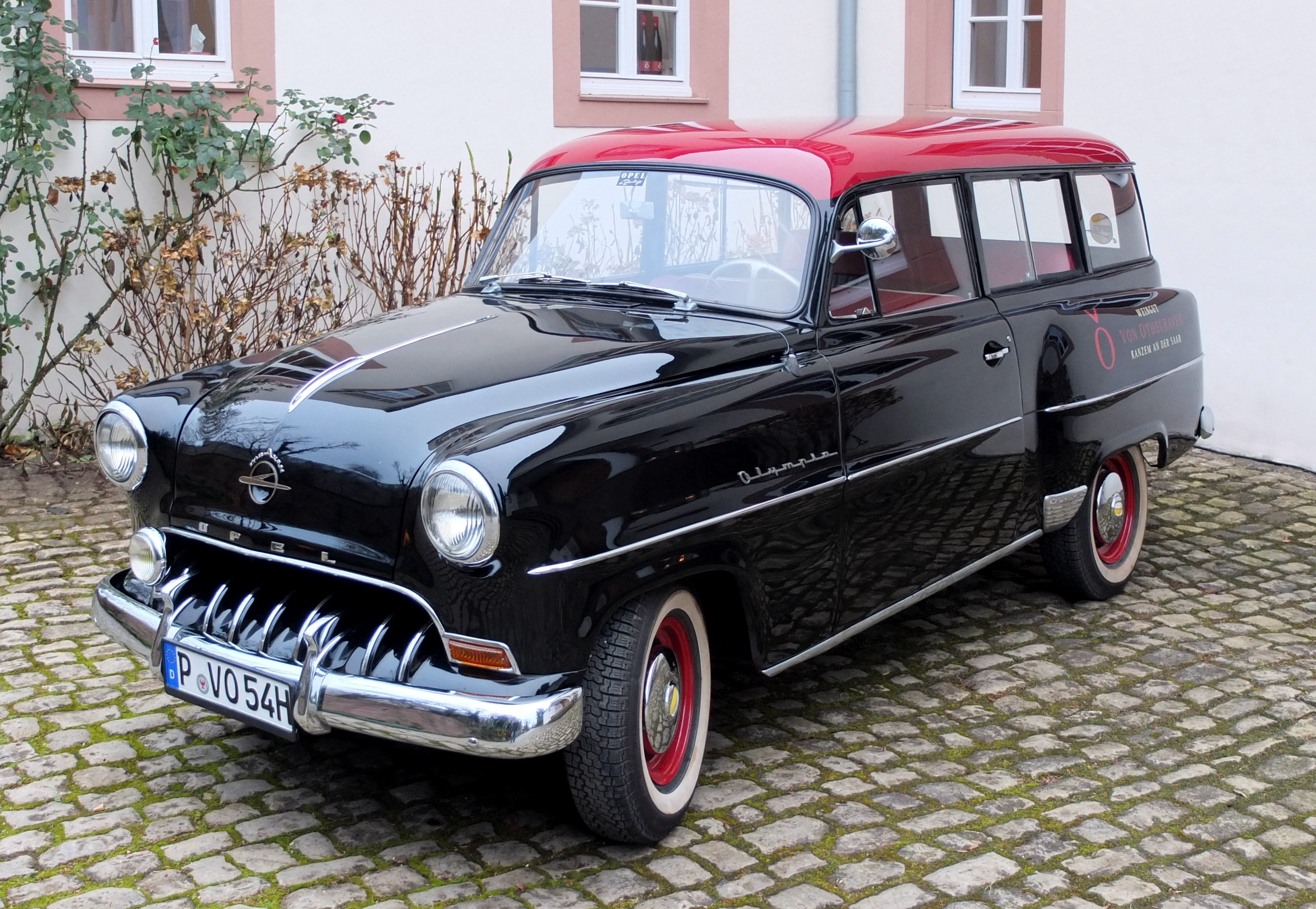
Opel Olympia Rekord Caravan (1954)

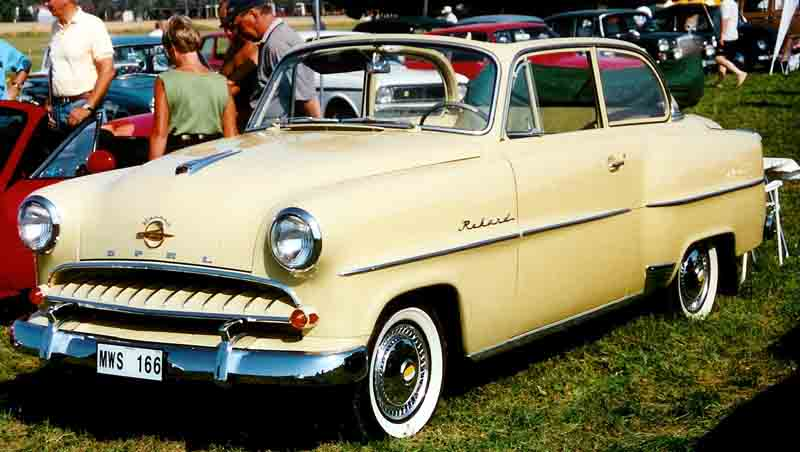
Olympia Rekord Cabriolimousine (1955)

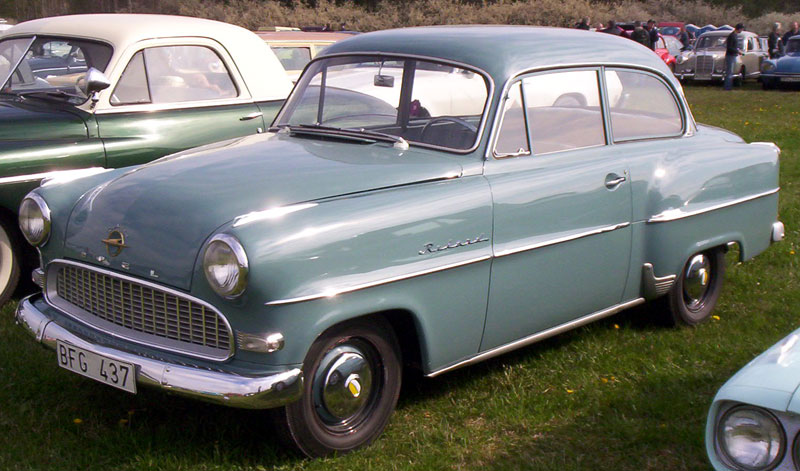
Olympia Rekord (1956)

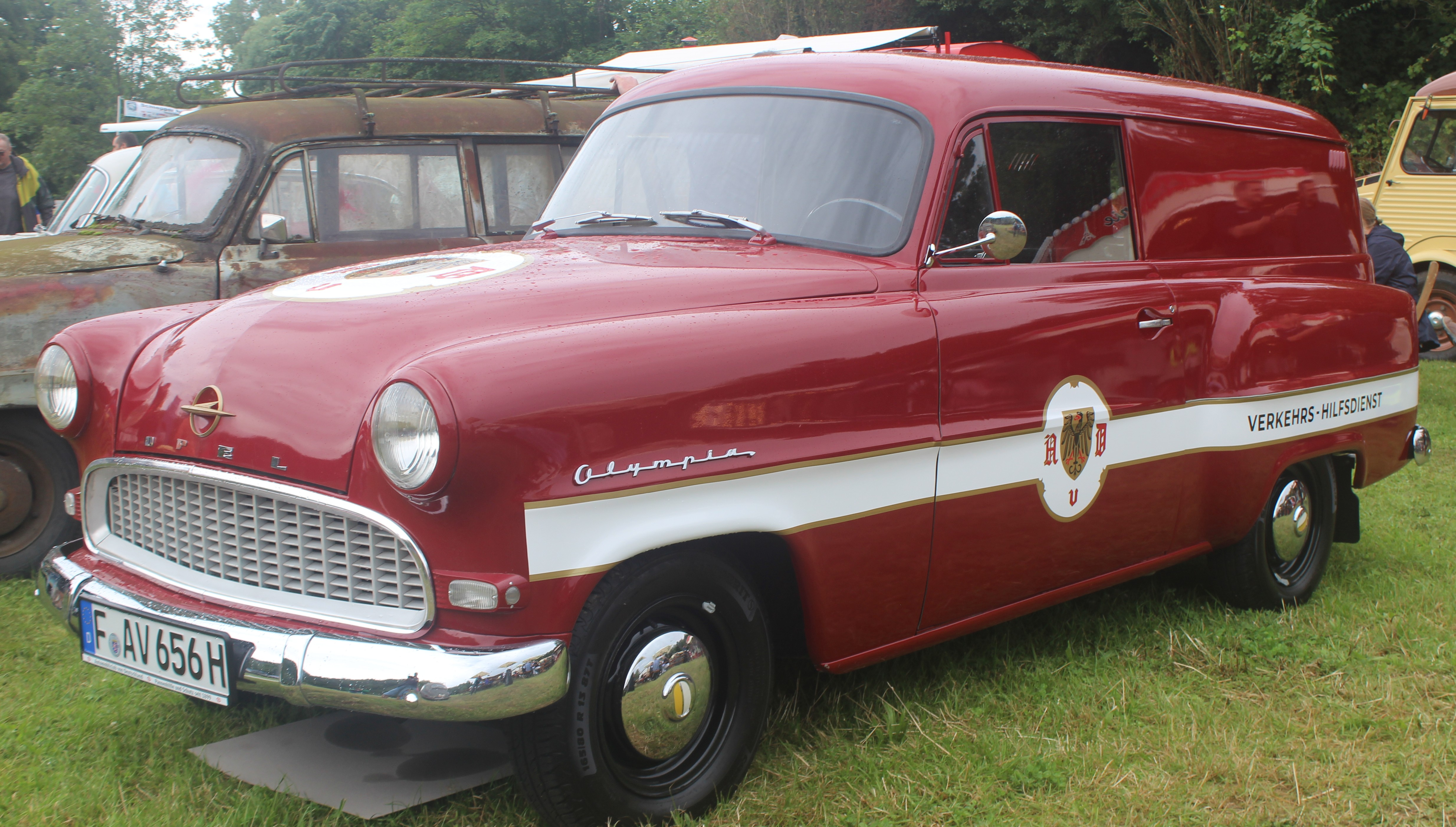
Olympia Rekord panel van (1956)

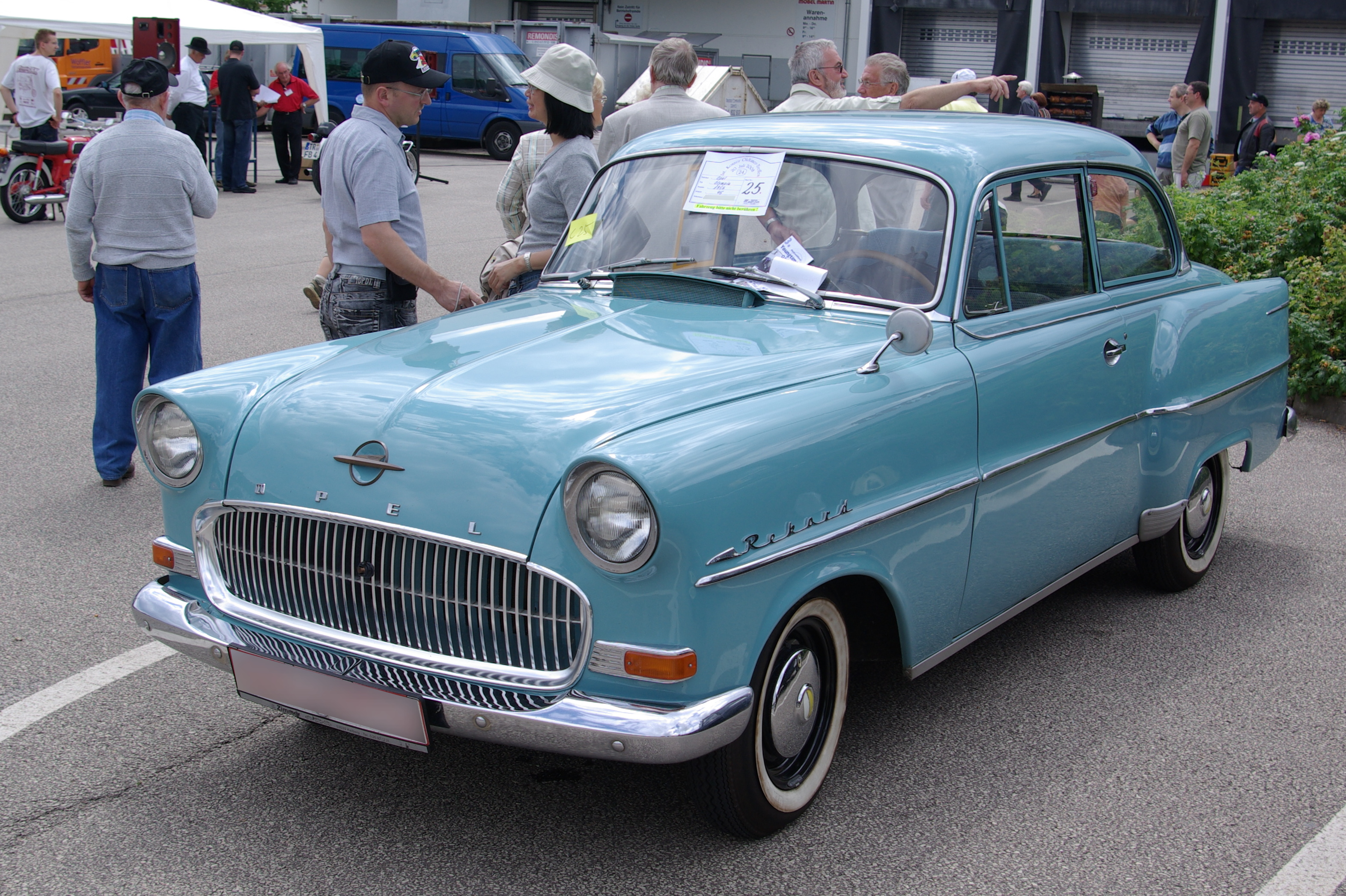
Olympia Rekord (1957)

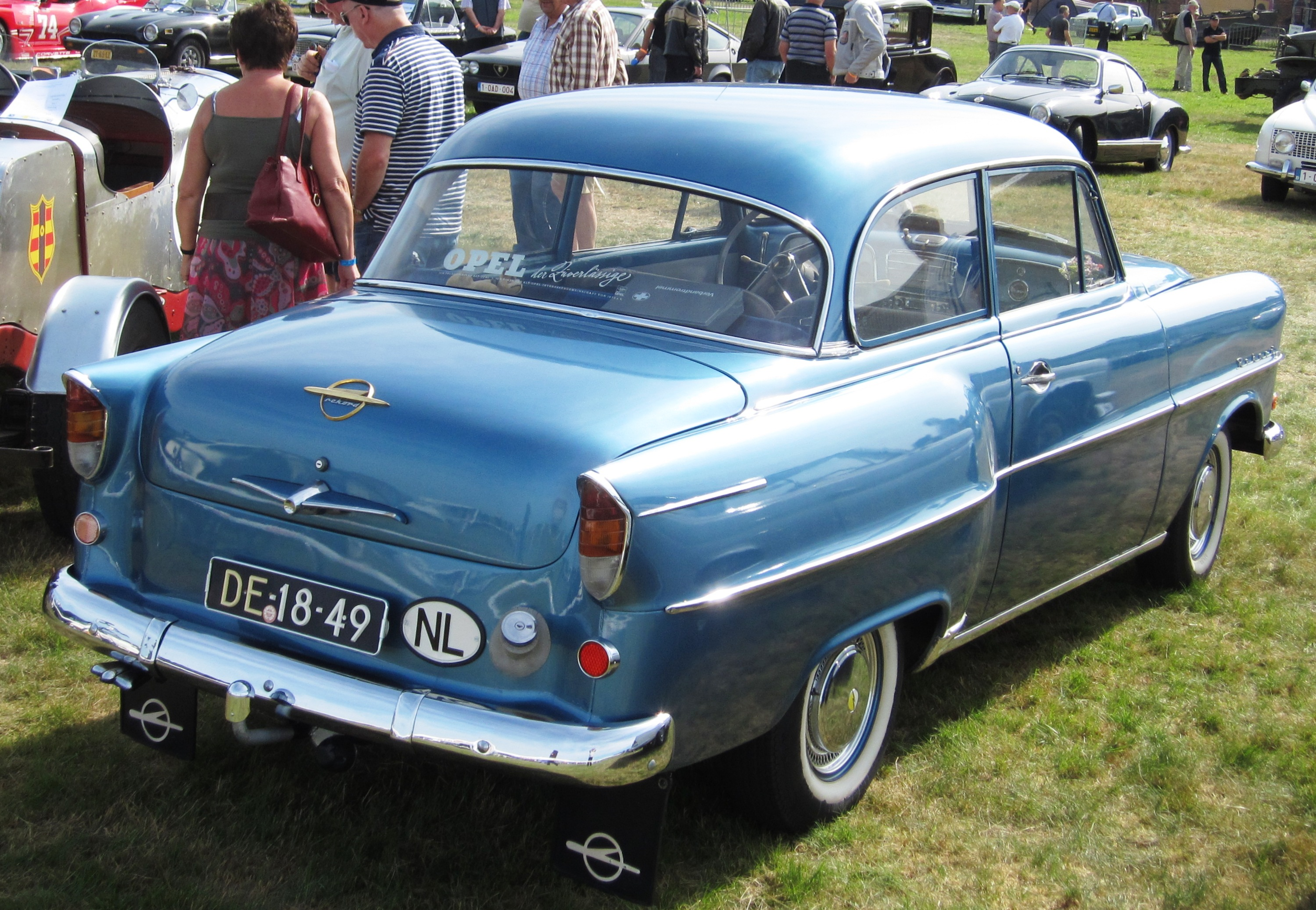
Olympia Rekord (1957)

== Production ==
During the four years between 1953 and 1957, Opel recorded production of 582,924 Olympia Rekords, with the rate accelerating markedly in 1957. It was produced at about half the rate of the Volkswagen Beetle. Still, it was repeatedly Germany's second best seller. It was the first of a long line of Opel models that would outsell competitor vehicles from Ford, both in Germany and in key European export markets.

During six years from 1952 until 1958, Ford recorded production of 564,863 Taunus 12Ms and 15Ms which were comparable to the middleweight Opel in many ways, though half a class down in terms of price and (at least in the case of the 12M version) power.

== Technical data ==
Opel Olympia Rekord 1953-1957
	1953/54	1954/55	1955/56	1956/57
Engine:	Four-stroke straight-four engine			
Bore × Stroke:	80 mm × 74 mm (3.1 in × 2.9 in)			
Displacement:	1,488 cc (90.8 cu in)			
Maximum power:	40 PS (29 kW) at 3800 rpm		45 PS (33 kW) at 3900 rpm	
Maximum torque:	94 N⋅m (69 lb⋅ft) at 1900 rpm	98 N⋅m (72 lb⋅ft) at 2300 rpm		
Compression ratio:	6.3:1	6.5:1	6.9:1	
Fuel feed:	Opel downdraft carburetor (licensed from Carter) with 30 mm Ø			
Valvetrain:	Two overhead valves per cylinder, cam-in-block, rocker arms and pushrods			
Cooling:	Water-cooled			
Transmission:	3–speed manual, column shift			
Front suspension:	Double wishbones, coil springs			
Rear suspension:	Live axle, semi-elliptical leaf springs			
Brakes:	Hydraulically activated drum brakes, Ø 200 mm (Caravan rear 230 mm)			
Body and chassis:	Steel unibody chassis with steel body			
Track front/rear:	1,200 / 1,268 mm (47.2 / 49.9 in)			
Wheelbase:	2,487 mm (97.9 in)			
Length:	4,210–4,245 mm (165.7–167.1 in) (Caravan: 4,230–4,260 mm (166.5–167.7 in))			
Unladen weight:	920–930 kg (2,030–2,050 lb) (Caravan: 1,000 kg (2,200 lb))			
Top speed:	118–122 km/h (73–76 mph)			
0–100 km/h:	35–40 s		30–35 s	26–30 s
Fuel consumption (Regular grade fuel):	10.0–10.5 l/100 km 28.2–26.9 mpg_{‑imp}; 23.5–22.4 mpg_{‑US}			9.5–10.5 l/100 km 29.7–26.9 mpg_{‑imp}; 24.8–22.4 mpg_{‑US}
Advertised starting price (DM):	6,410	5,850	5,410	5,510

== See also ==
- Opel Rekord

== Sources ==
- "Auto- und Motorrad-Welt," Deutscher Sportverlag Kurt Stoof, Köln, Heft 6/1953
- Arthur Westrup: Meine Erfahrungen mit dem Opel-Olympia Rekord 58 (= Meine Erfahrungen mit dem ...., Band 8). Bielefeld: Delius, Klasing 1958, 47 Seiten.
- Oswald, Werner (2003). Deutsche Autos 1945-1990, Band (vol) 3 (in German). Motorbuch Verlag. ISBN 3-613-02116-1.
