= Landau (automobile) =

Type of car design derived from an earlier Landau carriage form

The Landau began as a carriage design with a folding fabric top consisting of two sections supported by external elliptical springs. This landau roof design was adopted in early automobiles as a convertible top. The term, however, came to mean a simulated convertible. A landau bar is an ornamental feature located on a car's c-pillar derived from the roof form, primarily used on hearses.

The Nash Rambler Landau introduced in 1950 is a cabrio coach with a power-operated fabric top. Ford used Landau as a model or trim name for several closed versions of the Thunderbird.

== Origins ==
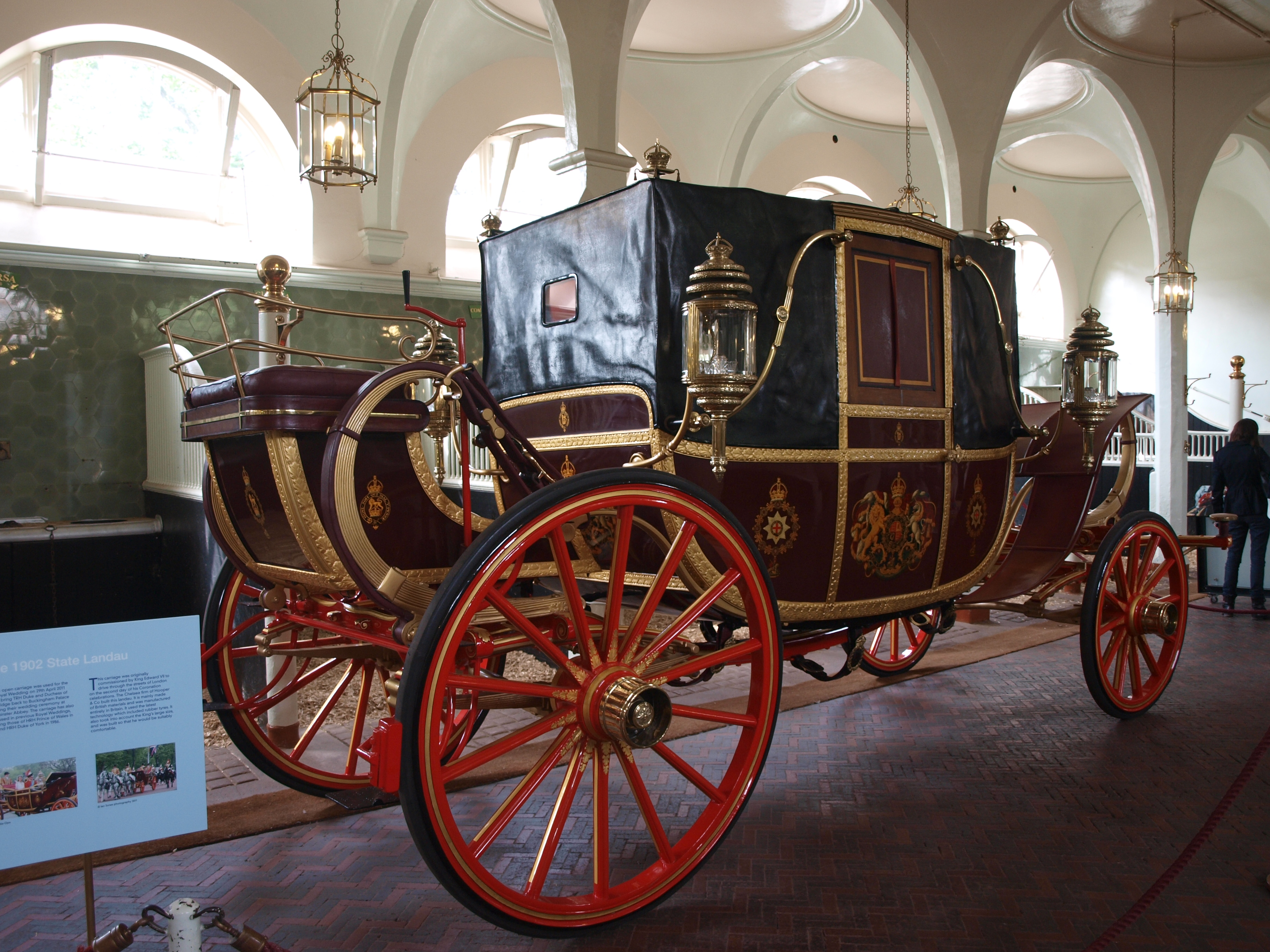
1902 State landau closed, London, England.

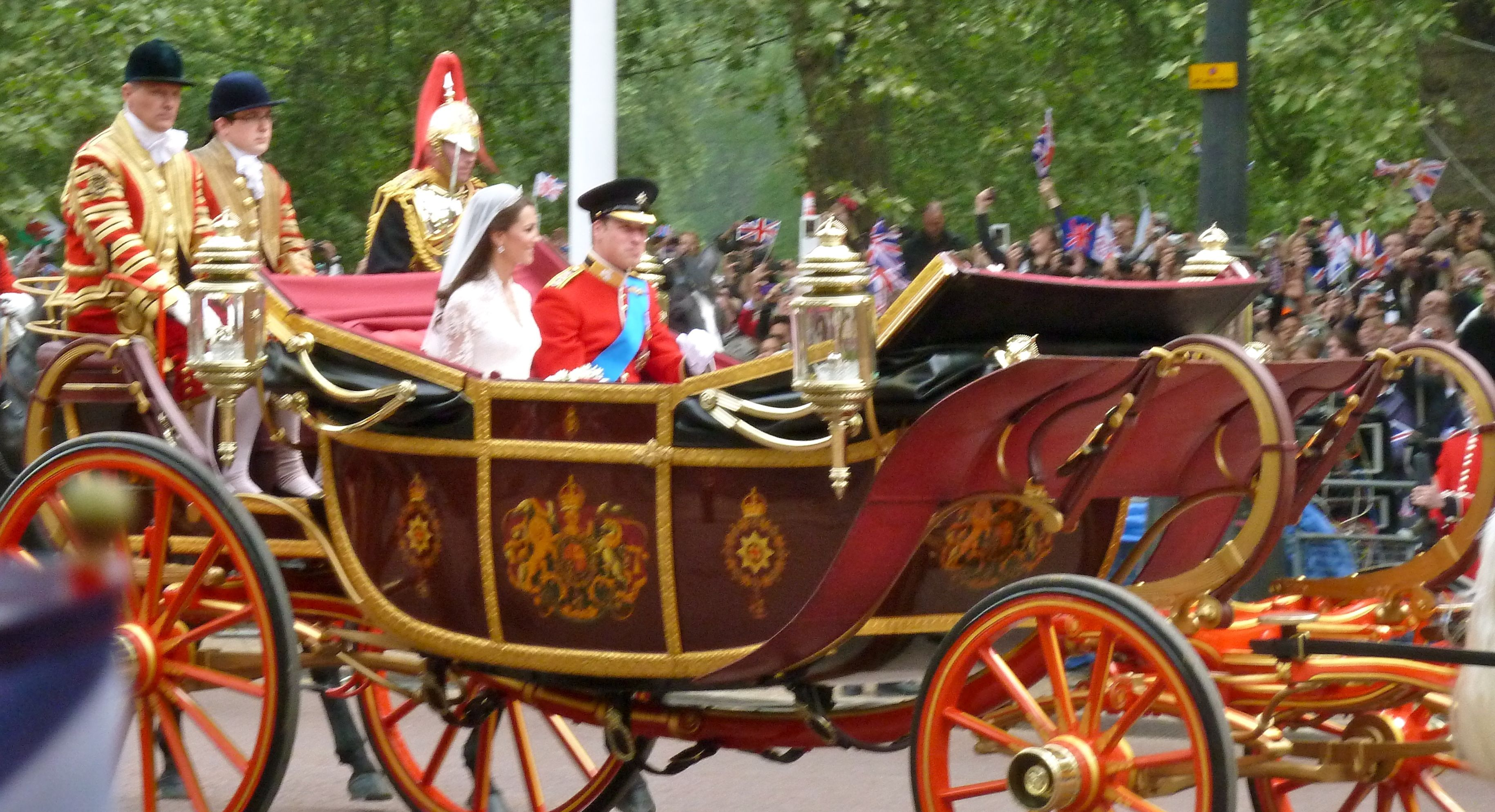
1902 State landau open, London, England, 2011. The leather roof is folded down

Carriages that had a leather top that could be lowered and raised were named "Landau" carriages after the city of Landau in Germany, where convertible carriages were first produced. Thrupp reports that they were first made in 1757 and that initially the hood at each end did not collapse completely but only fell back 45°, leaving the doors standing. Later, the whole structure was made to fold away completely in two halves, including the upper parts of the doorframe and the roof above the doors.

True landau carriages are most often seen in use fully open, when they resemble a barouche. When closed, their ends are vertical with a horizontal roof, as in a coach.

The term "landau" was first extended to all carriages with vis-à-vis seating and folding hoods at each end and then to automobiles of this form. Such vehicles were produced towards the end of the nineteenth century powered by:

- electricity: Walter Bersey's electric landau, which he drove in the 1896 Emancipation Run from London to Brighton.
- petrol: Benz's 1897 6 hp Landau
- steam: Clarkson's 1899 steam landau (with the driver behind the suspended carriage).

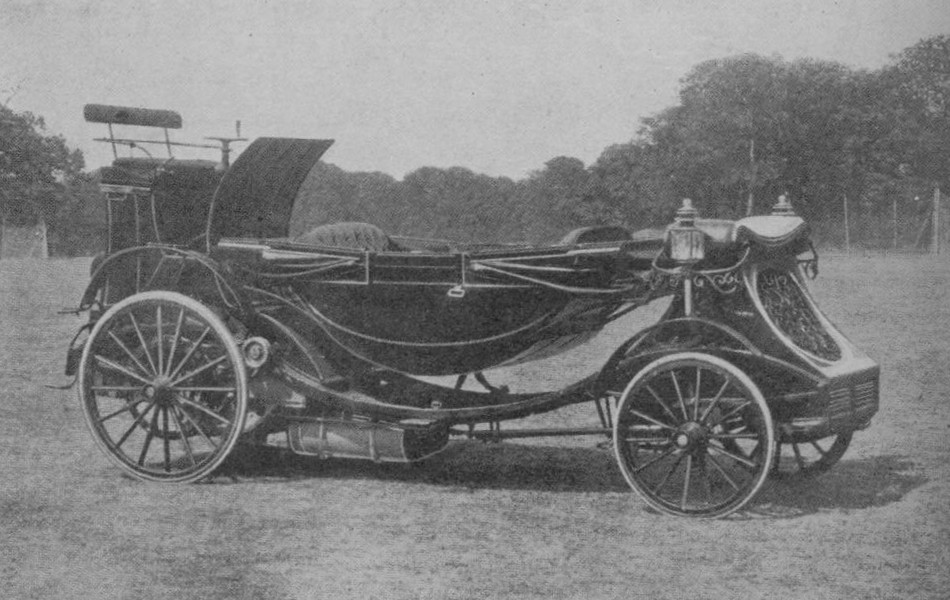
Clarkson Steam Landau at Richmond Park, England, June 1899

After 1900 the vis-à-vis format fell out of use for automobiles as drivers came to expect an unobstructed view forward. Automobiles adopted the landaulet (half-landau), in which the only opening hood covered the passenger compartment at the rear; this could contain folding rear-facing occasional seats.

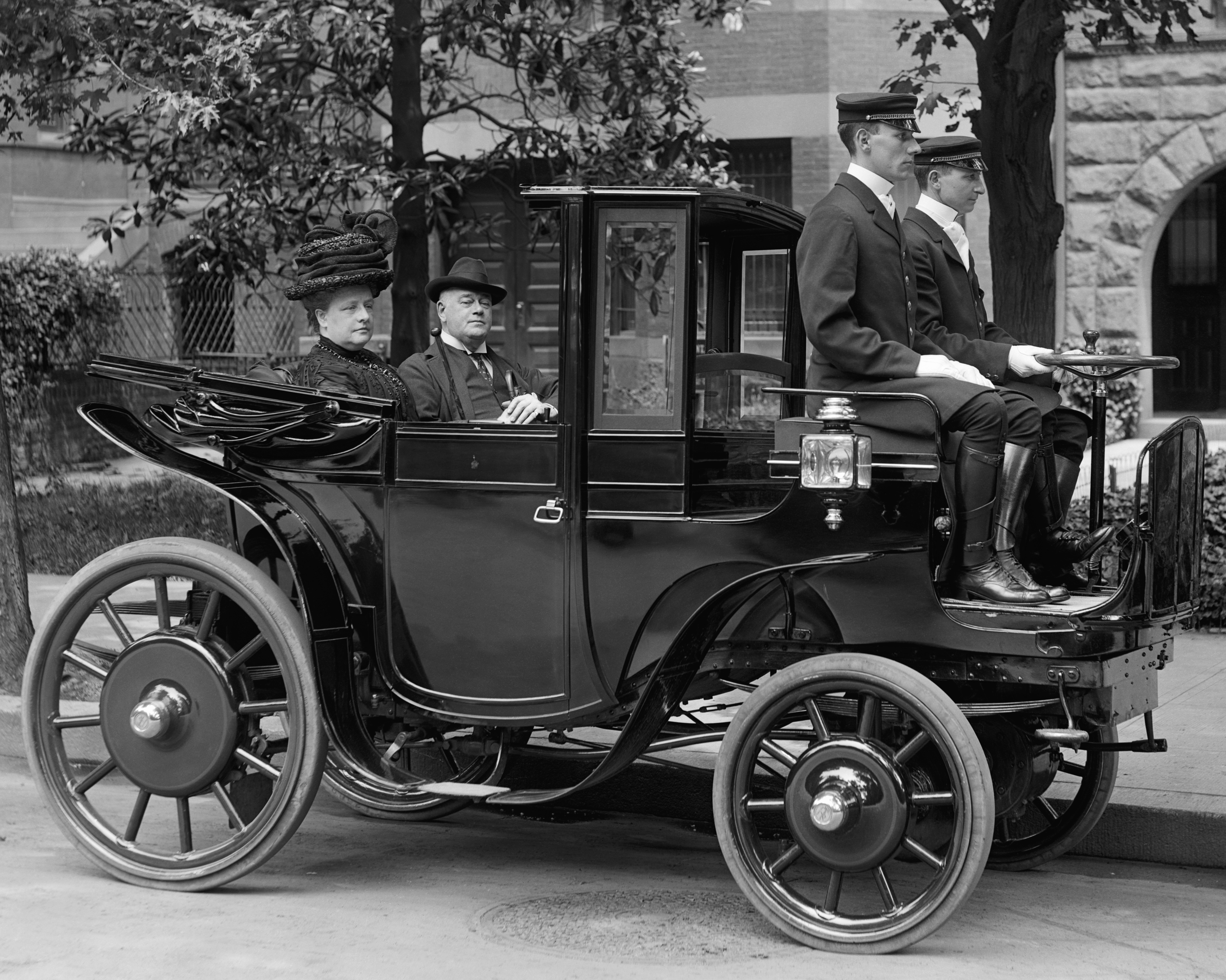
Senator Wetmore of Rhode Island in a Kriéger electric landaulette, c.1906

The 1935 handbook of the Society of Automotive Engineers defines the landau as "a closed-type body with provision for opening or folding the rear quarter, by the use of landau joints," and this usually makes it impossible to include quarter glass.

== Simulated convertible vinyl tops ==
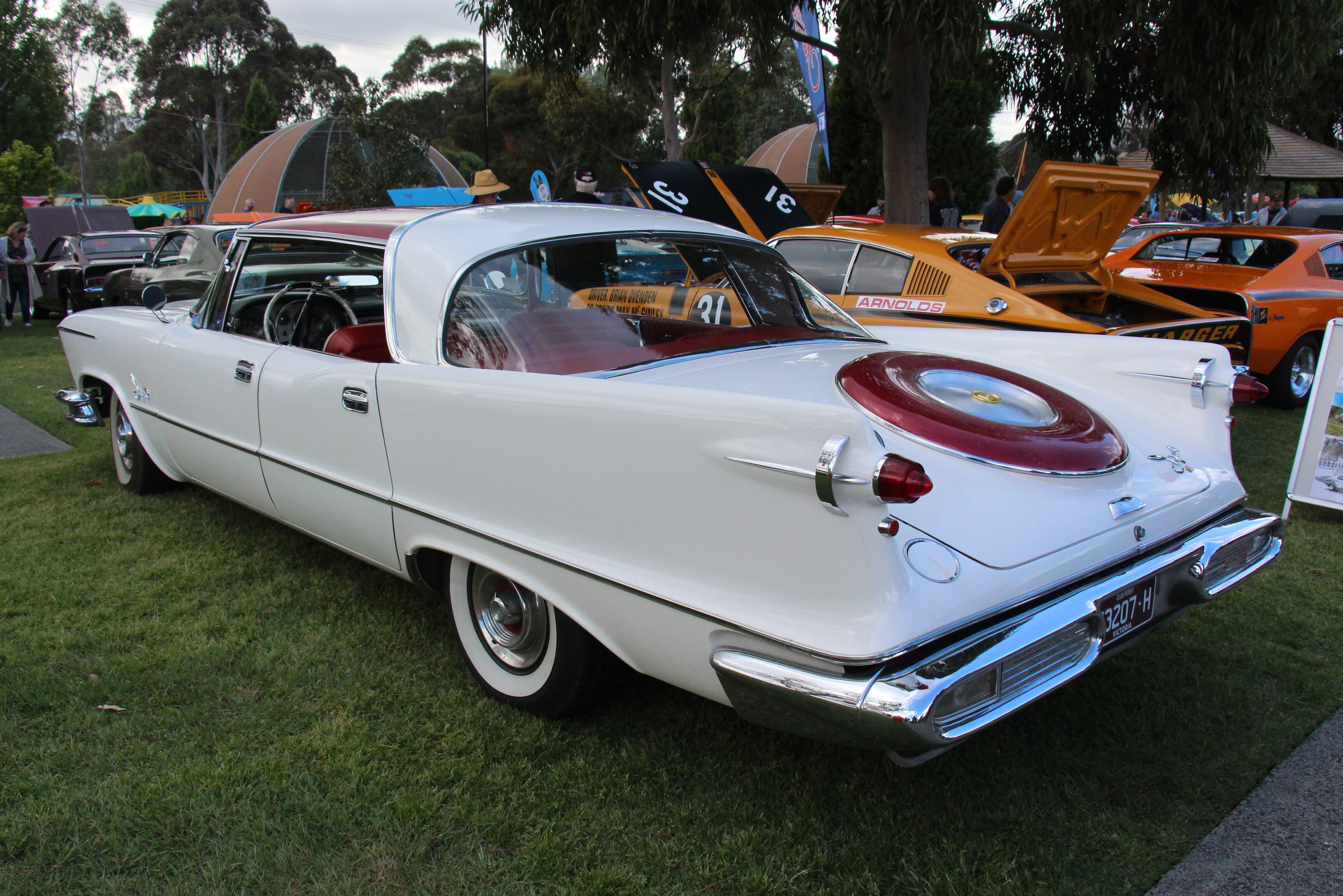
1957 Imperial four-door hardtop "landau-type" roof design

In the 1920s and 1930s, especially in the United States, "landau" became associated with cars where the fixed (e.g., metal) roof and rear quarter panels were covered with fabric or leather and fitted with S-shaped side landau bars, to make it appear like a convertible roof.

Following the 1920s and 1930s, when custom-built bodies were available with a split front and rear roof design, the use of landau changed from a functional feature on limited production cars to a decorative feature in some higher market segment production cars.

The term landau fell into disuse from the mid-1940s until the late-1950s. It was used to describe fixed-roof cars styled to simulate a two-piece roof or to resemble convertibles, sometimes using vinyl roofs. An example of a two-piece roof is the 1957 Imperial four-door hardtop with a simulated "landau-type" roof design. Some models were called "landaus" by their manufacturers, and many were fitted with landau bars on the rear quarters (faux cabriolet).

By the early 1970s, the landau term became a shorthand for premium models with luxury trim for personal luxury two-door cars, top-of-the-line sedans. A popular styling enhancement was a vinyl cover over the rear section of the roof called a landau roof. The landau roof design was featured on automobiles in all market segments, including subcompacts, pony cars, and four-wheel-drive. Also available was the opposite, a vinyl covering the forward section of the roof and also named a "Landau" vinyl roof. Chevrolet named the downsized Caprice two-door sedan featuring this design with a distinct wraparound rear window as the Landau. Cadillac offered a full factory landau roof with optional simulated landau bars for the Fleetwood Series 75 limousine. The last American automobiles to offer a factory-installed landau (padded vinyl) roofs were the 1996 Cadillac Fleetwood and 1996 Buick Roadmaster sedans.

Landau vinyl tops have disappeared from automobiles, but landau bars on the sides of hearses continue to be a design element. In the 2020s, neo-landau bars have returned to "provide some bit of visual interest on an otherwise boring expanse of D-pillar area" with the landau bar characteristic diagonal/S-shaped shape distilled and minimized.

== Landau bar ==
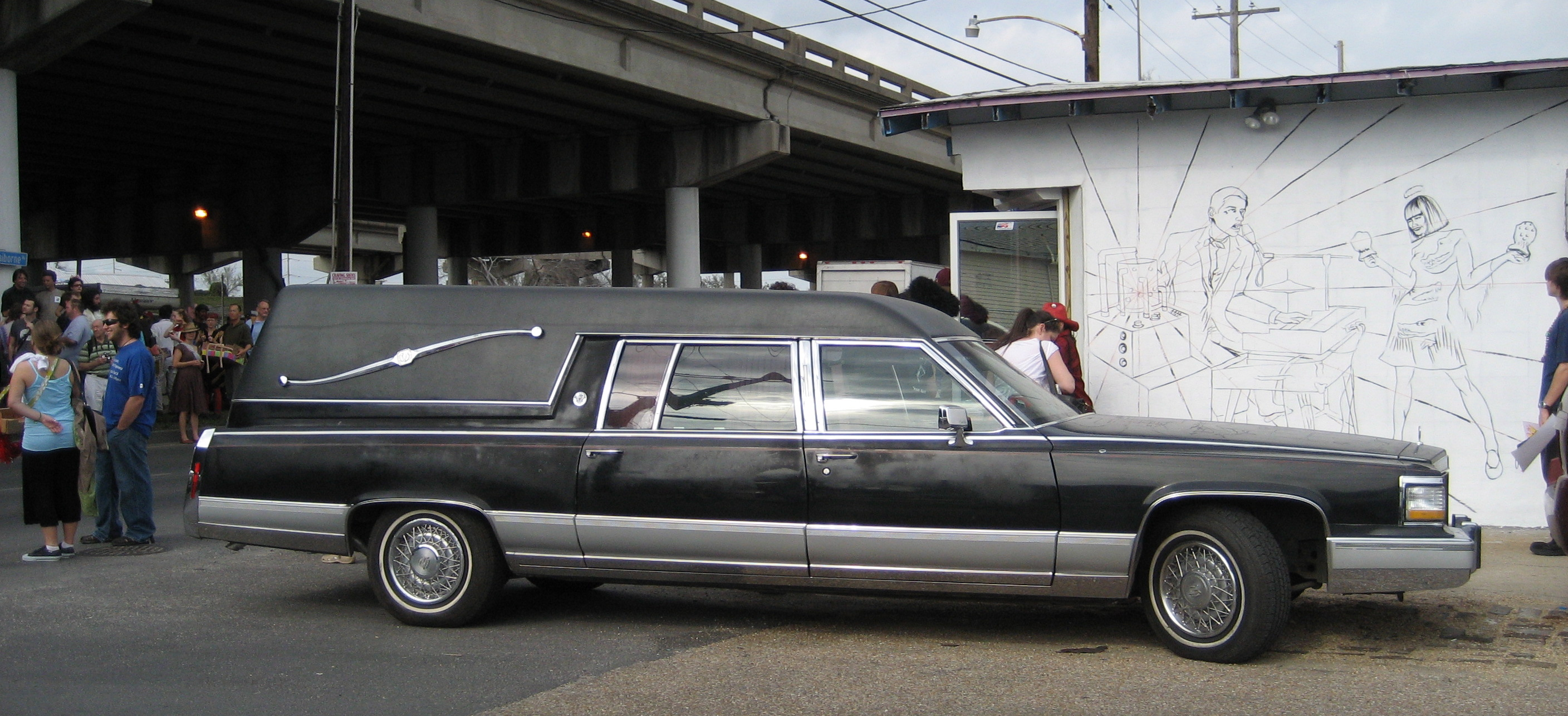
Landau bar on the rear quarter panel of a Cadillac hearse

A landau bar is an ornamental S-shaped metallic bar installed on the rear quarter panel of a car. Mostly used on hearses, the landau bar is skeuomorphic and represents the folding roof structure on a Landau carriage.

The early horse-drawn hearses were horse-drawn carriages that had fully functional landau bars to open and close the fabric roof. As automobile-based hearses became popular, they "borrowed the landau bar flourish as an homage and an attempt to add a touch of Old-World class."

Since the mid-1940s, hearses in the United States commonly feature chrome bow-shaped landau bars on the simulated leather-covered rear roof sides. The landau bars have become a symbol of a funeral car to the point that hearse manufacturers continue to add them to "limousines as a matter of tradition."

Ford included simulated landau bars on the highest trim versions of the Thunderbird beginning in 1962. Although the landau bar had become excessively gaudy trim on most passenger cars since the 1970s, there is an apparent return in the 2020s with "neo-landau bars" on some Genesis, Lexus, and Jeep SUV models. The objective is to "provide some bit of visual interest on an otherwise boring expanse of D-pillar area." These landau bar-type ornamentations are slimmer and also integrate into the bodyside brightwork.

== Nash Rambler Landau ==
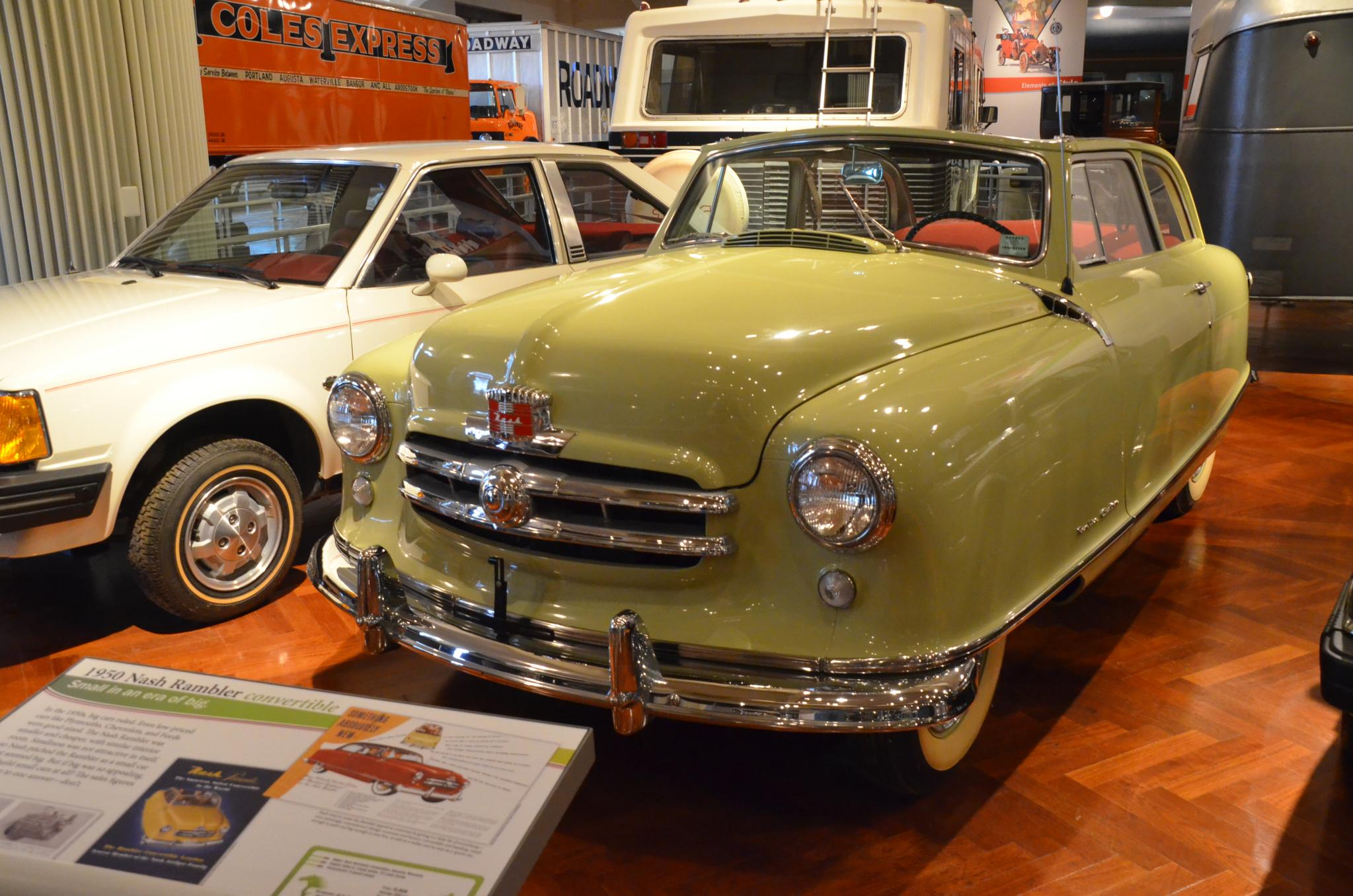
1951 Nash Rambler Landau

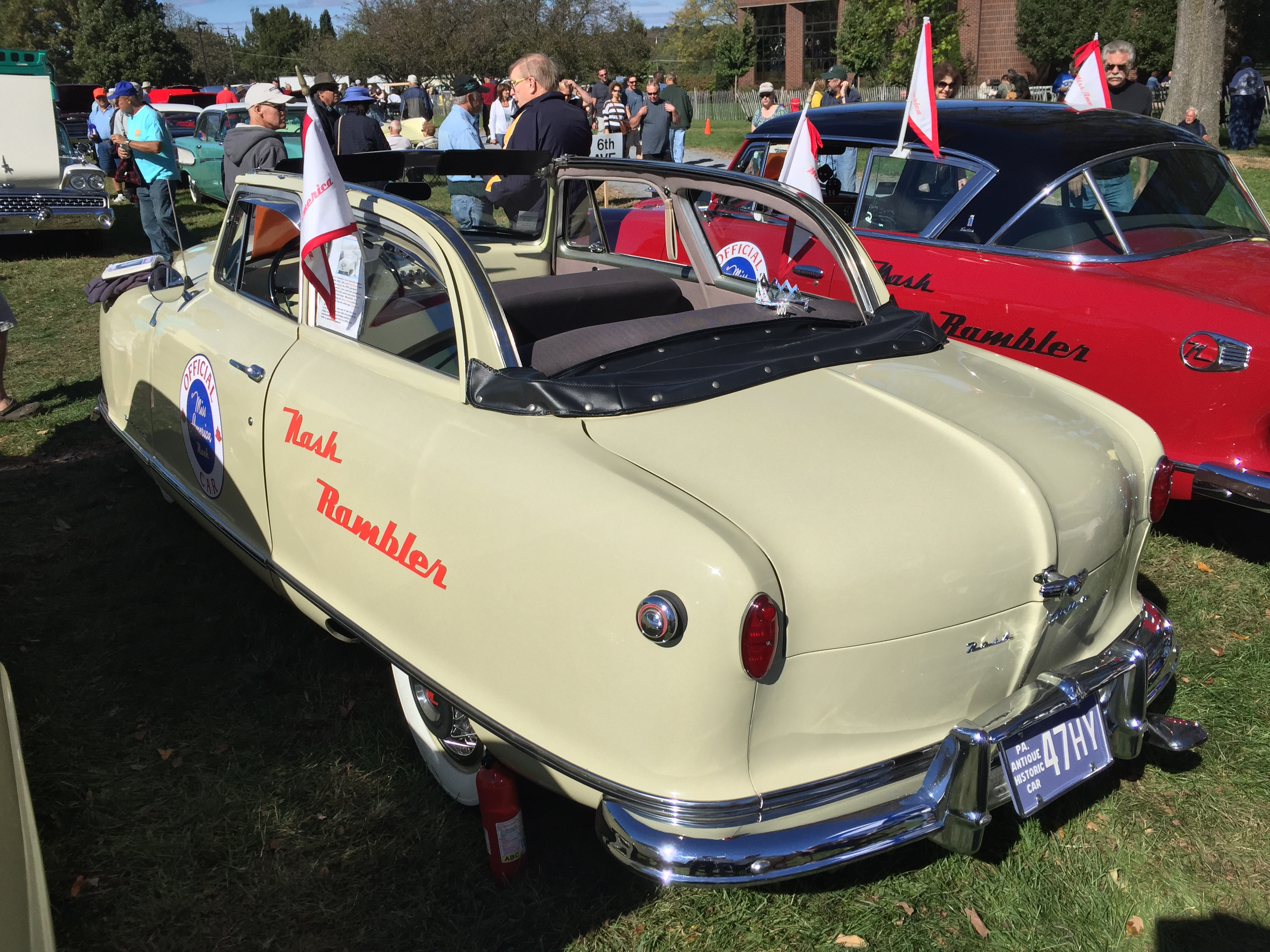
1951 Nash Rambler Landau

On 10 April 1950, Nash Motors introduced the Rambler, a "Euro-style" convertible. It was "the first true compact car of the post-World War II era" in a two-door cabrio coach body style called the "Nash Rambler Landau" achieving sales success "when big was better among most U.S. automakers." It was small and "cute enough" to make it successful despite being available in only one body style and having a high price.

This model was described as a "convertible landau". The roof section from the top of the windscreen could be retracted into the trunk/boot. A "bridge beam" steel structure remained in place at the top of the doors and side windows. This girder-like body design provided strength to support the car upside down as well as accommodate the overhead rails for the retracting top.

No other convertible featured anything like the Nash Rambler Landau with the fabric top that slid back to open along the fixed side rails. The fabric top was power-operated with a cover that could be snapped on when the top was open. The Rambler's strong body structure eliminated the internal bracing that was normally needed on other open roof cars.

The Landau model was discontinued at the end of the 1954 model year as demand for the soft top declined in favor of the more practical hardtop, sedan, and station wagon body styles that were added to the compact Nash Rambler line.

== Ford Thunderbird Landau ==
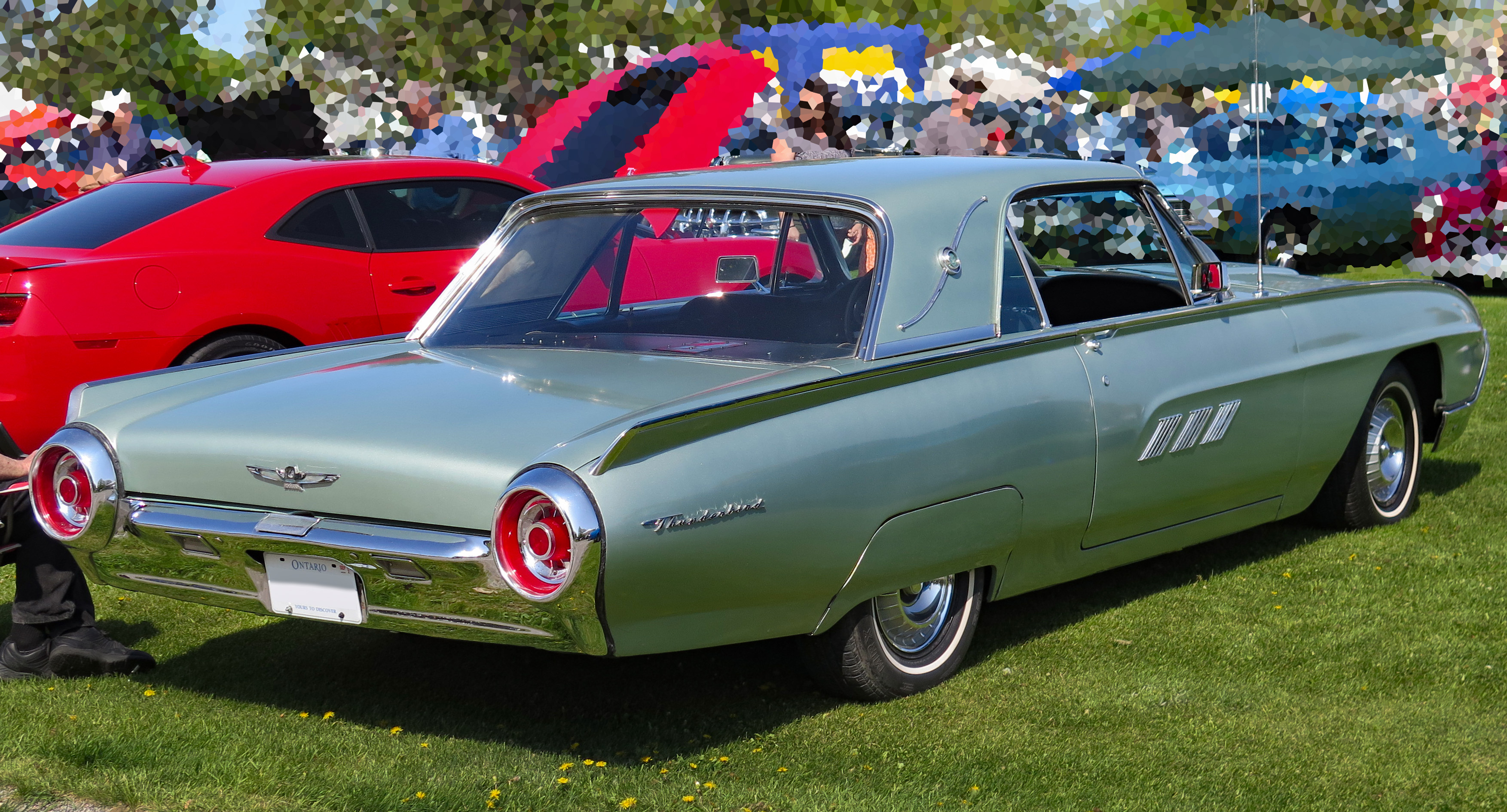
1963 Ford Thunderbird Landau

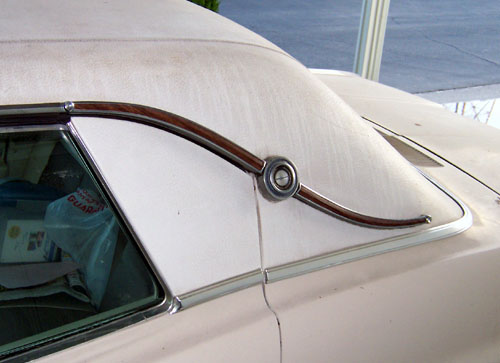
Simulated landau bar (with a faux landau joint in the center) on the C-pillar of a 1967 Ford Thunderbird

Ford marketed versions of the Ford Thunderbird using Landau as a model name. The 1962 Landau was a hardtop that included a padded vinyl roof in white or black with simulated S-bars with a raised wing Thunderbird emblem on the C-pillars. This model was popular and contributed to increased sales.

The "Town Landau" model was a model of the 1966 Thunderbird line. It featured a wide rear C-pillar with no rear quarter windows with a painted roof or available with a vinyl-covered roof that came in black, white, parchment, or sage gold and included color-coordinated S-bars.

The Thunderbird was redesigned for 1967 and included a four-door sedan body design with rear-hinged (suicide) doors. All four-door models included a vinyl roof and landau bars giving them the official name of "Landau Sedan". The C-pillar was visually extended into the rear door window area and covered to match the vinyl top, with the landau bars helping camouflage the cut line. The simulated landau design with overwrought trim on the four-door model has been described as "a one-car funeral procession".

The Town Landau two-door version was reintroduced as a mid-1977 model as the most luxurious Thunderbird that included many standard comfort and trim features. It did not have any simulated landau bars, only the "Town Landau" name in script etched on the opera windows. This top version continued to be marketed for through the 1979 model year.

== See also ==
- Landaulet
