= Cabrio coach =

Car with a retractable textile roof

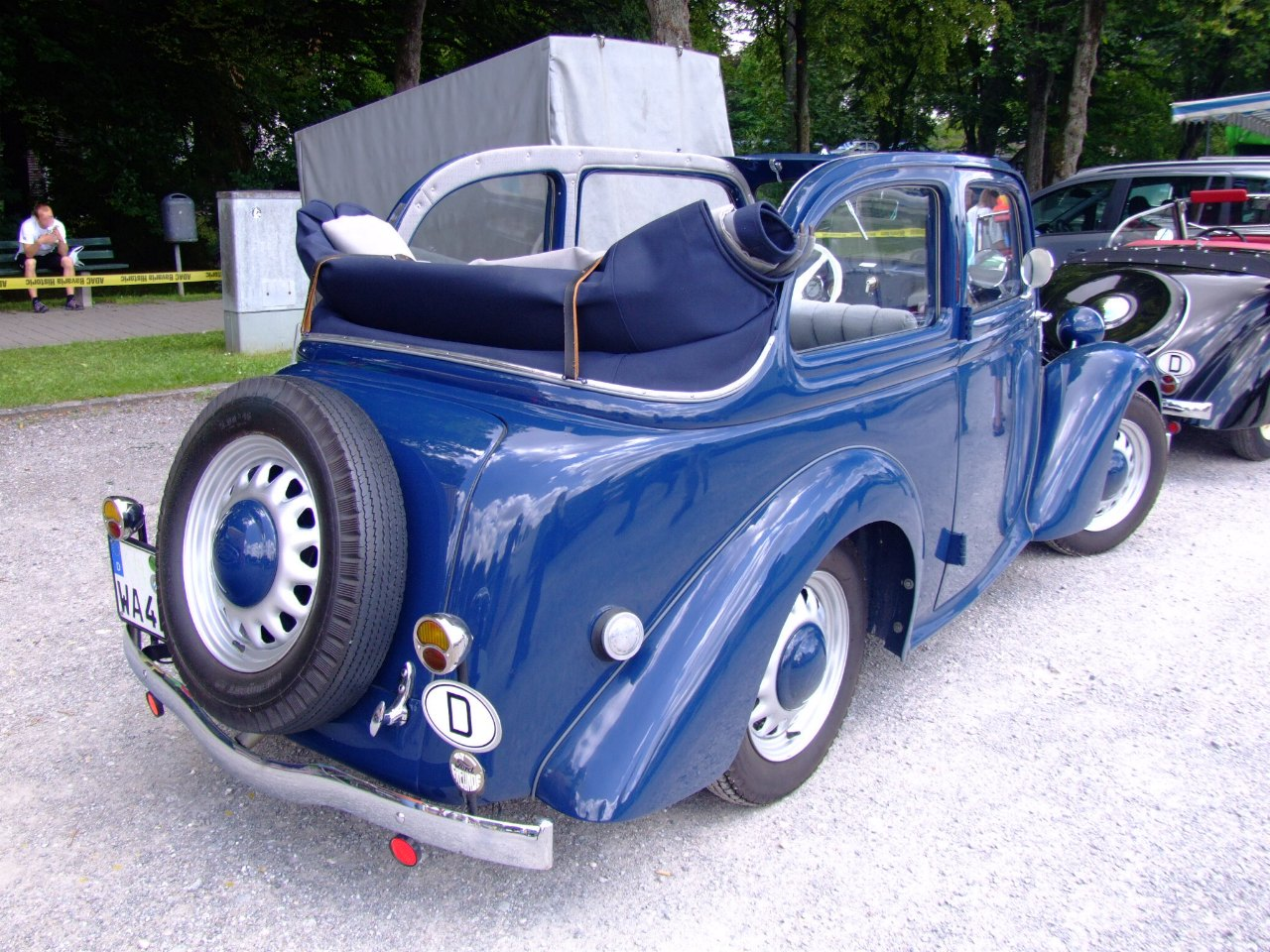
A Ford Eifel cabrio coach

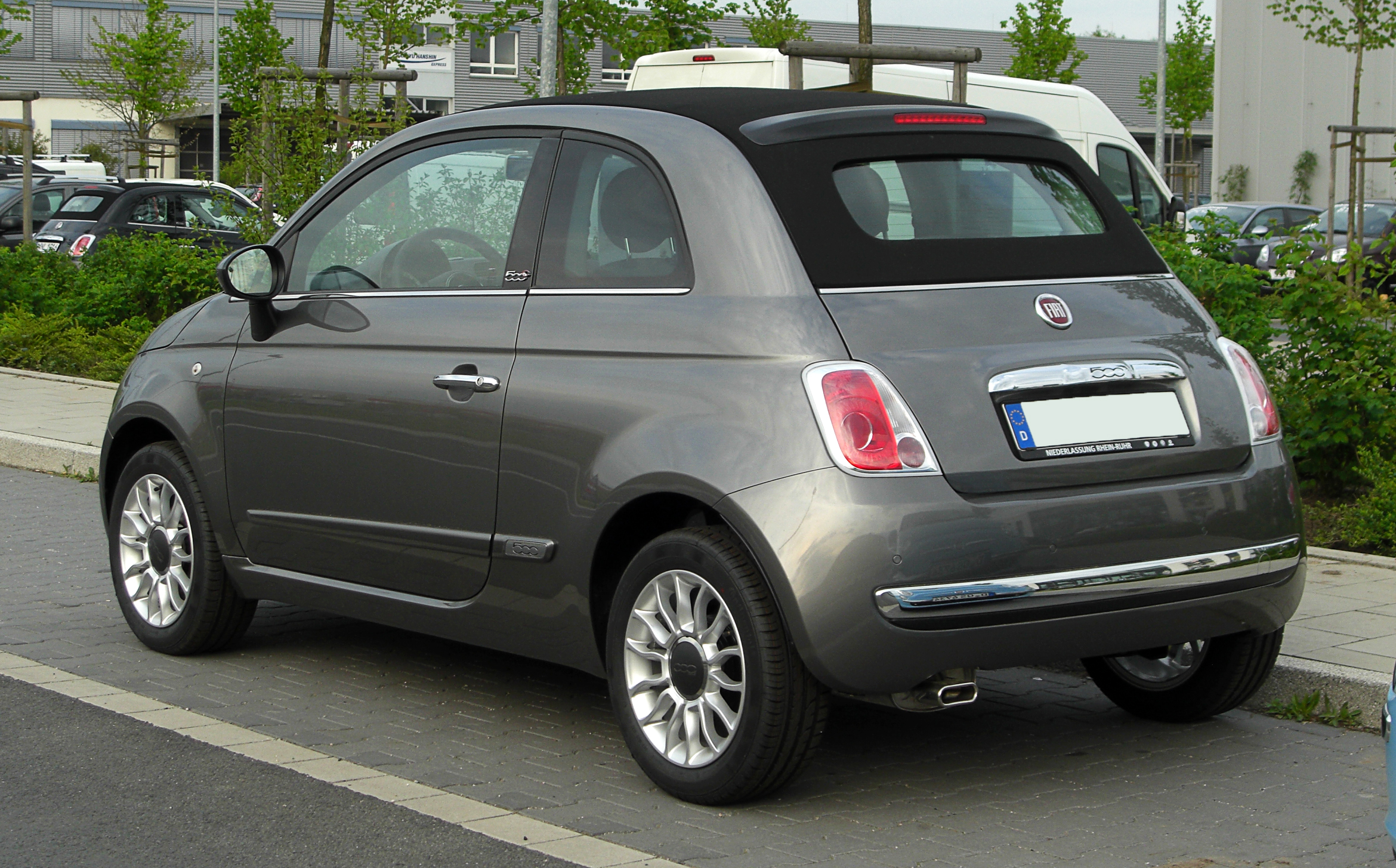
A modern example, a Fiat 500 (2007)

A cabrio coach or semi-convertible is a type of car that has a retractable textile roof, similar to a convertible/cabriolet. The difference is that where a convertible often has the B-pillar, C-pillar and other bodywork removed, the cabrio coach retains all bodywork to the top of the door frames and just replaces the roof skin and rear window with a retractable fabric panel.

An advantage of the cabrio coach, particularly for unibody designs is that retaining more of the car's original structure means that structural rigidity is higher (or the vehicle weight is lower) than traditional cabriolets.

If a vehicle's roof includes metal panels as well as the soft-top, it may be considered to be a canvas top design or a fixed-roof vehicle with a sunroof, instead of being a cabrio-coach. These have the advantage that they may be more easily retrofitted to an existing car; it was a factory option (although listed as a separate model) for the Volkswagen Beetle up to 1963.

== History ==
This type of roof was popular in Germany in the 1930s, and was found on cars such as the Citroën 2CV, Fiat 500, and others. The cabrio coach version of the Nash Rambler was marketed as a "convertible landau".

Some more modern cars have also featured this roof style, for instance Nissan Figaro, Citroën Visa Décapotable, Fiat 500 (2007), and the Citroën C3 Pluriel.

== See also ==
- Studebaker Wagonaire: a station wagon with a retractable rear roof section for oversized loads, similar in concept to a cabrio coach
- GMC Envoy XUV: a SUV With a retractable rear roof section for the same purpose as the Wagonaire listed above.
- Numerous vehicles were made as a hybrid hard top with the rear half as a retractable soft top including: 1998–1999 Toyota RAV4 convertible, 1989-? Geo/Chevrolet Tracker (Suzuki Vitara) convertible, 2002–2005 Land Rover Freelander Convertible, 1998–2002 Kia Sportage Convertible, 1978–1981 Baur BMW 3-series, 1998-2005 Isuzu Amigo convertible, Porsche 911L "Soft Window" Targa, 1988 Jaguar XJ-SC cabriolet targa, 1975-82 Lancia Zagato targa with rear convertible. Examples shown in this Motortrend article
