= Lancia Delta =

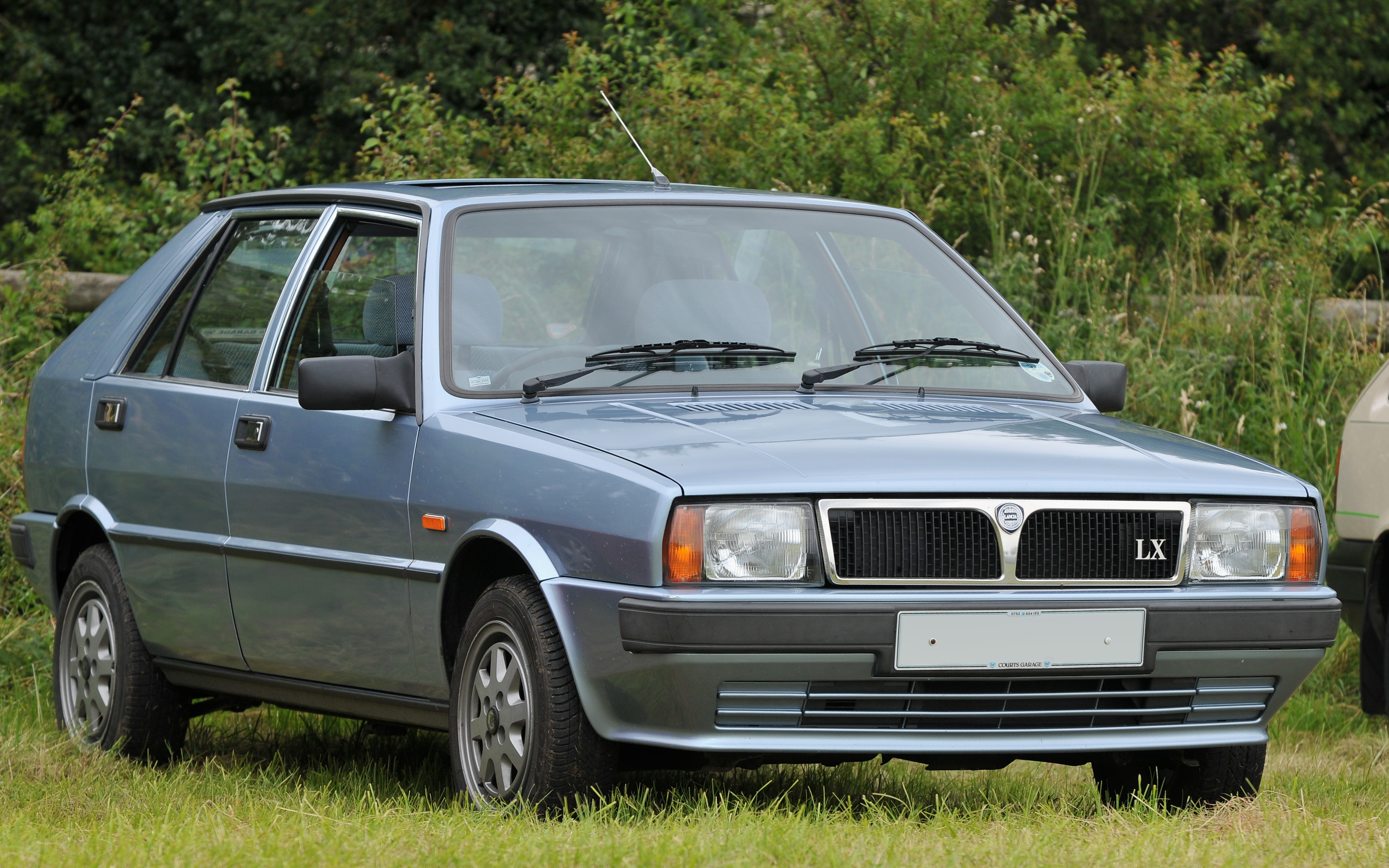
- Lancia Delta LX 1.3 (first generation, 1986–91 model)

Overview
- Manufacturer: Fiat Auto (1979–1986; 1991–1999); Alfa-Lancia Industriale (1987–1991); Fiat Group Automobiles (2008–2014)
- Production: 1979–1999; 2008–2014

Body and chassis
- Class: Small family car (C)
- Body style: Hatchback
- Layout: Transverse front-engine, front-wheel-drive Transverse four-wheel-drive

The Lancia Delta (stylized Lancia δ) is a small family car produced by Italian automobile manufacturer Lancia in three generations. The first generation (1979–1994) debuted at the 1979 Frankfurt Motor Show, the second generation (1993–1999) debuted at the 1993 Geneva Motor Show, and the third generation (2008–2014) debuted at 2008 Geneva Motor Show.

The first generation Delta dominated the World Rally Championship during the late 1980s and early 1990s. The homologation requirements of Group A regulations meant marketing road-going versions of these competition cars — the Lancia Delta HF 4WD and HF Integrale. A total of 44,296 Integrales were produced. Total production number of the Delta first generation was 478,645 cars.

== First generation ==
First generation
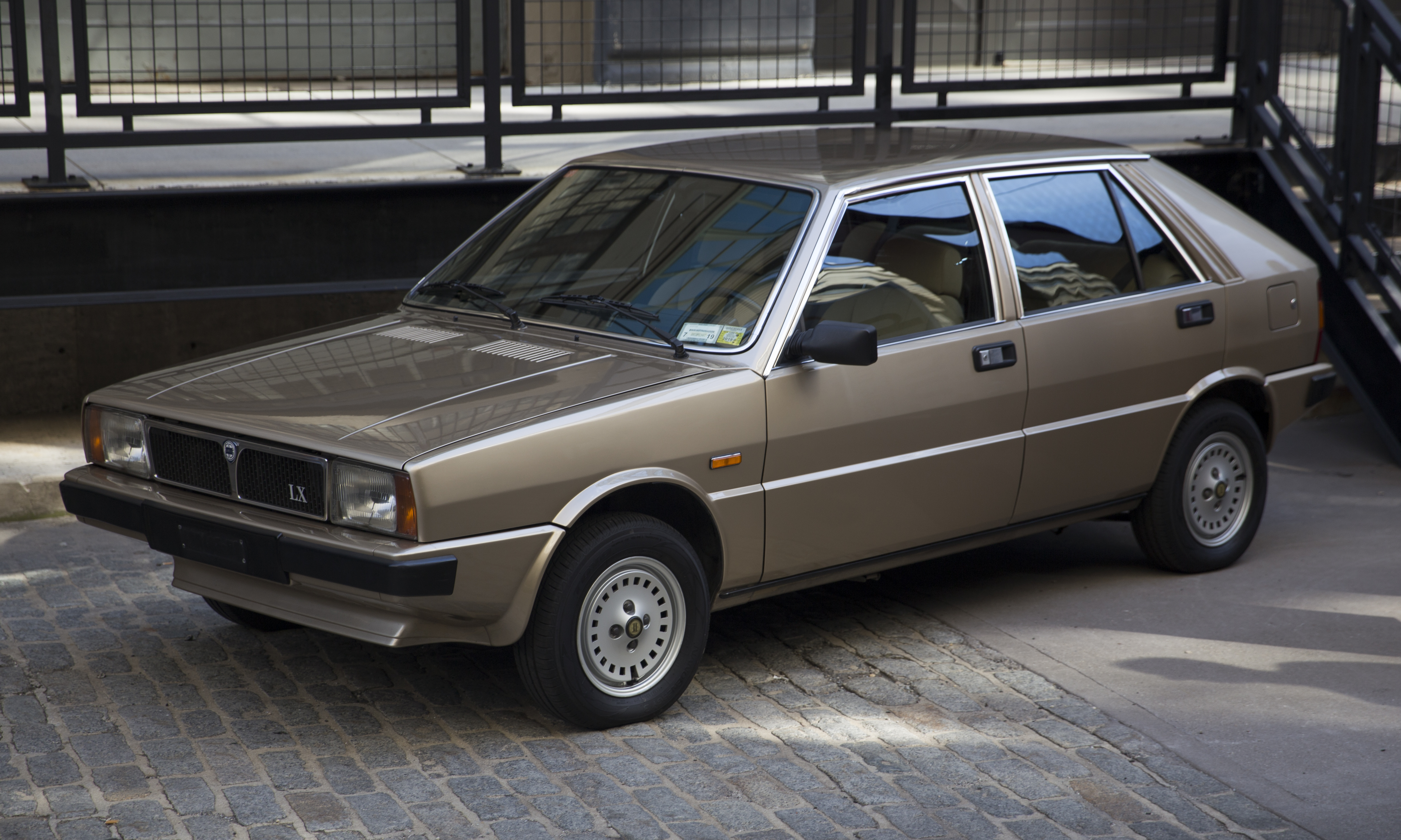
- 1982 Lancia Delta 1500 LX

Overview
- Also called: Saab-Lancia 600 (Sweden, Finland and Norway)
- Production: 1979–1994
- Assembly: Italy: Chivasso, Piedmont (Chivasso plant)
- Designer: Giorgetto Giugiaro at Italdesign

Body and chassis
- Body style: 5-door hatchback
- Layout: Transverse front-engine, front-wheel-drive or four-wheel-drive
- Related: Fiat Ritmo; Lancia Prisma

Powertrain
- Engine: Petrol: 1.1 L I4; 1.3 L I4; 1.5 L I4; 1.6 L I4; 1.6 L turbo I4; 2.0 L 831 D5/E5 DOHC turbo I4; Diesel: 1.9 L turbo I4
- Transmission: 4-speed manual; 5-speed manual; 3-speed automatic

Dimensions
- Wheelbase: 2,475 mm (97.4 in)
- Length: 3,885 mm (153.0 in) (1979–1982); 3,895 mm (153.3 in) (1982–1994)
- Width: 1,620 mm (63.8 in)
- Height: 1,380 mm (54.3 in); 1,355 mm (53.3 in)
- Kerb weight: 955–1,340 kg (2,105–2,954 lb)

The first Delta (Tipo 831) was a five-door hatchback, designed by Giorgetto Giugiaro and released in 1979. Between 1980 and 1982, it was also sold in Sweden, Denmark and Norway by Saab Automobile, badged as the "Saab-Lancia 600" to replace the retired 96 model. The Delta was voted the 1980 European Car of the Year.

A special Delta HF Integrale version was a four-wheel drive hot hatch with a turbocharged petrol engine. Modified versions of the HF dominated the World Rally Championship, scoring 46 victories overall and winning the Constructors' Championship a record six times in a row from 1987 to 1992, in addition to Drivers' Championship titles for Juha Kankkunen (1987 and 1991) and Miki Biasion (1988 and 1989).

The Lancia Delta S4, while sharing the same name and appearance, was a purpose-built racecar under Group B regulations, and was entirely different from the mass-produced consumer versions. The works team ran the Delta S4 immediately prior to the HF 4WD and Integrale models' world championship careers from the season-ending 1985 RAC Rally until the end of the 1986 season.

=== History ===
==== Development ====
The car that would become the Delta during its development went by the project codename "Y 5", was conceived as an upmarket front-wheel drive small family car positioned below the larger Beta; an offering around four metres in length had been absent from Lancia's lineup since the demise of the Fulvia Berlina in 1973. This platform, derived from the platform of the Fiat Ritmo, with different suspension and more welding points, for a stiffer chassis.

Design was by Giorgetto Giugiaro's Italdesign. Its platform put together MacPherson suspension developed for the Beta with four-cylinder, SOHC engines derived from the Fiat Ritmo. The Fiat engines were revised by Lancia engineers with Weber twin-choke carburettors, new inlet manifolds, exhaust systems and electronic ignitions, changes that combined to produce 85 PS (63 kW; 84 hp), ten more horsepower than the same engines did in the Ritmos. To achieve its market positioning the Delta offered features uncommon in the segment, as fully independent suspension, rack and pinion steering, available air conditioning, an optional split-folding rear seat, a height-adjustable steering wheel, and a defogger. Its three-piece body-coloured bumpers made from polyester resin sheet moulding compound were claimed by Lancia to be a first in the industry. The heating and ventilation were developed with help from Saab, experts in the field, who also claimed to have had a hand in the rust proofing of the Delta. It was also thanks to Saab that the split-folding rear seats were developed and the bootlid was extended all the way down to the bumper, simplifying loading and unloading.

==== Debut ====
While details about the car were known since the spring, the Lancia Delta was unveiled to the public at the September 1979 Frankfurt Motor Show, At launch three models were offered: the base Delta 1300 four-speed, with a 1,301 cc 75 PS (55 kW) engine and simplified equipment, Delta 1300 five-speed, which added more features and an overdrive fifth gear for cruising, and Delta 1500, with a 1,498 cc 85 PS (62.6 kW) engine and a five-speed gearbox. The Delta was met with a warm reception at the Frankfurt unveiling by the Italian and German press; in December it was awarded the European Car of the Year for 1980 recognition by a jury of 53 automotive journalists from 16 European countries.

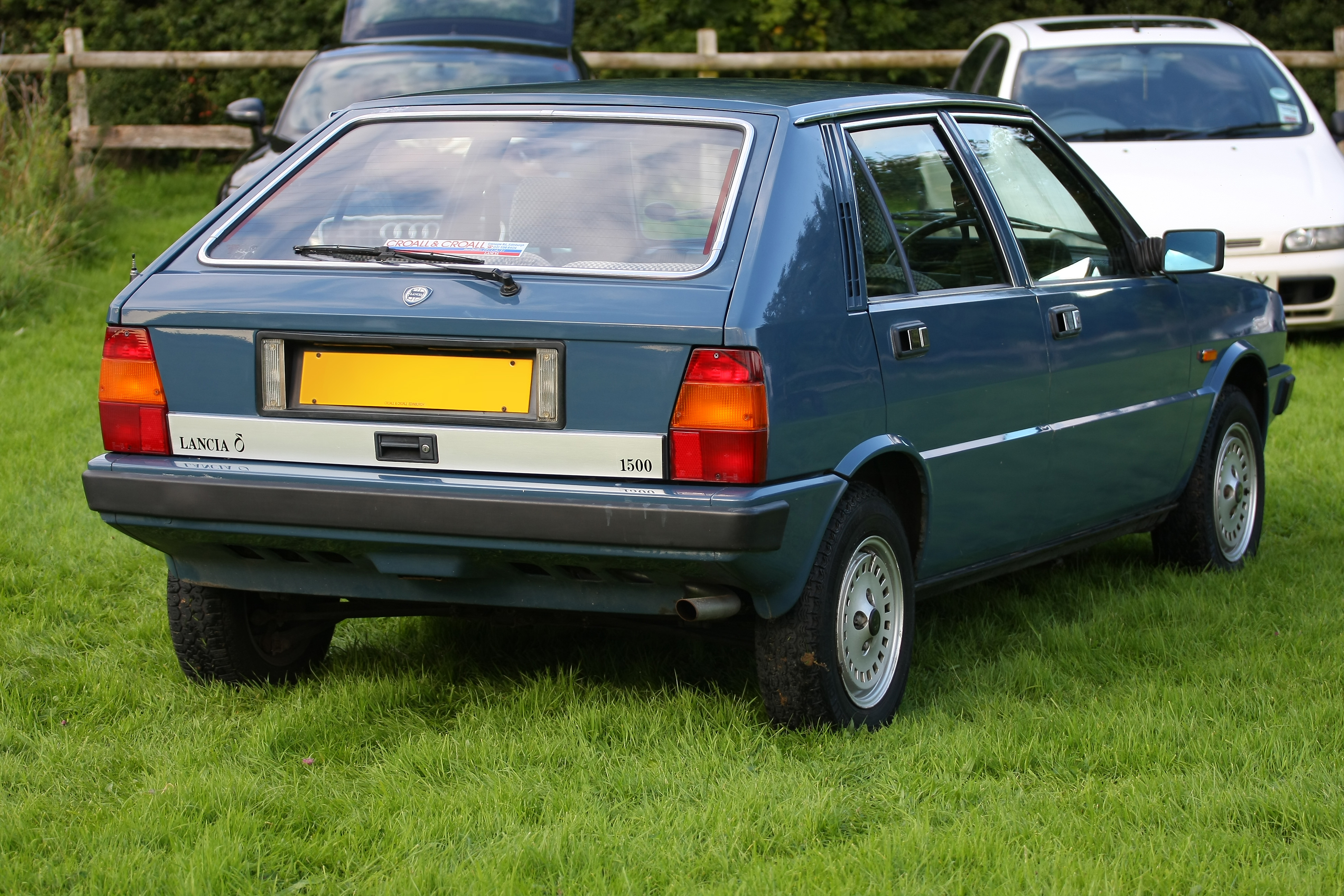
1982 Lancia Delta 1500

Sales started in October 1979; 43,000 were sold in 1980, and by the end of 1981 production had exceeded 100,000. At the beginning of 1982 as an automatic transmission option was added, the 1500 Automatica; its three-speed was built by Lancia in the Verrone plant and was already being installed on Betas. In March the top-of-the-line 1500 LX trim level joined the lineup; it featured extended convenience equipment, metallic paint, 14-inch alloy wheels designed by Giugiaro and wool cloth upholstery in a chequered fabric specially designed by Italian fashion house Zegna. Two months after, the trim level was extended to the 1.3-litre engine, which simultaneously increased its output to 78 PS thanks to a raised compression ratio and electronic ignition.

==== 1982 facelift ====
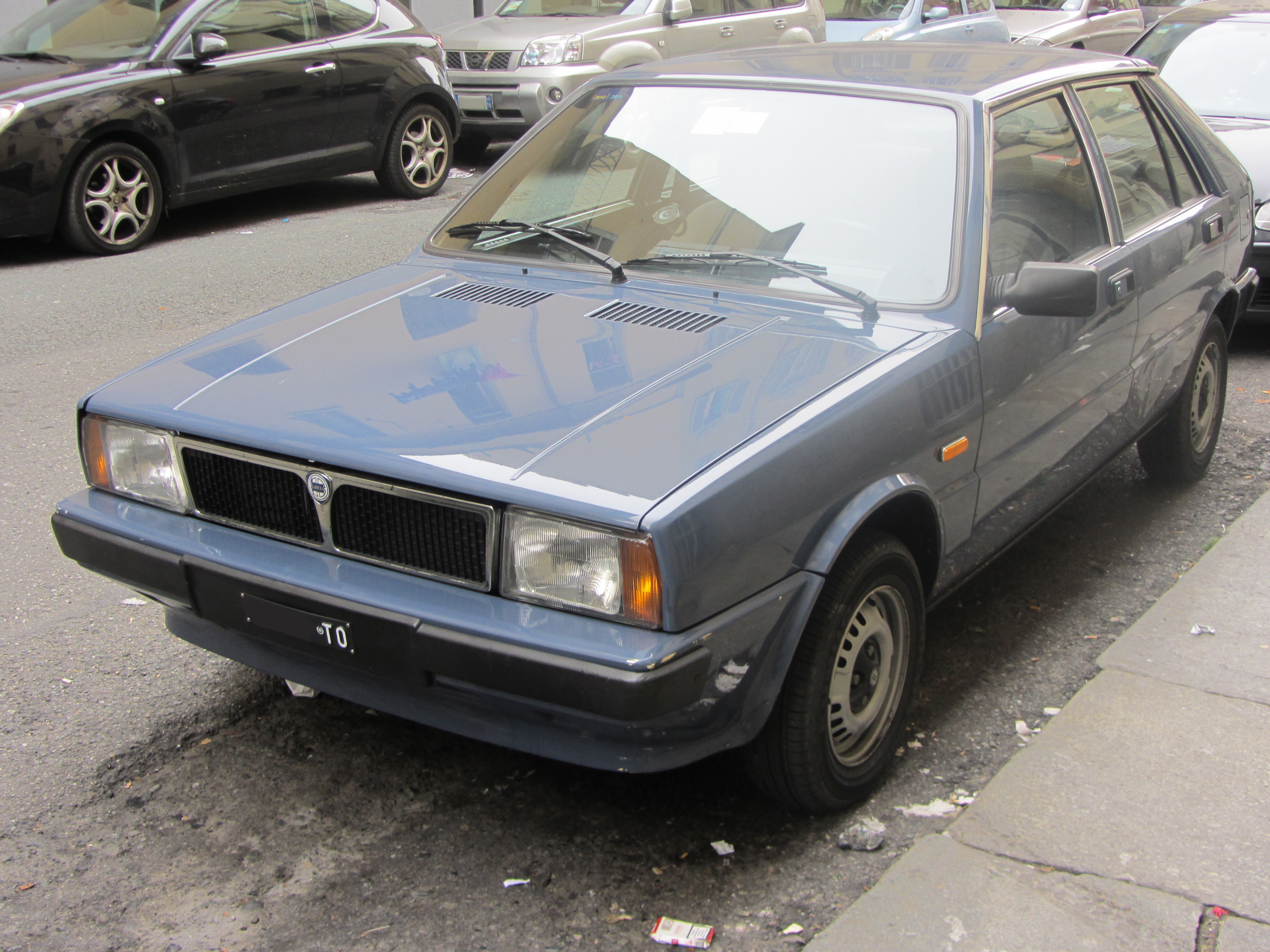
1982–1986 Lancia Delta

November 1982 brought the first facelift for the Delta. The bumpers were changed from three-piece sheet moulded compound to one-piece thermoplastic polymer, the front one was redesigned with a more prominent lower spoiler; another aerodynamic addition was a flat body-colour spoiler applied to the rear part of the roof. Other changes included the deletion of the anodised fascia between the rear tail lights and a 40 kg weight reduction on all models. Inside there were new seats and, on the range-topping model, an optional digital trip computer. Concurrently the Delta GT 1600 was launched, the car's first sporting variant. It was powered by a 1,585 cc, 105 PS DOHC engine with Marelli Digiplex ignition; lower profile tyres, retuned suspension and disk brakes on all four wheels completed the package. Standard equipment was the richest available and some optionals like air conditioning were exclusive to the GT; the cabin was upholstered in Zegna cloth. Outside details like a "GT" badge on the right side of the grille, matte black door handles and window trim distinguished it from other Deltas. As the five-speed 1500, four-speed 1300 and LX versions were dropped, the latter only to be reintroduced in April 1984 on the 1300 LX, with revised equipment, the range was now composed of three models. On 9 March 1984 the 200,000th Delta left the Chivasso factory.

==== Delta HF ====
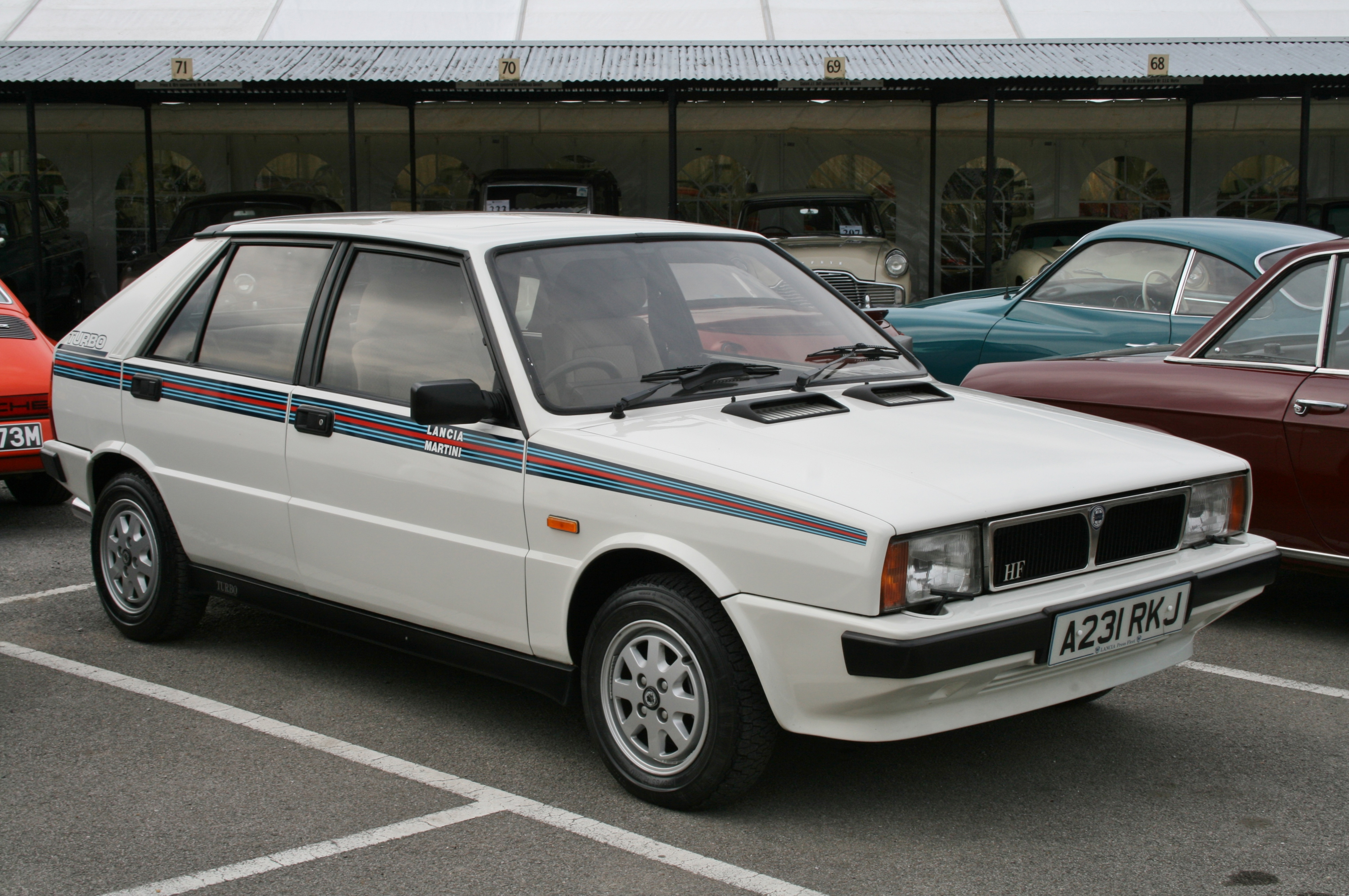
A 1984 Lancia Delta HF, originally a Lancia UK press car. Despite sporting Martini stripes, this is not one of the 1984 HF Martini limited editions, which had different graphics and badging.

The first true performance-oriented Delta was the Delta HF, which was introduced in July 1983 and went on sale in September after a first appearance at the Frankfurt Motor Show. The HF acronym—last used on the Stratos—stands for "high fidelity", and had been applied to sports and racing variants of Lancia cars since 1966. It is front-wheel drive and powered by a turbocharged version of the 1.6-litre engine from the Delta GT; the system consists of a Garrett TBO-225 turbocharger with wastegate valve, an air-to-air heat exchanger, a blow-through twin-choke Weber carburetor and Marelli Microplex ignition with pre-ignition control. To withstand the additional stress deriving from turbocharging, upgrades were made to the oil system, with increased capacity and an oil cooler, and to the cylinder heads with sodium-filled valves. The gearbox is a ZF five-speed unit. Dampers, springs and steering were retuned, and the tyres are wide 175/65 Michelin TRX on R 340 alloy wheels.

The exterior of the HF is relatively understated: changes were limited to silver "HF" badging on the grille, a deeper chin spoiler, black trim as on the GT, black roof drip rail mouldings, black side skirts with small silver "turbo" badges in front of the rear wheels, the 1982 roof spoiler painted in black, air intake cowls on the bonnet grilles, bronze-tinted glass and eight-spoke alloy wheels. The cabin features a leather-covered steering wheel and supplementary digital instrumentation with bar indicators; the upholstery material is the usual beige Zegna fabric, and Recaro sport seats covered in the same cloth were optional. About ten-thousand Delta HFs were made, in a two-year production period.

A special limited edition of the HF, named "HF Martini", was launched at the March 1984 Geneva Motor Show. To celebrate the rally victories of the Lancia-Martini Rally 037 it was painted white with a Martini stripe on the sides below the door handles, and carried Martini-coloured badging; Recaro sport seats were standard. Only 150 were produced between 1984 and 1985.

==== Delta HF turbo ====
In October 1985 Lancia unveiled, alongside the road-going Delta S4, a new version of the HF, renamed Delta HF turbo in advance of the four-wheel-drive awaited coming in summer 1986. To address some criticisms the car was given less subdued styling features and more generous equipment to differentiate: red "HF turbo" scripts on the grille, the side skirts and the rear hatch, a three-spoke sport steering wheel, dual wing mirrors, a two-colour pinstripe along the mid-bodyside character line and Pirelli P6 tyres on 14-inch Cromodora alloy wheels with a new eight-hole design. Price, technical specifications, and performance remained mostly unchanged. The HF Turbo remained on sale alongside the more powerful four-wheel-drive HF models when they were introduced.

==== 1986 facelift ====
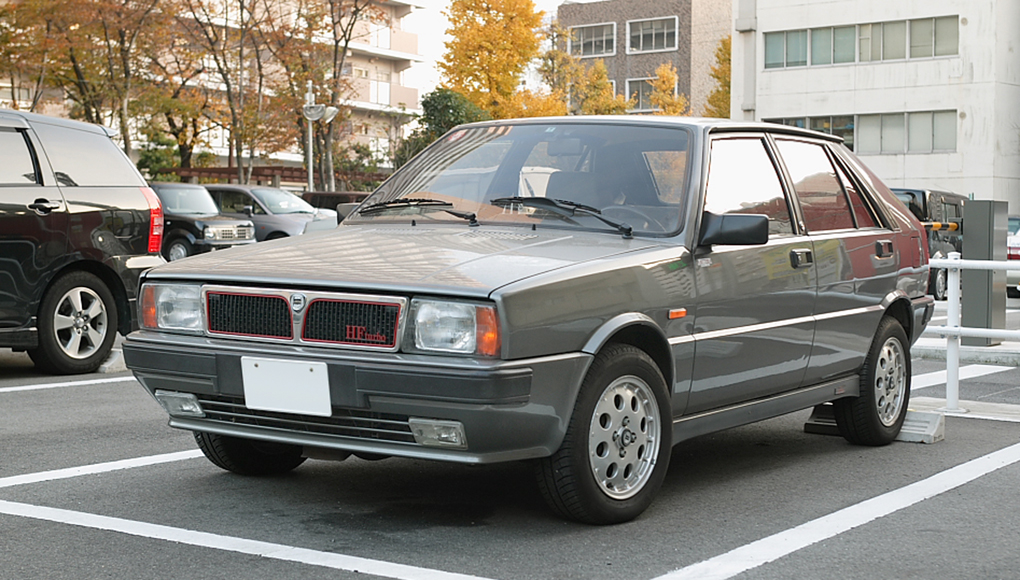
1986–1991 Lancia Delta HF turbo

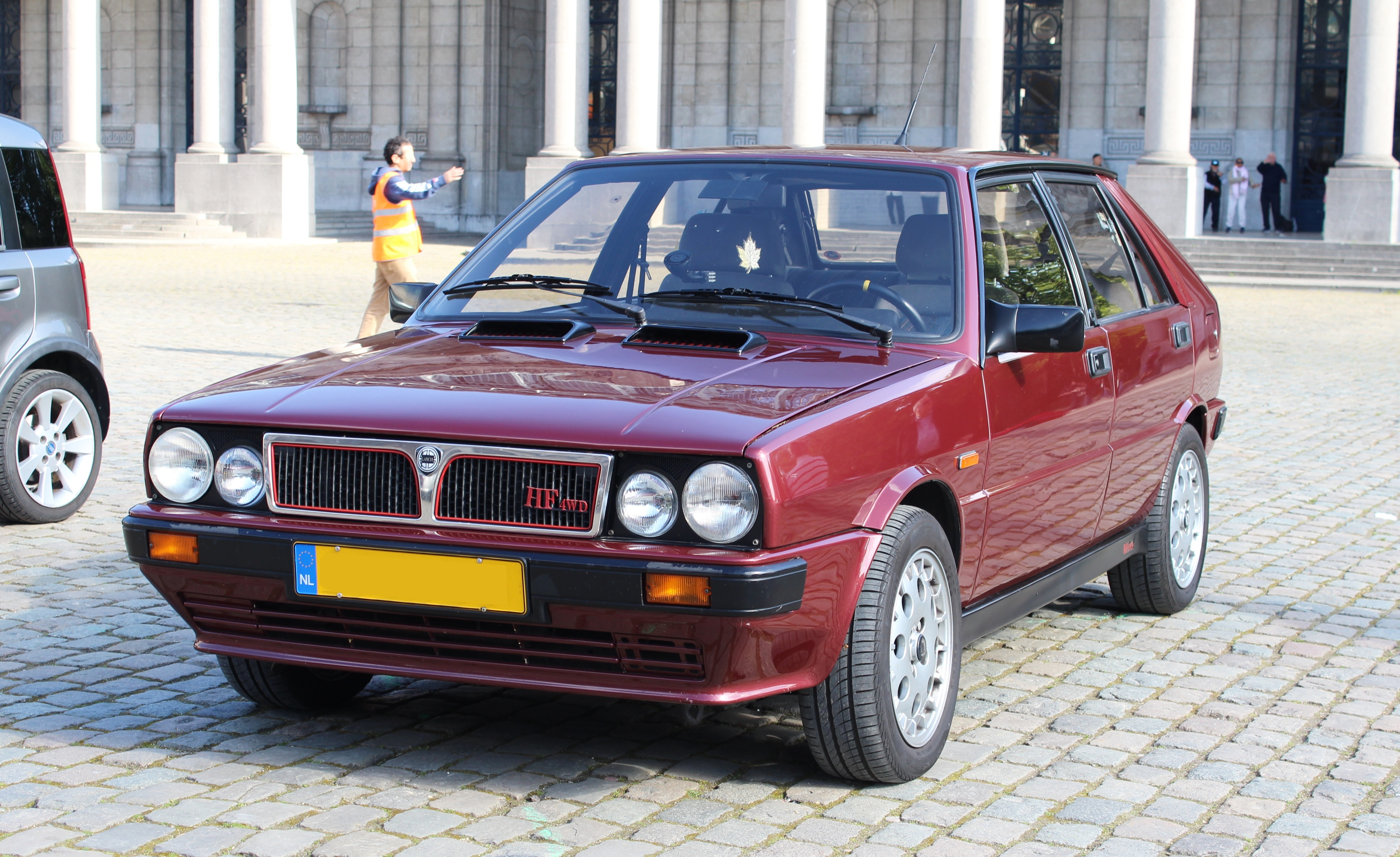
Lancia Delta HF 4WD, predecessor of Delta Integrale

The HF turbo soon lost its crown as top-of-the-range Delta, as the turbocharged 2.0-litre and four-wheel drive Delta HF 4WD was unveiled at the April 1986 Turin Motor Show. Some of the features of the HF 4WD previewed a major mid-cycle refresh for the entire Delta range, announced in May 1986 and put on sale in June. New enveloping bumpers—the front one with provisions for integrated fog lights—gave the car a more modern look; the entire front end was changed with a new grille and new headlight covers, which were slanted forward and protruded from the bodywork in an effort to make the car more aerodynamic. The roof spoiler introduced in 1982 was removed.

Seven models composed the 1986 range: 1.3, LX 1.3, 1.5 Automatica, GT i.e., HF turbo, HF 4WD and turbo ds. The entry-level model was the 1.3; the 1,301 cc engine had revised intake and exhaust system, fuel cut-off, a new carburettor and breakerless ignition. It was also available on the more upscale Delta LX 1.3. Similar changes were made to the powertrain of the Delta 1.5 Automatica.

The Delta GT and HF turbo were each given Weber IAW integrated electronic ignition and fuel injection system to become the Delta GT i.e. and the Delta HF turbo i.e., with 108 PS and 140 PS respectively. Deeper changes had been made to the GT i.e. engine: the cylinder head had been rotated 180°, bringing the exhaust side to the front for better cooling, and the whole engine was canted forward 18° to lower its centre of mass height.

The Delta HF turbo was updated to HF 4WD looks and interior, from which it differed mainly for the square headlights and single exhaust.

The Delta turbo ds marked the introduction of the first diesel engine on the Delta. This was a 1,929 cc eight-valve four-cylinder from the Prisma, with an output of 80 PS; it used a KKK turbocharger with wastegate valve, an intercooler and an oil cooler. Lancia positioned the turbo ds as an elegant-sporting model like the GT i.e., giving it similar option availability, the same grey-beige chequered Zegna cloth upholstery and complete instrumentation—which included oil pressure and boost pressure gauges. If not in performance, the turbo ds surpassed its petrol sibling in equipment, with side skirts from the HF turbo and standard power steering.

In September 1987 the HF 4WD was replaced by the more capable Delta HF integrale, which in turn evolved into the 16-valve Delta HF integrale 16v in March 1989.

A new sporty trim level for the 1.3 was added in May 1990, the Delta Personalizzata, available in red or white with contrasting twin pinstripe and electric blue cloth upholstery; standard equipment comprised body-colour wing mirrors, tachometer, clock and sport steering wheel.

Later that year the sport models (turbo ds, GT i.e., HF turbo and HF integrale 16v) received richer equipment and interiors in new combinations of colourful striped velour and Alcantara. The optional Recaro seats of the two HF models were now fully upholstered in perforated Alcantara, green or grey depending on the exterior colour. On the integrale only, they could be had in perforated black leather for an additional fee.

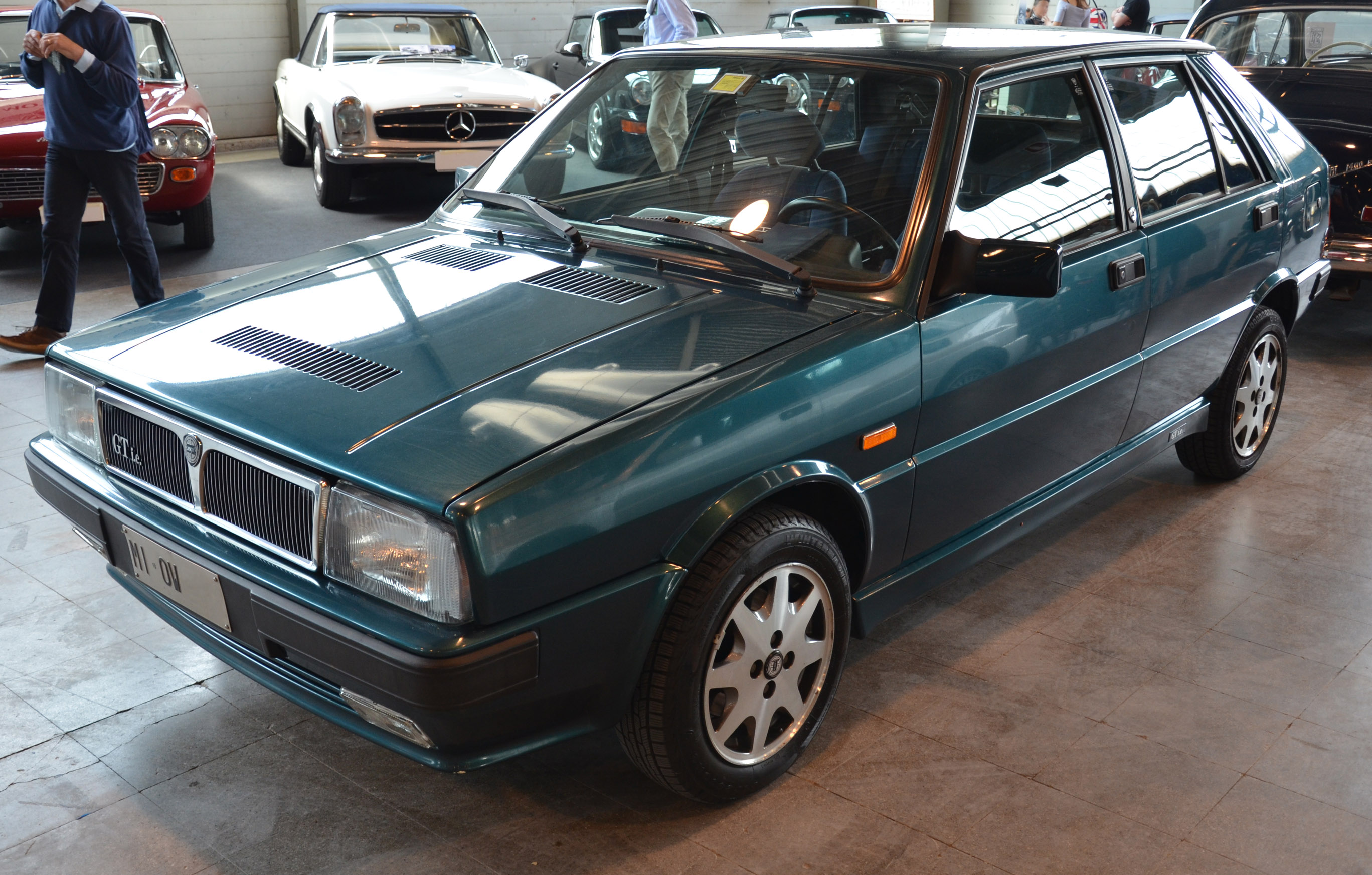
1991 model Lancia Delta GT i.e.

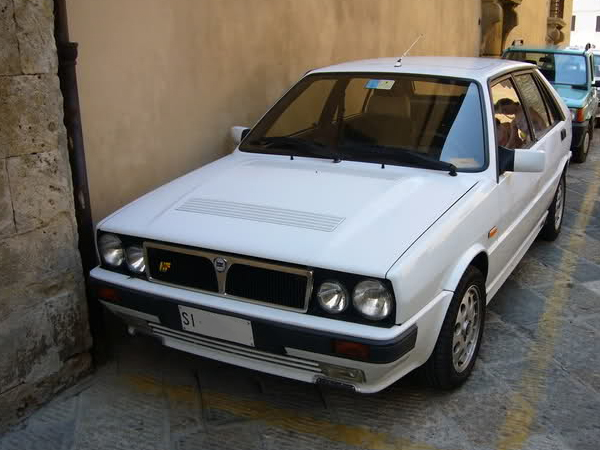
1992 model Lancia Delta HF turbo

==== 1991 revisions ====
In June 1991 the last update of the first generation Lancia Delta went on sale, almost twelve years after its 1979 début. The front-wheel drive range was reduced to three models, namely LX, GT i.e. and HF turbo. On all three of them, small touches like body-colour side skirts and dual body-colour wing mirrors created a more up to date look. The LX and GT i.e. wore white front turn indicators, a grille with chrome vertical bars, the louvered bonnet from the original HF integrale, and optional 8-spoke diamond-cut alloy wheels from the Dedra. The Delta LX had abandoned the 1.3 in favour of a revised version of the 1.5-litre engine. Updated colour and trim included green and blue "Metallescente" mica paint and Glen plaid cloth upholstery on lower models, while sports models continued with the interiors introduced in 1990. The HF integrale 16v—due to be replaced at the end of 1991 by the much improved HF integrale "Evoluzione"—handed down its dual round headlights and domed, vented bonnet to the HF turbo, which now looked almost like an integrale. A few months later the HF turbo even replaced its traditional red model identification script on the radiator grille with a yellow HF badge, like the one found on the newly introduced Evoluzione. Concurrently the GT i.e. received new "1600 i.e." badging.

A very final, minor round of updates was made when the 1992 models switched to a catalytic converter-only engine offering, in compliance with Euro 1 emission standards. The Delta GT i.e. morphed into the 1600 i.e., and together with the HF turbo was the sole front-wheel drive Delta offered. All variants acquired new, more understated upholstery: the HF turbo switched from velour to herringbone inserts on the Alcantara seats and door panels, while the 1600 abandoned Alcantara altogether for full Glen plaid cloth. As the second generation was ready to be launched in 1993, after a career of 13 years the front-wheel drive Delta was phased out at the end of 1992, after over 478,000 had been produced. Production of the HF integrale would continue for two years more.

=== Four-wheel-drive HF variants ===
==== Four-wheel-drive system ====
Lancia's first four-wheel-drive car was a Delta. As early as April 1982, a turbocharged four-wheel-drive Delta Turbo 4x4 prototype was shown at the Turin Motor Show to gauge public reaction, and tested by journalist at the La Mandria test track. It was based on the regular production model, but had a 128 bhp 1.6-litre turbocharged engine, four disk brakes, and a top speed of over 190 km/h (118 mph). Its drivetrain was however not related to the more sophisticated one found on the first mass produced four-wheel-drive Lancias, which were shown at the 1986 Turin Motor Show: the Delta HF 4WD and its tamer saloon sibling, the Prisma 4WD.

The four-wheel-drive system used on the Delta HF 4WD and all HF integrales was instead based on the one developed for the 1985 Lancia Delta S4 Group B rally car, albeit in a transverse front-engine instead of a longitudinal mid-engine layout. Both systems used three differentials, the central one being an epicyclic gearing controlled by a Ferguson viscous coupling. The epicyclic gearing split torque on the two axles according to a fixed ratio, determined by the number of teeth on its gears. Initially front biased to maximize traction according to static load distribution, the torque split became increasingly rear-biased with every successive iteration of the Delta HF. The epicyclic gearing received motion via its externally teethed ring gear, which meshed with a pinion on the five-speed gearbox lay shaft. From there it was transferred to the front differential via the sun gear, and to the rear differential via the planet carrier, a couple of 90° bevel gears and a three-piece drive shaft.

The Ferguson coupling's purpose was to transfer torque between the axles. During normal operation, i.e. when the two axles rotated at the same velocity, it did nothing, simply rotating as a unit. As soon as there was a difference in velocity between the two axles, it began transferring torque from the faster to the slower rotating axle—which is usually the one with better grip. When difference in velocity became extreme, it locked up completely, nullifying the slip between the axles and transferring the maximum amount of torque. Finally there were the other two differentials: a conventional open one at the front and a Torsen (torque sensing) type one at the rear. Supplied by the American Gleason Corporation, the Torsen differential automatically divided the torque between the rear wheels according to the available grip, with a maximum lock-up of 70%.

==== Delta HF 4WD ====
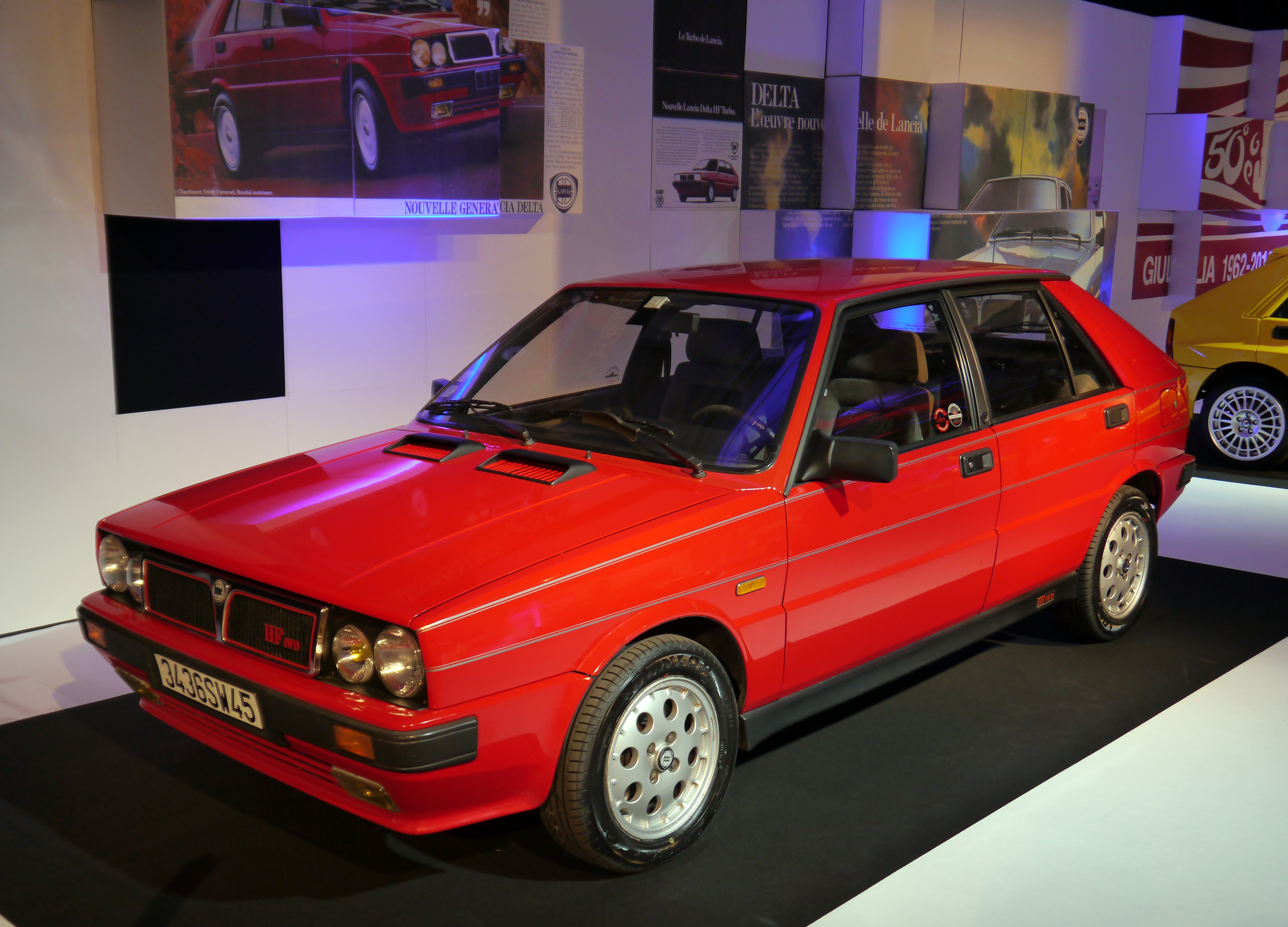

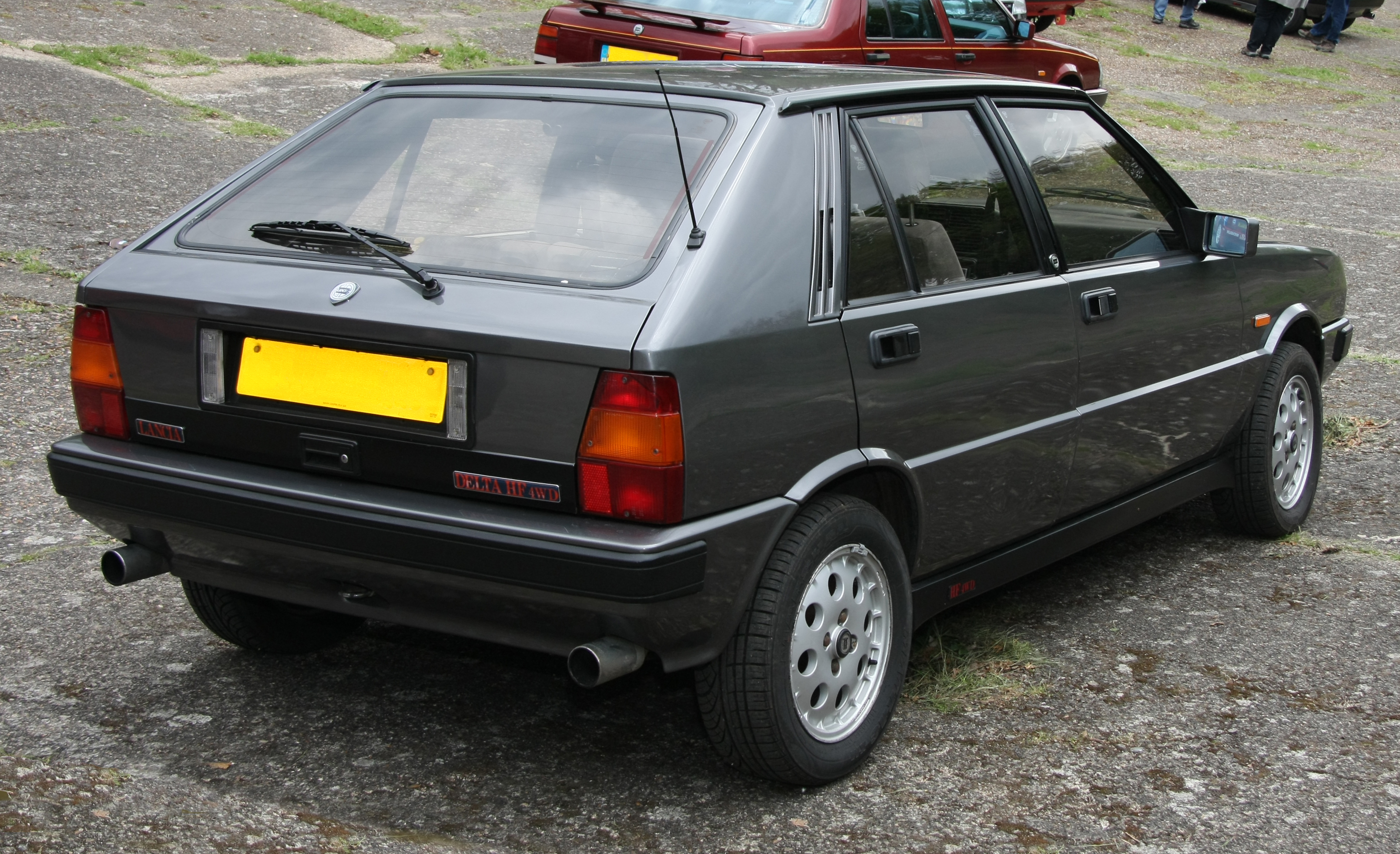
Lancia Delta HF 4WD

The Delta HF 4WD was unveiled at the April 1986 Turin Motor Show, becoming the top of the Delta range.

The HF 4WD's 1,995 cc, twin-cam, eight-valve engine with two counter-rotating balancing shafts was derived from the Lancia Thema i.e. turbo saloon. It was equipped with a Garrett turbocharger, a wastegate valve, an air-to-air intercooler and Weber IAW integrated electronic ignition and fuel injection; to support turbocharging it also adopted tri-metallic crankpin and main bearings, sodium-filled valves, bronze valve guides and an oil cooler. Engine output was 165 PS (121 kW; 163 hp) at 5,250 rpm, and 26.5 kg⋅m (260 N⋅m; 192 lb⋅ft) of torque at 2,750 rpm, that could rise to 29 kg⋅m (284 N⋅m; 210 lb⋅ft) for short periods of time thanks to an overboost function. On the Delta HF 4WD the torque split ratio of the central epicyclic differential stood at 56/44 front to rear.

The basic suspension layout of the Delta 4WD remained the same as in the rest of the two-wheel drive Delta range: MacPherson strut–type independent suspension on all four corners, dual-rate dampers and helicoidal springs, with the struts and springs set slightly off-centre. The suspension mounting provided more isolation by incorporating flexible rubber links. Progressive rebound bumpers were adopted, while the damper rates, front and rear toe-in and the relative angle between springs and dampers have all been altered. The steering was power assisted rack and pinion. The alloy wheels were the 5½J×14-inch Cromodora eight-hole ones found on the HF turbo, but wore wider, lower profile 185/60 SR14 tyres. Brakes were the same all-around disks (vented fronts) used on the GT i.e. and HF turbo.

Visually the HF 4WD carried over most accoutrements of the HF turbo—such as the bonnet cowls, side skirts, and blacked-out trim—and then added more. Besides the new bumpers (the front one with integrated fog lights) that would soon be adopted by all Deltas with the 1986 facelift, there were quadruple round headlights—the inner pair smaller in diameter than the outer, red piping around the grille openings, two double pinstripes highlighting the waistline and side crease, and dual exit exhausts. Red "HF 4WD" scripts and badges were carried on the radiator grille, side skirts and on the matte black insert between the tail lights. Inside seats and door panels were upholstered in a combination of grey Alcantara and multicolour "Harlem" wool cloth, supplied by Italian fashion house Missoni. Optional Recaro anatomic sport seats were covered in the same materials. The instrumentation had yellow scales and hands, a prerogative of all HF models to come; it added two auxiliary gauges to the six already present in the Delta's instrument binnacle, and included a boost pressure gauge, a voltmeter, oil and water thermometers, as well as an oil manometer

Some months after the HF 4WD's introduction, at the end of the 1986 season, Group B rallying was terminated after a string of fatal accidents, and Group A took over as the World Rally Championship class. A production of at least 5,000 examples in 12 months was required by the new homologation rules. Although not originally developed with rallying in mind, the Delta HF 4WD provided a suitable basis to build a Group A rally car. The Group A Delta HF 4WD scored the first two places in its first outing and 1987 season starter, the Monte Carlo Rally. From there it went on to win 9 out of 13 championship races, and ultimately the 1987 World Rally Championship for Manufacturers. Juha Kankkunen also won the 1987 World Rally Championship for Drivers at the wheel of a Delta HF 4WD. Delta HF 4WDs also placed first in the two races of the 1988 season, before being replaced by the much-improved Delta HF integrale. The match of Lancia's three differential four-wheel-drive system and turbocharged 2.0-litre engine had proven competitive, and through continuous improvements would go on to win six consecutive World Rally Championship titles.

==== Delta HF integrale "8V" ====
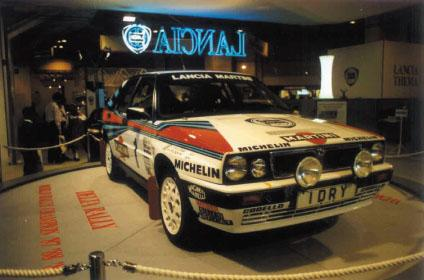
A Lancia Delta HF integrale 8V at the 1990 Birmingham Motor Show

The Lancia Delta HF integrale incorporated some of the features of the Delta HF 4WD into a road car. The engine was an eight-valve 2.0 L fuel injected four-cylinder, with balancing shafts. The HF version featured new valves, valve seats and water pump, larger water and oil radiators, more powerful cooling fan and bigger air cleaner. A larger capacity Garrett T3 turbocharger with improved airflow and bigger intercooler, revised settings for the electronic injection-ignition control unit and a knock sensor, boost power output to 185 PS (136 kW; 182 hp) at 5,300 rpm and maximum torque of 31 kg⋅m (304 N⋅m; 224 lb⋅ft) at 3,500 rpm.

The HF integrale had permanent four-wheel drive, a front transversely mounted engine and five-speed gearbox. An epicyclic centre differential normally splits the torque 56 per cent to the front axle, 44 per cent to the rear. A Ferguson viscous coupling balanced the torque split between front and rear axles depending on road conditions and tyre grip. The Torsen rear differential further divides the torque delivered to each rear wheel according to grip available. A shorter final drive ratio (3.111 instead of 2.944 on the HF 4WD) matched the larger 6.5x15 wheels to give 24 mph/1,000 rpm (39 km/h per 1,000 rpm) in fifth gear.

Braking and suspension were uprated to 284 mm (11.2 in) ventilated front discs, a larger brake master cylinder and servo, as well as revised front springs, dampers, and front struts.

The HF integrale was facelifted with bulged wheel arches for the wider section 195/55 VR tyres on 15-inch 6J alloy wheels. A new bonnet incorporated air louvres while the restyled bumpers wrapped around to meet the wheel arches at front and rear. The front bumper, now wider, incorporates air intakes and for the rectangular auxiliary driving lights. The side skirts are faired into the wheel arches at front and rear and the twin rear view mirrors are finished in body colour. There were only 50 RHD factory built cars, none of which were officially imported to the UK.

==== Delta HF integrale 16v ====
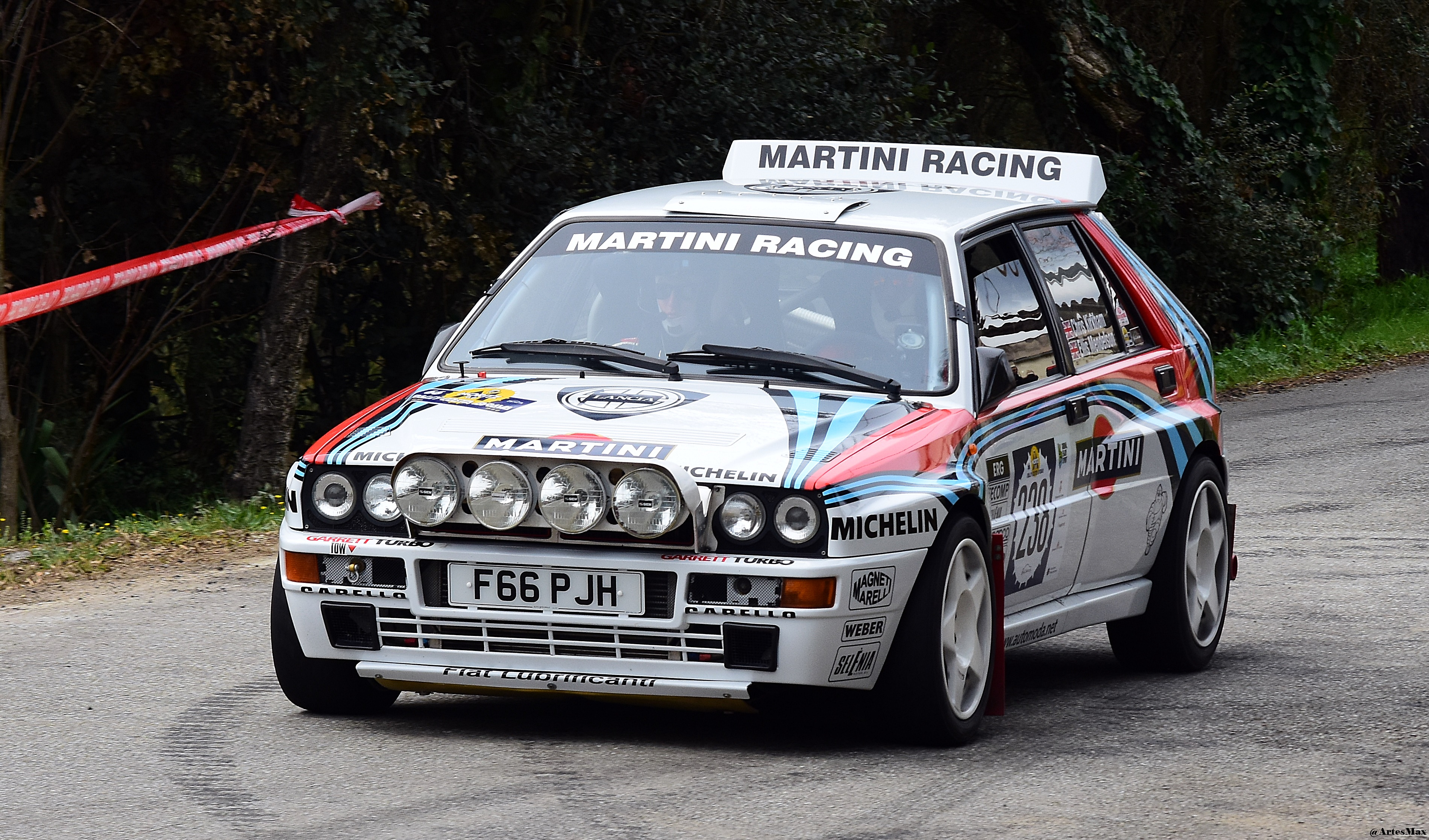
A Lancia Delta integrale HF 16V driven at the 2018 Rally Moritz Costa Brava

The 16v integrale was developed for rallying, introduced at the 1989 Geneva Motor Show, and made a winning debut on the 1989 San Remo Rally.

It featured a raised centre of the bonnet to accommodate the new 16-valve engine, as well as wider wheels and tyres and new identity badges front and rear. The torque split was changed to 47% front and 53% rear.

The turbocharged two-litre Lancia 16v engine produced 200 PS (147 kW; 197 hp) at 5,500 rpm, for a maximum speed of 220 km/h (137 mph) and 0–100 km/h (0–62 mph) in 5.7 seconds. Changes included larger injectors, a more responsive Garrett T3 turbocharger, a more efficient intercooler, and the ability to run on unleaded fuel without modification.

Alongside the 16v Lancia introduced an eight-valve variant equipped with a three-way catalytic converter—which reduced output to 177 PS (130 kW; 175 hp) — intended for those European markets where such emission control equipment was mandatory.

In the summer of 1990 some small updates were made to all Delta sports models, with the integrale receiving new upholstery materials. Like on the HF turbo, the combination of light grey Alcantara and multicolour stripe cloth used since 1986 was replaced by dark grey Alcantara with diagonal stripe velour. If the Recaro optional seats were ordered, the buyer could choose either full dark grey or green embossed Alcantara upholstery, or extra-cost perforated black leather.

==== Delta HF integrale "Evoluzione" ====
Lancia Delta HF integrale "Evoluzione"
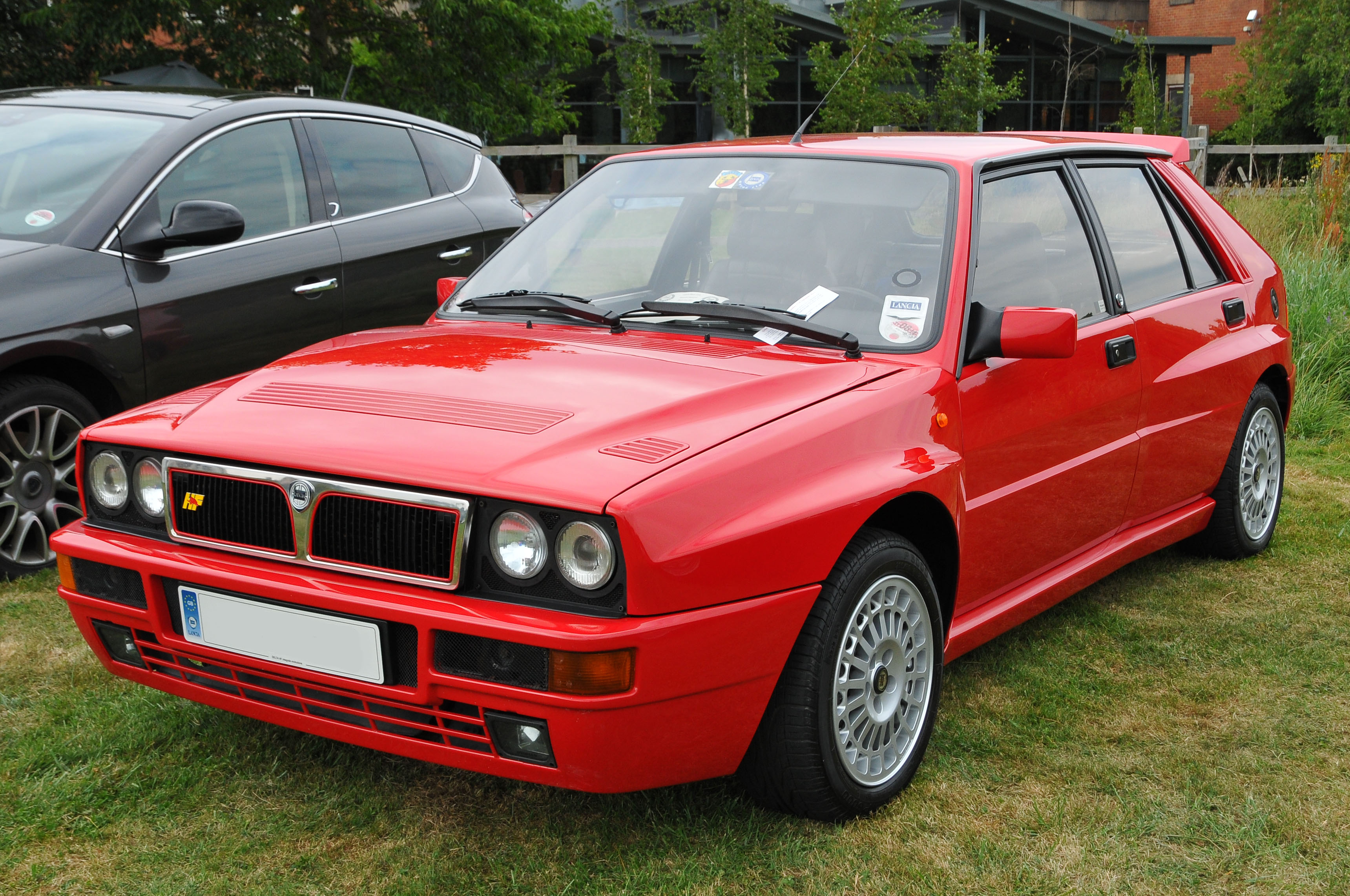

Body and chassis
- Body style: 5-door hatchback
- Layout: Transverse front-engine, four-wheel-drive

Powertrain
- Engine: 2.0 L 831E5.000 turbo I4
- Transmission: 5-speed manual

Dimensions
- Wheelbase: 2,479 mm (97.6 in)
- Length: 3,898 mm (153.5 in)
- Width: 1,767 mm (69.6 in)
- Height: 1,365 mm (53.7 in)

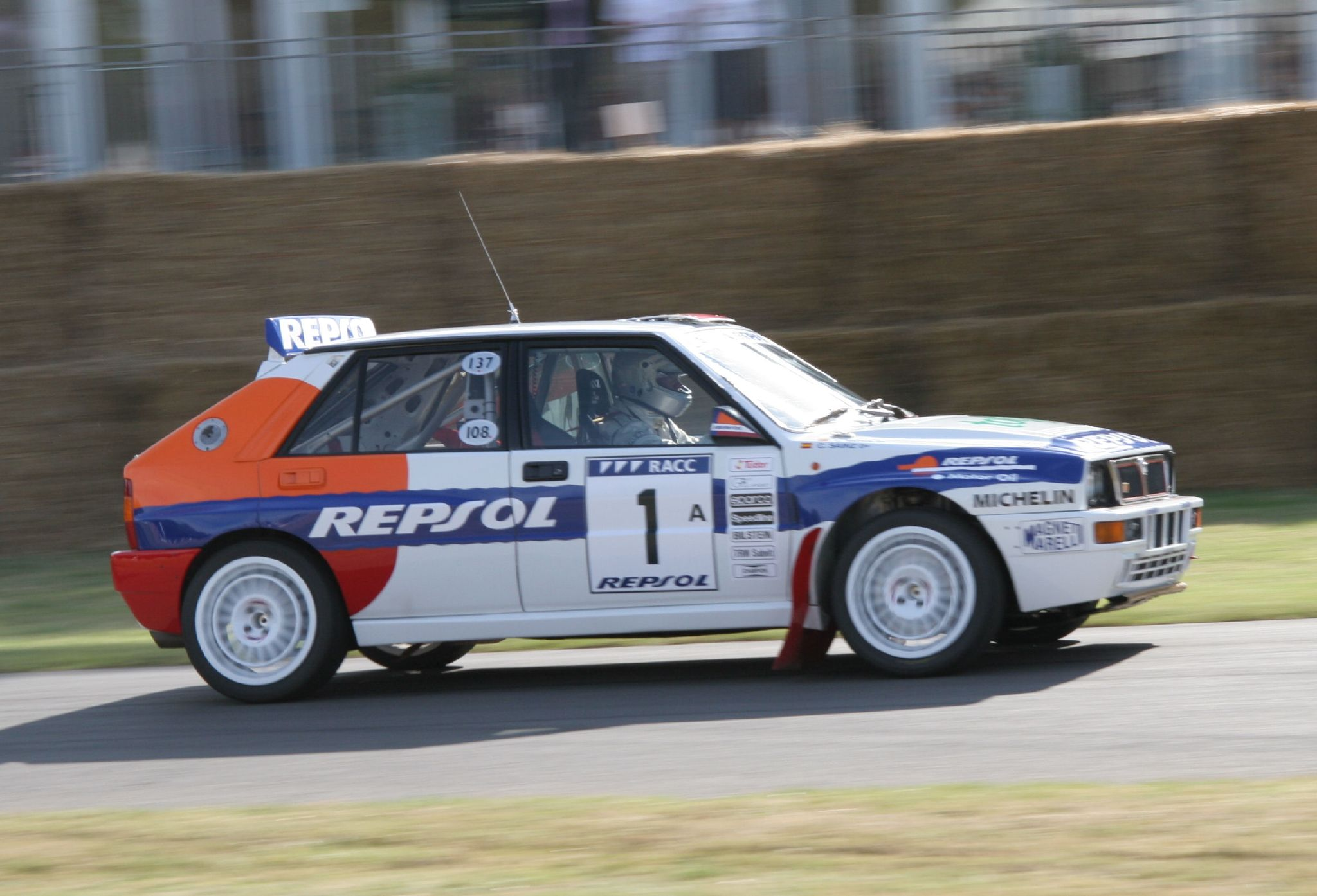
1993 Lancia Delta HF integrale at the 2006 Goodwood Festival of Speed

At the September 1991 Frankfurt Motor Show Lancia introduced an heavily revised Delta HF, once again named "Delta HF integrale"—but which became better known as the "HF integrale Evoluzione" or simply "HF integrale Evo". Evoluzione cars were built from October 1991 through 1992. At the end of the victorious 1991 World Rally Championship season, where the HF integrale 16v had won both the drivers' and manufacturers' championships, Lancia officially retired from rallying. Despite this, racing development of the HF integrale continued, and factory-developed HF integrale Evos were fielded by independent Martini Racing-sponsored Jolly Club for the 1992 season. Thanks to the two factory-backed privateer teams, Lancia won its sixth and final consecutive Constructor's World Rally Championship. These were to be the final homologation cars; the catalytic 1993 Evoluzione 2 was not developed by the factory into a rally car.

The Evoluzione's engine was the same turbocharged 16-valve two-litre used on the previous model, but power had increased to 210 PS (154 kW; 207 hp) at 5,750 rpm, chiefly thanks to a new, single outlet 60 mm diameter exhaust system. Maximum torque was unchanged at 31 kgf⋅m (300 N⋅m; 220 lbf⋅ft), but was now reached at a higher, 3,500 rpm. An eight-valve "kat" catalytic converter-equipped variant, with an unchanged 177 PS output, continued to be produced for countries where such equipment was mandatory. Mechanical changes included a strengthened steering rack and a power steering oil cooler. The suspension was reworked and strengthened, e.g. using box section track control arms. Front strut towers were raised, which necessitated an aluminium strut brace. The braking system featured larger diameter discs and vacuum servo, and fixed two-piston Brembo calipers at the front. No changes were made to the four-wheel-drive system.

Front and rear tracks were wider than on earlier Deltas, by 54 and 60 mm (2.1 and 2.4 in) respectively. The wheel arch bulges were consequently extended and made more rounded. They were now made in a single pressing, rather than welded on as they previously were. Besides the aforementioned wings, the Evoluzione bodywork included a new bonnet, front and rear bumpers, box section side skirts, rear doors, and a rear spoiler. The front end was distinguished by twin, smaller diameter round headlamps—with the outboard pair, the dipped beams, being of the novel projector type. The bonnet had a wider and taller hump, and new lateral air slats to further assist underbonnet ventilation. The roof spoiler above the tailgate was manually adjustable in three positions—lowered, raised or fully raised via two included brackets—favouring either Cd or rear axle downforce. New five-bolt 7½Jx15-inch Speedline Montecarlo alloy wheels, with the same design of those used on the rally cars, wore 205/50 tyres. Other outside changes were new windscreen wipers with integrated spoilers, a sports-type gas cap, and new yellow HF badges, decorated with the traditional red elephant used on Lancia HF cars of the past.

Paint options included three solid colours (white, rosso Monza (red) and lord blue), and extra-cost metallescente mica colours (black, madras blue, winner red and derby green). Inside the cabin there was a new leather-covered Momo Corse sports steering wheel. Interior trim was otherwise unchanged from the 1990 model HF Integrale 16v. The standard seat interior was done in a combination of dark grey Alcantara and grey velour with diagonal coloured stripes. If the Recaro anatomic seats (which came as standard on some markets) were ordered, upholstery was in perforated Alcantara (either green with white, grey and black exterior colours, or dark grey with all others) or, at extra cost, in black perforated leather. Notable options were a six-way Bosch anti-lock braking system, an electric metal sunroof, and air conditioning. Some of these features were standard on some markets.

Starting in late 1992 assembly of the Evoluzione was contracted to Maggiora, a body panel supplier for Fiat which became a car manufacturer. Maggiora took over part of the recently shuttered Lancia Chivasso plant and restarted production on 16 October 1992.

==== Delta HF integrale "Evoluzione II" ====
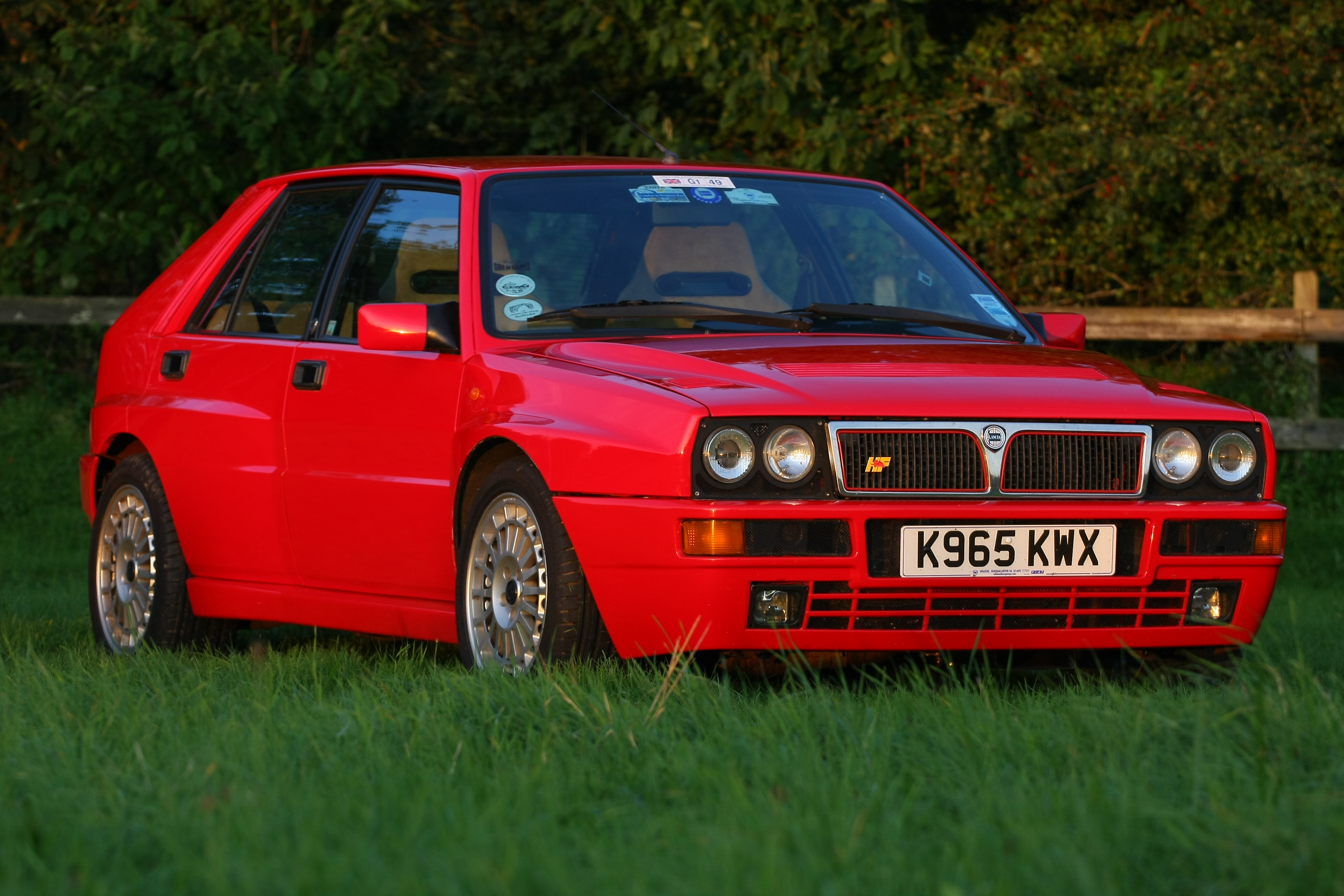
Lancia Delta HF integrale 16v Evoluzione II

Presented in June 1993, the second Evolution version of the Delta HF Integrale featured an updated version of the two-litre 16-valve turbo engine with more power, as well as a three-way catalyst and Lambda probe. A Marelli integrated engine control system with an 8 MHz clock frequency was installed, incorporating:

- Timed sequential multipoint injection
- Self-adapting injection times
- Automatic idling control
- Engine protection strategies depending on the temperature of intaken air
- Mapped ignition with two double outlet coils
- Three-way catalyst and pre-catalyst with lambda probe (oxygen sensor) on the turbine outlet link
- Anti-evaporation system with air line for canister flushing optimised for the turbo engine
- New Garrett turbocharger: water-cooled with boost-drive management i.e. boost controlled by feedback from the central control unit on the basis of revs/throttle angle
- Knock control by engine block sensor and new signal handling software for spark park advance, fuel quantity injected, and turbocharging

The engine developed 215 PS (158 kW; 212 hp) DIN (against 210 PS on the earlier non-catalytic version) and maximum torque of 32 kgf·m (314 N·m) (formerly 31 kgf·m or 300 N·m).

The 1993 Integrale received a cosmetic and functional facelift that included:

- New 16" light alloy rims with 205/45 ZR 16 tyres;
- Body colour roof moulding to underline the connection between the roof and the Solar control windows;
- Aluminium fuel cap and air-intake grilles on the front mudguards;
- Red-painted cylinder head;
- New leather-covered three-spoke MOMO steering wheel.
- Standard high-back Recaro sport seats.

With ABS, fog lamps and Recaro seats now standard on all markets, the sole optional extra was air conditioning. The choice of paint finishes was reduced to just three solid colours: bianco (white), rosso Monza (red) and blu Lancia (dark blue). Interior upholstery was always done in beige Alcantara with diagonal stitching on seat centres and door panels. Additional colour and trim combinations were made available through a number of limited editions.

==== Limited editions and specials ====
Lancia produced several limited and numbered editions models based on the Delta HF Integrale "Evoluzione", each offering unique exterior and interior colours, materials and equipment. Some were put on general sale, while others were reserved to specific markets, owners clubs or selected customers. The following table lists all of the limited editions and their main features.

Lancia Delta HF Integrale limited editions
Name	Image	Intr. date	Base model	Paint colour	Special exterior features	Production and notes
Name	Image	Intr. date	Base model	Upholstery	Special interior features	Production and notes
Martini 5		01/1992	"Evo"	white	special Martini livery; black spoiler and bonnet vents; white-painted wheels	Celebrating five consecutive WRC titles. 400 made.
Martini 5		01/1992	"Evo"	black Alcantara with red stitching	high back Recaro seats; red seat belts	Celebrating five consecutive WRC titles. 400 made.
Club Italia		1992	"Evo"	dark blue	club badges on wings; white "Club Italia" scripts	Reserved to Club Italia members. 15 made.
Club Italia		1992	"Evo"	bordeaux red leather	high back Recaro seats; racing-style gear shifter with CFRP console trim and black metal round knob, special bushings; push-button engine start	Reserved to Club Italia members. 15 made.
"Verde York"		1992	"Evo"	dark green	—	602 made.
"Verde York"		1992	"Evo"	beige leather with green stitching	high back Recaro seats	602 made.
Martini 6		12/1992	"Evo"	white	special Martini livery; white-painted wheels	Celebrating six consecutive WRC titles. 310 made.
Martini 6		12/1992	"Evo"	turquoise Alcantara with red stitching	high back Recaro seats; red seat belts; gear shifter as on Club Italia	Celebrating six consecutive WRC titles. 310 made.
"Giallo Ginestra"		10/1993	"Evo 2"	broom yellow	—	220 made. Allocation: 150 Italy, 50 Germany, 20 France.
"Giallo Ginestra"		10/1993	"Evo 2"	black Alcantara with yellow stitching	high back Recaro seats	220 made. Allocation: 150 Italy, 50 Germany, 20 France.
"Bianco Perlato"		1993	"Evo 2"	pearl white	grey side pinstripe	365 made.
"Bianco Perlato"		1993	"Evo 2"	blue leather	high back Recaro seats; blue leather steering wheel and shifter boot; blue carpeting	365 made.
"Blu Lagos"		1994	"Evo 2"	metallic blue	yellow side pinstripe	215 made.
"Blu Lagos"		1994	"Evo 2"	straw yellow leather	high back Recaro seats	215 made.
Club Hi.Fi.		4/1994	"Evo 2"	Monza red or Lancia blue	yellow-blue-yellow stripe; club badges on wings	Reserved to Club Hi.Fi. members. 20 made.
Club Hi.Fi.		4/1994	"Evo 2"	black or beige leather	high back Recaro seats; colour-matched luggage	Reserved to Club Hi.Fi. members. 20 made.
Club Lancia		1994	"Evo 2"	Monza red or Lancia blue	yellow-blue-yellow stripe; club badges on wings	Reserved to Club Lancia members. 7 made.
Club Lancia		1994	"Evo 2"	black or beige leather	high back Recaro seats	Reserved to Club Lancia members. 7 made.
Dealers collection		1994	"Evo 2"	pearl red	—	Reserved to Lancia dealers. 180 made.
Dealers collection		1994	"Evo 2"	beige leather	high back Recaro seats; aluminium instrument panel surround; push-button engine start (different from the Club Italia one)	Reserved to Lancia dealers. 180 made.
Edizione finale		1994	"Evo 2"	Amaranto (dark red)	yellow-blue-yellow stripe; black bonnet vents; black mesh grille; CFRP fuel cap; special badging front and rear; dark grey-painted wheels; rear strut bar in addition to the standard front one	Japanese market only. Livery from the Lancia Fulvia HF. 250 made.
Edizione finale		1994	"Evo 2"	black Alcantara and cloth	As Dealers Collection, plus: CFRP steering wheel centre; aluminium pedals; racing-style gear shifter with CFRP console trim and aluminium knob	Japanese market only. Livery from the Lancia Fulvia HF. 250 made.

A notable one-off model was the Lancia Delta Spider Integrale, a two-door convertible built for Fiat president Gianni Agnelli.

After production had finished in 1994, Bruno Maggiora tried to convince Lancia to continue the Delta with a third evolution which was realized in the Delta HF Integrale "Viola", the one and only "Evo 3" car named by its intense violet color. The concept features a new injection system, an IAW P8 ECU and an increase in boost for the Garrett T3 turbocharger, boosting power from 215 to 237 PS (158 to 174 kW) at 6,000 rpm and 236 lb⋅ft (320 N⋅m) of torque. It also features a GKN limited-slip differential, a new clutch for the center differential, a short shift gearchange and revised springs and dampers.

In 2018, a small Italian coachbuilder called Automobili Amos created a modern version of the Delta Integrale, named the Delta Futurista. Power was up to 330 PS (243 kW) and the car itself weighed 1250 kg. Additionally the rear doors were removed, making it a three-door body. Only 20 examples were produced, each costing £270,000.

In 2021, it was announced that FIA World Rallycross Championship team GCK Motorsport were set to revive the Lancia Delta as a modern electric rallycross race car for the 2022 FIA World Rallycross Championship. The car was to be based on a retrofitted road-going electric version of the model called Lancia Delta Evo-e RX. The car made its debut at the final round of the season. For the 2023 season, GCK Motorsport committed to running the car in the championship until 2025. However, both cars were destroyed in a fire on the 21st of July 2023.

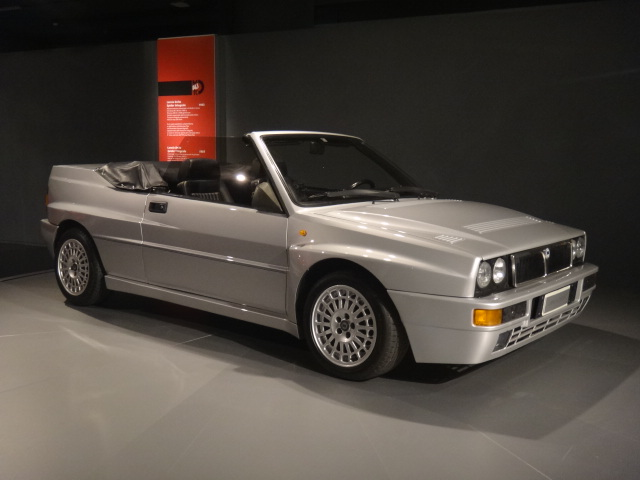
Gianni Agnelli's one-off Delta Spider Integrale on display at Museo Nazionale dell'Automobile

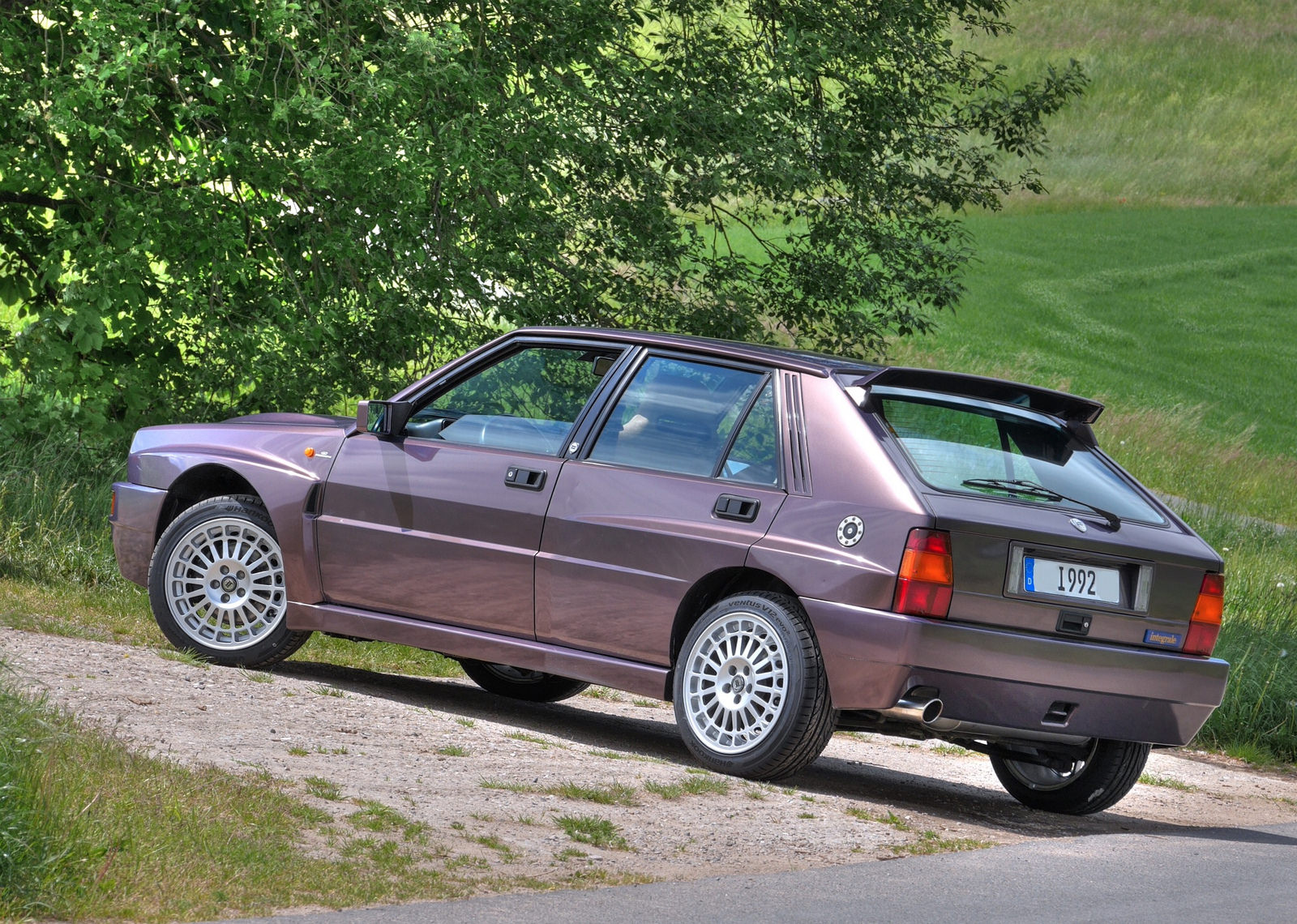
Lancia Delta "Evo 3" Viola, one-off

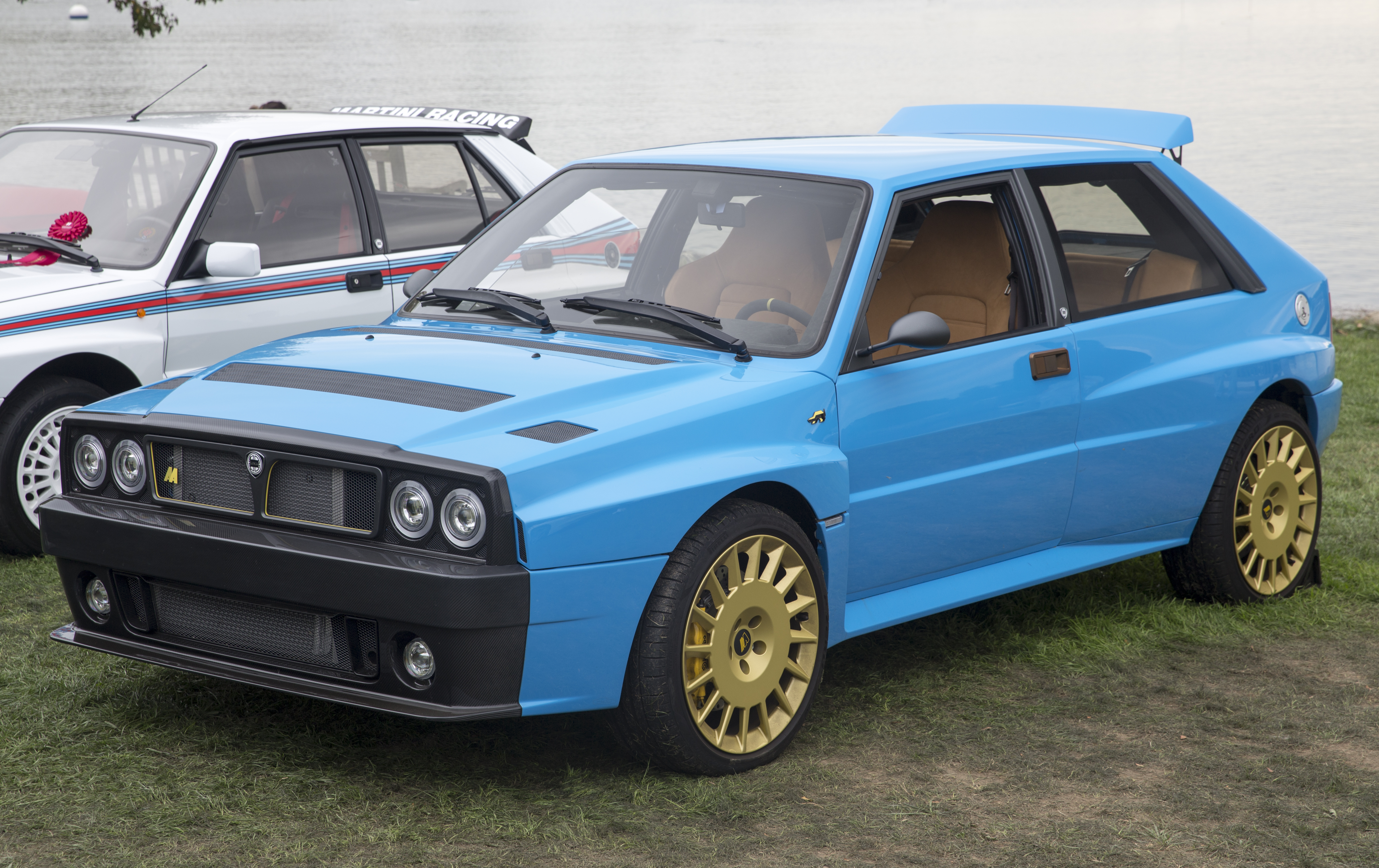
Delta Futurista by Automobili Amos

=== Performance ===
Data and performance of the first generation models:^{,}

Model	Year	Displacement		Power				Torque			Acc. 0–100 km/h (0–62 mph), s	Top speed	
Model	Year	cc	cu in	PS	kW	hp	at rpm	Nm	lbft	at rpm	Acc. 0–100 km/h (0–62 mph), s	km/h	mph
1.1 (Greece only)		1,116	68.1	64	47	63	6000	84	62	3000	—	150	93
1.3		1,301	79.4	75	55	74	5800	105	77	3500	15.0	160	99
1.5		1,498	91.4	85	63	84	5800	123	91	3500	12.5	161	100
1.6 GT		1,585	96.7	105	77	104	5800	136	100	3300	10.0	180	112
1.6 GT.i.e.		1,585	96.7	108	79	107	5900	137	101	3500	9.8	+185	115
1.6 HF turbo	1983	1,585	96.7	130	96	128	5600	191	141	3700		195	121
1.6 HF turbo	1985	1,585	96.7	140	103	138	5500	191	141	3500	8.7	203	126
HF4WD	1986	1,995	121.7	165	121	163	5500	285	210	2750	7.8	208	129
HF integrale 8v	1987	1,995	121.7	185	136	182	5300	304	224	2500	6.6	215	134
HF integrale 16V	1989	1,995	121.7	200	147	197	5500	298	220	3000	5.7	220	137
HF integrale "Evo1"	1991	1,995	121.7	210	154	207	5750	298	220	3500	5.7	220	137
HF integrale "Evo2"	1993	1,995	121.7	215	158	212	5750	314	232	2500	5.7	220	137
1.9 TD		1,929	117.7	80	59	79	4200	172	127	2400	13.8	170	106

=== Rallying ===
The Lancia Delta is one of the most successful rally cars ever, having won the World Rally Championship for manufacturers six times between 1987 and 1992. After the abolition of Group B, following among others the fatal accident of Henri Toivonen while driving a Delta, Lancia was forced, as were all other manufacturers, to compete with Group A cars. The Delta HF4WD was therefore pressed into service for the 1987 season. Despite some flaws it was more suitable for rallying than its rivals and easily won the 1987 championship. The Delta's dominance helped it out in the Italian market at least, where a 42% sales increase in the first half of 1987 was directly attributed to its rallying successes.

Competitors began to emerge during 1988, in response to whom Lancia produced first the Delta Integrale, and then in 1989 the Integrale 16v, which remained competitive until 1991 and netted the team four more world championships. The Evoluzione Delta was introduced for 1992 and won the championship for a record sixth year in succession, before Lancia withdrew from the sport at the end of an unsuccessful 1993 season. Lancia drivers won the drivers' title in 1987, 1988, 1989 and 1991. The four evolutions of the Delta won 46 world championship events between them, and their run of six successive manufacturers' championships remains a world record.

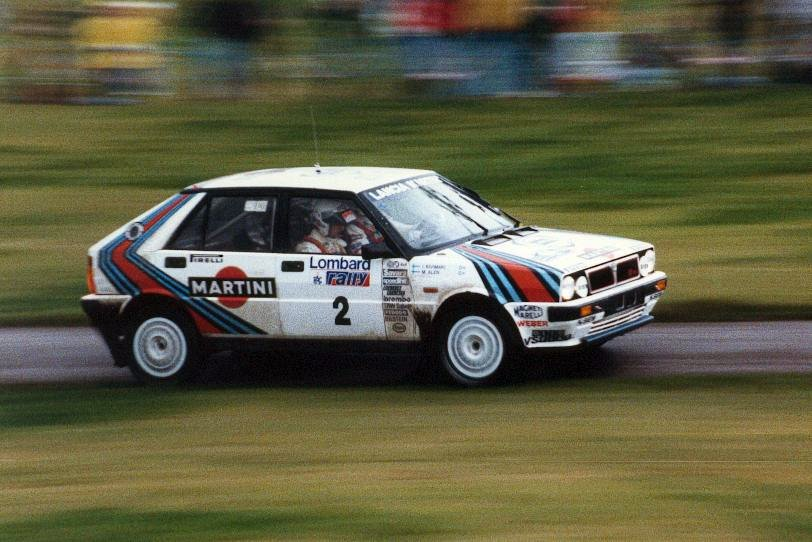
Markku Alén at the 1987 RAC Rally

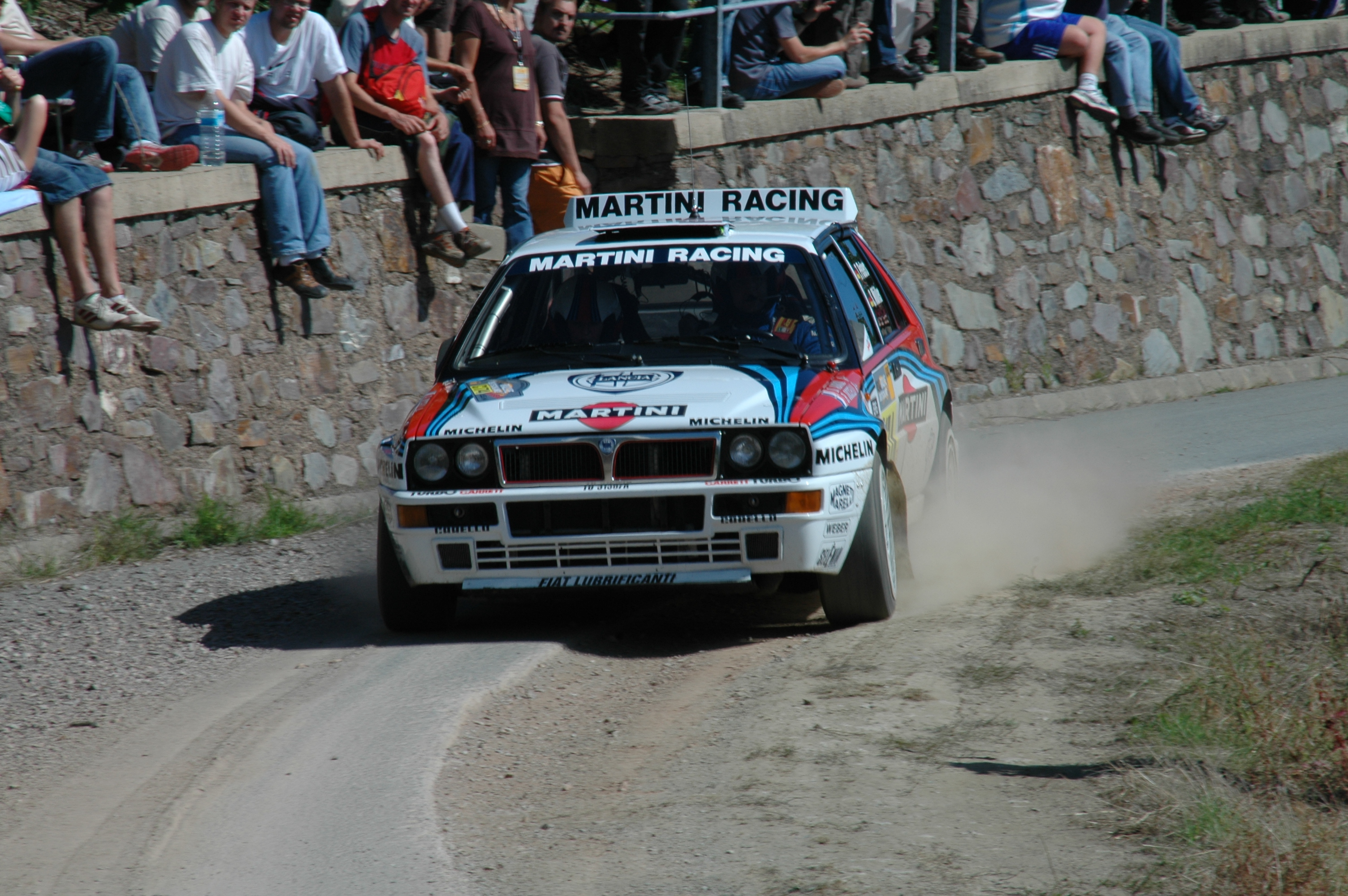
Lancia Delta HF integrale - 2007 Rallye Deutschland

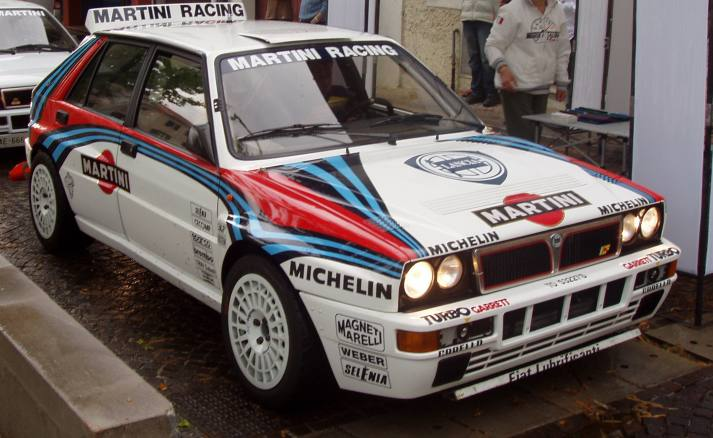
Lancia Delta HF integrale Evoluzione

=== Saab-Lancia 600 ===
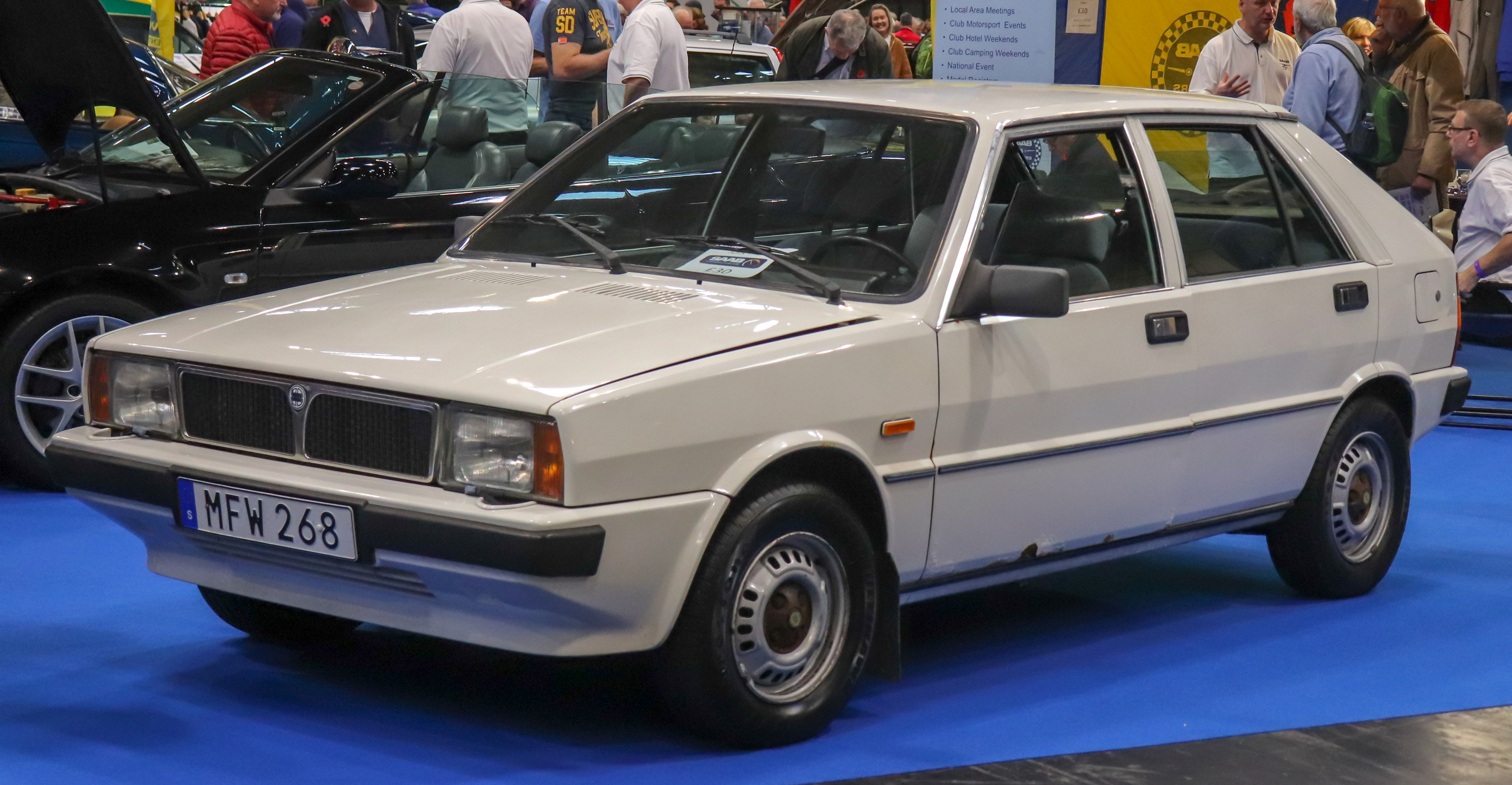
1986 SAAB-Lancia 600

The Saab-Lancia 600 is a rebadged Lancia Delta, sold by Saab in Northern Europe after a deal with Lancia.

The deal was a part of the 1980s co-operation between the Swedish car manufacturer Saab and the Italian Fiat Group, which includes Lancia and Alfa Romeo in addition to Fiat. The partnership also resulted in the Type 4 project, which provided the common platforms for the Saab 9000, the Lancia Thema, the Fiat Croma and the Alfa Romeo 164.

The 600 was developed because Saab did not have the finances to support the production of entirely new models and looked to other companies in order to replace the compact 96 in their lineup.

The first years it was sold as GLS and the exclusive GLE, but due to poor sales because of the high price the GLE-model did not last long. The 600 was offered only with the 1.5-litre engine that had 85 PS (63 kW), connected to a five-speed manual gearbox.

The Saab-Lancia 600 was designed by Giorgetto Giugiaro and, in common with the company's other models, was a front-wheel drive and a hatchback, with a rallying pedigree. The Saab-Lancia 600 version was sold only in Sweden, Finland, and Norway. The last cars were sold in early 1987; Saab then stopped importing Lancias to Sweden and the local Fiat importer took over from 1 January 1988.

Due to the harsh weather conditions of northern Europe, Saab developed their own heater and made changes to the rust protection, one of a few minor modification from the Lancia design. The 600 also received thermostatically controlled intake air preheating and a semi-automatic choke. Nonetheless, the 600 experienced severe and well publicized rust problems in Scandinavia and removed many cars from the road. Rust problems also shortened the service life of the few 600s briefly operated by the Swedish Police.

The car is very rare today. In 2012, of the 6,419 Saab-Lancias that were produced for the Swedish market, only 159 survived and only 12 were on the road.

=== Lancia Hyena ===
Lancia Hyena
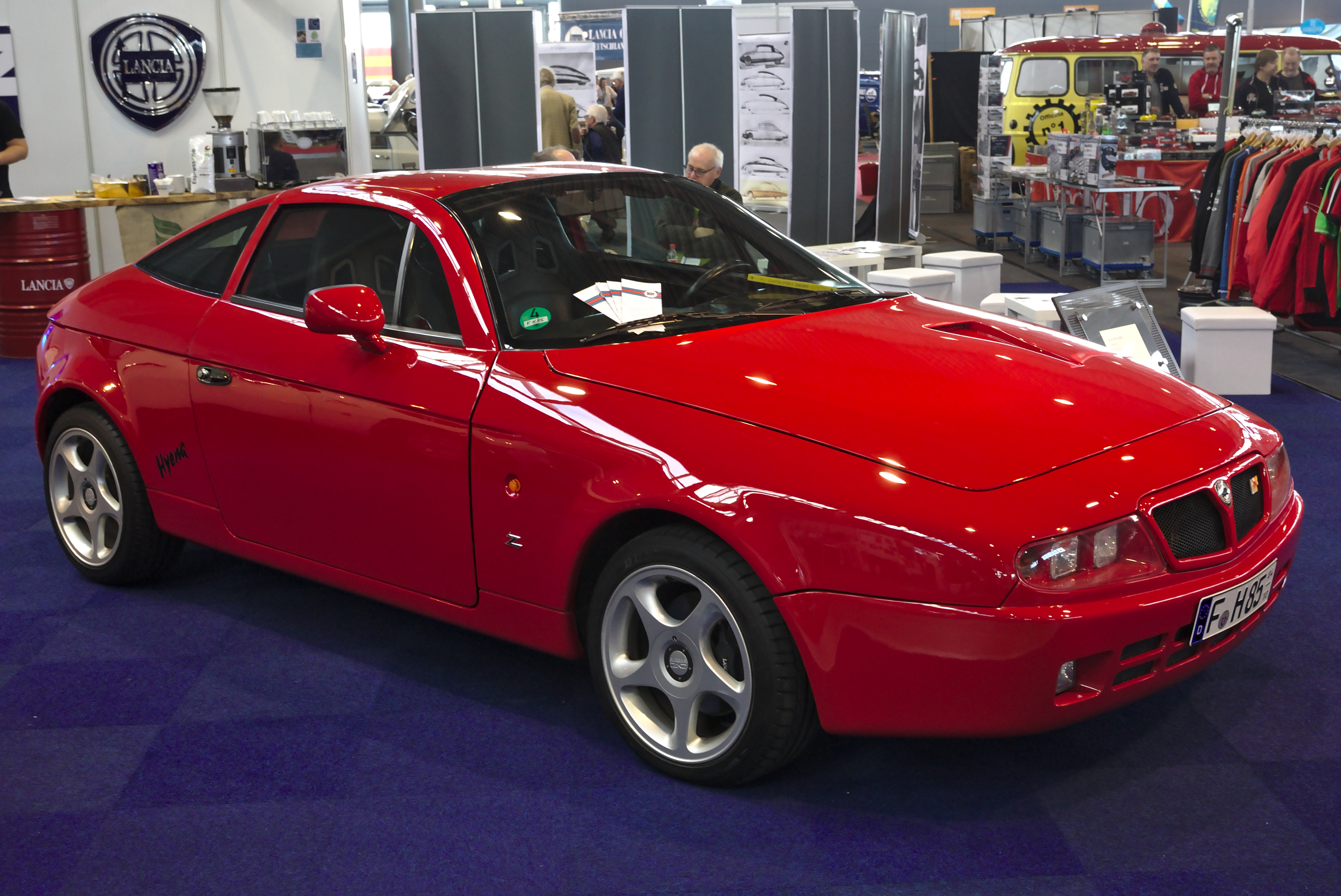

Overview
- Manufacturer: Zagato
- Production: 1992–1996; 24 made
- Assembly: Italy: Milan, Rho
- Designer: Marco Pedracini at Zagato

Body and chassis
- Class: Sports car (S)
- Body style: 2-door coupé
- Layout: Transverse front-engine, four-wheel drive
- Related: Lancia Delta integrale "Evoluzione"

Powertrain
- Engine: 2.0 L turbocharged I4
- Transmission: 5-speed manual

The Lancia Hyena was a two-door coupé made in small numbers by Italian coachbuilder Zagato on the basis of the Delta HF integrale "Evoluzione".

The Hyena was born thanks to the initiative of Dutch classic car restorer and collector Paul V.J. Koot, who desired a coupé version of the HF integrale as a road car. He turned to Zagato, where the Hyena was designed in 1990 by Marco Pedracini. A first style model was introduced at the Brussels Motor Show in January 1992. A first prototype was shown on the Paris Motor Show in October 1993.

After the Brussels show, Koot received an order for 10 cars for the Japanese market, and 3 cars for the EU market, and sales had hardly begun. Thus, the decision was taken to put the Hyena into limited production at Zagato. Fiat approved this, but large bureaucratic barriers became apparent to supply bare HF integrale rolling chassis. This threatened to delay the whole project for years, or even to make it impossible. Koot thus decided to produce the Hyena from fully finished HF integrales, purchased through the official Dutch Lancia importer LANIM at the time. Koot's Lusso Service Holland took care of procuring and stripping the donor cars in the Netherlands; they were then sent to Zagato in Milan to have the new body built and for final assembly. All of this made the Hyena expensive to build and they were sold for around 140,000 Swiss francs or $100,000 .

A production run of 75 examples was initially planned, but only 24 Hyenas were completed between 1992 and 1995.

=== History ===
==== Specifications ====
The Zagato bodywork made use of aluminium alloys over a lighter steel structure, and composite materials for the doors, outer sills and bumpers. The stifness of the new platform/structure combination was improved 50% when compared with the standard Delta Integrale structure. The interior featured new dashboards, consoles and door cards made entirely from carbon fibre, produced by the MOC company in France. Thanks to these weight saving measures the Hyena was 150 kilograms (330 lb) lighter than the original HF integrale, about 15% of its overall weight. The two-litre turbo engine was upgraded from 205 to 250 PS (184 kW), and the car could accelerate from 0–100 km/h (62 mph) in 5.4 seconds.

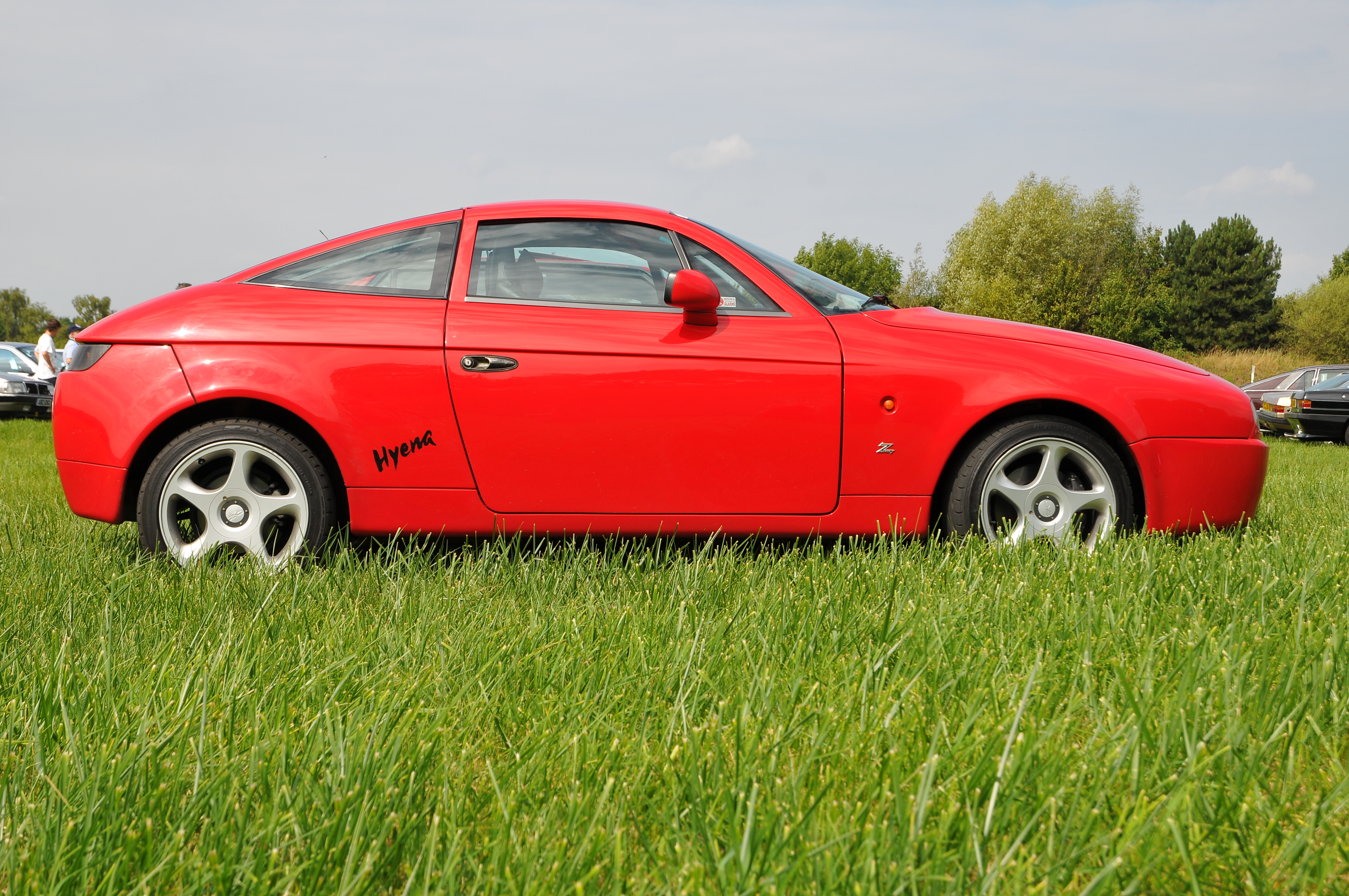
Side view

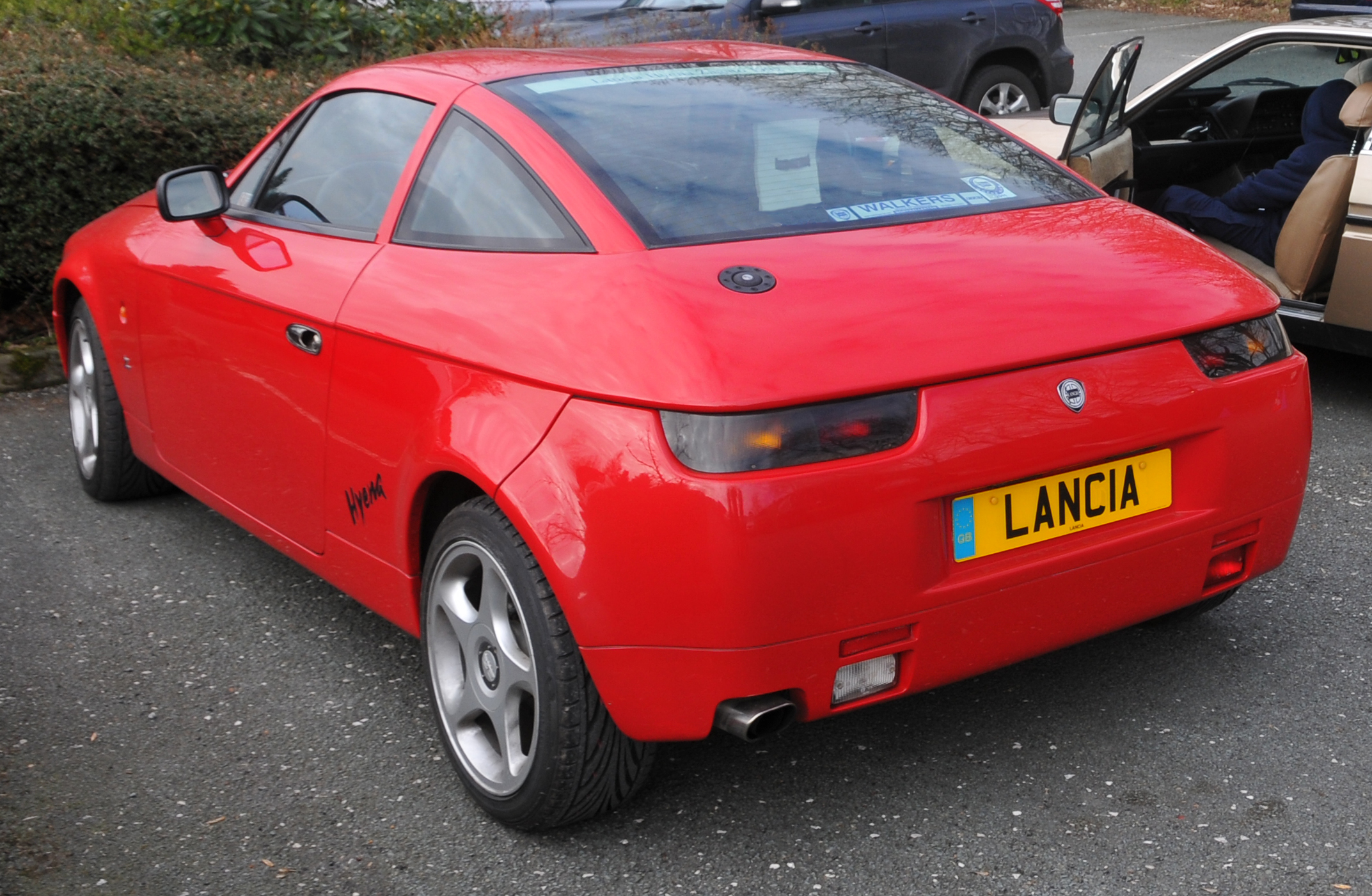
Rear view

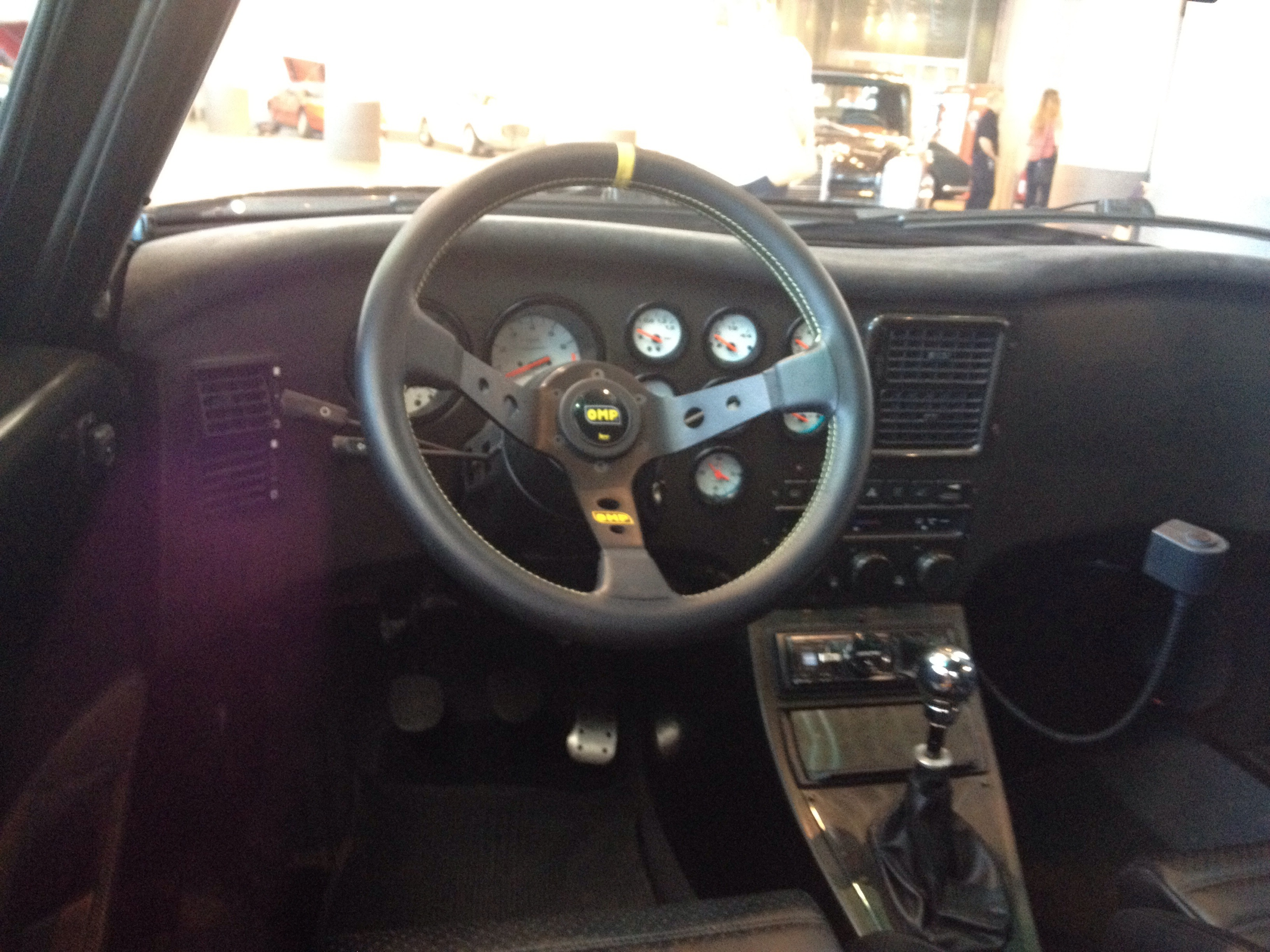
The interior made use of composite materials.

=== Concept cars ===
==== Italdesign Orca ====
The Orca was a concept car with an aerodynamic five-door fastback body by Italdesign Giugiaro, unveiled at the April 1982 Turin Motor Show; it was based on the Delta platform, with a turbocharged engine and four-wheel-drive which could be disengaged at speed. The concept's goal was to combine a highly aerodynamic shape (drag coefficient of Cd=0.245) with outstanding passenger room for its size.

==== Lancia HIT ====
The Lancia HIT (standing for "high Italian technology") was a concept car with 2+2 coupé body by Pininfarina unveiled at the April 1988 Turin Motor Show. It was based on the mechanicals of the Delta HF integrale, and bodied using cold-glued carbon fibre sandwich panels.

== Second generation ==
Second generation
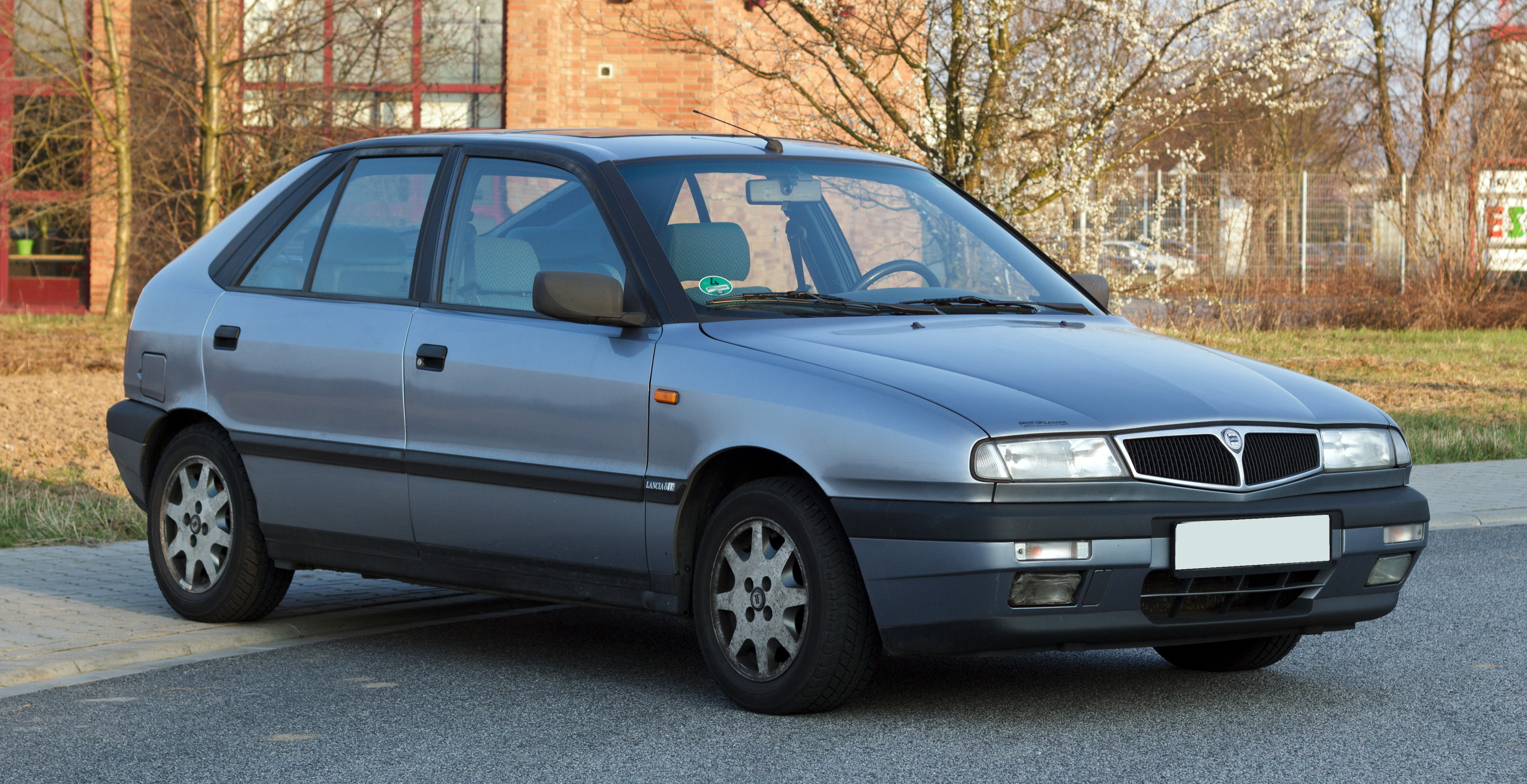

Overview
- Production: 1993–1999
- Assembly: Italy: Naples, Pomigliano d'Arco (Alfa Romeo Pomigliano d'Arco)
- Designer: Ercole Spada at I.DE.A Institute

Body and chassis
- Body style: 5-door hatchback; 3-door hatchback (HPE)
- Layout: Transverse front-engine, front-wheel-drive
- Platform: Type Two (Tipo Due)
- Related: Fiat Tipo; Fiat Tempra; Lancia Dedra; Alfa Romeo 145 and 146

Powertrain
- Engine: Petrol: 1.4 L Fiat Torque 8V I4; 1.6 L Fiat Torque 8/16V I4; 1.8 L Fiat Twin Cam 8V I4; 1.8 L Family B 16V I4; 2.0 L Fiat Twin Cam 16V I4; 2.0 L Fiat Twin Cam 16V turbo I4; Diesel: 1.9 L TD 8V turbo I4
- Transmission: 5-speed manual

Dimensions
- Wheelbase: 2,540 mm (100.0 in)
- Length: 4,011 mm (157.9 in)
- Width: 1,703 mm (67.0 in) (5-door); 1,759 mm (69.3 in) (HF and HPE)
- Height: 1,430 mm (56.3 in)
- Kerb weight: 1,130–1,330 kg (2,491–2,932 lb)

The successor to the original Delta, the "Nuova Delta" (Tipo 836) — always referred to by Lancia as Lancia δ with the lower-case Greek letter — was introduced in 1993 and remained in production until 1999. It was designed at Turinese design and engineering studio I.DE.A Institute by Ercole Spada. Based on the tipo Due platform of the Fiat Tipo, the Nuova Delta was targeted at customers interested in comfort and convenience. No four-wheel drive second generation Deltas were produced; the most powerful HF performance variants with up to 193 PS (142 kW; 190 hp) remained front-wheel drive.

=== History ===
The first generation Delta had been given a second lease on life by its rallying successes, but by the 1990s it was over ten years old and due for replacement; its four-door saloon sibling, the Prisma, had already been replaced by the Lancia Dedra. Development and tooling work for the Tipo 836 Delta lasted five years and, according to a statement by Fiat CEO Paolo Cantarella, required an investment of 700 billion Lire. Projected sales numbers were 60,000 a year, half of them exports.

==== Launch ====
The second generation Delta's world première was held at the March 1993 Geneva Motor Show, alongside that of the final "Evo 2" HF Integrale. Sales commenced in May.

Initially the Nuova Delta was offered with three engines and outputs varying from 76 to 142 PS (56 to 104 kW; 75 to 140 hp): an entry level SOHC 1.6-litre, and two DOHC inline fours with Lancia's twin counter rotating balance shafts, an eight-valve 1.8 L and a 16-valve 2.0 L. Trim level were three: base and LE for the 1.6 and 1.8, base and richer LS for two-litre models. The sportier 2.0 HF was also unveiled in Geneva, and went on sale in September; it used a version of the 16-valve 2.0 L equipped with a Garrett T3 turbocharger and an intercooler to produce 186 PS (137 kW; 183 hp). Mechanical changes from the other Deltas included upsized 205/50 tyres, stiffer suspension, standard 4-way ABS, a "Viscodrive" viscous coupling limited-slip differential and, in the HF LS trim, electronically adjustable dampers with two settings. Visually the HF turbo was set apart by an eggcrate grille with a gunmetal surround and a yellow HF badge, a sportier front bumper complementing 28 mm (1.1 in) wider front wings, black side skirts, specific 15 inch seven-spoke alloy wheels and a spoiler at the base of the rear window. Larger disk brakes and optional Alcantara Recaro sport seats were shared with the 2.0 LS.

Portuguese buyers were given an additional option at the bottom of the range: a fuel-injected 1.4-litre engine, producing 71 PS (52 kW), to suit that country's tax laws. Thanks to very short gearing, the 1.4 actually had a quicker 0–100 km/h (62 mph) time than the larger 1.6, albeit this also meant a much lower top speed and higher fuel consumption. About a year after the launch, in June 1994, the 1.9 turbo ds turbodiesel variant was added to the range; it was powered by the usual 1,929 cc SOHC unit, pushing out 90 PS (66 kW; 89 hp). The turbo ds was given the flared fenders and bumper of the HF, and was available in base and LE trim. Presented a month later and put on sale in autumn, the Delta 2.0 GT paired the naturally aspirated two-litre engine with the looks of the HF—flared fenders, bumper and spoiler.

==== HPE ====
Despite a three-door having been rumoured since 1991, until 1995 only a five-door hatchback bodystyle was offered. At the 1995 Geneva Motor Show the three-door was introduced, christened HPE—a denomination that had previously been used for a shooting brake variant of the Lancia Beta, and standing for "high performance executive". At first the HPE was only available with the three top engines: 2.0 16v, 1.9 turbodiesel and 2.0 16v turbo in HF guise. The three-door bodyshell had entirely redesigned body sides, but retained the roof and rear section of the five-door model; rear wheelarch flares complemented the HF-derived wide front wings and bumper, sported by all HPE versions. This meant the HPE was around 6 cm (2.4 in) wider than a standard Delta, while all other exterior dimensions remained unchanged. Styling differences from the five-door included specific side skirts and a body-colour grille, to which the HPE 2.0 HF added all the accoutrements of the five-door HF and additional air intakes under the headlights.

==== 1996 revisions ====
At the beginning of 1996 the range was updated. All naturally aspirated engines were replaced; the 1.6 and 1.8 8-valve by 16-valve units, while the 2.0 16v was discontinued in favour of a 1.8 16v equipped with variable valve timing.

Trim levels for the five-door were now three: base LE, richer LX and GT, exclusive to the 1.8 V.V.T. engine. The three-door HF turbo remained the only one offered, as the five-door version was discontinued. In addition to the turbocharged engines, the HPE was available with 1.8 V.V.T. and also the smaller, 1.6 L, engines; the latter, entry level HPE adopted the bumper and narrow front wings of the standard Delta. Minor styling changes were introduced, such as alloy wheels and wheel covers of a new design, chrome vertical bars to the five-door cars' grille, and body colour mirror caps.

==== 1997 revisions ====
November 1997 brought the last revisions for the Delta. Seven models made up the updated range: five-door and HPE with a choice of 1.6, 1.8 V.V.T. or 1.9 td engines—the 2.0 16v having been phased out—and a renewed 2.0 HF, again in HPE form only. The 5-door range was reduced to a single LS trim. More of the plastic exterior details were now painted in body colour, namely bumper, bodyside and C-pillar inserts. All HPEs donned flared front wings. The updated HPE 2.0 HF was shown at the Bologna Motor Show in November. Visually it continued the monochrome theme of the restyled cars, and it was made more distinctive by bumpers, side skirts, and spoiler of a new design, and 16 inch Speedline Montecarlo alloy wheels with 215/50 tyres; inside the seats were upholstered in black leather with contrasting colour Alcantara centres. Mechanically it received a tweaked engine, producing 193 PS (142 kW; 190 hp), which made for a 5 km/h higher top speed.

The Delta was dropped from Lancia's lineup in 1999 with no immediate successor, after nearly 139,000 units had been produced. The related but more successful Dedra saloon was replaced at the same time by the Lybra, a compact executive car not offered with a hatchback bodystyle.

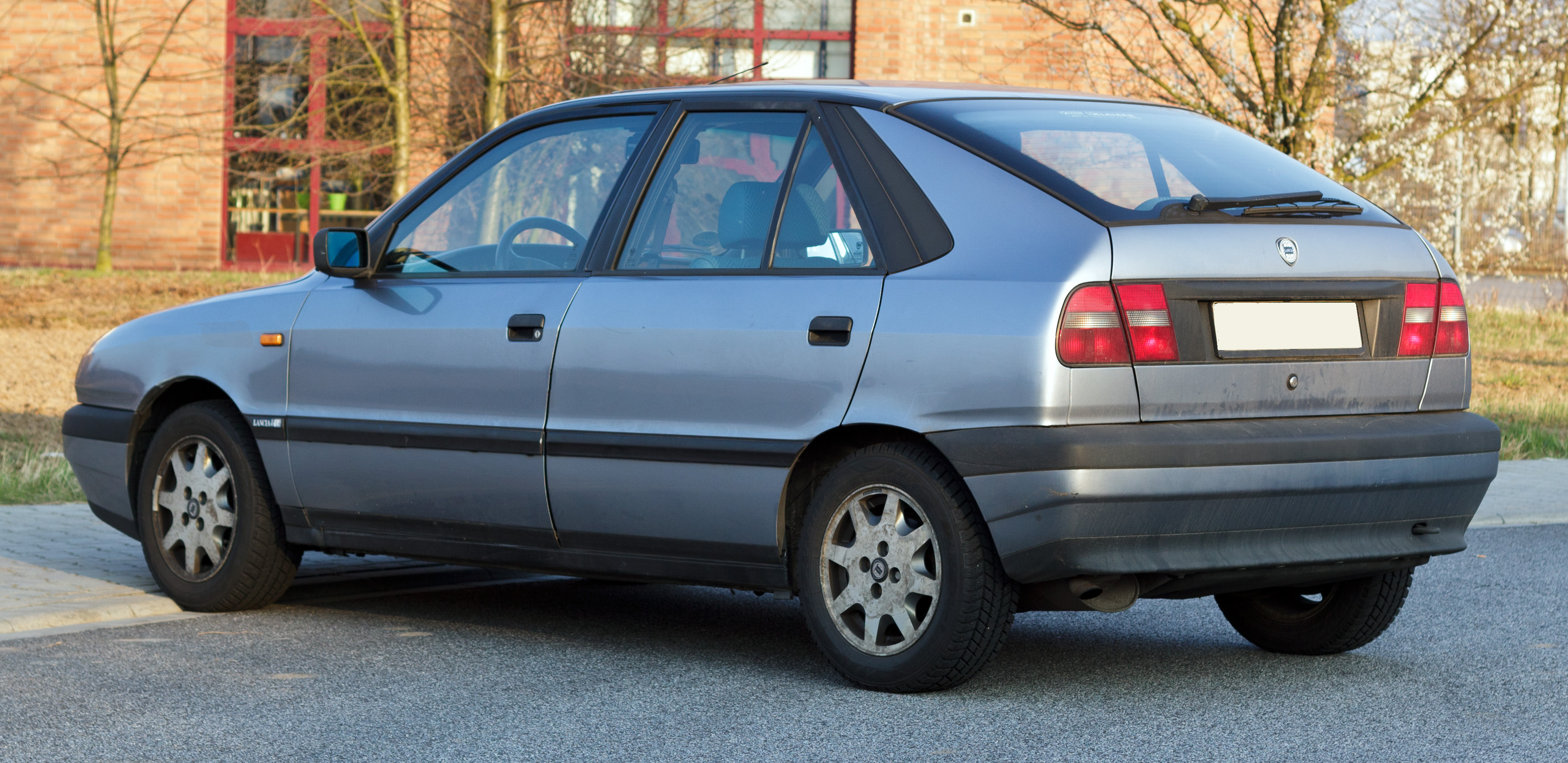
Rear three-quarter view of an early five-door model

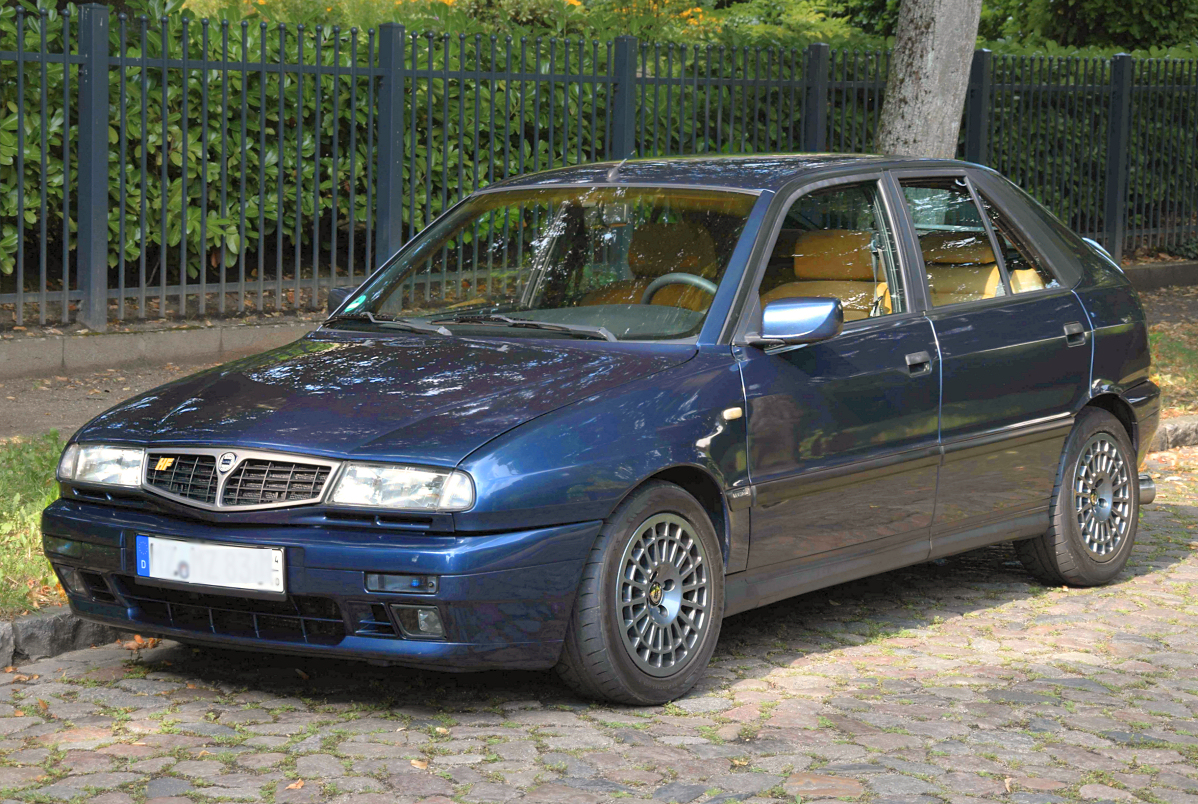
1994 Lancia Delta HF 2.0 Turbo LS

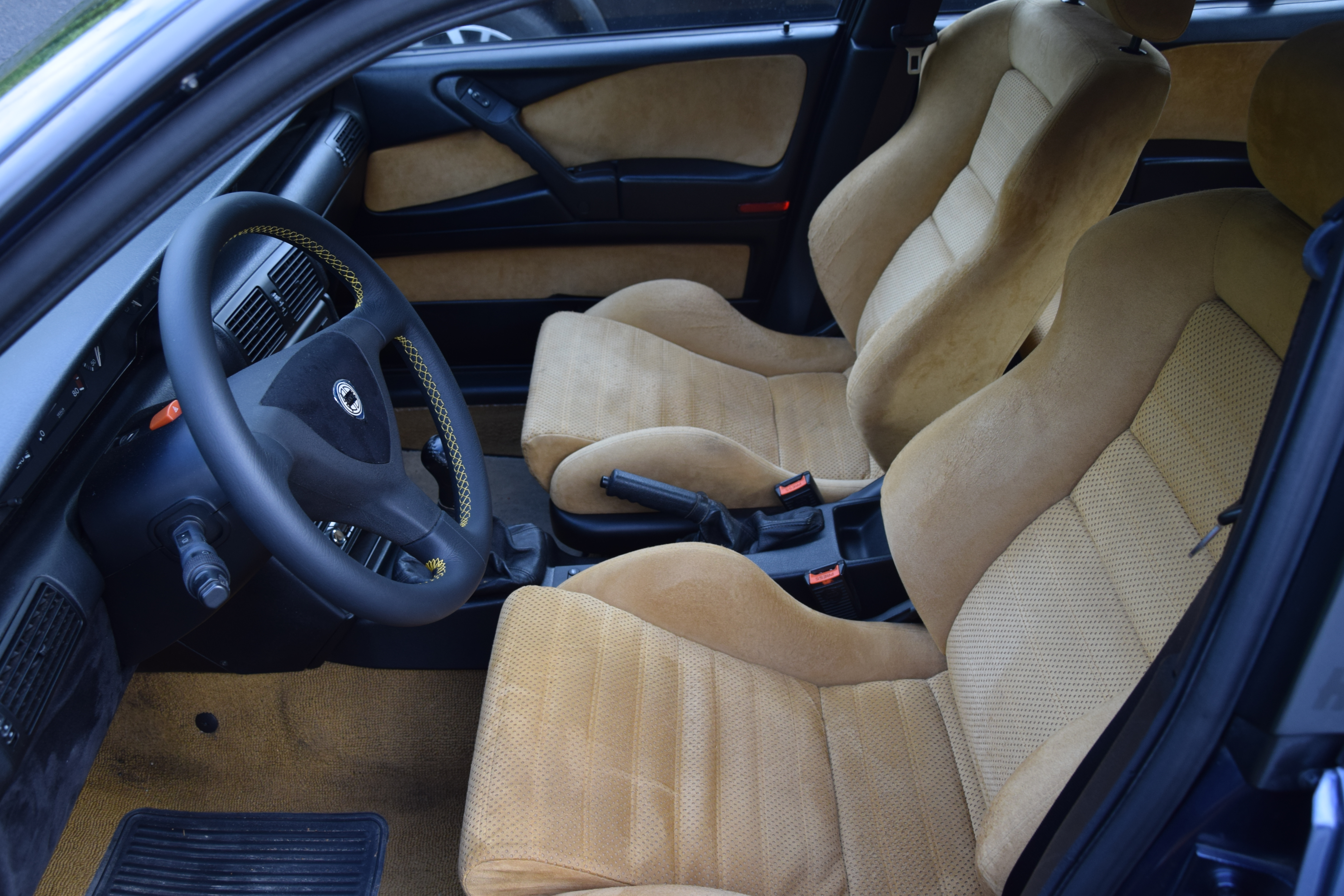
1994 Lancia Delta HF 2.0 Turbo LS interior

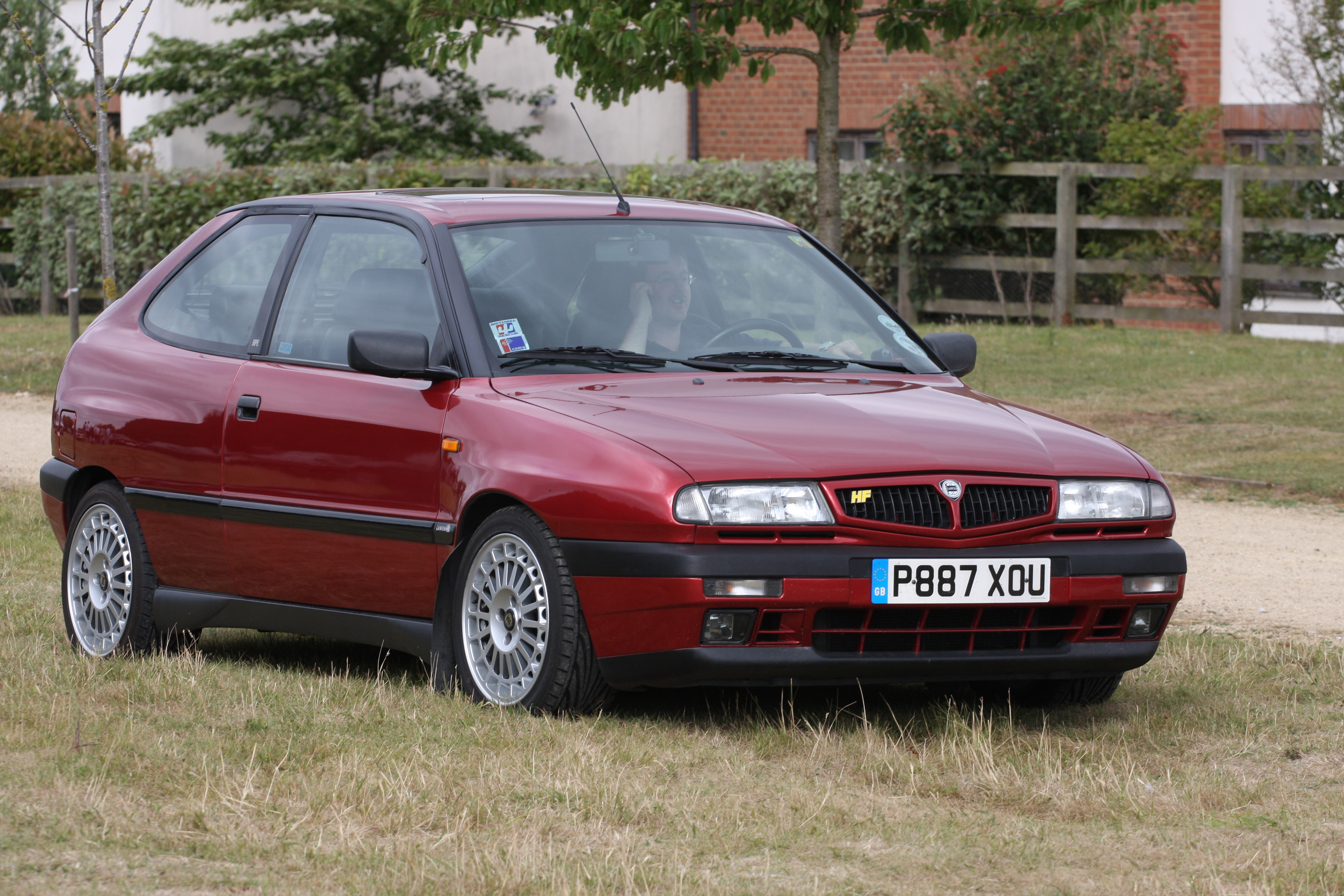
1996–97 Lancia Delta HPE 2.0 HF

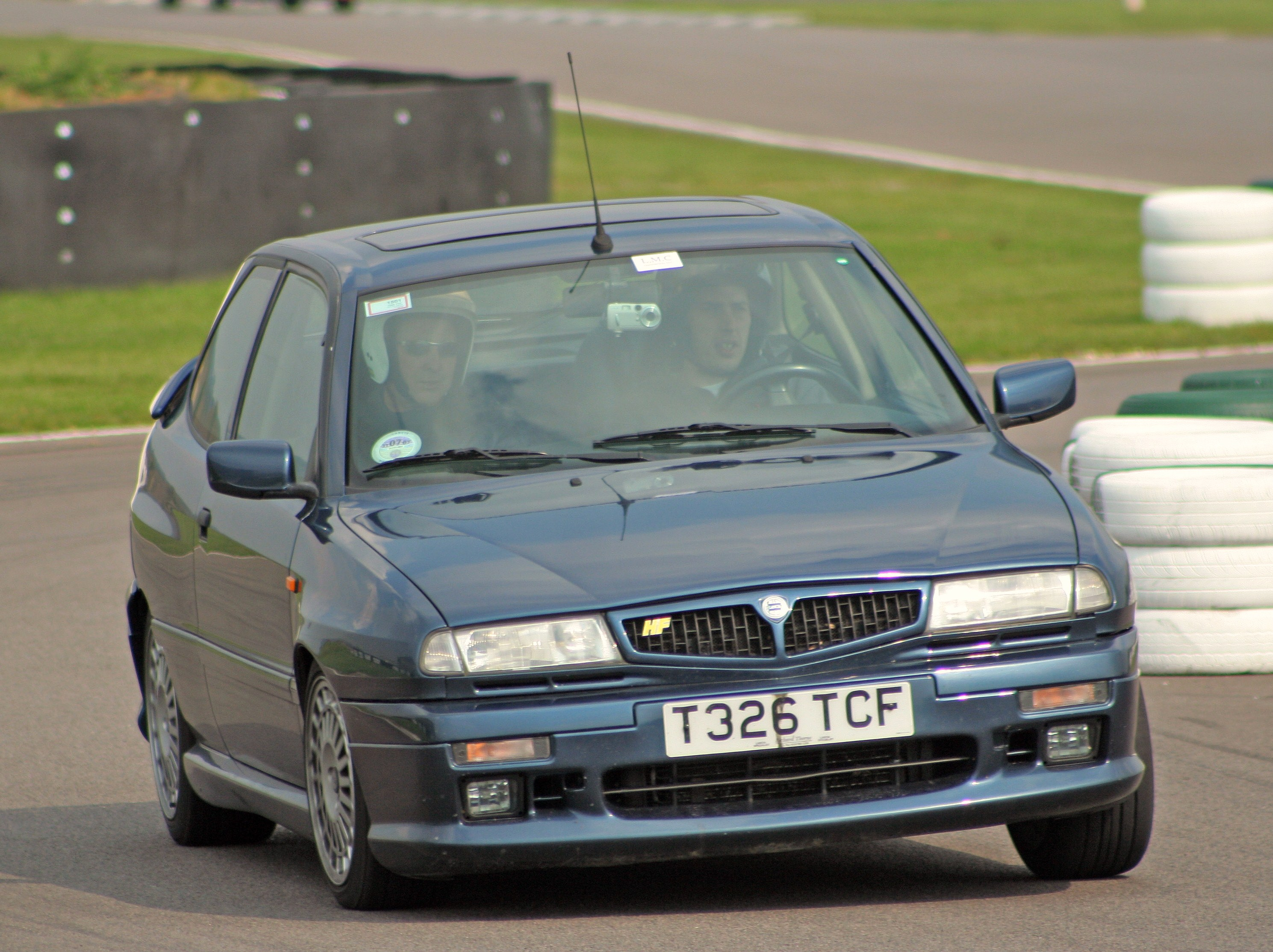
1997–1999 Lancia Delta HPE 2.0 HF

=== Specifications ===
Being based on Fiat's Tipo 2 architecture, the second generation Delta featured a steel unibody construction, transverse engine, and all-independent suspension. At the front these were of the MacPherson strut type—the lower arms linked to the same subframe which supported the drivetrain—with coaxial coil springs and telescopic dampers, and an anti-roll bar; at the rear there were trailing arms (also connected to the body by a subframe), an anti-roll bar, coil springs and telescopic dampers. Steering was rack and pinion with standard hydraulic power steering. Brakes were discs on all four wheels, except for base 1.6 cars which used drums at the rear. All models used a five-speed gearbox and were front-wheel drive.

==== Engines ====
Model	Prod. period	Layout	Displacement	Valvetrain	Fuel and intake systems	Peak power PS (kW bhp)	Peak torque Nm (lbft)	Top speed km/h (mph)	Acc. 0–100 km/h (0–62 mph), s
Petrol engines
1.4 i.e. (Note: Portugal only)	1994–99	I4	1,372 cc	SOHC 8v	Monomotronic SPI	71 (52; 70) at 6,000 rpm	106 (78) at 3,000 rpm	158 (98)	12.8
1.6 i.e.	1993–96	I4	1,581 cc	SOHC 8v	Monomotronic SPI	76 (56; 75) at 6,000 rpm	124 (91) at 3,000 rpm	172 (107)	13.8
1.6 16v	1996–99	I4	1,581 cc	DOHC 16v	Weber-Marelli IAW MPI	103 (76; 102) at 5,750 rpm	144 (106) at 4,000 rpm	190 (118)	11.8
1.8 i.e.	1993–96	I4, 2 BS	1,756 cc	DOHC 8v	Weber-Marelli IAW MPI	103 (76; 102) at 6,000 rpm	137 (101) at 3,000 rpm	185 (115)	10.3
1.8 16v (Note: 5-door only)	1996–97	I4, 2 BS	1,747 cc	DOHC 16v	Weber-Marelli IAW MPI	113 (83; 111) at 5,800 rpm	154 (114) at 4,400 rpm	195 (121)	9.4
1.8 16v V.V.T.	1996–99	I4, 2 BS	1,747 cc	DOHC 16v VVT	Hitachi phased sequential EFI	130 (96; 128) at 6,300 rpm	164 (121) at 4,300 rpm	200 (124)	9.6
2.0 i.e. 16v	1993–96	I4, 2 BS	1,995 cc	DOHC 16v	Weber-Marelli IAW MPI	139 (102; 137) at 6,000 rpm	180 (133) at 4,500 rpm	206 (128)	7.5
HF turbo	1993–96	I4, 2 BS	1,995 cc	DOHC 16v	Weber-Marelli IAW MPI, turbo intercooler	186 (137; 183) at 5,750 rpm	290 (214) at 3,500 rpm	220 (137)	7.5
2.0 HF (Note: HPE only)	1997–99	I4, 2 BS	1,995 cc	DOHC 16v	Weber-Marelli IAW MPI, turbo intercooler	193 (142; 190) at 5,500 rpm	290 (214) at 3,400 rpm	225 (140)	7.5
Diesel engines
1.9 turbo ds	1994–96	I4	1,929 cc	SOHC 8v	Bosch injection pump, turbo intercooler	90 (66; 89) at 4,200 rpm	186 (137) at 2,500 rpm	180 (112)	12.0
1.9 td	1996–99	I4	1,929 cc	SOHC 8v	Bosch injection pump, turbo intercooler	90 (66; 89) at 4,200 rpm	186 (137) at 2,500 rpm	180 (112)	12.0

== Third generation ==
Third generation
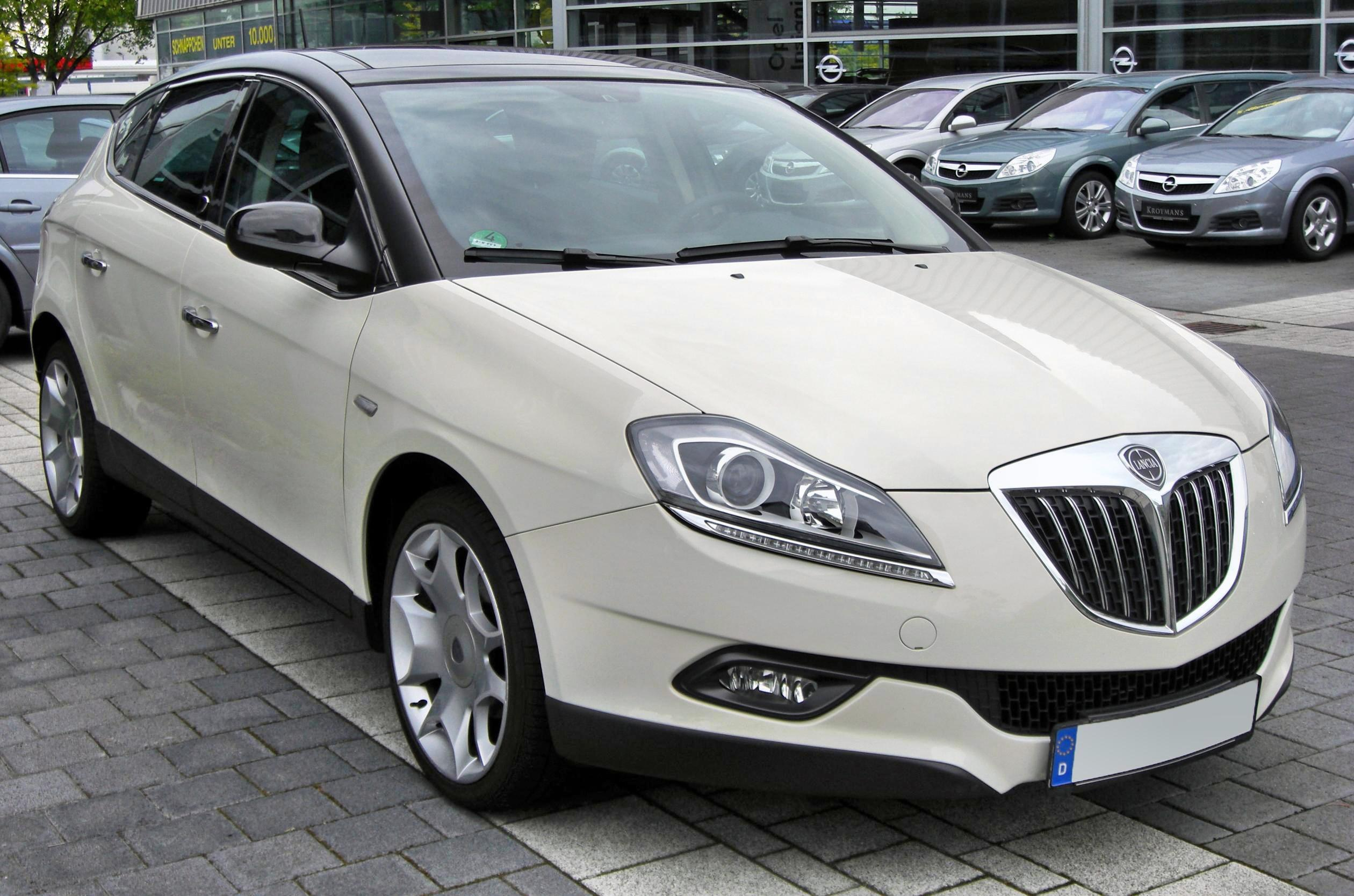

Overview
- Also called: Chrysler Delta (UK and Ireland)
- Production: 2008–2014
- Model years: 2011–2013 (UK and Ireland)
- Assembly: Italy: Frosinone, Cassino (Alfa Romeo Cassino)
- Designer: Centro Stile Lancia

Body and chassis
- Body style: 5-door hatchback
- Layout: Transverse front-engine, front-wheel-drive
- Platform: Fiat C2
- Related: Fiat Stilo; Fiat Bravo

Powertrain
- Engine: petrol: 1.4 L T-Jet turbo I4; 1.8 L FPT T-Jet turbo I4; diesel: 1.6 L Multijet II turbo I4; 1.9 L TwinTurbo Multijet twin-turbo I4; 2.0 L Multijet II turbo I4
- Transmission: 6-speed manual; 6-speed automatic; 6-speed MTA

Dimensions
- Wheelbase: 2,700 mm (106.3 in)
- Length: 4,520 mm (178.0 in)
- Width: 1,797 mm (70.7 in)
- Height: 1,499 mm (59.0 in)
- Kerb weight: 1,395 to 1,505 kg (3,075 to 3,318 lb)

In September 2006, Lancia announced the revival of the Delta name, with new cars to be built on the Fiat C platform. The world première of the new HPE concept followed, held at the 63rd Venice International Film Festival. The new Lancia Delta (Type 844) was finally unveiled at the 2008 Geneva Motor Show.

The Lancia brand was reintroduced to the Scandinavian, Russian, and Turkish markets in 2007. The new Delta was also intended for a proposed return by Lancia to the UK market during 2009. However, due to an economic downturn, plans were shelved until Fiat bought Chrysler. As the car had been engineered for RHD already, the decision was made in 2010 to bring both the new Delta and Lancia's Ypsilon into the UK and Ireland rebranded as Chryslers and to sell them through the UK Chrysler dealer network.

At the 2010 North American International Auto Show, the Chrysler branded version of the Delta was unveiled as a concept car for a potential North American release.

Delta as well as being an historical name from Lancia's past was also being interpreted this time around by Lancia as a mathematical symbol that stands for change, difference and evolution. Designed by the Lancia Style Centre, this car was aimed at the luxury end of the small family car segment. The Delta's wheelbase of 2,700 mm (106.3 in) is 100 mm (3.9 in) more than the related Fiat Bravo. It has five doors and can be considered either a hatchback or an estate (see Hatchback vs. Station wagon).

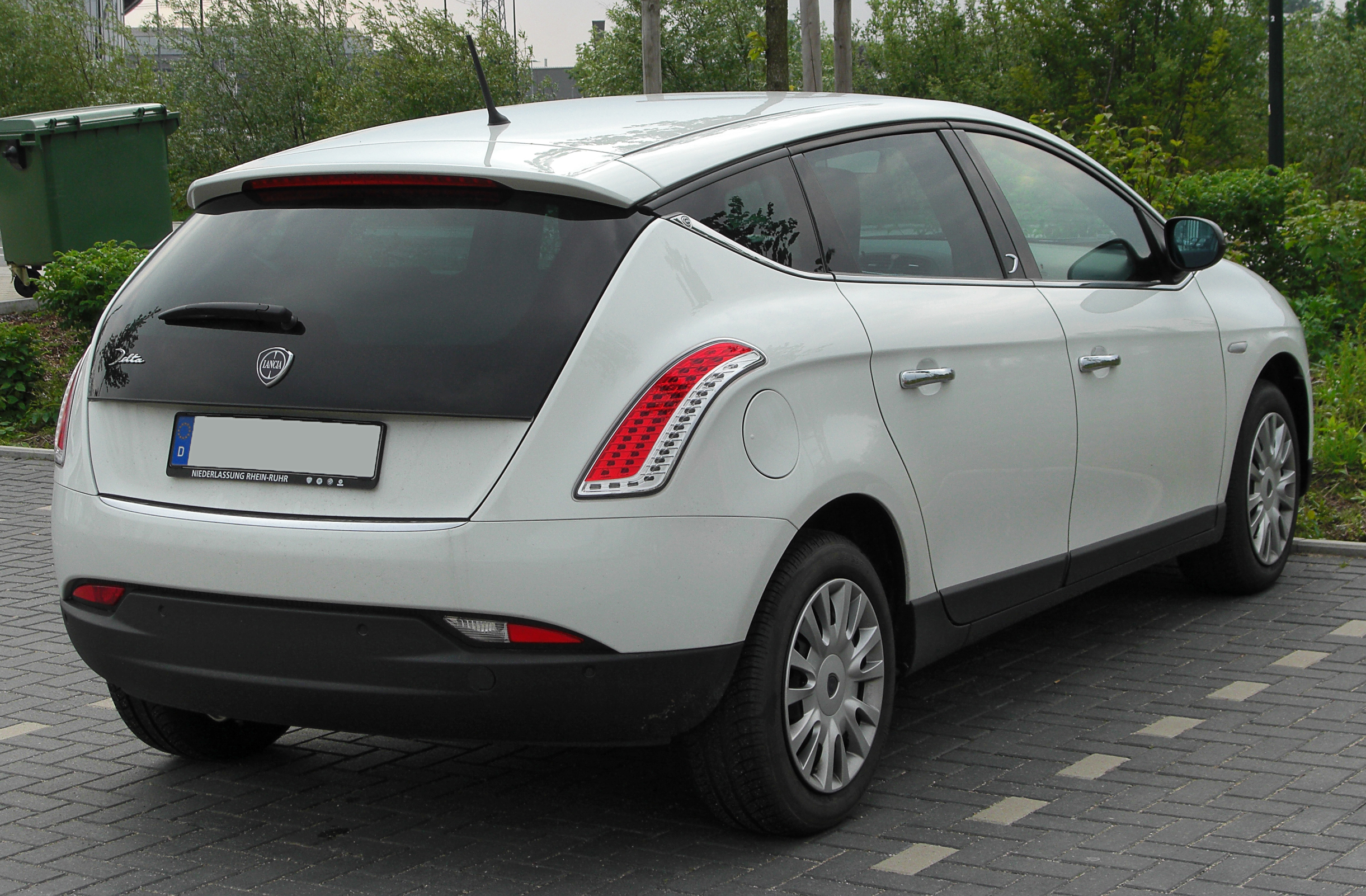
Rear styling

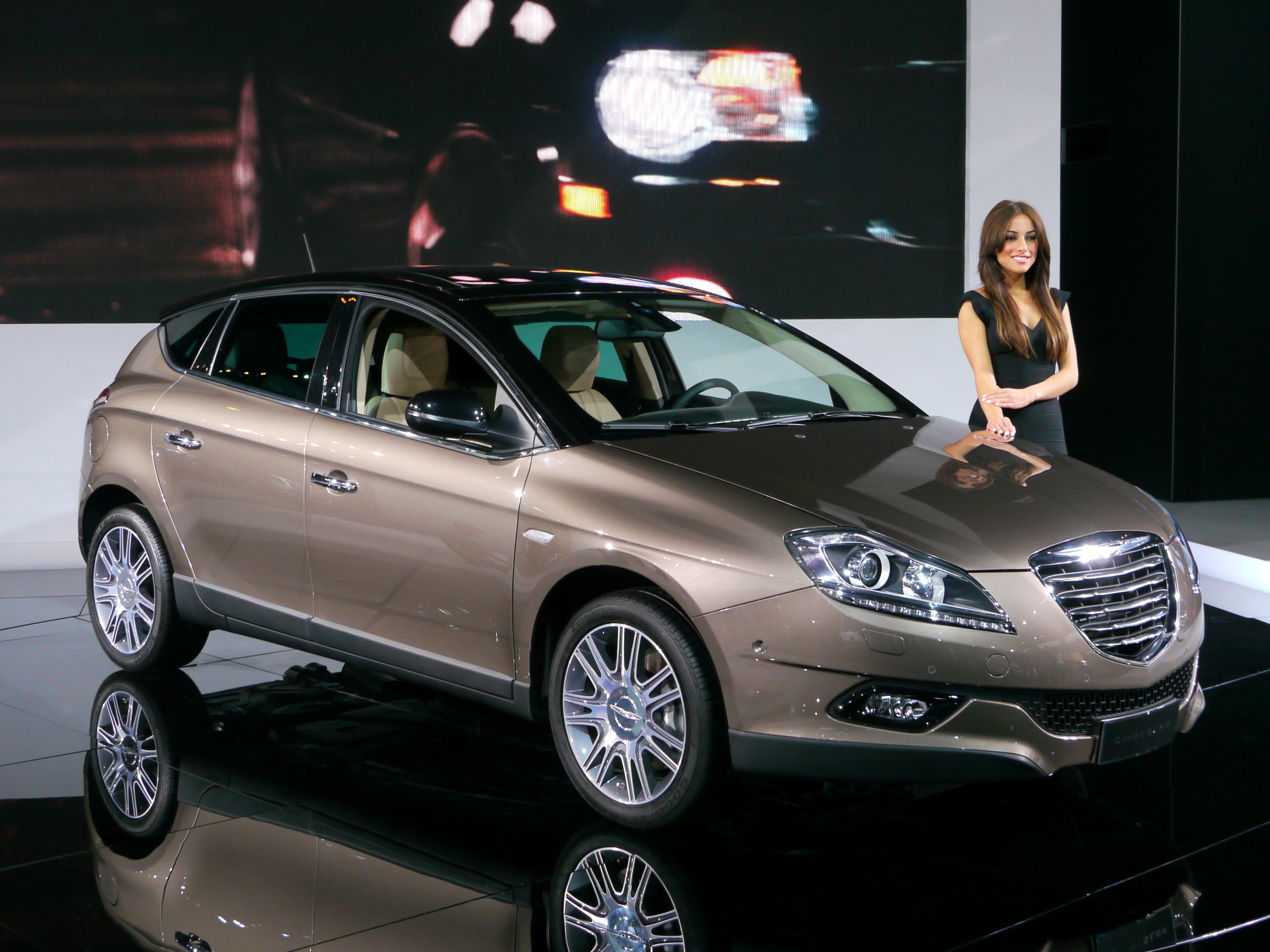
Lancia Delta badged as Chrysler (design/market study) at Chicago Auto Show 2010

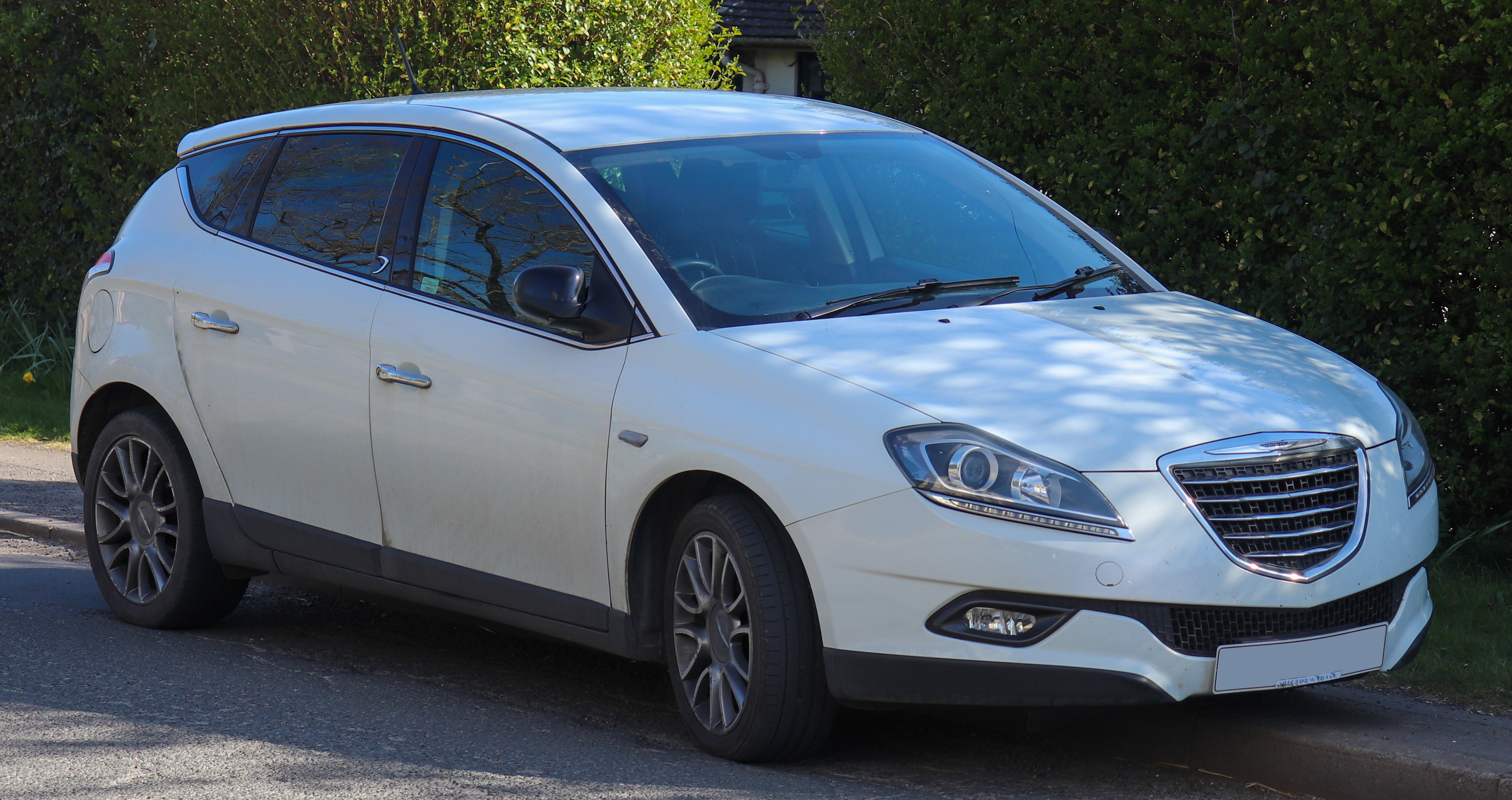
Chrysler Delta (production version)

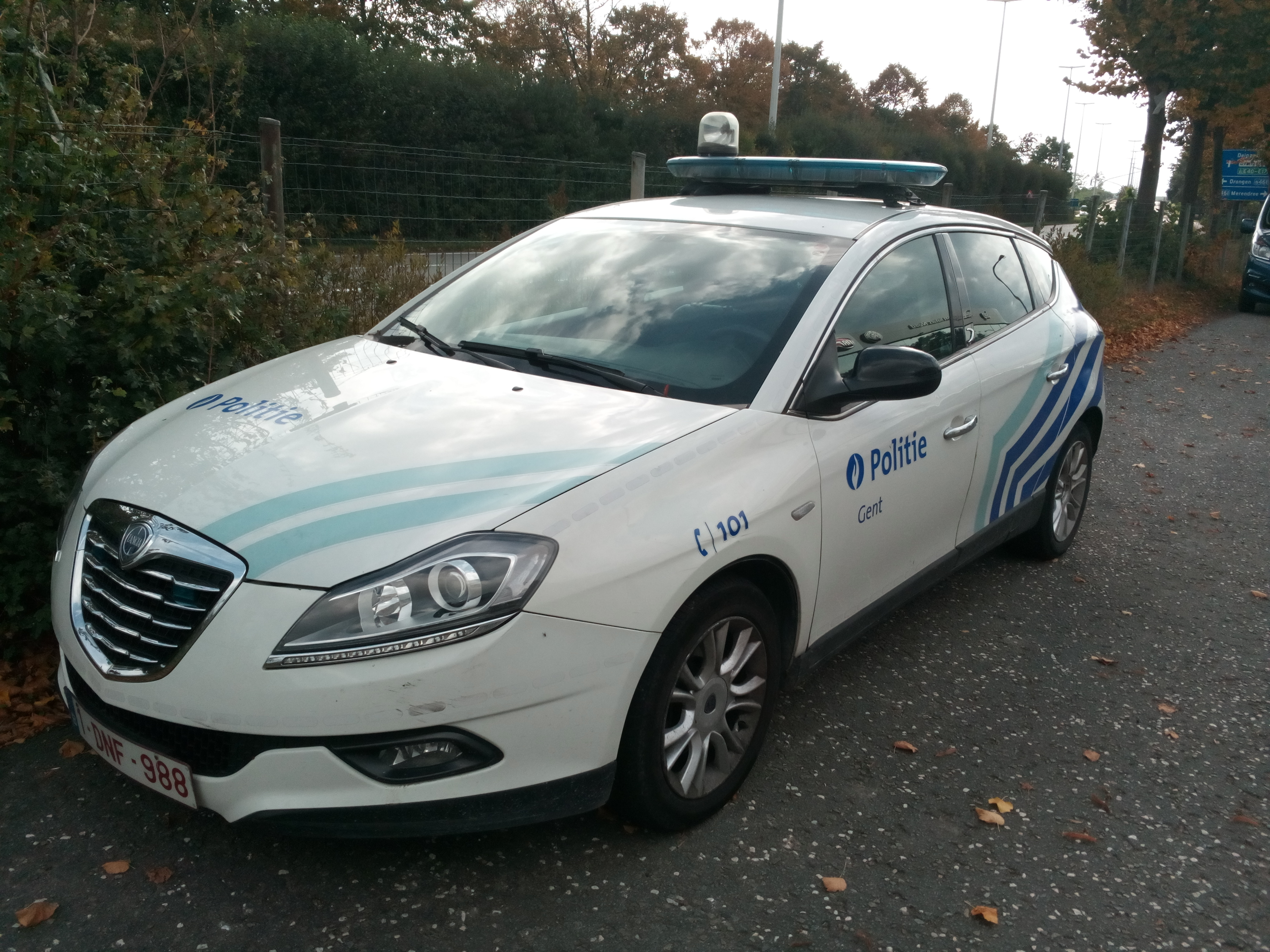
Lancia Delta used as police car (Belgium)

=== Features ===
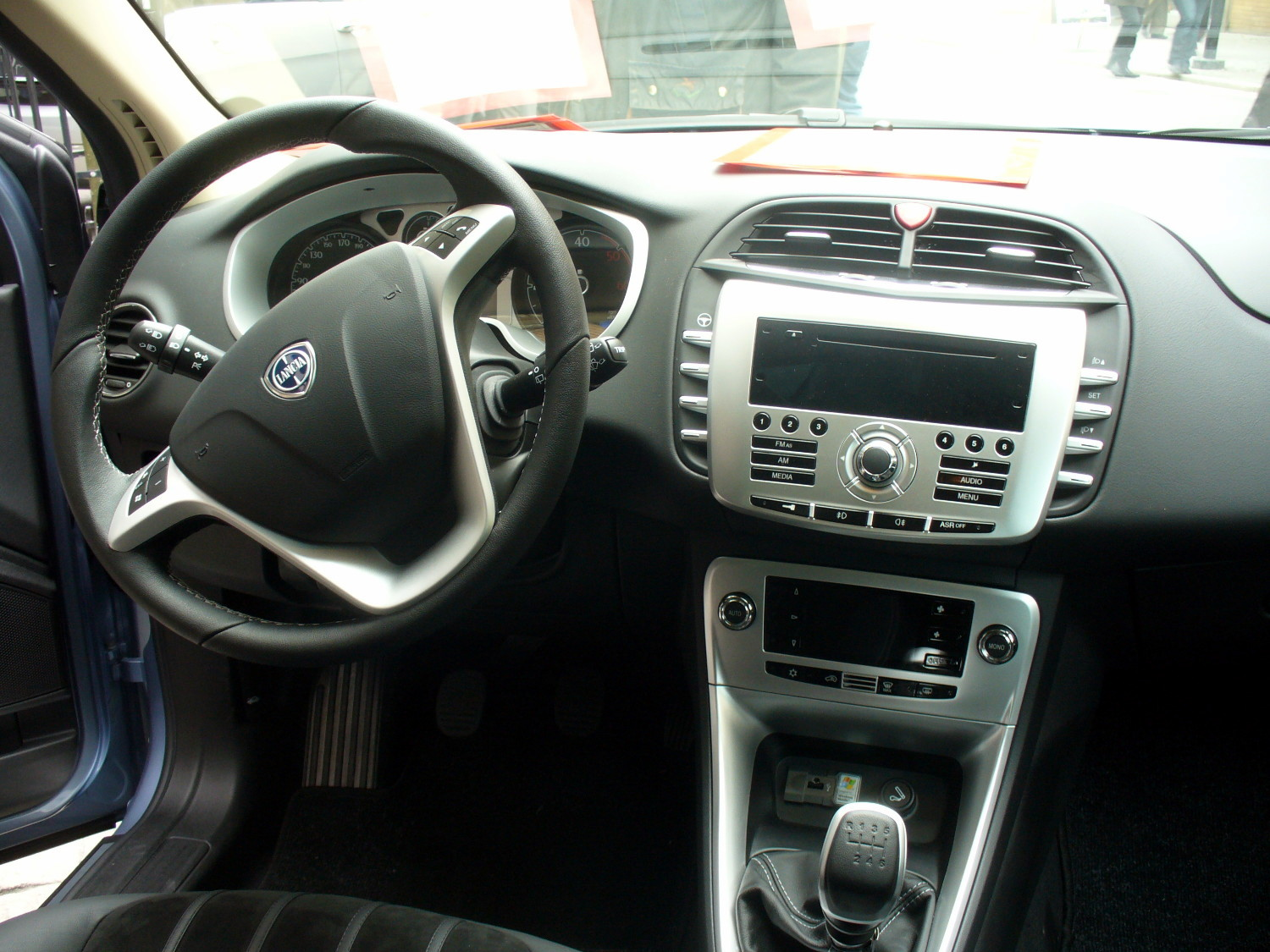
Interior styling

The new Delta offered a number of options and equipment including a Bose Hi-Fi radio incorporating a CD player and MP3 file reader with steering-wheel mounted controls, the Blue&Me system developed with Microsoft, and a new satellite navigation system developed with Magneti Marelli.

Further technical equipment included to effect the ride and handling included an advanced ESC (Electronic Stability Control) system and SDC suspension (with electronic damping control, also by Magneti Marelli). The Delta also had a driving assistant featuring electric eye monitors that give feedback to the steering wheel to suggest corrections to the driver. The car was available also with semi-automatic parking assistant.

=== 2011 facelift ===
The 2011 facelift of the Delta received trim level changes, a Chrysler-derived family grille, and a 105 PS (77 kW; 104 hp) 1.6-litre Multijet diesel engine with lower fuel consumption and CO_{2} emissions. The new version of the Delta was expected to be presented at the 2011 Geneva Motor Show.

=== Engines ===
Engines available at launch were 120 PS (88 kW) and 150 PS (110 kW) 1.4 L turbojet petrol engines and 1.6 L 120 PS (88 kW) MultiJet diesel, 2.0 multijet with 165 PS (121 kW) and 1.9 twinturbo multijet with 190 PS (140 kW). A new petrol unit was launched later: 1.8 Di turbojet with 200 PS (147 kW).

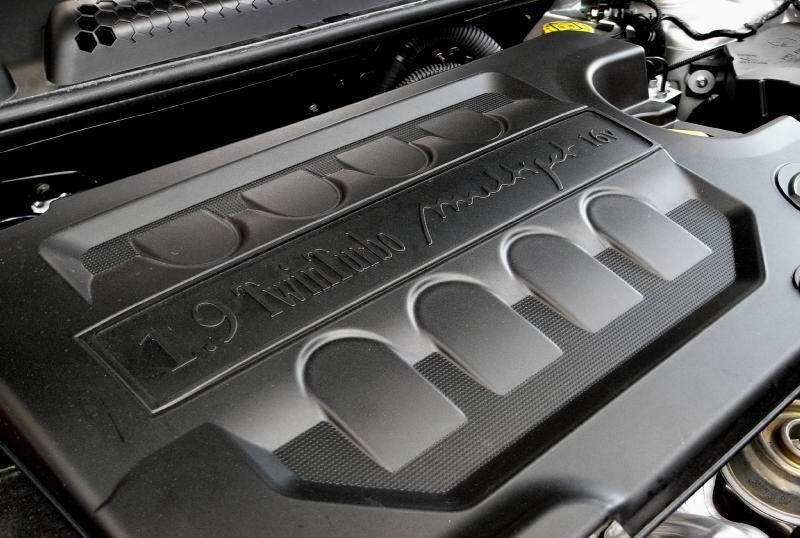
1.9 TwinTurbo Multijet engine

Model	Type	Displacement		Power				Torque			Acceleration	Max speed		Years
Model	Type	cc	cu in	PS	kW	hp	at rpm	N·m	lb·ft	at rpm	0–100 km/h (0–62 mph), s	km/h	mph	Years
1.4 T-Jet 16V	I4	1,368	83.5	120	88	120	5000	206	152	2000	9.8	195	121	2008-
1.4 T-Jet 16V	I4	1,368	83.5	150	110	148	5500	206	152	2250	8.7	210	130	2008–2010
1.4 T-jet MultiAir	I4	1,368	83.5	140	103	138	5000	230	170	1750	9.2	202	126	2010-
1.8 Di T-Jet 16V	I4	1,742	106.3	200	147	197	5000	320	236	2000	7.4	230	143	2010-
1.6 multijet 16V	I4	1,598	97.5	105	77	104	4000	300	220	1500	10.7	186	116	2011-
1.6 multijet 16V	I4	1,598	97.5	120	88	120	4000	300	221	1500	10.7	194	121	
2.0 multijet 16V	I4	1,956	119.4	165	121	163	4000	360	270	1750	8.5	214	133	
1.9 twinturbo multijet 16V	I4	1,910	117	190	140	190	4000	400	300	2000	7.9	222	138	2008-

=== Safety ===
The 2008 Lancia Delta passed the Euro NCAP car safety tests with the following ratings:

Euro NCAP test results* Lancia Delta (2008)
Test	Score	Rating
Adult occupant:	34	5 /5 stars
Child occupant:	33	3 /5 stars
Pedestrian:	15	2 /4 stars

== Fourth generation ==
Fourth generation

Overview
- Production: 2028
- Assembly: Italy: Frosinone, Cassino
- Designer: Centro Stile Lancia

Body and chassis
- Body style: 5-door hatchback

The production of the new Lancia Delta, fourth generation, is expected in late 2028. The main engine options available will be hybrid and fully electric. The production is scheduled at the factory in Cassino, Frosinone.

== See also ==
- Lancia ECV
