= List of years in motoring =

This is a list of years in motoring.

== List ==
- 1978 in motoring
- 1979 in motoring
- 1980 in motoring
- 1981 in motoring
- 1982 in motoring
- 1983 in motoring
- 1984 in motoring
- 1985 in motoring
- 1986 in motoring
- 1987 in motoring
- 1988 in motoring
- 1989 in motoring
- 1990 in motoring
- 1991 in motoring
- 1992 in motoring
- 1993 in motoring
- 1994 in motoring
- 1995 in motoring
- 1996 in motoring
- 1997 in motoring
- 1998 in motoring
- 1999 in motoring
- 2000 in motoring
- 2001 in motoring
- 2002 in motoring
- 2003 in motoring
- 2004 in motoring
