= Karosseriebau Autenrieth =

Coachbuilding company in Germany

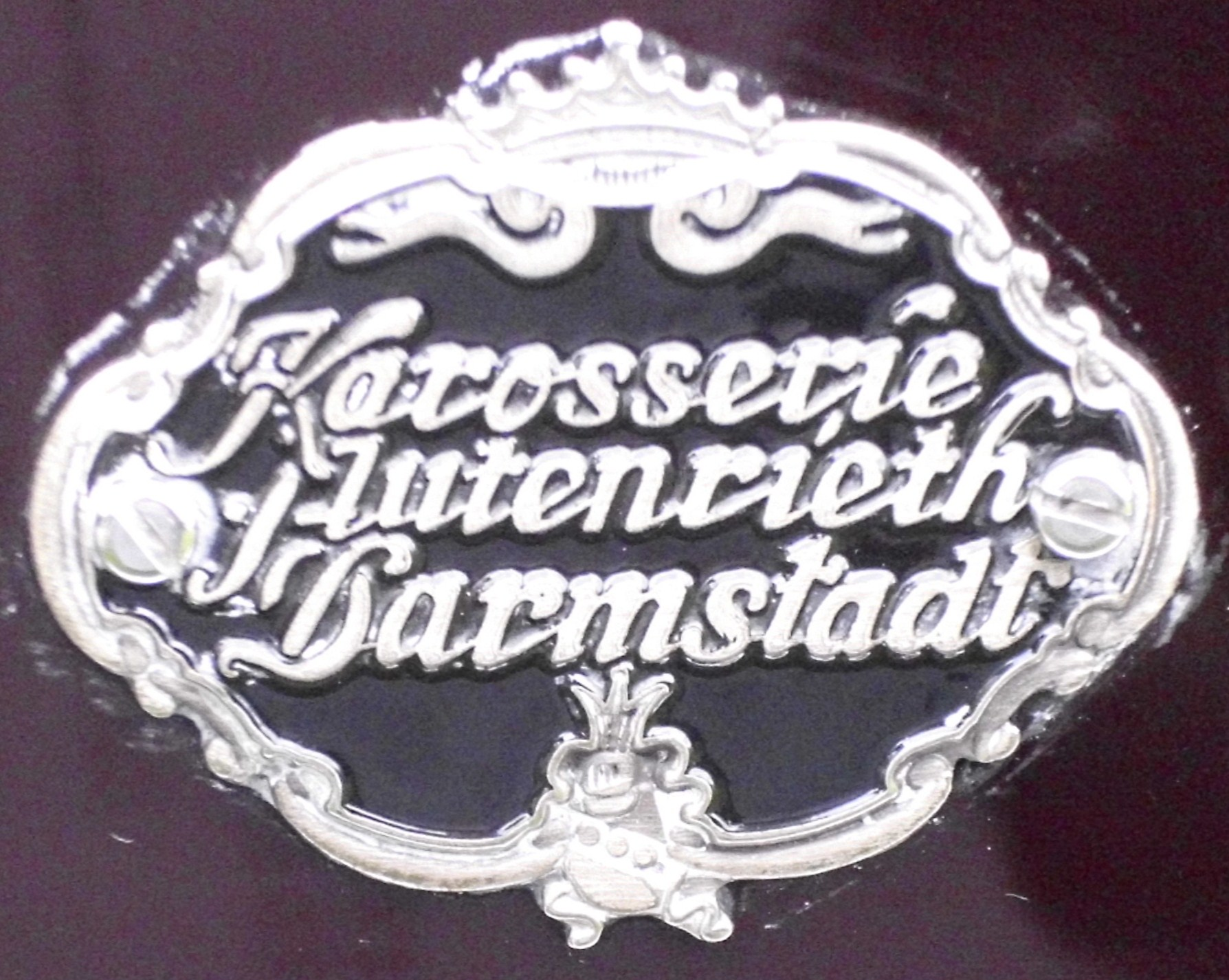
- Company type: Coachbuilding company
- Industry: Auto industry
- Founded: 1921
- Founder: Georg Autenrieth
- Defunct: 1964
- Headquarters: Darmstadt, Germany

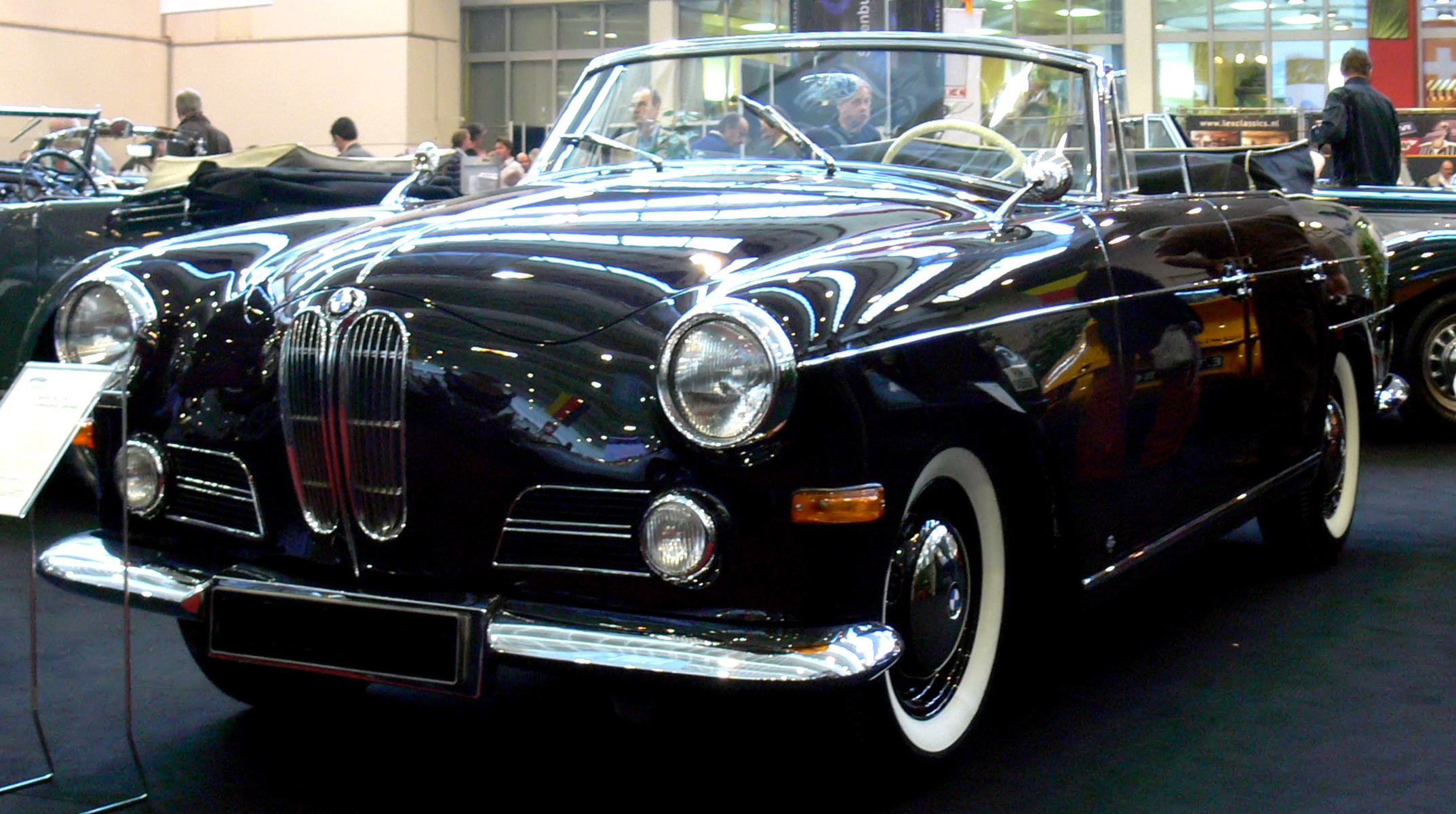
1960 BMW 502 V8 Autenrieth Convertible

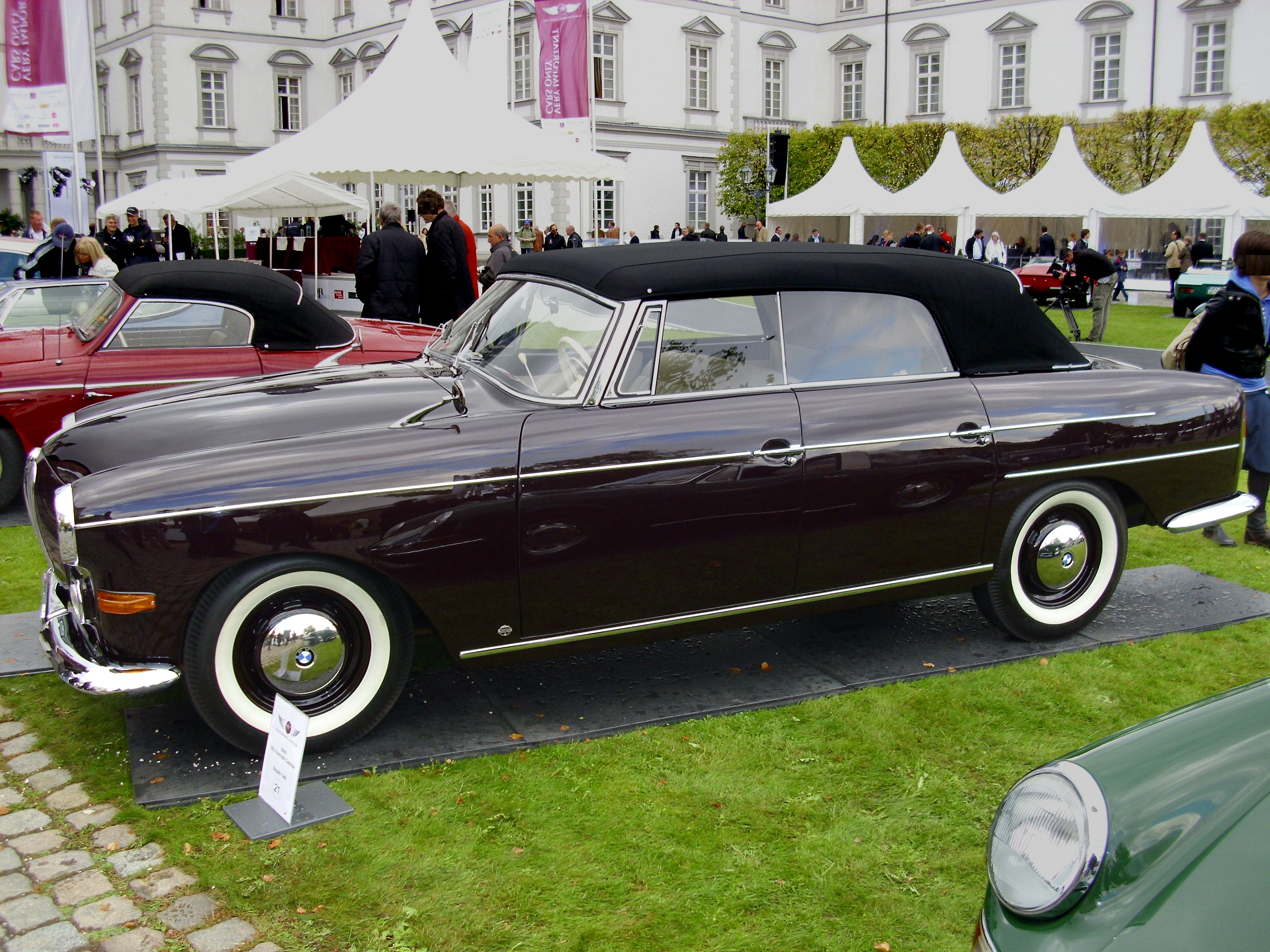
1960 BMW 502 V8 Autenrieth Convertible

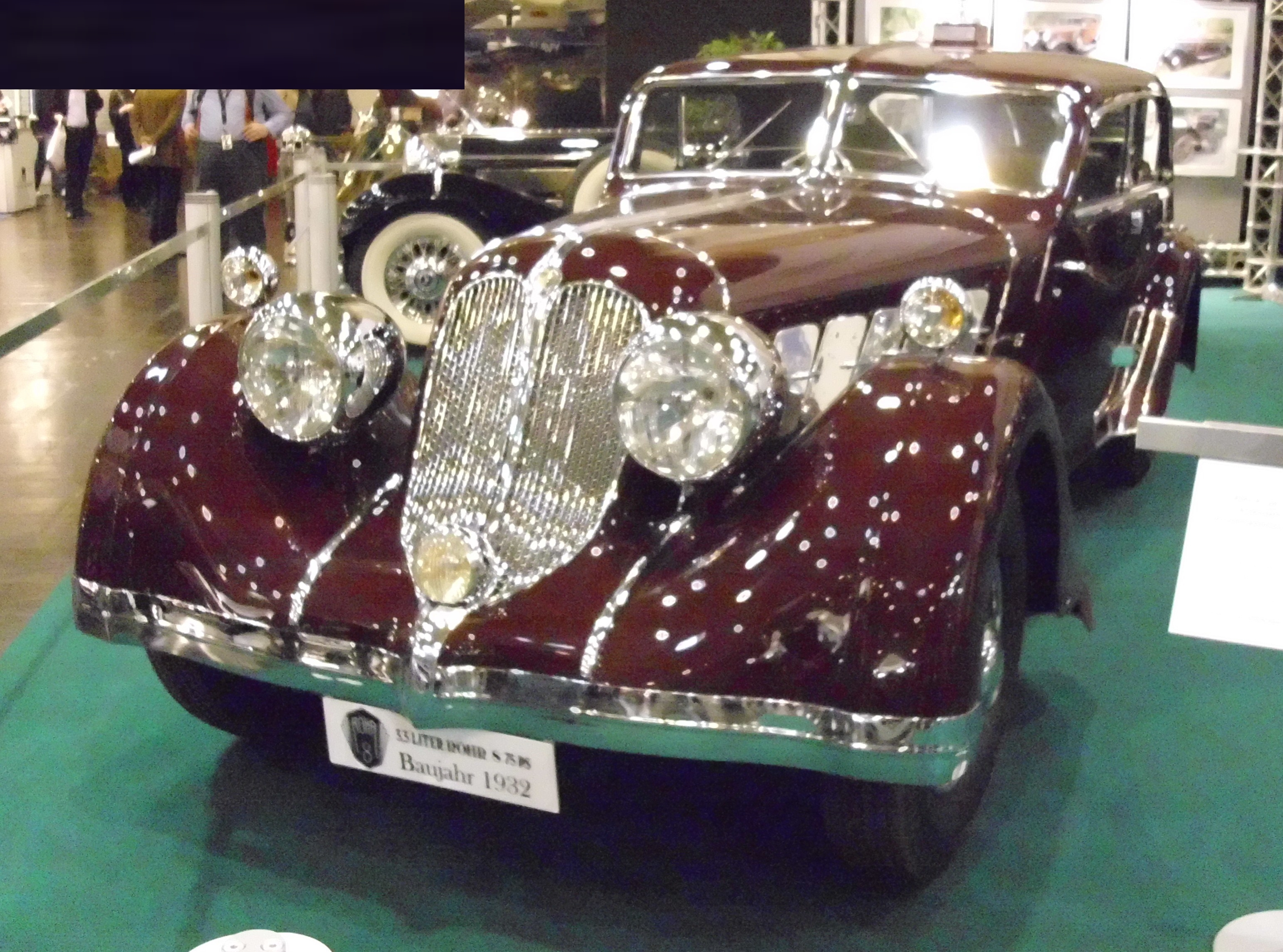
1932 Röhr 8 Type F, an Autenrieth streamlined sedan

Karosseriebau Autenrieth was a coachbuilding company in Darmstadt, Germany between the years 1921 to 1964.

In the first decades of automobile manufacturing until World War II, it was the German custom of their buying a chassis complete with an engine and take it to a coachbuilder to add a custom-built body to it. One of coachbuilders was Georg Autenrieth, who founded his company in 1921 in Weinsberg near Heilbronn and moved it in 1925 to 72 Feldbergstraße, Darmstadt.

Customized orders were made for individual sedans, coupées, convertibles and custom-made products on chassis of various well-known pre-war automotive manufacturers such as Adler, Audi, Horch, Maybach, Mercedes-Benz, Opel, NSU, and Röhr-Werke in Ober-Ramstadt near Darmstadt. In the 1930s, BMWs also got a customized body by Autenrieth. In the late 1930s and early 1940s, a smaller lot of convertibles were produced, based on the chassis of the first KdF car, the later Volkswagen Beetle.

During the war, manufacturing of car bodies was discontinued and the company became an armory supplier. In the reconstruction phase after World War II, the cooperation with BMW was resumed. The cars of the time, which were built on a chassis, continued to be used for other superstructures, supporting the body itself. In 1950, founder Georg Autenrieth died. Also in the 1950s, coupés and convertibles were built on the basis of the large BMW models. Convertibles, known as "Cabriolet" were also produced on early Citroën DS models as well as Borgward Isabella. More well-known are from the last years of the company Autenrieth convertibles and coupés based on different Opel models like Opel Olympia, Opel Rekord and Opel Kapitän. In addition, station wagons and hearses. In 1964 Autenrieth's production ended.
