= 2004 in motoring =

This article 2004 in motoring deals with developments in the automotive industry that occurred throughout the year 2004 by various automobile manufacturers, grouped by country.

== United States ==
On 29 April 2004, the last Oldsmobile was produced. Due to declining demand for Oldsmobile cars, General Motors announced in December 2000 that the brand would be discontinued.

== United Kingdom ==
Ford launched its new Focus, including 1.4 and 1.6 four-cylinder petrol units, a 1.6, 1.8 and 2.0 Turbo Diesel. Whilst in the US, the first generation model carried on.

Vauxhall reintroduced the Tigra nameplate with an all-new model based on the Corsa.

== Germany ==
BMW has launched the 1 Series range, a five-door and three-door hatchback which replaced the BMW 3 Series (E46) Compact.

Mercedes-Benz CLS-Class was introduced. An all-new model in the form of a four-door coupé (fastback) that is based on the W211 E-Class.

== France ==
Citroen released the new C4 available in a hatchback coupé or five-door at the 2004 Geneva Motor Show.

Peugeot launched the 407, a large family car available as a saloon, coupé and estate to replace the 406.

The Mégane Renault Sport was introduced to the fresh hot hatch market and includes a 2.0L turbo engine rated at 225 PS (165 kW; 222 bhp) at 5500 rpm and 300 N·m (220 lb·ft) at 3000 rpm.

Renault also introduced the Modus at the 2004 Geneva Motor Show, a mini MPV based on the Clio which is positioned as the smallest in Renault's MPV segment.

== Australia ==
The Holden VZ Commodore is introduced as a facelift of the VY Commodore with minor exterior changes and a new Alloytec V6 engine.

== See also ==
- 2003 in motoring - the previous year
- 2004 in motoring - the next year
