= 1998 in motoring =

1998 in motoring includes developments in the automotive industry that occurred throughout the year 1998 by various automobile manufacturers, grouped by country. The automotive industry designs, develops, manufactures, markets, and sells motor vehicles.

== United Kingdom ==
The fourth generation Vauxhall Astra went on sale in May, with a new design as well as a range of updated and new engines. Lotus Cars was employed to tune the new Astra's chassis. The entry-level engine was a 1.6 8-valve unit carried over from the previous Astra. There were also 16-valve units with 1.4, 1.6, 1.8 and 2.0 litres, as well as 1.7 and 2.0 diesels. Three- and five-door hatchbacks were available, along with the five-door hatchback and four-door saloon. There were coupe and cabriolet versions planned for later launch. A new generation of the Frontera launched in the Autumn with new styling and similar dimensions to its predecessor.

Ford produced the winner of next year's European Car of the Year award with its Focus in October, a newly designed range of family hatchbacks, saloons and estates to succeed the Escort. But the Escort remained on sale for another two years. Power came from 16-valve 1.4, 1.6, 1.8 and 2.0 Zetec petrol engines as well as a 1.8 turbo-diesel. Ford ends production of the Scorpio after 4 years without a successor as buyers struggled to warm to its controversial styling.

Jaguar launched a smaller, lower priced model - the S-Type. Designed as a competitor for the likes of the BMW 5 Series, the S-Type was a traditionally styled four-door saloon with a design similar to the 1960s saloons. It was powered by 3.0 V6, 3.2 V8 and 4.0 V8 engines. Sales would begin in Spring 1999.

Rover ceased production of the 600 and 800 Series production for the launch of a new car, the Rover 75 four-door saloon with sales beginning in June 1999. The 100 Series supermini was withdrawn from sale after 18 years starting with the Austin Metro in 1980. A poor Euro-NCAP crash-test result meant demand quickly fell and the last models were made in December 1997.

== Germany ==
Audi reentered the coupe market with its TT 2+2 coupe and two-seater roadster. It had a similar look to the show car which debuted in 1994 as a concept vehicle. Quattro four-wheel drive came as standard on all models. The turbocharged 1.8 20-valve entry-level engine produced 180 bhp to propel the car to well over 130 mph, while the twin-turbo 225 bhp version could reach 150 mph. The car shared its running gear with the Skoda Octavia, VW Golf as well as Audi's own A3. Sales began in early 1999.

Volkswagen launched a new version of its Volkswagen Beetle. The original 1938 version continued in Mexico, prior to the launch of the new Golf-based version. It was powered by 2.0 petrol and 1.9 turbo-diesel engines. UK sales were planned for 1999, though right-hand drive versions were not due until 2000. The engine range was expected to be widened in the future, as well as a cabriolet version being added.

Volkswagen launched a saloon version of its fourth generation Golf. The Volkswagen Bora, known as the Jetta in the US. Visually similar to the slightly larger Passat. UK sales began in March 1999, with 1.6, 1.8 and 2.0 four-cylinder and 2.3 V5 petrol engines available as well as a 1.9 turbo-diesel.

Mercedes-Benz launched a new S Class in the Summer with a sleek new design and a host of new technology which would soon filter down the rest of the Mercedes range.

== France ==
Peugeot ceased 205 production after several years of gradually phasing out its supermini which was launched in 1983. Its successor, the 206, was one of the largest cars in its sector, with 1.1, 1.4 and 1.6 petrol engines and a 1.9 diesel engine. The new car would also be produced in Ryton in the UK.

Renault launched a second-generation of its Clio, in 1.2, 1.4 and 1.6 petrol units as well as a 1.9 diesel, with two higher performance versions planned. The LHD-only Twingo received a major facelift with a new luxury Initiale model. The RenaultSport Clio 172 hatchback had a 2.0 engine with 172 bhp and a top speed of around 140 mph. The mid-engined renaultsport Clio V6 was powered by a 3.0 V6 engine and had a top speed of 155 mph. Both cars were not expected before 2000. The Laguna received a facelift in the Spring while early in the year the Grand Espace launched, a larger version of the MPV providing more interior space than the standard model.

Citroen launches an estate version of the Xsara bringing ZX production to an end after 7 years.

== Italy ==
The Alfa Romeo 166 was launched as a replacement for the 164.

The European Car of the Year award for 1998 went to the Alfa Romeo 156 that launched in late 1997. It was a sporty-looking four-door saloon aimed directly at the BMW 3 Series and Audi A4 which offered a distinctive design feature with hidden rear door handles, giving it the appearance of a coupe. The four-door saloon was the only model in the 156 range at launch until the SportWagon estate appeared in 2000.

The new Multipla compact MPV arrived and features a six-seat layout and launched in the Autumn while UK sales began in late 1999. It quickly became famous for its unusual styling inside and out while offering a spacious and practical interior.

Preceded by 1997 in motoring - the previous year	Motoring per year	Succeeded by 1999 in motoring - the next year
