= 1978 in motoring =

1978 in motoring deals with developments in the automotive industry that occurred in 1978, listed by country. The automotive industry designs, develops, manufactures, markets, and sells motor vehicles.

== United Kingdom ==
Vauxhall introduced a new top-of-the-range saloon and estate that was directed at buyers of the Ford Granada and Rover SD1. The Carlton was a rear-wheel drive executive car that replaces the VX1800/VX2000 and offered a more modern and attractive package with more refinements. It was built in Germany alongside the identical Opel Rekord.

Chrysler's financially troubled European division bolstered its chances of survival with the launch of a five-door front-wheel drive hatchback, the Horizon which was the first car of its kind to be built in Britain, similar in concept to the Volkswagen Golf launched in West Germany four years earlier. It gave buyers a modern alternative to the ageing rear-wheel drive Avenger saloons and estates which continued in production despite falling directly into the category of cars that the Horizon might be expected to replace. This meant that the carmaker was in the unusual position of offering rear-wheel drive saloons and estates as well as a front-wheel drive hatchback at the same time.

== France ==
While the British Ryton plant welcomed the Talbot Horizon, Chrysler's French plant at Poissy produced the Simca Horizon. Aside the badge, the French version was identical to the British version. For French buyers, it replaced the ageing Simca 1100, although that smaller and more obsolete car continued in production.

The Chrysler/Simca Horizon was European Car of the Year for 1979.

Renault expandeded its range with the launch of the R18 saloon and estates. It replaced the smaller R12 saloon as well as some versions of the ageing R16 hatchback which was partially replaced by the R20/R30 in 1975. The R18 shared much of its mechanical design with the smaller R14 hatchback. The R16 would be axed the following year while the R12 would continue until 1980. It offered front-wheel drive in a market where rear-wheel drive cars like the Ford Cortina/Taunus and Vauxhall Cavalier/Opel Ascona still led the way in terms of sales.

Peugeot launched the first of its "05" generation of cars. The 305 was a stylish range of medium-sized saloons and estates which replaced the 304, although that car remained in production for another two years.

1978 was the 2CV's 30th year of production but the makers launched a more modern and practical small car to give buyers more choice. The Visa was visually in keeping with Citroen's individuality, but underneath it was mostly made up of Peugeot components. Most importantly, it gave buyers the advantage of four doors and a hatchback within a compact package, something that most other carmakers did not have as most cars in this sector at the time were available only as three-door hatchbacks.

== Germany ==
Six years after its launch, the Audi 80 underwent its first facelift. The front end saw the most changes, but otherwise it was recognisable as the solid four-door saloon which had bolstered Audi's fortunes in past years.

Volkswagen finished European production of the Beetle although production continued in Mexico and Brazil. European buyers were still able to buy Beetles, but new models such as the Polo and Golf became the brand's market leaders.

Opel launched a new version of its Rekord range-topper which was built in West Germany and built alongside Britain-bound models that were sold as the Vauxhall Carlton.

== Italy ==
The most controversially styled car of 1978 was possibly the Fiat Ritmo hatchback (Strada in the UK). It ran along the 128 saloon, using much of that model's front-wheel drive running gear. The car would soon be famous for a series of adverts featuring robots on its production line with the slogan "Handbuilt By Robots".

== Poland ==
Nine years after launching the Fiat 125-based 125p (sold in Britain since 1975 as the Polski Fiat), FSO expanded its range with the launch of the Polonez which made use of the same engines and running gear as the original Polski Fiat.

== Japan ==
Nissan built on the success of its Datsun badged vehicles in Europe with the launch of updated versions of the entry-level Cherry and larger Sunny.

== Soviet union ==
Lada launched the Niva four-wheel drive model becoming a two-model manufacturer a decade after the launch of its Fiat based saloon and estates. The Niva, however, is Lada's own design and was developed partly for military use but became popular with buyers looking for a cheap model with four-wheel-drive ability.

== See also ==
- 1977 in motoring
- 1979 in motoring
