= Opel Rekord =

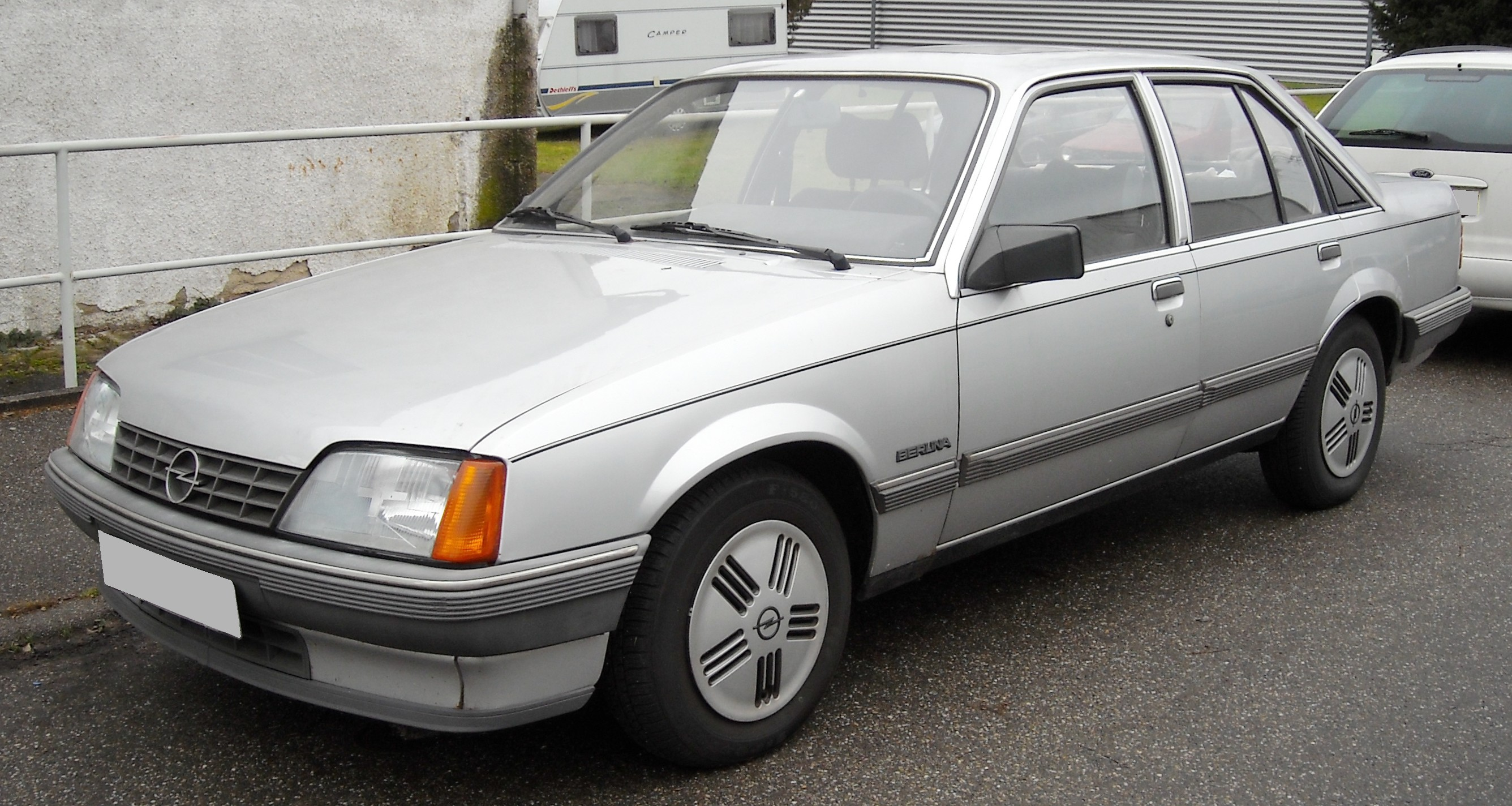
- Opel Rekord E2

Overview
- Manufacturer: Opel
- Production: 1953–1986

Body and chassis
- Class: Family car (D)
- Body style: 2/4-door saloon 3/5-door station wagon 3-door van 2-door convertible 2-door coupé

Chronology
- Predecessor: Opel Olympia
- Successor: Opel Omega

The Opel Rekord is a large family car which was built in eight generations by the German car manufacturer Opel. Between 1953 and 1986, approximately ten million were sold.

The Series D and E Rekords also spawned derivative versions manufactured by Opel's British sister company Vauxhall and in the case of the Rekord E, GM's Australian arm Holden. In 1986, the Rekord nameplate was replaced by the Opel Omega.

== Naming ==
The Rekord name evolved into the main name of the model; at first the name was used in close relationship with the Opel Olympia name, which pre-dated the Rekord but was also reinstated in a separate model in 1967.

The various generations are described here with the manufacturer's, or other commonly used designations such as "Rekord P I" or "Rekord B". The car was not badged with these additional appellations.

== Olympia Rekord (1953–1957) ==
The Opel Olympia Rekord was introduced in March 1953 as successor to the Opel Olympia, a pre-World War II design dating back to 1935. The Opel Olympia Rekord was built until 1957 in four different versions. Around 580,000 units were produced. Styling of the 1953–54 sedans resembled scaled-down versions of the contemporary Chevrolet in the U.S. Both cars were of course, products of General Motors.

- 1953/54: 1488 cc, 40 PS (29 kW; 39 hp). Available as two-door saloon, cabriolet and estate (Caravan). Price in Germany: DM 6,410 to 6,710. 136,028 units made.
- 1955: 1488 cc, 40 PS (29 kW; 39 hp). Mild facelift, comprising larger rear window, new grille insert. New base model called simply Olympia; a delivery, based on the saloon, was also introduced. Price in Germany: DM 5,850 to 6,710. 131,586 units made.
- 1956: 1488 cc, 45 PS (33 kW; 44 hp). New grille insert, bumpers now without guards. Price in Germany: DM 5,410 to 6,560. 144,587 units made.
- 1957: 1488 cc, 45 PS (33 kW; 44 hp). New grille insert again, flatter roof, chrome strips along belt line. The cabriolet was no longer part of the line. Prices in Germany: DM 5,510 to 6,560. 169,721 units made.

General data:

- Wheelbase 97.9 in (2,487 mm)
- Length 166.9 in (4,239 mm)
- Width 64 in (1,626 mm)
- Height 61 in (1,549 mm)
- Kerb weight 2,020 lb (920 kg)-2,200 lb (1,000 kg)
- Top speed approximately 75 mph (121 km/h)
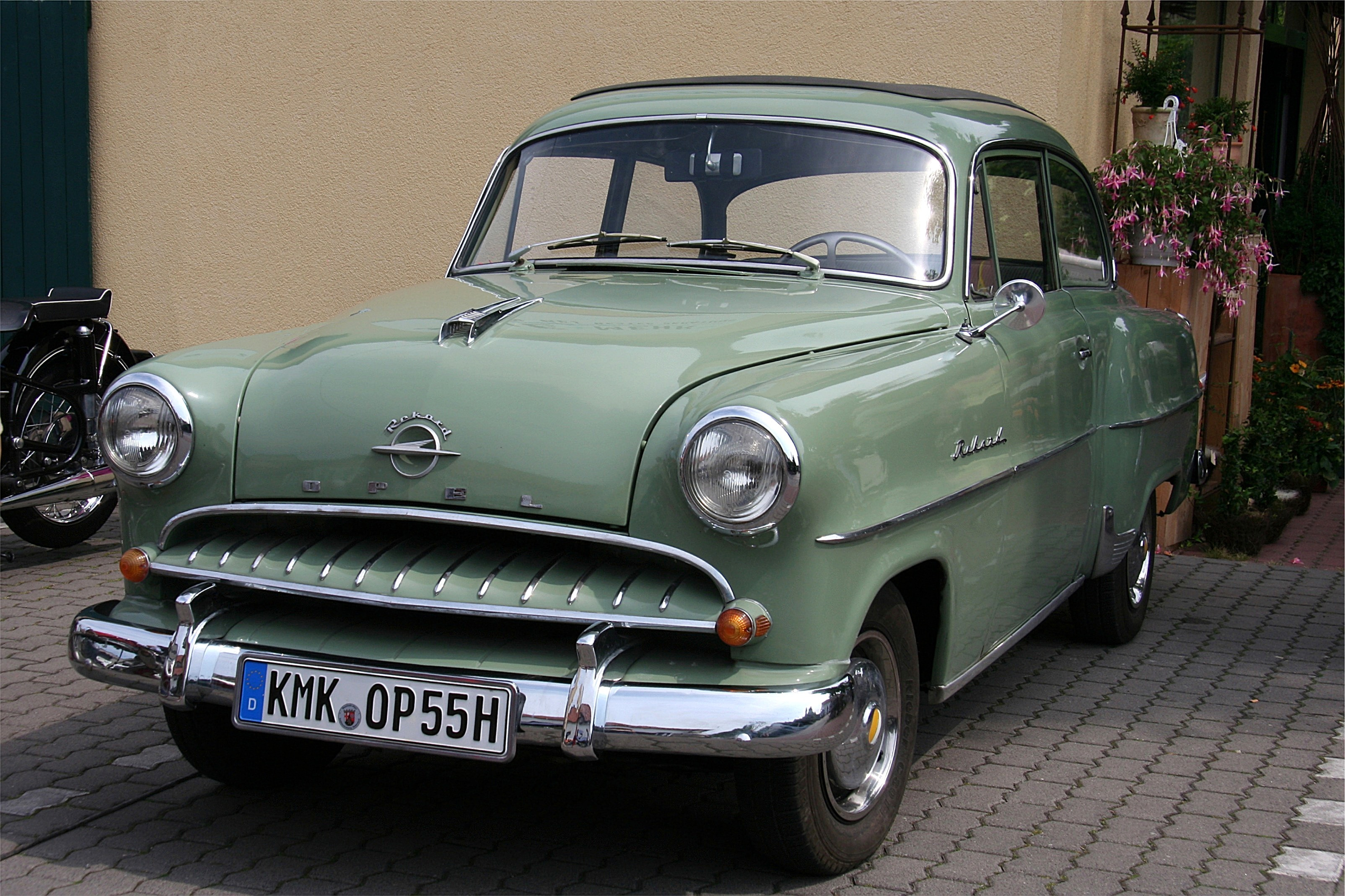
Opel Olympia Rekord (1954–1955)

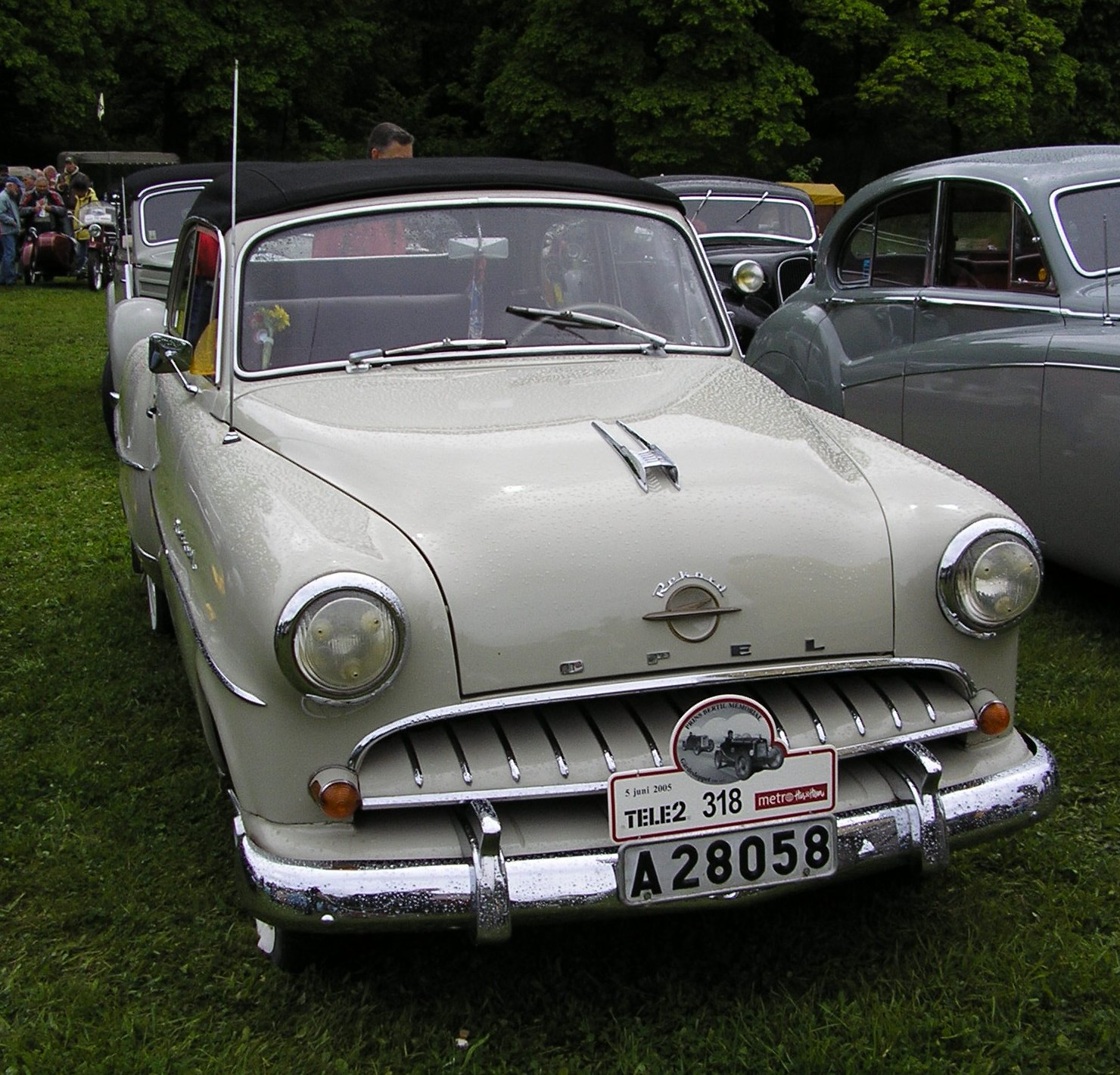
Opel Olympia Rekord convertible (1954–1955)

== Rekord P1 (July 1957 – July 1960) ==
The Opel (Olympia) Rekord P1 had a slightly larger, more modern body with wraparound windscreen and rear screen, introducing to Germany the latest American fashion of two-tone paintwork.

The standard model was sold as the Opel Olympia Rekord, while a reduced specification version was marketed simply as the Opel Olympia and widely known, less formally, as the "Bauern-Buick" (Peasant's Buick).

A new base version with an 1196 cc engine appeared in 1959 badged more simply as the Opel 1200, and replacing the Opel Olympia.

A semi-automatic gearbox ("Olymat") became available for model year 1959. Initially the car retained the 1488 cc, 45 PS (33 kW; 44 hp) of its predecessor: this was complemented by a 1680 cc, 55 PS;L engine for model year 1960.

The PI remained in production until 1960.

- 1958–59: 1488 cc, 45 PS (33 kW; 44 hp). Available as two-door "Olympia" base model or more luxurious two-door "Olympia Rekord" and as three-door estate ("Caravan") and "delivery" van based on the saloon. Price in Germany: DM 5,785 to 6,845. 509,110 units were made.
- 1959: 1488 cc, 45 PS (33 kW; 44 hp); on request 1680 cc, 55 PS (40 kW; 54 hp). Also available as four-door saloon. Several refinements including padded dashboard, ignition lock, electrically driven windscreen wipers. The new base model "Opel 1200" replaced the former Olympia (1196 cc, 40 PS (29 kW; 39 hp), DM 5,835); the 1200 remained in production until December 1962, while the P I was superseded in August 1960 by the Rekord P II.

Price in Germany: DM 6,545 to 7,110. 307,000 units (P I) + 67.952 units (1200). In 1959–60, Karosseriebau Autenrieth of Darmstadt, Germany converted P I two-door sedans to coupés and cabriolets, in very limited numbers. Prices were DM 9,380 for the coupé and DM 11,180 for the convertible.

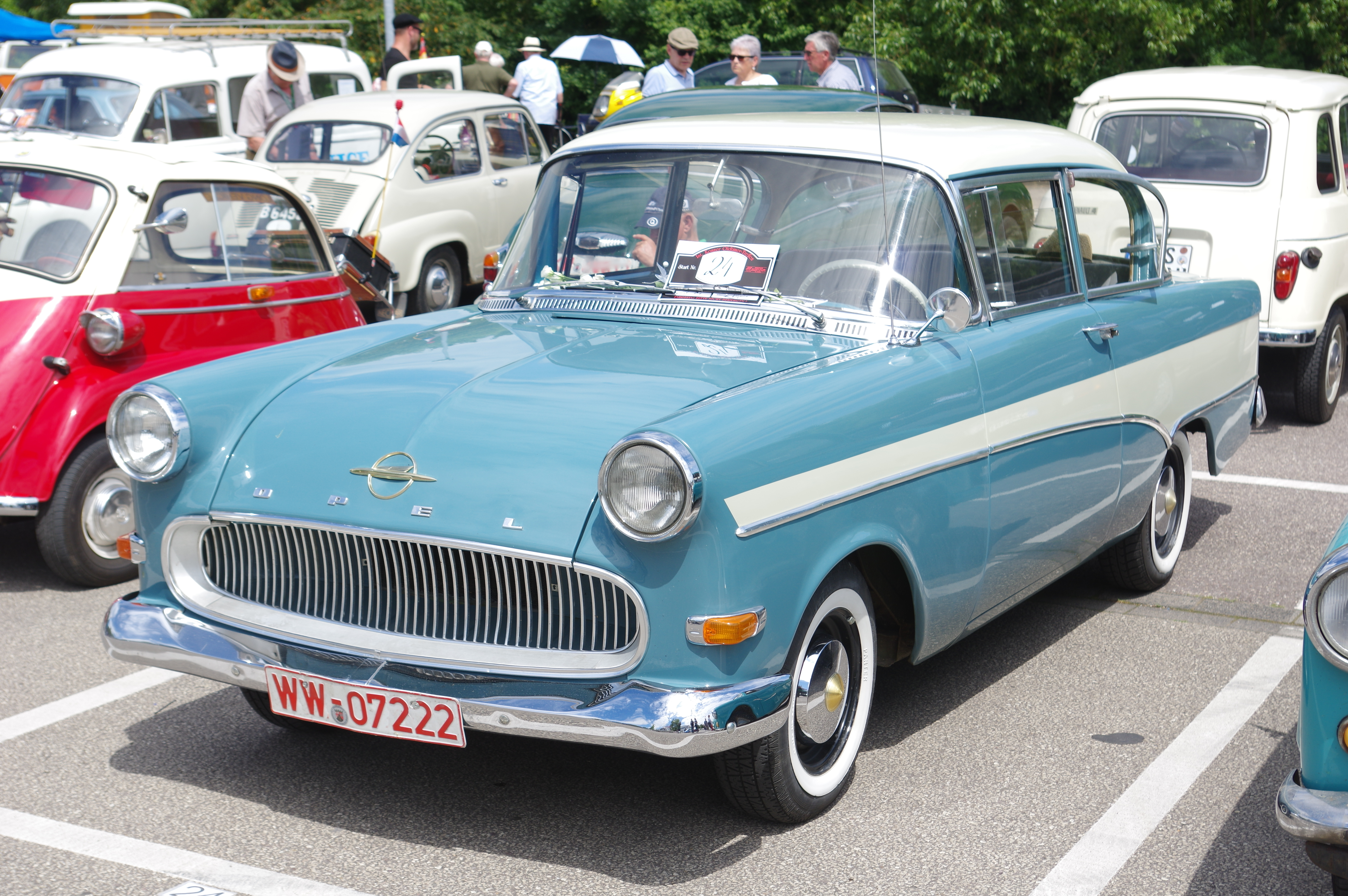
1958 Opel Rekord

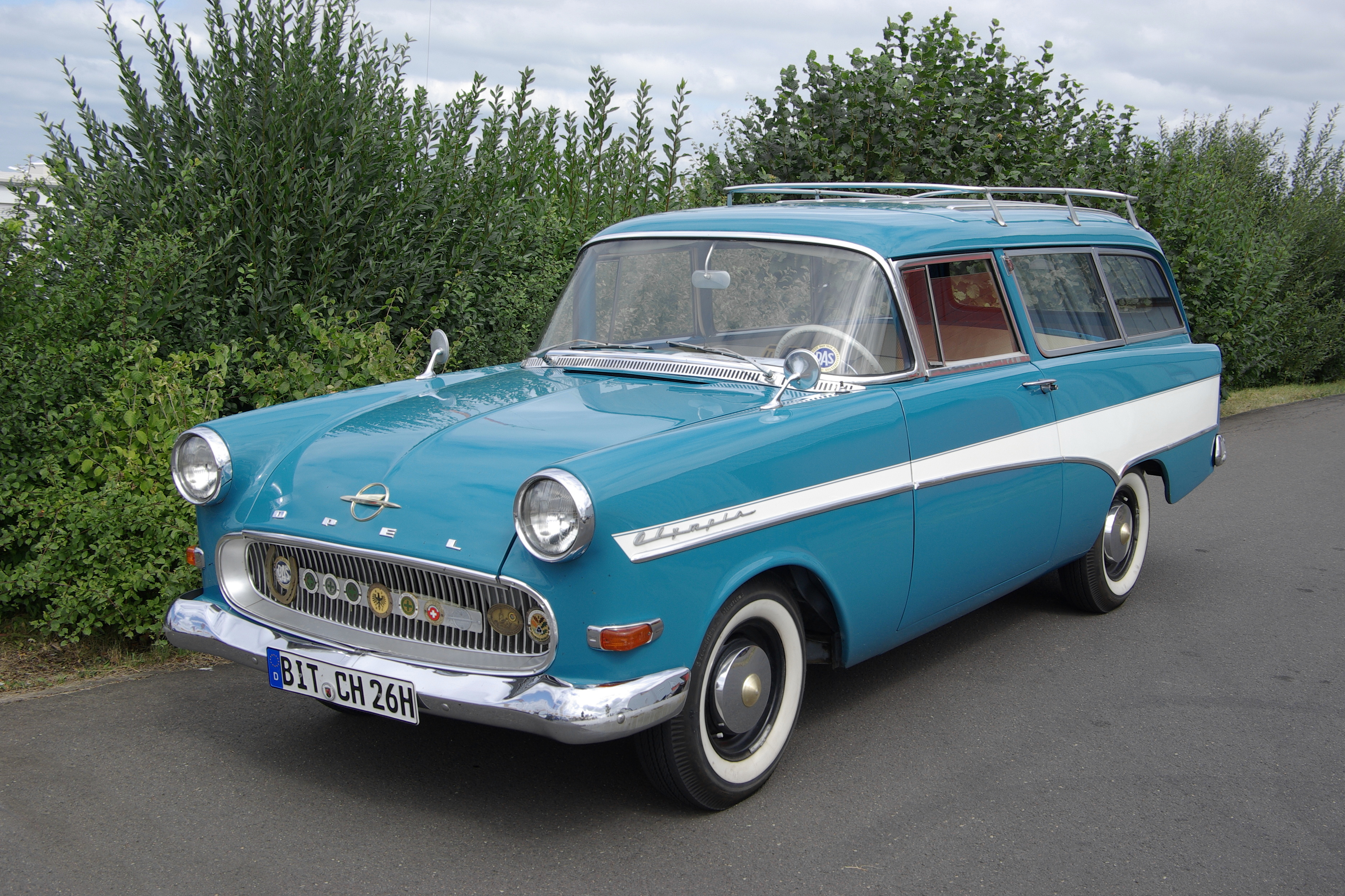
Opel Olympia Caravan

General data:

- Wheelbase 100 in (2,540 mm)
- Length 174.9 in (4,442 mm)
- Width 63.6 in (1,615 mm)
- Height 58.7 in (1,491 mm)
- Kerb weight 2,010 lb (910 kg)-2,210 lb (1,000 kg)
- Top speed 74 mph (119 km/h)–82 mph (132 km/h).

== Rekord P2 (1960–1963) ==
The Opel Rekord P2 grew in size, if not in wheelbase, and received a totally new body that did away with wraparound windows. It was available in several body versions: 2-door and 4-door saloon, a 3-door estate ("Caravan") plus delivery van, a pick-up, and a convertible. From August 1961 on, a works coupé became available, and in June 1962 a more luxurious "L" version was added with a new top engine of 1700 cc "S" and a higher compression ratio. The latest versions had an optional four-speed gearbox.

Prices in Germany: DM 6,545 to 7,770. 787,684 units made. Autenrieth continued to sell a handful of convertibles at DM 11,635.

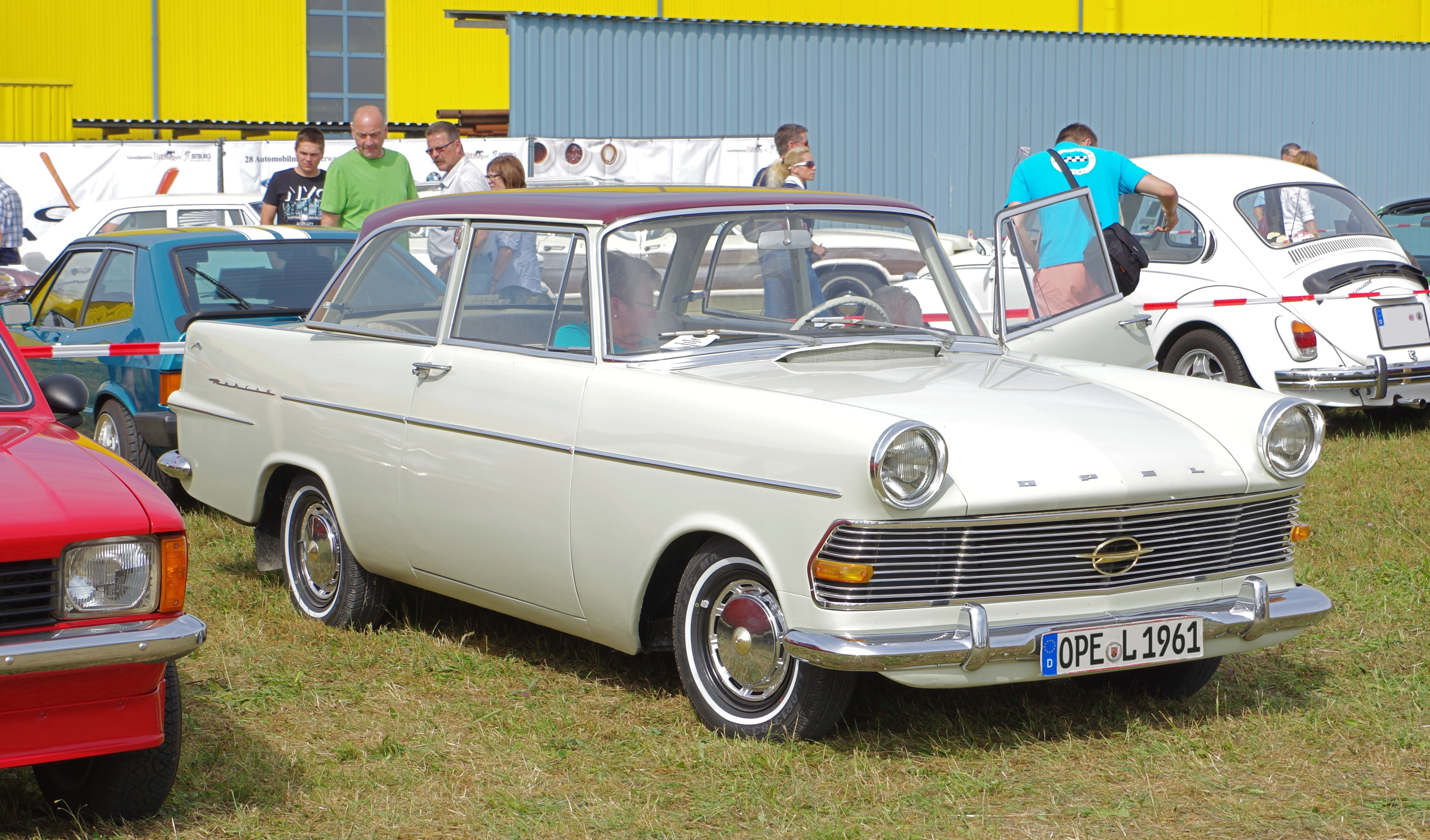
Opel Rekord P2 two-door saloon

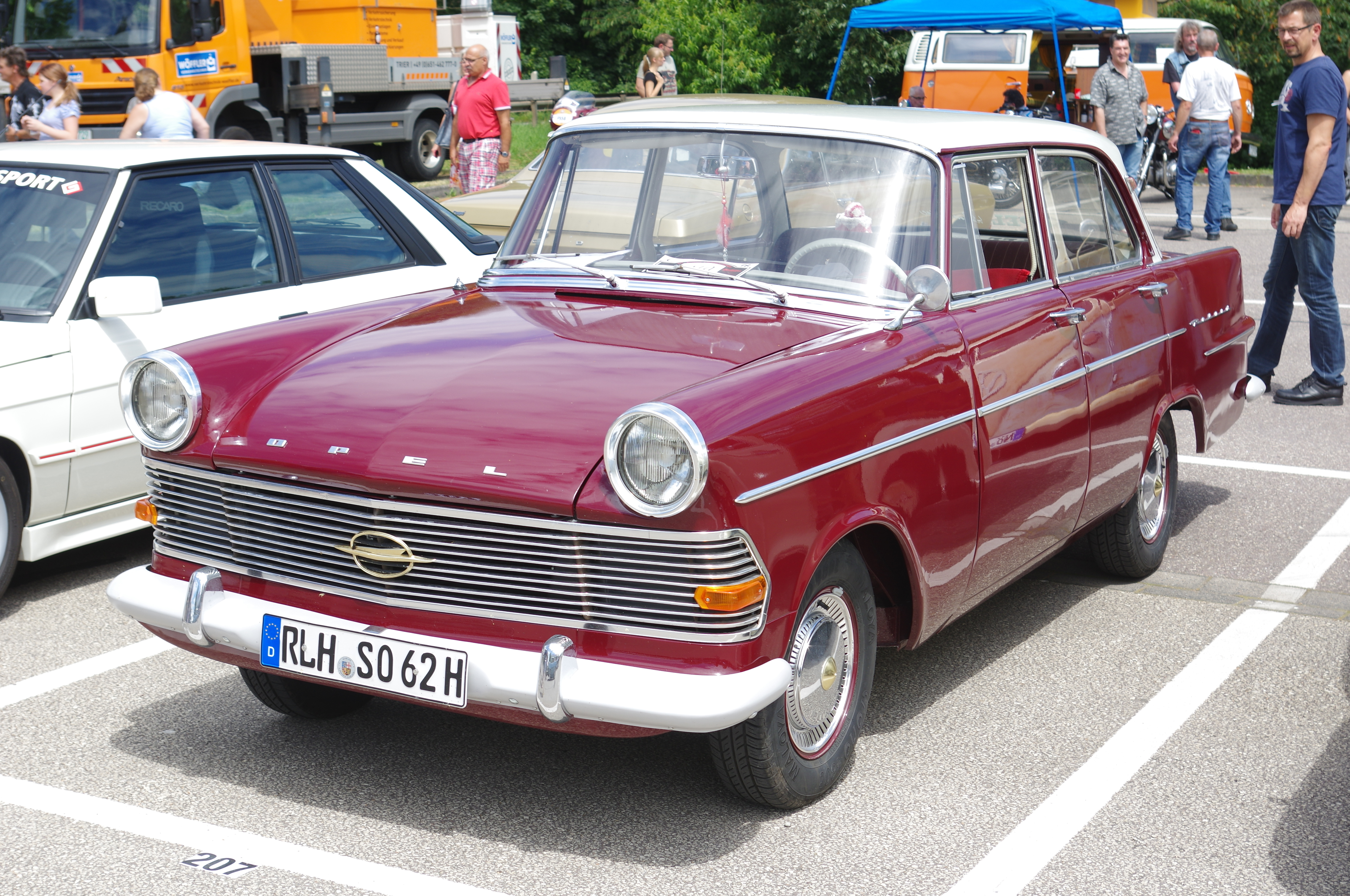
Opel Rekord P2 four-door saloon

General data:

- Engines: 1488 cc, 50 PS (37 kW; 49 hp), or 1680 cc, 55 PS (40 kW; 54 hp) or 1680 cc, 60 PS (44 kW; 59 hp)
- Wheelbase 100 in (2,540 mm)
- Length 177.8 in (4,516 mm)
- Width 64.3 in (1,633 mm)
- Height 58.6 in (1,488 mm)
- Kerb weight 2,075 lb (941 kg)-2,240 lb (1,020 kg)
- Top speed 77 mph (124 km/h)-87 mph (140 km/h)

== Rekord A (1963–1965) ==
The Rekord A line-up was a repeat of the Rekord P II (two- and four-door saloon, two-door estate and delivery van, two-door coupé with 1500 or 1700 or 1700 S engines), but the bodies were completely new and the wheelbase stretched to 103.3 inches (2,620 mm). March 1964 saw the introduction of the Rekord L-6 with the Opel Kapitän's 2.6-litre inline-six.

Prices in Germany: DM 6,830 to 9,370; front disc brakes: + DM 200, four-speed with floor shift: + DM 180. In total, 885,292 units were built. In very limited numbers, Karl Deutsch of Cologne sold a convertible version with either the 1700 S or the 2600 engine, at DM 11,765 and 13,060 respectively.

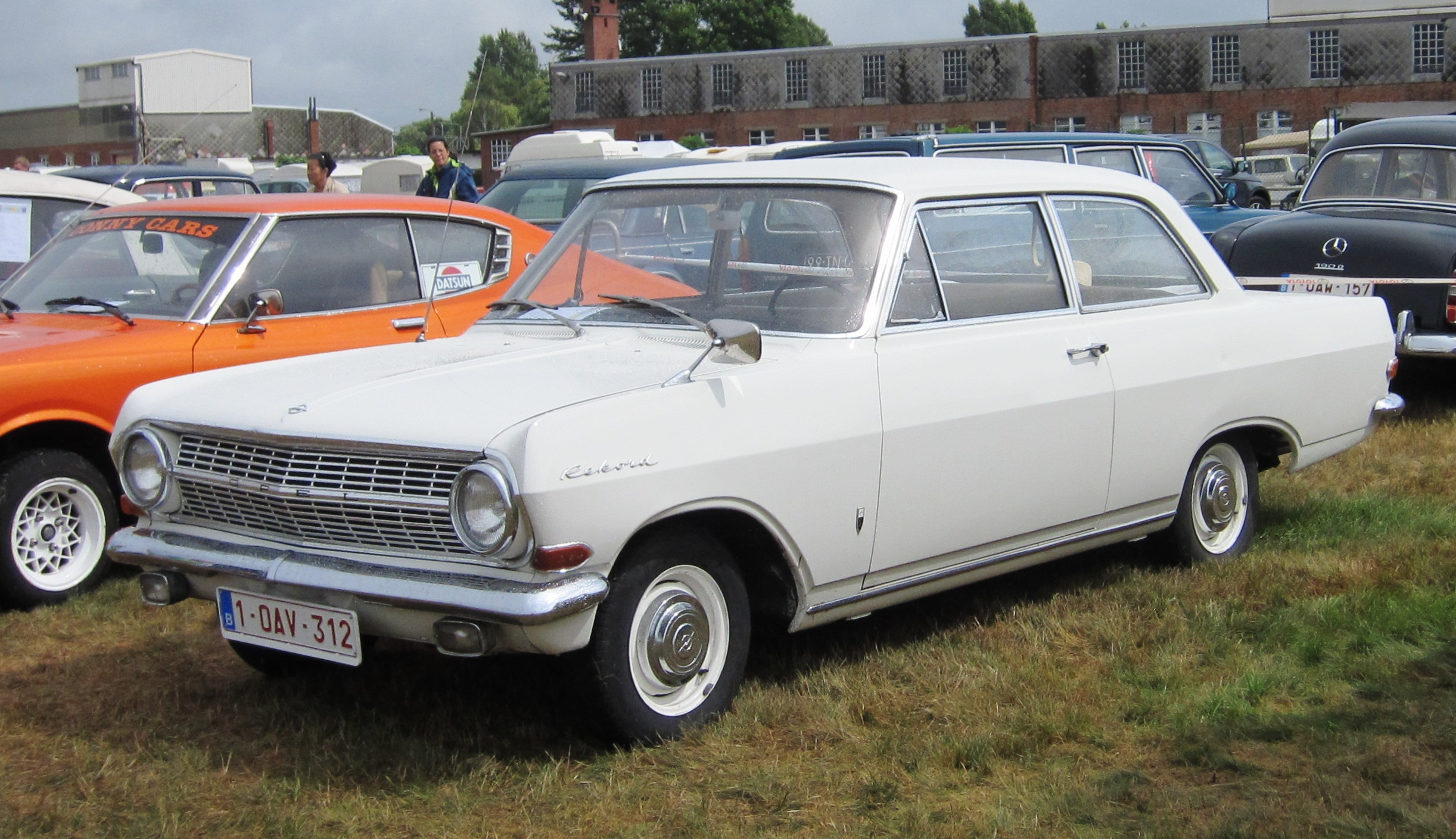
Opel Rekord A two-door saloon

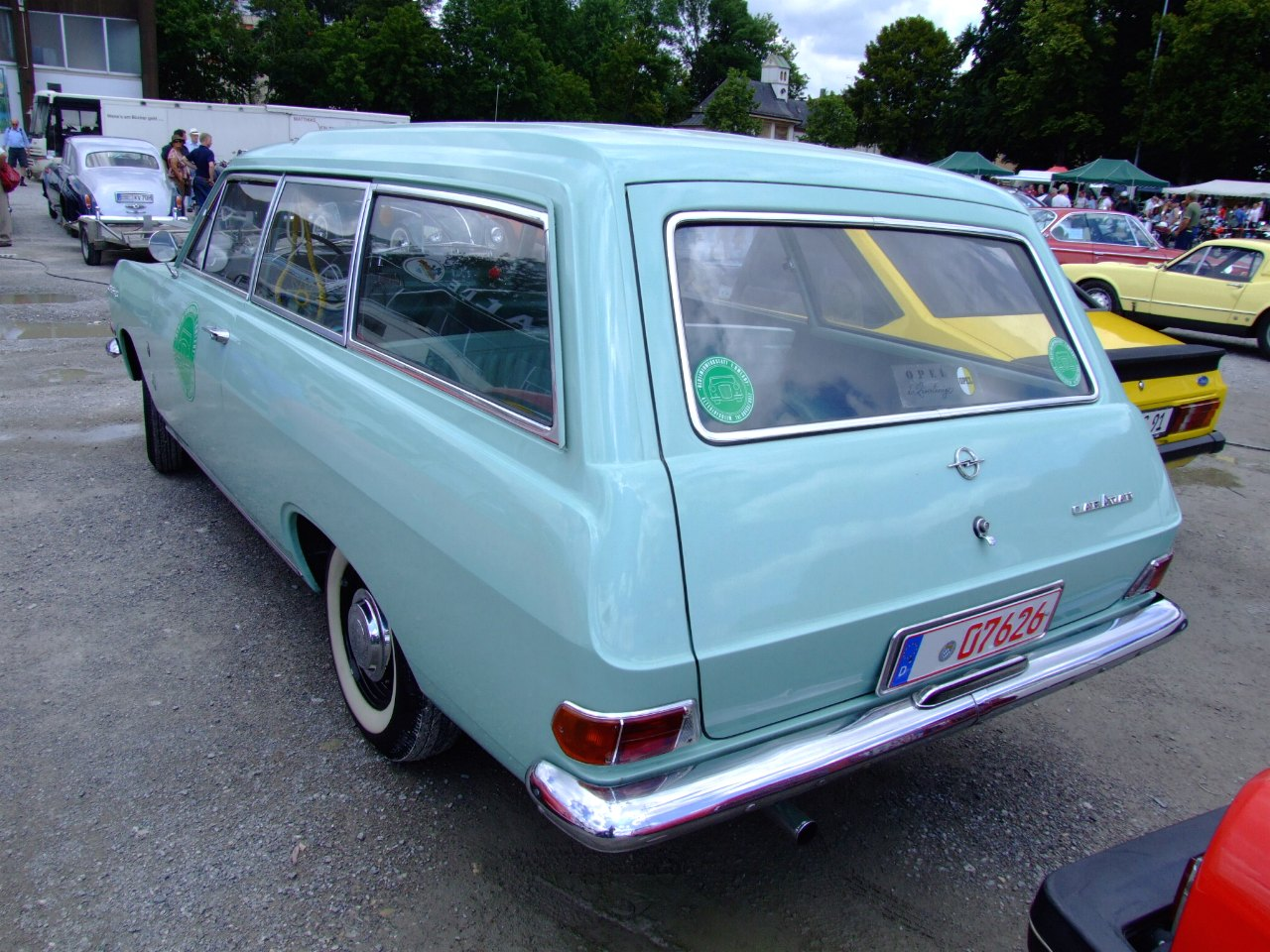
Opel Rekord A Caravan

General data:

- Engines: 1488 cc, 55 PS (40 kW; 54 hp), or 1680 cc, 60 or 67 PS (49 kW; 66 hp), or 2605 cc, 100 PS (74 kW; 99 hp)
- Wheelbase 103.9 in (2,639 mm)
- Length 178 in (4,521 mm)
- Width 66.8 in (1,697 mm)
- Height 57.7 in (1,466 mm)
- Kerb weight 2,140 lb (970 kg)-2,510 lb (1,140 kg)
- Top speed 81 mph (130 km/h)-104 mph (167 km/h)

== Rekord B (1965–1966) ==
A transition model, the Rekord B offered only a mild facelift of the A but allowed Opel to avoid delay in introducing its new, more oversquare four-cylinder cam-in-head (CIH) engines (1500, 1700 S, 1900 S). The CIH engines were used in all subsequent Rekord generations until 1986, when the Rekord was replaced by the Opel Omega. The 2.6-litre six-cylinder engine remained unchanged. The line-up was identical to the Rekord A.

Prices in Germany: DM 6,980 to 9,570; power brakes: + DM 95, automatic gearbox: + 950, four-speed gearbox: + 95. 296,771 units.

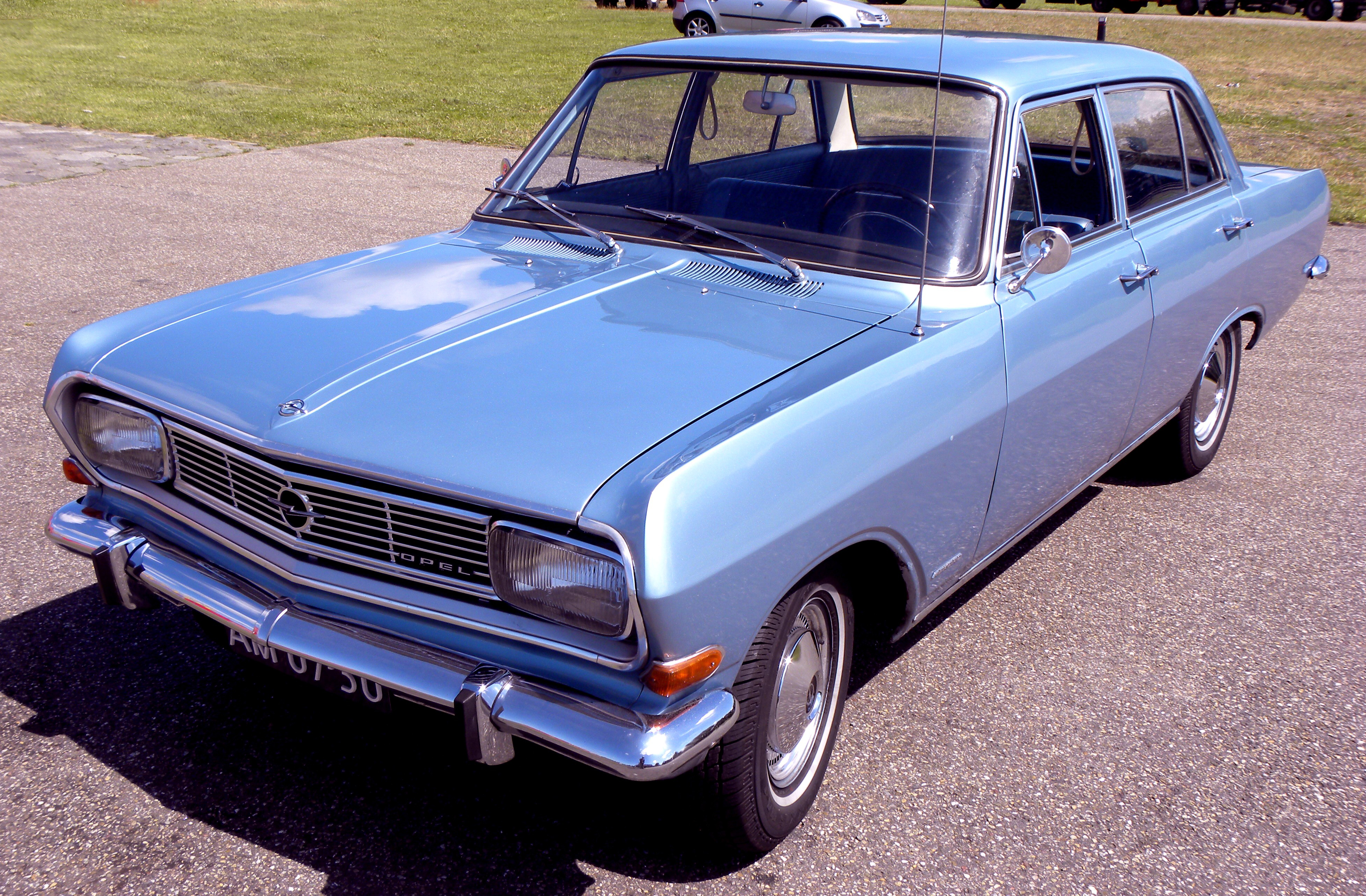
Opel Rekord B

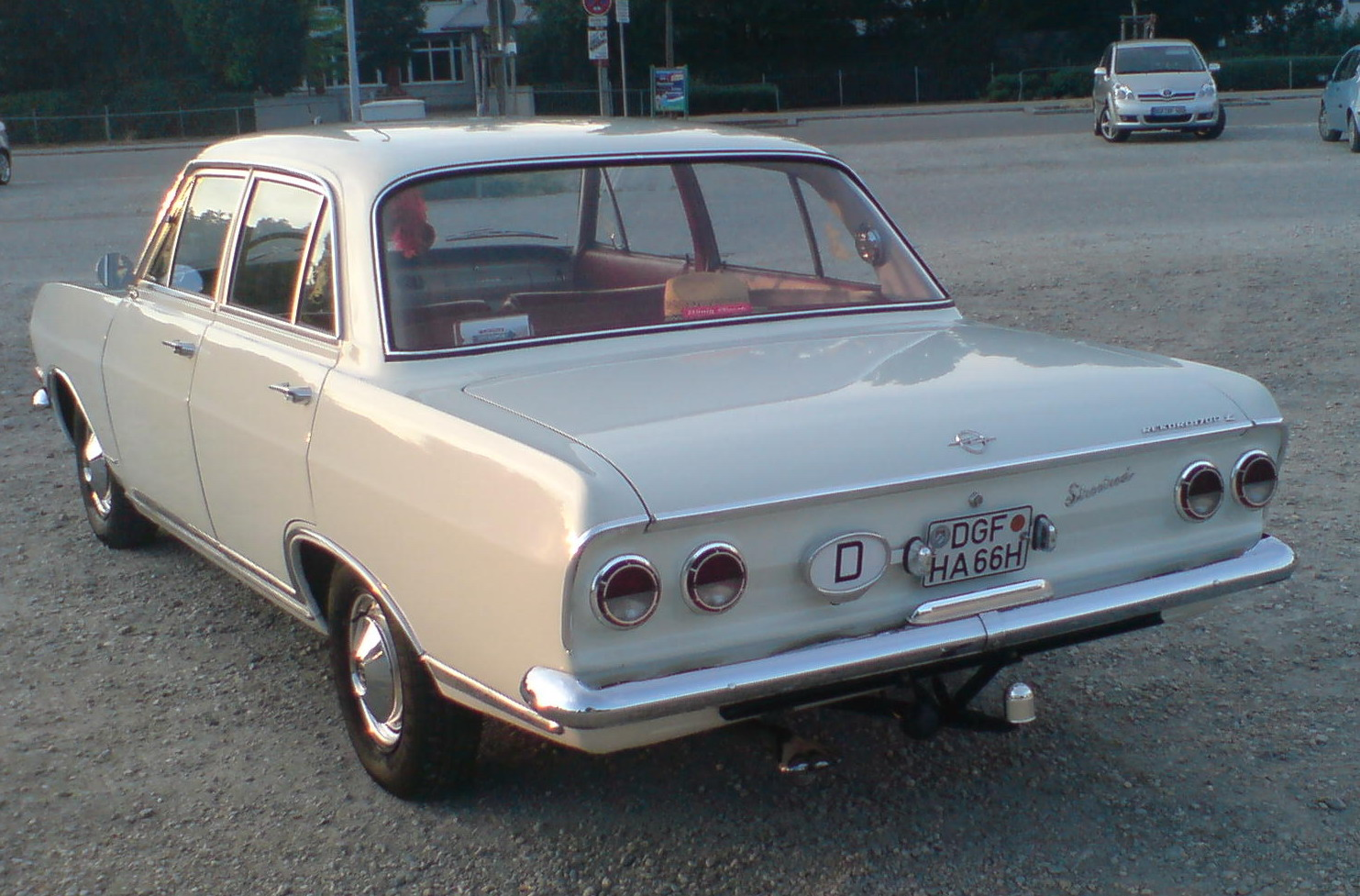
Opel Rekord B

General data:

- Engines: 1,492 cc, 60 PS (44 kW; 59 hp), or 1,698 cc, 75 PS (55 kW; 74 hp), or 1,897 cc, 90 PS (66 kW; 89 hp), or 2,605 cc, 100 PS (74 kW; 99 hp)
- Wheelbase 103.9 in (2,639 mm)
- Length 178.3 in (4,529 mm)
- Width 66.6 in (1,692 mm)
- Height 56.7 in (1,440 mm)
- Kerb weight from 2,190 lb (990 kg)
- Top speed 83 mph (134 km/h)-104 mph (167 km/h)

== Rekord C (1966–1971) ==
Rekord C
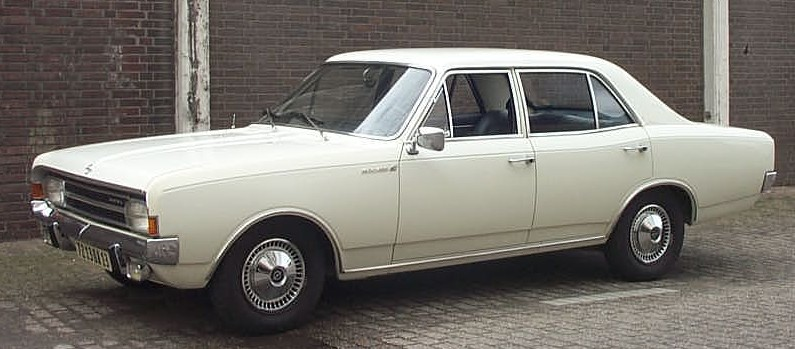

Overview
- Also called: Opel Olímpico (Mexico)
- Production: 1966–1971

Body and chassis
- Class: Large family car (D)
- Body style: 2/4-door sedan 3/5-door stationwagon 2-door coupé 3-door van
- Layout: FR layout
- Related: Opel Commodore; Chevrolet Opala

Powertrain
- Transmission: 3-speed manual 4-speed all-synchromesh manual 3-speed automatic

Dimensions
- Wheelbase: 105 in (2,700 mm)
- Length: 181 in (4,600 mm)
- Width: 69.25 in (1,759 mm)
- Height: 56.1 in (1,420 mm)

Chronology
- Predecessor: Opel Rekord B
- Successor: Opel Rekord D

The Rekord C was produced in a wide variety of body styles and inline four- and six-cylinder engines. It was roomy with its stylish coke-bottle line. A solid hit with the public, its 1,276,681 units sold made it the most successful Rekord to date.

The range consisted of the two- and four-door saloon, two- and (new) four-door estate, delivery van, and two-door hardtop coupé with 1500, 1700, 1700 S, 1900 S fours or (until 1968) a 2200 six. Very short-lived (1967 only) was a special taxi version on a longer wheelbase (113 inch) with division, that sold for DM 9,950; with it, Opel tried to get a foothold in the German taxi market, then (as now) dominated by Mercedes-Benz. Again, Karl Deutsch of Cologne offered a convertible version in limited numbers.

There existed several variations of the Rekord C, as well as version made under different names in different countries.

The former Rekord L-6 was replaced by the new Commodore A, a slightly disguised and better-equipped Rekord C available as two- and four-door sedan and hardtop coupé with six-cylinder engines only.

It was during the life of this model (in fact 1967–70) that the Opel Olympia name was revived, but in a separate, smaller car which was based on the period Opel Kadett.

After the launch of the smaller Ascona in September 1970, the Ascona supplanted some of the lower-cost versions of the Rekord and the smallest, 1.5-litre engine was discontinued.

=== Ranger ===
The Ranger was a Rekord-based range built at the Opel Continental plant in Antwerp, Belgium, for the overall European market. Styling was similar to the Rekord, although the Ranger had a four-headlamp grille setup, similar to the Vauxhall Victor FD range of the time. Initially, there were two models: Ranger 130 and Ranger 153. In 1970 additional models were announced, being the Ranger 1900 and Ranger 2500, and a "SS" variant, based on the Ranger 153.

There was also a South African Ranger, built in General Motors South Africa's plant Port Elizabeth. Known as 'South Africa's Own Car', it featured a springbok logo on its grille, and was also produced as a station wagon.

=== Other markets ===
The Rekord C was built as Chevrolet Opala and Comodoro in Brazil from 1968 onward, available in saloon, coupé and estate forms and featuring either Chevrolet's 2.5 L four, 3.8 L inline-six or 4.1 L inline-six. These models received several facelifts and remained in production until about 1992.

A Rekord C coupé was locally built in South Africa as a Ranger SS during the 1970s.

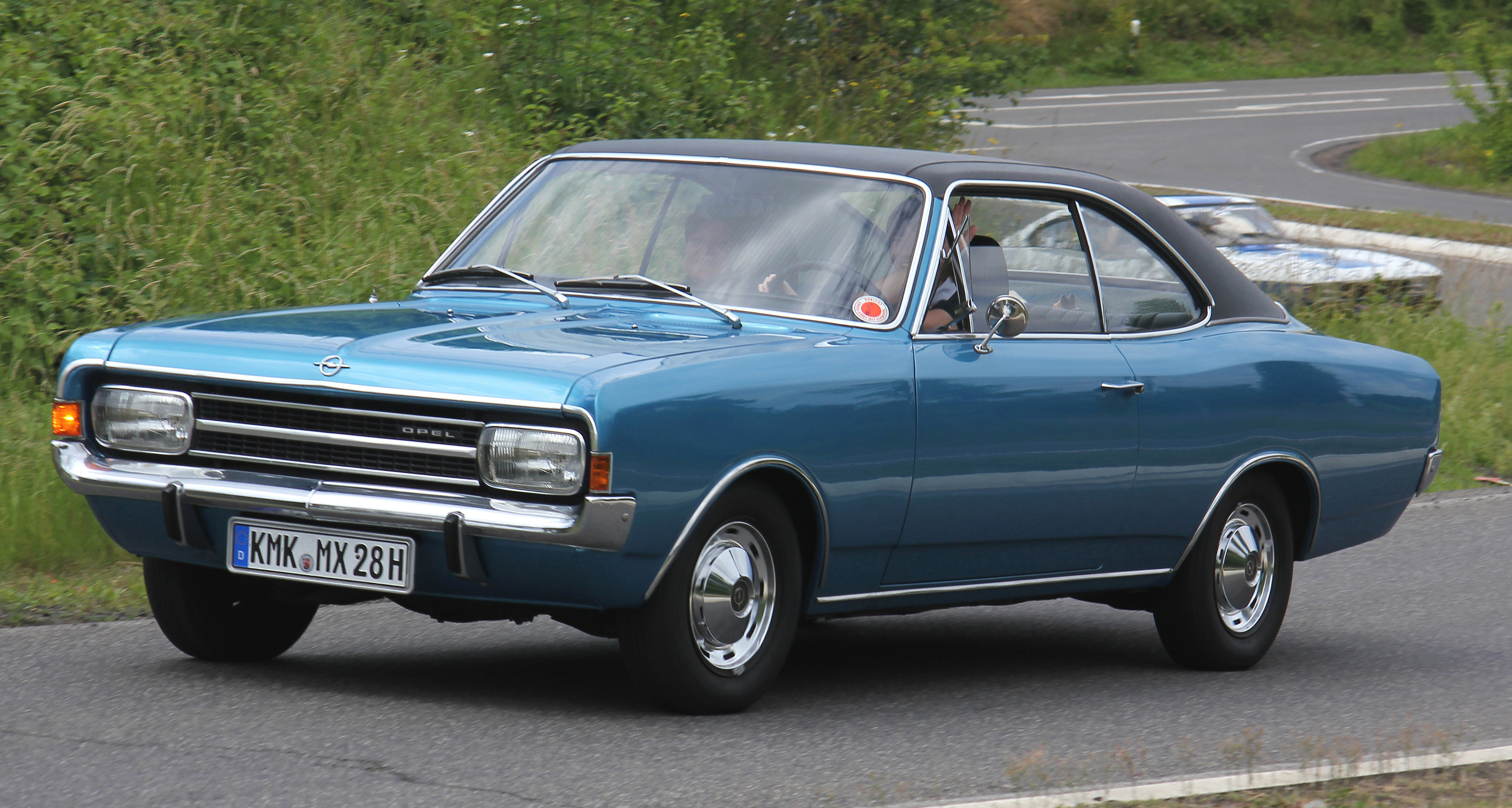
Opel Rekord C 1.9 S Coupé (1971)

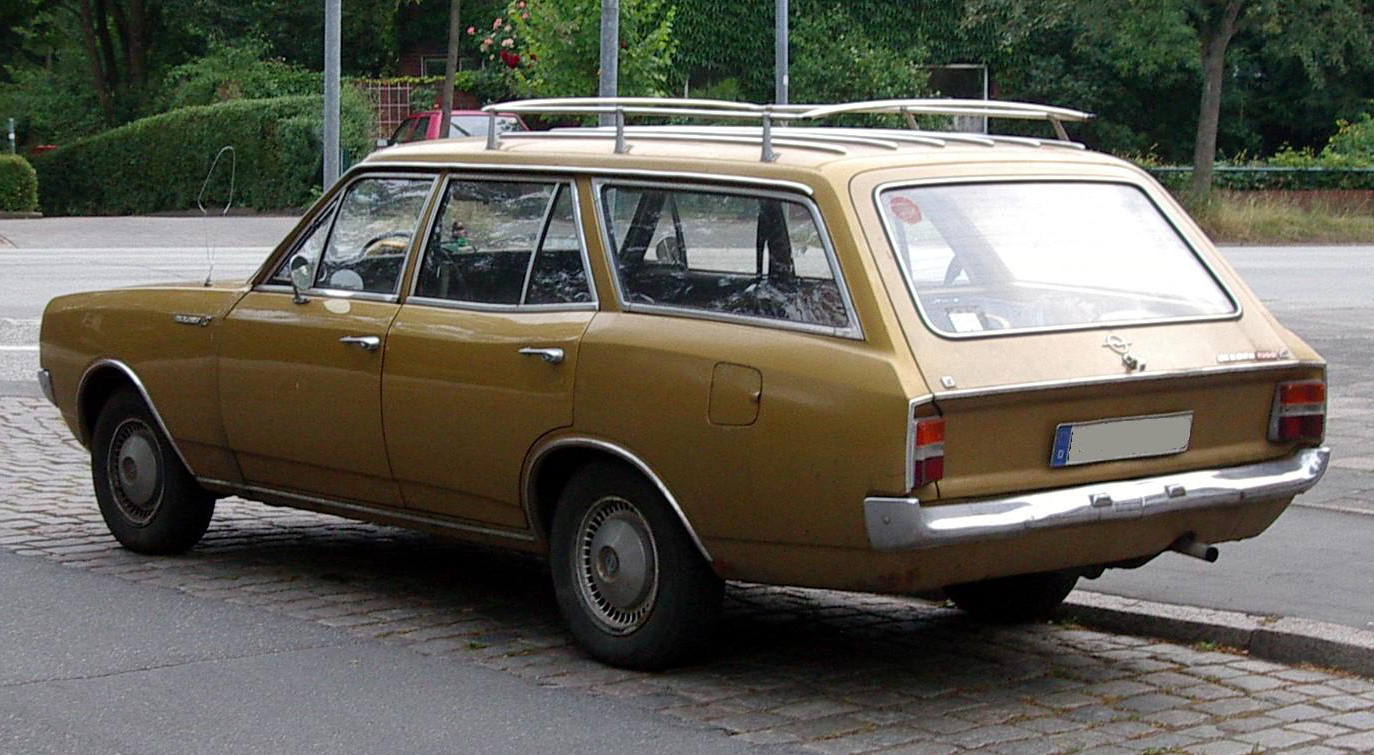
Opel Rekord C Estate ("CarAVan")

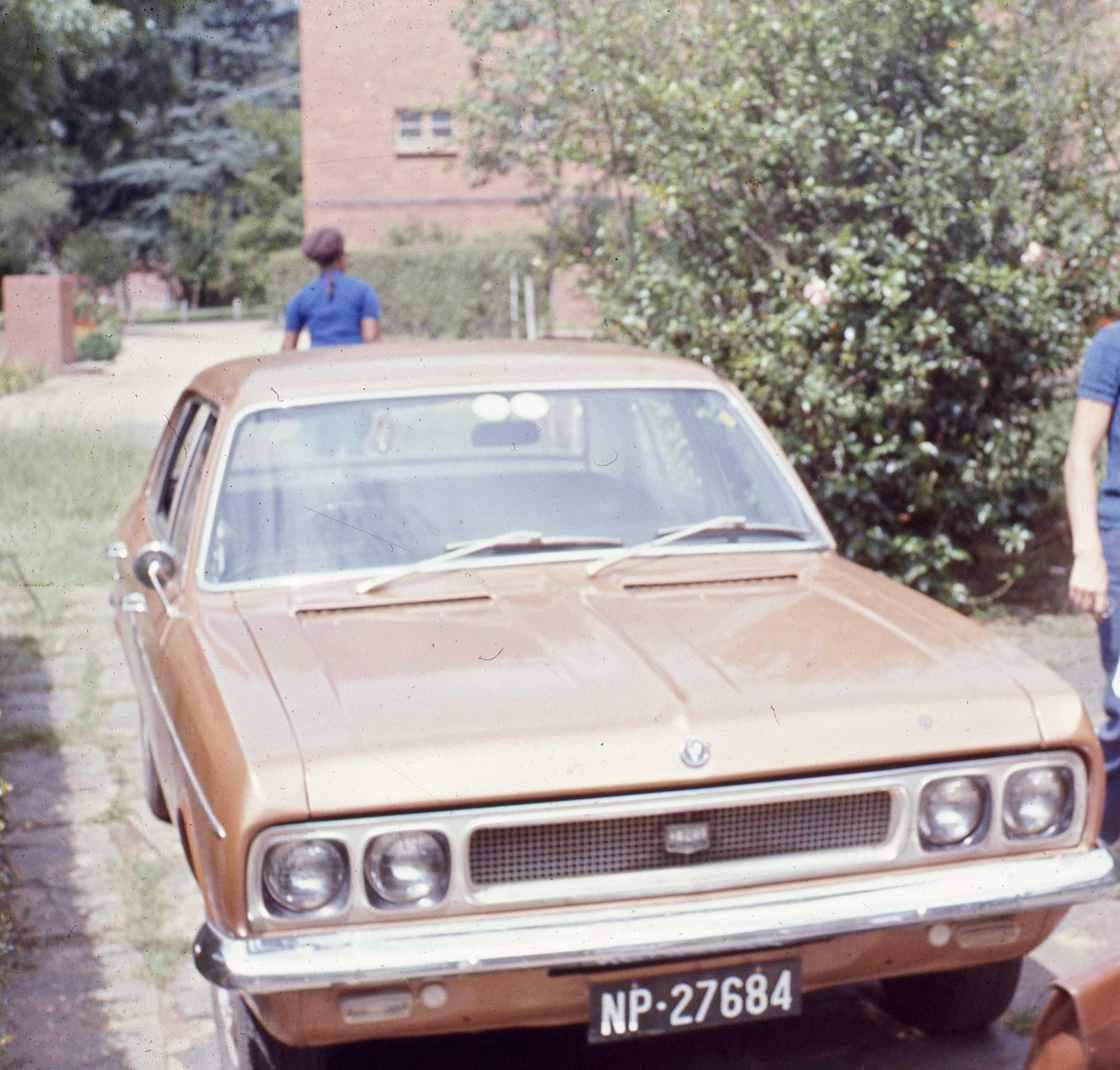
General Motors Ranger, South Africa

== Rekord D (1972–1977) ==
Rekord D
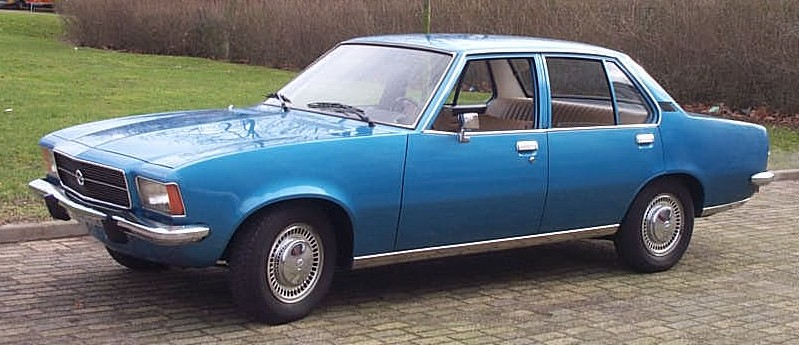

Overview
- Also called: Chevrolet Iran (IR); GMK Rekord (ROK); Ranger 1700 (CH / ZA / B); Ranger 1900 (CH / ZA / B); Ranger 2500 (CH / ZA / B)
- Production: 1972–1977

Body and chassis
- Class: Large family car (D)
- Body style: 2/4-door sedan 3/5-door station wagon 2-door coupé 3-door van
- Layout: FR layout
- Related: Opel Commodore, Vauxhall Victor FE

Dimensions
- Wheelbase: 105 in (2,700 mm)
- Length: 179.75 in (4,566 mm)
- Width: 67.375 in (1,711.3 mm)
- Height: 55.375 in (1,406.5 mm)

Chronology
- Predecessor: Opel Rekord C
- Successor: Opel Rekord E

About 1.1 million Rekord Ds were made. Because the name Rekord D was easily mistaken to connote a diesel-powered car, the name Rekord II was often used in sales literature. The first prototype was ready in 1971. The engine types available were 1897 cc or 1698 cc CIH (cam-in-head) four-cylinder gasoline engines. There was also a 2068 cc diesel version which was later accompanied by a smaller 2.0 litre version for certain markets. The diesel engine was higher than gasoline variants, so diesel model hoods have a raised midsection. The six-cylinder variant of this car is called the Commodore B. Transmissions available were standard four-speed manual with either floor or steering-column shifter and TH-180 automatic transmission. The body is of unitary construction. Body types available were two-door sedan, four-door sedan, three-door wagon, five-door wagon, two-door coupé and two-door van. There was also a variant called "Berlina" with more luxurious interior and wheels.

The Rangers were also transferred to this new generation, with the dropping of the 130 and 153 and the adding of a 1.7 L engine. In 1972, the line-up consisted of the base Ranger 1700, the mid-level Ranger 1900, and the top-of-the-line Ranger 2500. In 1974, a 2.8L engine was introduced to the Ranger family. However, by that time the Rangers were unpopular, and were discontinued after the 1976 model year. Most of these were sold exclusively in Continental Europe, especially the Benelux region.

South Africa used this body type for their Chevrolet 2500, 3800 and 4100 series. They looked visually almost identical but had the Chevrolet 2500 (4-cylinder) or 3800 and 4100 (6-cylinder) engines installed. They were available as four-door saloon or estate. The six-cylinder versions could be differentiated from the "fours" as they had four round headlights as opposed to the two rectangular units.

These cars were also assembled in Iran from 1974 till 1977 (before the revolution) under the local "Chevrolet Royale / or Chevrolet Iran" brand-name by Iran General Motors. The two models were 2500 and 2800 with 2.5L and 2.8L, respectively. The production of these vehicles ended in 1977 when the assembly line started producing the Chevrolet Nova, Buick Skylark, and Cadillac Seville cars until 1987. The Vauxhall FE Victor/VX4 also used the floorpan and basic body architecture of the Rekord D - but retained Vauxhall designed running gear and had no interchangeable body panels.

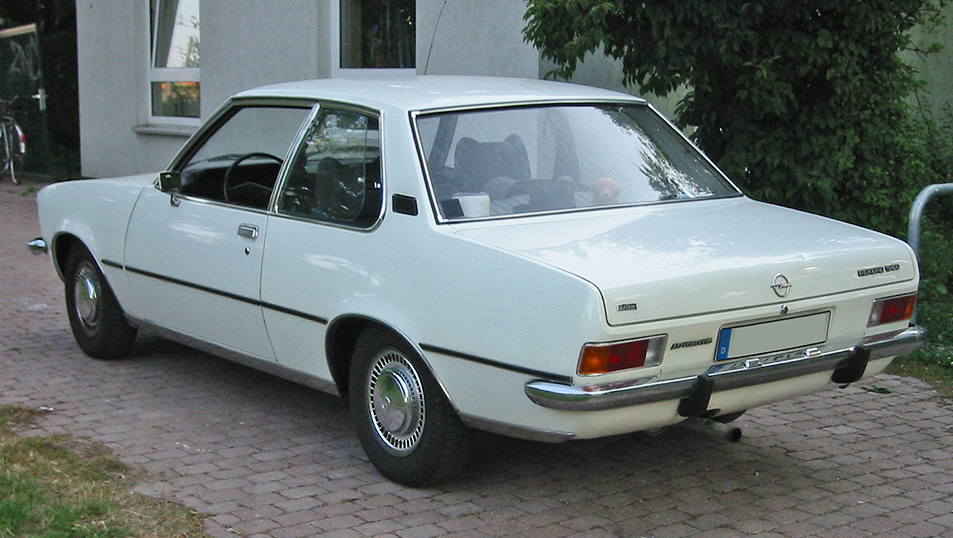
Opel Rekord D 2-door saloon

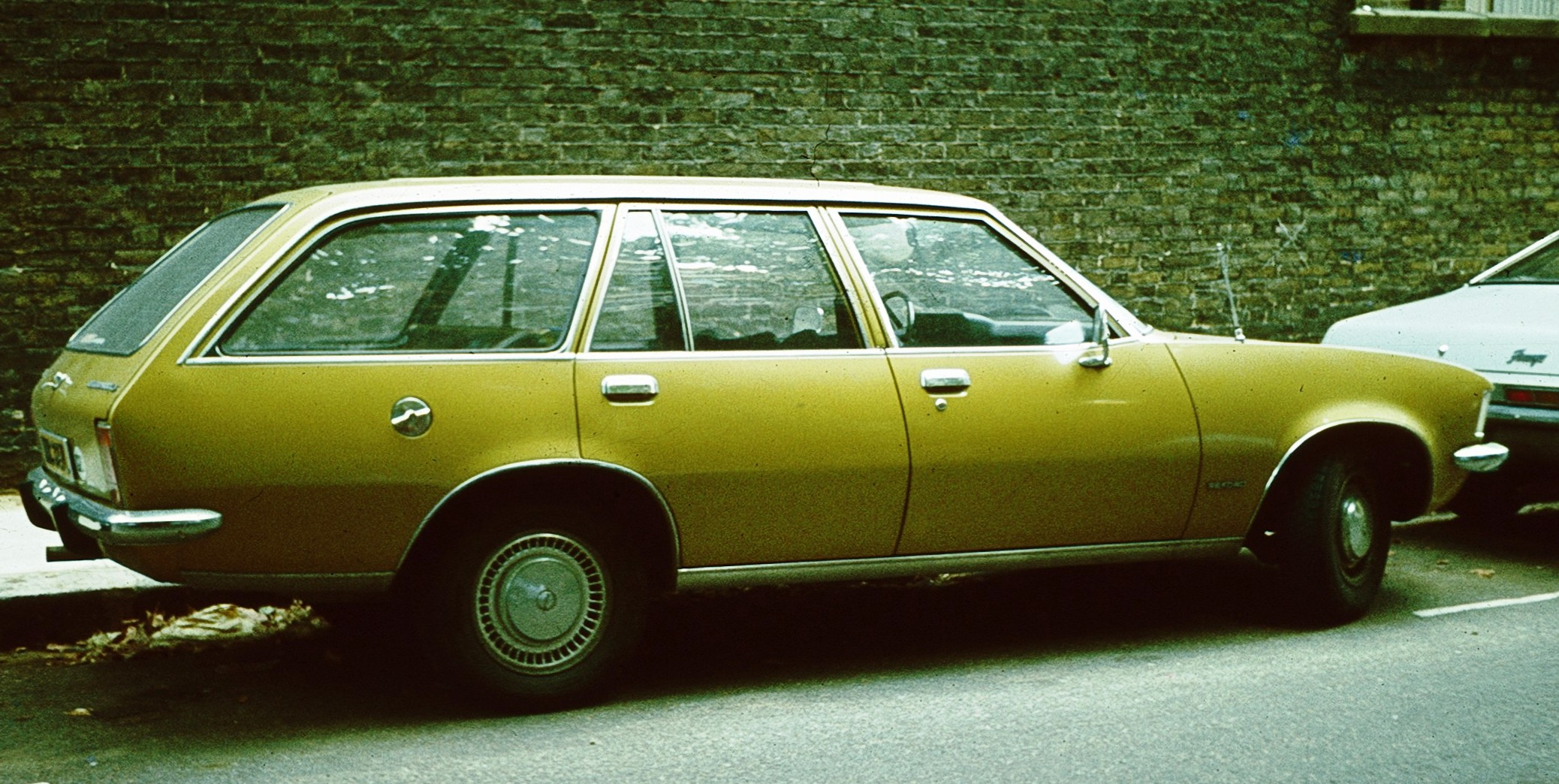
Opel Rekord D Caravan

== Rekord E (1977–1986) ==
Rekord Series E
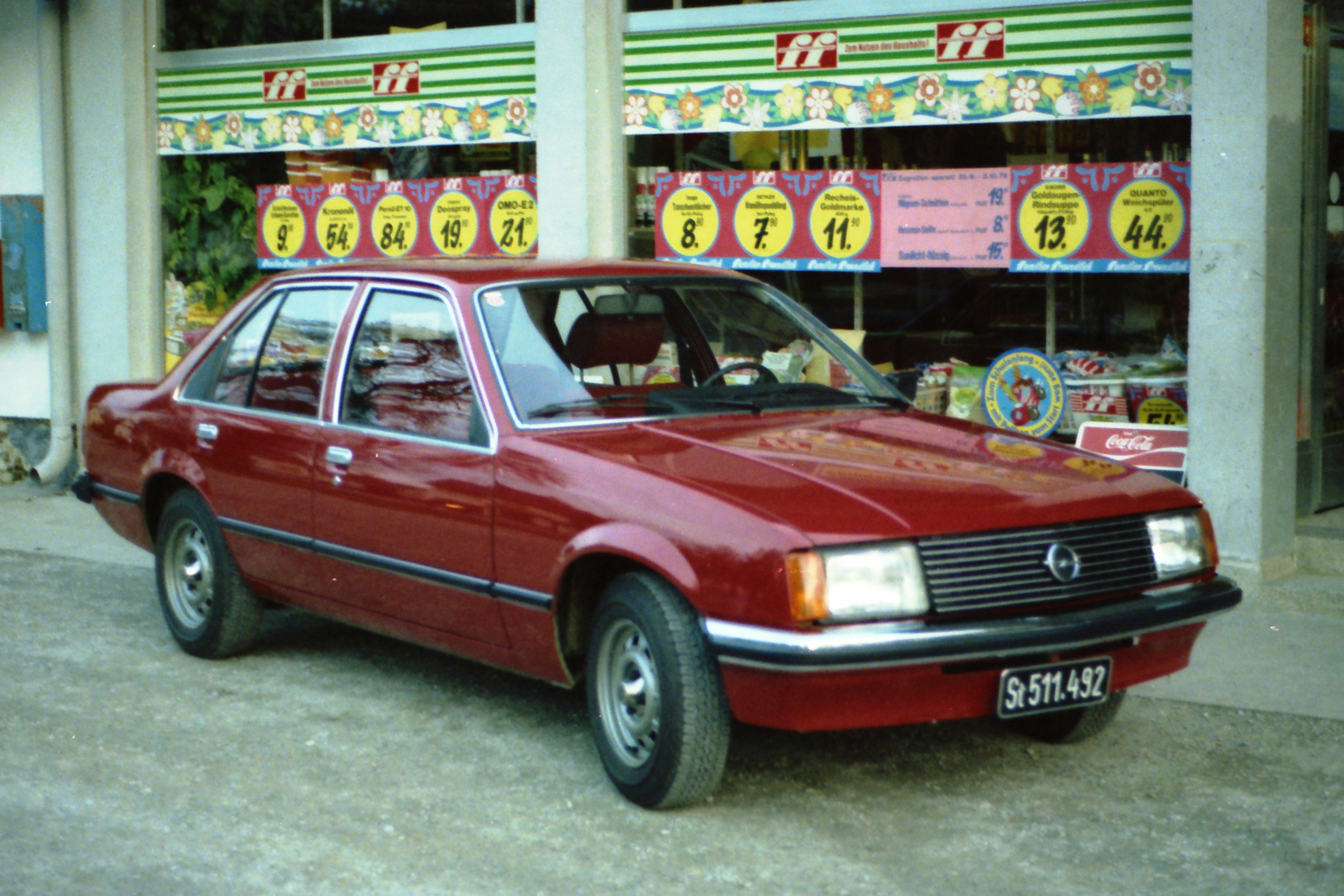

Overview
- Manufacturer: Opel
- Production: 1977–1986

Body and chassis
- Class: Large family car (D)
- Layout: FR layout
- Related: Holden Commodore (VB-VL); Vauxhall Carlton

Chronology
- Predecessor: Opel Rekord Series D
- Successor: Opel Omega

The E model can be subdivided into Rekord E1 (1977–82) and Rekord E2 (1982–86). Over 1.4 million units were made. The Rekord E was available as a two- or four-door sedan, and as a three- or five-door Caravan (station wagon). In some markets where the tax structure was suitable, a three-door van version was also available.

A version of the Rekord E was sold by Vauxhall in the United Kingdom from 1978 as the Carlton, with a restyled "droopsnoot" nose. Unlike the Rekord D, there was a much stronger correlation between the Rekord and its Vauxhall sister - now essentially being the same car apart from the aforementioned styling changes. Prior to the introduction of the facelift E2 in 1982, the Opel and Vauxhall versions were sold in competition with each other in the UK market. The Rekord and Carlton's differences in appearance vanished following the 1982 facelift, when most of the Opel range was withdrawn from sale in the UK. The E1 model was also sold in South Africa, initially as the Chevrolet Rekord, before being rebranded as an Opel in 1982, remaining in production until 1984. The E2 model remained in production in South Africa until the early 1990s, and was also available with a six-cylinder engine.

The Opel Rekord finished production in the autumn of 1986 when it was replaced by the Opel Omega, with the Vauxhall equivalent retaining the Carlton nameplate.

The Rekord E was also the basis for the first generation of the Holden Commodore, from the VB to the VL series versions. These versions of the Commodore were produced and sold in Australia and New Zealand from 1978 to 1988.

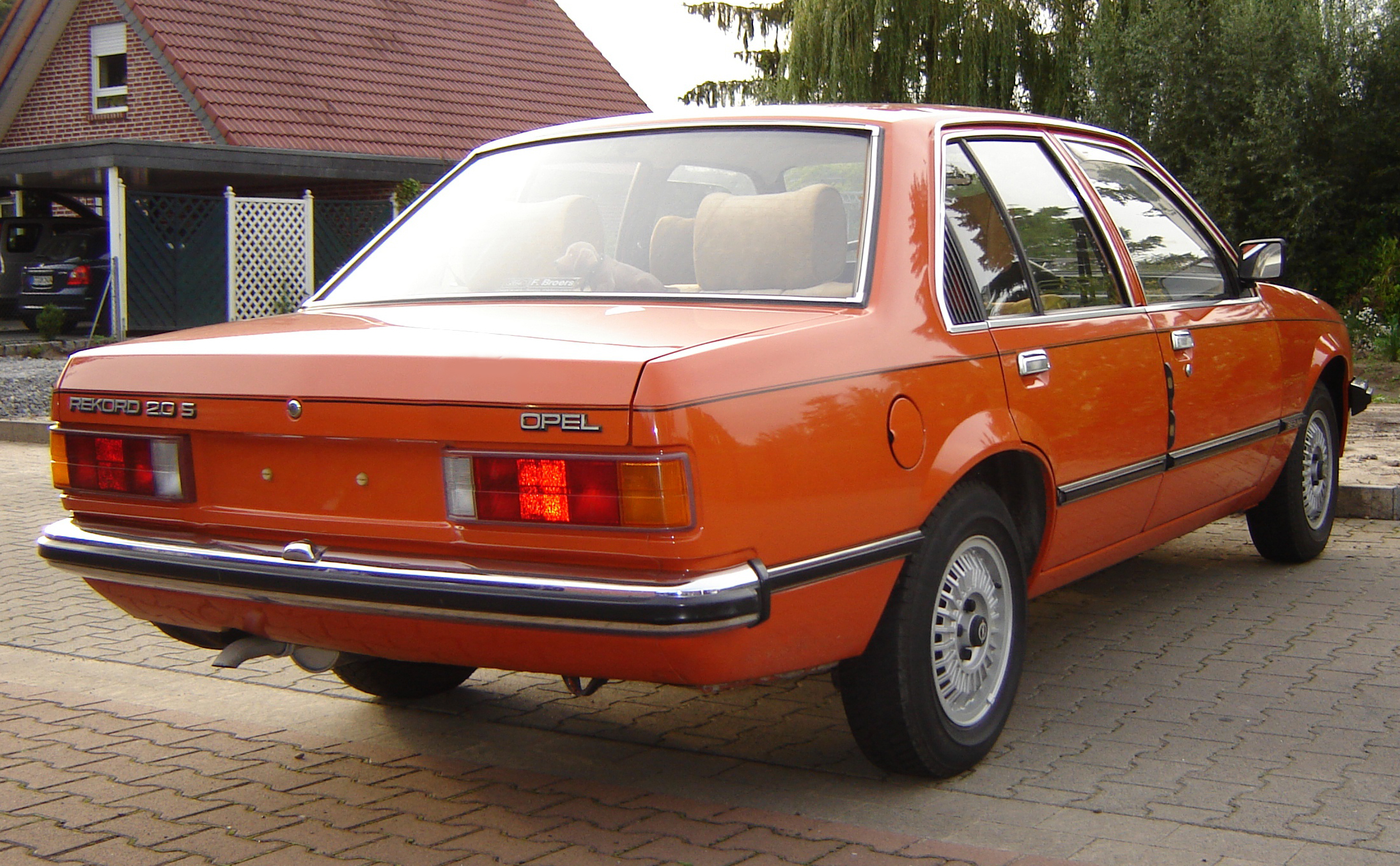
Rear view

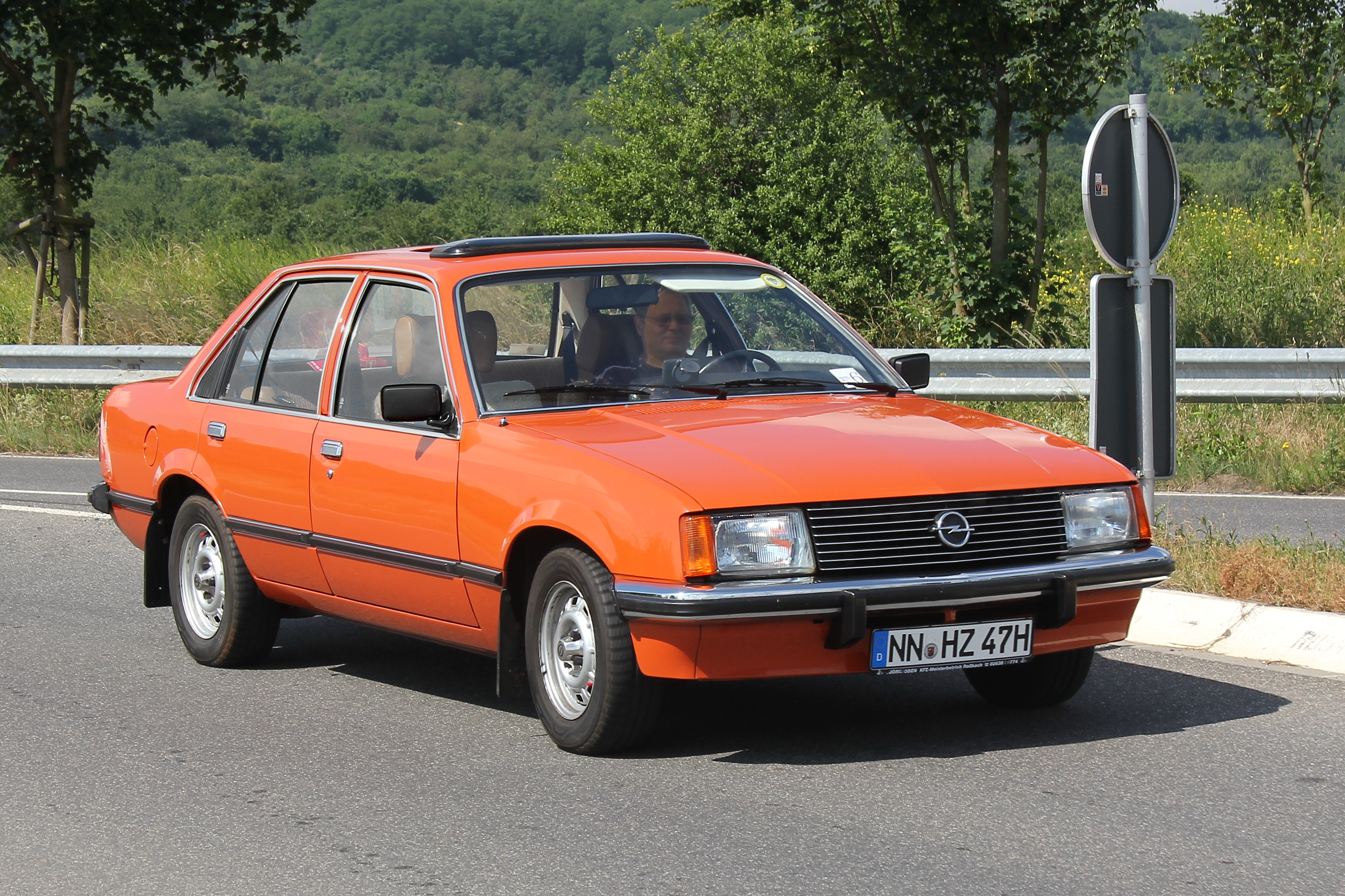
Opel Rekord (1977–1982)

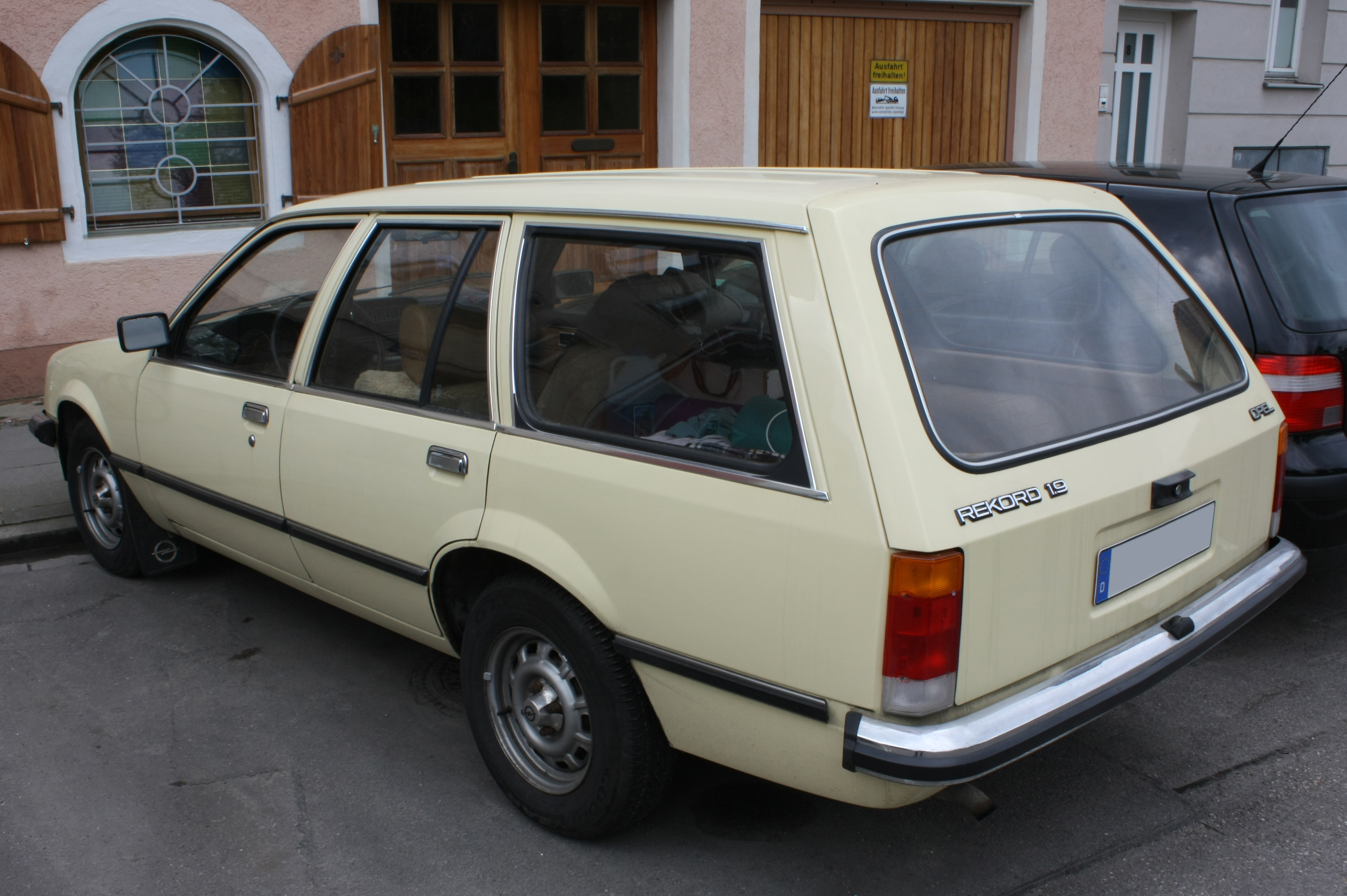
Opel Rekord Caravan (1977–1982)

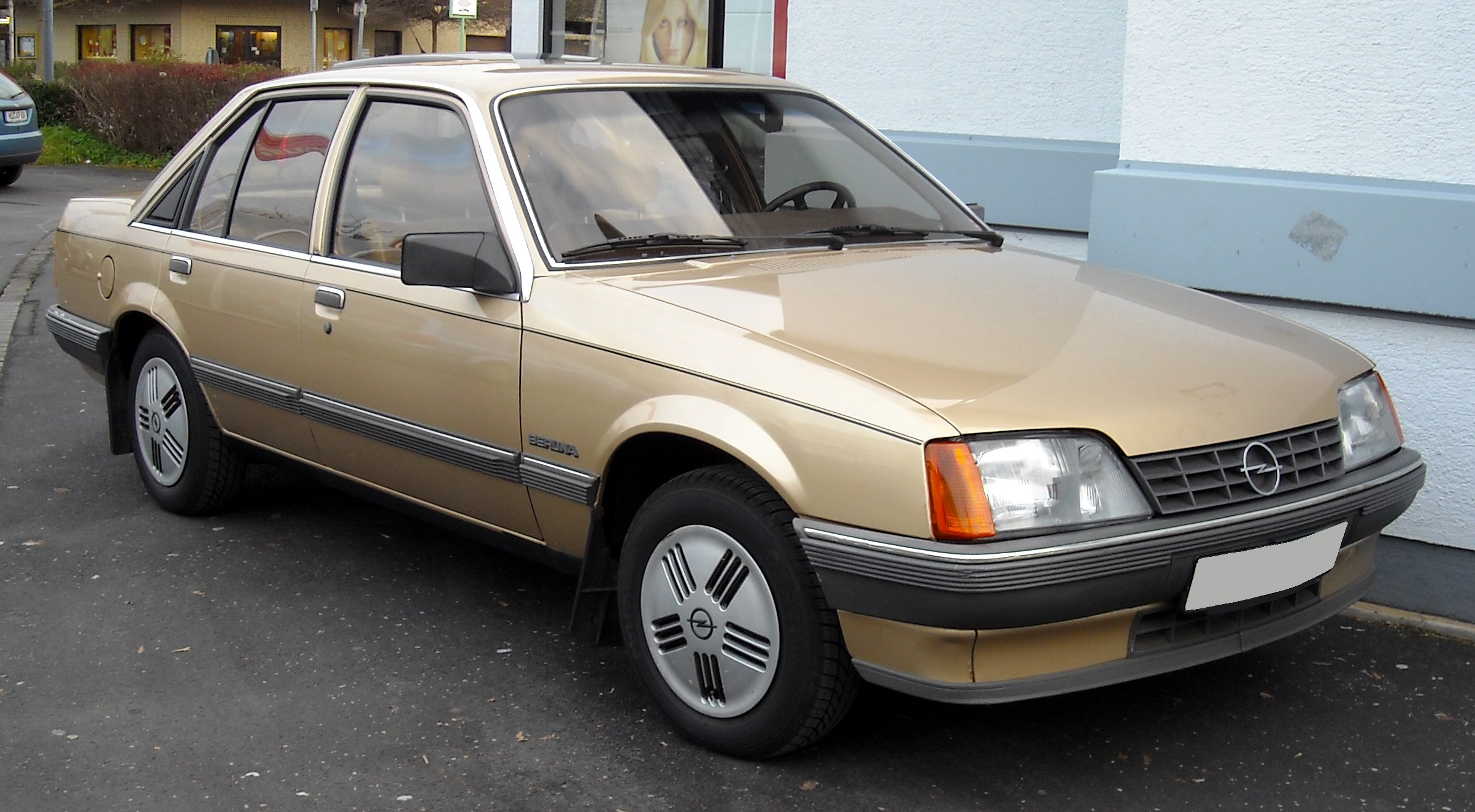
Opel Rekord E - facelift "E2" (1982–1986)
