= 1995 in motoring =

1995 in motoring includes developments in the automotive industry that occurred throughout the year 1995 by various automobile manufacturers, grouped by country. The automotive industry designs, develops, manufactures, markets, and sells motor vehicles.

== United Kingdom ==
Under the ownership of BMW, the Rover Group relaunched the 200 Series in a smaller hatchback format. It is larger than a supermini like the Ford Fiesta and Vauxhall Corsa.

The new 400 Series is now entirely different to the 200 Series, whereas before it was a saloon version of the hatchback. This time it is a five-door hatchback or four-door saloon, with the hatchback being a rebodied version of the new British-built Honda Civic. The 400 Series, however, uses its own K-Series 16-valve engines.

Rover this year launched the new MGF sports car, the first use of the MG marque since the closure of the Abingdon factory and end of MGB production in 1980. The MG badge was used on high performance Metro, Maestro and Montego models between 1982 and 1991. The MGF had a mid-mounted 1.8 16-valve engine. By the end of the year, demand for the new MG was outstripping supply.

Vauxhall retired the Cavalier nameplate after 20 years, and adopted the name Vectra for its new large family car. An estate version would launch in late 1996. Power came from 1.6, 1.8 and 2.0 16-valve petrol engines as well as a 2.0 turbo-diesel. A 2.5 V6 unit was also planned, capable of almost 150 mph, at a later date. While it received some criticism from the motoring press, it still becomes a top-seller in its class.

Ford gave its six-year-old Fiesta a redesign of the exterior and interior in October becoming the MK4 along with a retuning of the chassis and the introduction of new 1.25 and 1.4 Zetec petrol engines. The 1.3 Endura E petrol engine remained for the entry-level models, while the 1.0 and 1.1 HCS (High Compression Swirl) units were shelved. A rebadged version, the Mazda 121, launched shortly afterwards but would sell in much smaller numbers. The previous Fiesta remained on sale until the following year as the Fiesta Classic, consisting of special edition models with lower prices and increased standard kit and was then planned to be replaced by a new city car which was designed to compete with the likes of the Fiat Cinquecento. The Escort received a major facelift and became the MK6 in January with new front-end styling and a redesigned interior in a bid to keep it competitive in its class, ironing out most of the faults of the MK5 launched 5 years earlier. The VW-produced Galaxy MPV went on sale in June.

== France ==
Peugeot launched a new Pininfarina-styled 406 saloon, replacement for the 405 in 1.8 and 2.0 petrol units with a 3.0 V6 planned. 405 estate production continued until mid-1997, when the 406 estate went on sale. UK sales started in February 1996.

Renault ended R19 production after seven years, but most of its mechanicals were carried over to the new Mégane range. Like its predecessor, the Megane was available as a five-door hatchback and four-door saloon. Coupe and cabriolet bodystyles were also planned, as well as an estate car (for which there are no plans for British sales), with a 1.9 turbo-diesel unit. UK sales started in April 1996. Renault also launches an estate version of the Laguna in the Autumn which replaces the R21 Savanna/Nevada after nearly a decade.

Citroen launches an estate version of the Xantia in the Autumn around the same time as the rival Renault Laguna model.

== Italy ==
European Car of the Year for the 1996 model year was the Fiat Brava and Bravo. The Brava is a five-door "fastback", and the "Bravo" was a three-door hatchback. Both replaced the Tipo. Power came from 1.4, 1.6, 1.8 and 2.0 petrol engines, though only the Bravo gets the 2.0 engine in HGT V5 form. The Brava and Bravo were to form the basis of the forthcoming Marea saloon and estate.

Alfa Romeo revived two of its previous names for its reentry into the sports car market. GTV was last seen in 1987 on an aerodynamic coupe, and now reappeared on a 2.0 engined 2+2 coupe. Spider was the nameplate used by a two-seater roadster between 1966 and 1993, and now reappeared on the open top version of the GTV. The Spider was identically styled to the GTV, but had no rear seats and was more expensive.

== Sweden ==
Volvo launched its new S40 saloon and V40 estate ranges. Power came from four-cylinder 1.6, 1.8, 2.0 and 2.4 petrol engines. The new "S" and "V" initials denoted a new branding method for the Volvo range, showing the difference between saloon and estate bodystyles. The 850 nameplate was planned for use in a later redesign, which was expected to be a coupe version with the "C" initial.

== Germany ==
Mercedes-Benz launched a new E-Class in the summer as a saloon first with an estate to follow later.

Volkswagen ceased production of the Corrado coupe after seven years with no direct replacement.

Volkswagen and Ford went into a joint venture to produce a new people carrier. Ford's version was badged as the Galaxy and launched first in June, while the Volkswagen equivalent was named the Sharan and launched in August. Both vehicles share the same exterior design, chassis and engines, and the third car based on this design was planned for the following year badged as a SEAT.

== See also ==
- 1994 in motoring - the previous year
- 1996 in motoring - the next year
