= 2002 in motoring =

2002 in motoring deals with developments in the automotive industry that occurred throughout the year 2002 by various automobile manufacturers, grouped by country.

== United Kingdom ==
Ford ends 90 years of building cars in Britain when the Dagenham plant finishes Fiesta production in February, but it will remain open for the production of vans and the development of engines. The new fifth-generation Fiesta, will be built at the Valencia plant in Spain. The 5-door hatchback launched first with the 3-door launching in December. Its front-wheel drive chassis is used for an estate/MPV crossover called the Fusion. Another addition to the range will be a Peugeot-sourced 1.4-liter turbo-diesel engine. The Escort name was retired after 34 years when the last van models were produced and was replaced with the Transit Connect late in the year. The Puma coupe ends production after five years as the ST170 and RS versions of the Focus launch.

Vauxhall introduces a second-generation Vectra which continues to be built in Britain, moving production to Ellesmere Port.

Land Rover introduces new version of Range Rover at the start of the year while the smaller Discovery gets a facelift four years after the launch of the current generation with Range Rover styling cues.

== France ==
The new Renault Mégane earns the European Car of the Year award, and offers a 1.9-liter direct-injection diesel engine. The initial bodystyles are three- and five-door hatchbacks.

The new Renault Mégane achieves the full five-star Euro NCAP making it the first small family car in Europe to do so.

Renault has also re-entered the executive car sector with the Vel Satis, a five-door luxury hatchback.

Citroën Saxo production is winding down after six years following the launch of the new C3, a five-door hatchback. Saxo production will continue for another year until the launch of the new C2.

The Eurovan venture between Peugeot, Citroën and Fiat has been renewed in an all-new format. Fiat retains the Ulysse nameplate, but the Citroën Synergie becomes the C8 and the Peugeot 806 becomes the 807. Left-hand drive markets will get the Lancia Phedra.

== Germany ==
The Volkswagen Polo has been relaunched in a new fourth generation format, sharing its underpinnings with the Škoda Fabia that was launched two years prior.

The BMW 7 Series is updated. A similarly styled update for the smaller 5 Series is due for the following year.

The latest Mercedes E Class is introduced, which resembles the smaller C Class and the larger S Class.

== Spain ==
The third generation SEAT Ibiza goes on sale at the same time as the new Volkswagen Polo upon which it is mechanically based. A Córdoba saloon version comes with a boot.

== Eastern Europe ==
The six-year-old Volkswagen Passat design has been tweaked to become the Czech-built Superb.

== Japan ==
Honda launched a new supermini, the Jazz.

Honda also launched a new version of Accord large family car.

The Nissan Micra has a new version with styling that blends modern and retro.
