= 2001 in motoring =

This article 2001 in motoring deals with developments in the automotive industry that occurred throughout the year 2001 by various automobile manufacturers, grouped by country.

== United Kingdom ==
One year after being sold by BMW, MG Rover launched the ZR, ZS, and ZT/ZT-T sports models. The ZR is based on the Rover 25 supermini. The ZS is based on the Rover 45 family hatchback and saloon. The ZT is based on the Rover 75 executive saloon. The ZT-T is the MG version of the Rover 75 Tourer estate which also launched in that year.

Production of the new BMW-built MINI began in the summer.

Jaguar introduced the X-Type, a compact executive saloon with four-wheel drive that shares its underpinnings with Ford's recently launched front-wheel drive Mondeo. It also shares its 2.5 V6 engine with the Mondeo.

Land Rover has launched the third generation Range Rover L332 with a new bodyshell. Sales began in early 2002.

== France ==
The Peugeot 306 made way for the new 307 and Europe's motoring journalists voted it European Car of the Year. 3- and 5-door hatchbacks launched first in June while production of the 306 estate and cabriolet will continue for another year until the 307-based successors are launched.

The Citroën Xantia ended production to be replaced by the new C5 in March with hatchback and estate versions.

The Renault Clio supermini received a facelift in June.

The Renault Laguna is the first car to receive all 5 stars in Euro NCAP crash test ratings making it the safest European vehicle on sale.

== Germany ==
Audi has brought out a new Cabriolet based on its recently launched A4 saloon.

== Italy ==
The new Fiat Stilo went on sale in Europe.

== Japan ==
The new Corolla family car was launched.

Honda entered the supermini market with the Jazz.

The first major product of the Nissan-Renault venture has appeared - the Nissan Primera. It shares its underpinnings with the latest Renault Laguna.
