= 2000 in motoring =

2000 in motoring deals with developments in the automotive industry that occurred throughout the year 2000 by various automobile manufacturers, grouped by country.

== United Kingdom ==
Ford launched its new Mondeo in October including 1.8 and 2.0 four-cylinder petrol units, a 2.0 turbo-diesel and a 2.5 V6 petrol with hatchback, saloon and estate models.

The Escort was discontinued in July while the van version would continue into 2002.

The Galaxy MPV received a major facelift in the Summer.

Vauxhall expanded the Astra range to include a new coupe and cabriolet. It entered the roadster market with the VX220 (Opel Speedster on the continent) with a turbocharged 2.0 and natural aspirated 2.2 engine and a chassis derived from the Lotus Elise. The Corsa supermini was replaced by a new model in the Autumn with production again continuing in Spain.

BMW sold the Rover Group after six years of ownership. Land Rover became part of Ford Motor Company, while the new Mini was retained to be produced by BMW with a new version to launch next year. The original Mini ceased production in October. The remainder of the company was sold to an independent group called the Phoenix Consortium and became MG Rover Group.

== Italy ==
The new Alfa Romeo 147 hatchback was named European Car of the Year. It is based on the chassis of the 1998 winner, the 156. Sales would commence in early 2001. A 3-door model arrived first with the 5-door arriving shortly afterwards. The 156 estate, called the SportWagon would also launch.

== Germany ==
Audi launched the new A4 in saloon and estate versions in the Autumn. Another launch was the A2, similar in concept to the Mercedes A-Class with a futuristic design and aluminium construction.

Volkswagen gave the Polo supermini a facelift at the start of the year, fitting all models with power steering, twin airbags, anti-lock brakes and a 12-year anti-corrosion warranty as standard. A 1.6 GTI model was also introduced. The Sharan also received a facelift, alongside the related Ford Galaxy and SEAT Alhambra. The end of the year saw a facelifted Passat launch with a more upmarket look.

BMW has launched two models this year with a new version of the latest 3-Series range, the Compact hatchback and the European launch of the X5 off-roader, having first launched in the US in September 1999. A facelifted 5-Series arrived in the Autumn.

The Mercedes-Benz C Class entered its second-generation with the look of the much larger S Class and is built in South Africa alongside Germany. The saloon launched first while estate and coupe models would follow later.

== France ==
The Renault Laguna entered its second-generation at the end of the year and is available as a hatchback or estate (Sports Tourer) and offered with 1.6 and 1.8 four-cylinder petrol engines, as well as a 3.0 V6 petrol and a 1.9 direct-injection diesel. The Twingo received a mild update and the Espace was given a mild facelift with new trim level designations that would soon appear elsewhere in the Renault range.

Peugeot launches the 206CC, a cabriolet model that's similar in concept to the Mercedes SLK with a 2-piece hard folding roof.

After 11 years amidst declining sales, Citroen ends production of the executive XM model with no direct replacement in June while at the same time UK sales start of the Xsara Picasso compact MPV. The Autumn sees a facelifted Xsara range launched while a Xantia replacement is also planned for 2001.

== Japan ==
Nissan has launched a new Almera small-family car to join the current Micra and Primera at the British Sunderland plant at the start of the year. Engines include 1.5 and 1.8 petrol engines as well as a 2.2 diesel, provided by Renault. It is offered as a 3 or 5-door hatchback and a saloon. The ageing Micra received a mild facelift to bring it in line with the rest of the Nissan range.

Toyota introduced a facelifted Corolla as well as adding new VVTi petrol engines. The Avensis also received similar changes and the new engines.

Honda introduced a new Civic, offering 1.4 or 1.6 petrol engines. The models available in Britain was the five-door hatchback and 2-door coupe from the US. A 3-door hatchback would launch later alongside a sporty Type-R model.
