= 1996 in motoring =

1996 in motoring includes with developments in the automotive industry that occurred throughout the year 1996 by various automobile manufacturers, grouped by country. The automotive industry designs, develops, manufactures, markets, and sells motor vehicles.

== United Kingdom ==
Ford made its first entry into the city car market with the Fiesta-based Ka, a three-door hatchback powered by the company's 1.3 litre Endura E petrol engine and launched in September, replacing the MK3 Fiesta Classic. It also gave a facelift to its three-year-old Mondeo range in October.

Jaguar ceased XJS production after 21 years and replaced it with the new XK8. There was also a new 4.0 V8 engined coupe and cabriolet range.

== France ==
Renault launched the Scénic, a five-seater mini MPV based on the Mégane hatchback running gear. Its 1.4, 1.6 and 1.8 petrol engines are sourced from the Mégane hatchback range, as was the 1.9 turbo-diesel. It launched in France in November 1996 while UK sales began in May 1997. Renault also launched a facelifted Safrane in July while the smaller Clio also received a facelift in the Autumn to keep it competitive until a new version would arrive. After 24 years and 2 generations, Renault ends production of the R5 which was offered alongside the Clio as a budget model and also marks the end of numerical badged Renault's.

At the upper end of the MPV market, Renault redesigned the Espace in a new format for the first time since its launch in 1984 with French sales starting in December while a larger version of it is also planned.

Peugeot gave its five-year-old 106 supermini a facelift in July, while Citroën adopted the design for its AX replacement. The new Saxo which launched in the Spring came in 1.0, 1.1, 1.4 and 1.6-litre engined "VTR" and "VTS" hatchback models as well as a 1.5 diesel. A 3-door model arrived first with a 5-door model to follow later.

== Germany ==
Volkswagen launched a new version of its Passat which launched first in Germany and Continental Europe and later in the UK and the US, eight years after the previous generation Passat was launched and three years since the Passat received its latest redesign. Engines ranged from a 1.6 petrol to a 2.8 V6, along with a 1.9 turbo-diesel.

BMW replaced the 5 Series medium-sized executive model with a new model after eight years in the Spring. The 5 Series was visually similar to its predecessor. A saloon launched first with an estate to follow later.

Audi launched the A3, a three-door hatchback based on the MK3 VW Golf in the Autumn powered by 1.6, 1.8 and 2.0 petrol engines as well as the 1.9 turbo-diesel.

A new addition to the Mercedes range was the SLK – a two-seater sports car with a folding convertible-style steel roof and a supercharged 2.3 litre engine capable of 150 mph. It was designed as a direct competitor to two new rival sports cars that have recently come from Germany – the Porsche Boxster which launched in the same year and the BMW Z3, due for a European launch.

== Spain ==
SEAT moved into the multi-purpose vehicle market with the Alhambra. It used the same design as the Volkswagen Sharan and Ford Galaxy, as well as the same engines, and was built alongside these cars in Portugal. Sales began in June 1996.

== Japan ==
Honda launched a new version of its Prelude sporting coupe.

The Nissan Primera had its second generation launched, six years after replacing the Bluebird. Like its predecessor it was built at the Sunderland plant in northern England. Nissan's Japanese plant also produced a version of the Primera; while the American version was badged as the Infiniti G20. Sales began in October 1996, the same time as Ford's facelifted Mondeo.

== See also ==
- 1995 in motoring – the previous year
- 1997 in motoring – the next year
