= 1994 in motoring =

1994 in motoring includes developments in the automotive industry that occurred throughout the year 1994 by various automobile manufacturers, grouped by country. The automotive industry designs, develops, manufactures, markets, and sells motor vehicles.

== United Kingdom ==
British Aerospace sold the Rover Group to BMW, with three of Rover's oldest nameplates retired by the end of the year. The Maestro and Montego ranges ceased production, while the Metro no longer existed in name but the car itself was redesigned and sold as the Rover 100 series from December. This included a new 1.5 diesel unit on offer, while the 1.1 and 1.4 petrol engines were carried over from the Metro.

Rover's next generation 400 Series – which went on sale in 1995 – was a clone of the upcoming Honda Civic, while the new 200 Series was the first in-house Rover design since the 1984 Montego.

Ford ceased production of the Granada after 9 years to make way for the new Scorpio. Power comes from a 2.0 16-valve unit, as well as 2.3 16-valve and 2.9 V6 units. The car comes as a saloon or an estate with the hatchback dropped from the range. It would soon gain notoriety for its exterior design from the motoring press and would also be axed without a replacement after 4 years on sale. In the Spring, Ford returned to the coupe market with the American-sourced Probe which offered 2.0 16v or 2.5 V6 24v engines.

Vauxhall replaced the Carlton with the new Omega in April – the latest model to adopt a continental Opel nameplate. Like its predecessor, the Omega was a large rear-wheel drive range of saloons and estates. It was the first Vauxhall launched with the new "V" grille which would soon appear across the range and the facelifted Astra that launched in the Autumn would be the next model to feature it. The larger Senator model was axed from the line-up effectively being replaced by higher-spec versions of the Omega.

== Germany ==
Audi ceased use of the 80 nameplate after 22 years for the launch of a new compact executive saloon – the A4. It was available as a four-door saloon (with "Avant" estate versions to follow), with engines ranging from a 1.6 to a 2.8 V6. There was also 1.9 turbo-diesel. European sales commenced in early 1995. Meanwhile, the long-running 100 nameplate would be renamed A6.

Volkswagen launched a new Polo in October, 13 years after the second generation version went on sale (though it was facelifted in 1990). The new Polo was based on the previous year's SEAT Ibiza, using the same chassis. Power came from the 1.3 unit as well as a 1.6 from the larger Golf, though the older engine was later replaced by the Ibiza's 1.0 and 1.4 engines as well as a 1.9 diesel (turbo or non-turbo). Volkswagen also planned to sell the Polo as a saloon and estate. The hatchback was available with three or five doors.

== Italy ==
European Car of the Year for the 1995 model year was the Fiat Punto, successor to the Uno and designed by Giorgetto Giugiaro. UK sales started in April.

Alfa Romeo replaced the 33 after 11 years production with the 145, a three-door hatchback which had the appearance of an estate, and the 146 five-door "fastback" which launched in May 1995.

== France ==
April 1994 saw the British launch of the Renault Laguna, launched on the continent at the end of 1993, to compete with the Ford Mondeo.

The scaling back of the Peugeot 205 range, now more than a decade old, continued with the end of production of the GTI model in April, following the arrival of quicker versions of the smaller 106 and larger 306.

Citroen launches an estate version of the ZX in May which also coincides with a mid-cycle facelift for the model. The BX estate ends production in July while the larger XM also received a mid-life facelift in June.

== Eastern Europe ==
Following the 1993 takeover of Skoda by Volkswagen, the Felicia was a redesigned version of the 1988 Favorit. The existing 1.3 unit was joined by a 1.6 petrol and a 1.9 diesel engine which were also found in the Volkswagen Golf, Volkswagen Polo and SEAT Ibiza. The five-door hatchback and estate bodystyles remain.

== See also ==
- 1993 in motoring – the previous year
- 1995 in motoring – the next year
