= 1979 in motoring =

1979 in motoring deals with developments in the automotive industry that occurred in 1979, listed by country. The automotive industry designs, develops, manufactures, markets, and sells motor vehicles.

== United Kingdom ==
The Ford Cortina MK4 was facelifted and became the MK5, with its three-year-old design receiving a major makeover.

British Leyland updated the Austin Allegro, with the intention of keeping it in production until the launch of an all-new model to replace the Allegro and Maxi around 1982.

Sales began in November of the Opel Kadett, which would also be sold as the Vauxhall Astra from early 1980 - as General Motors entered the growing front-wheel drive hatchback market, replacing the long-running Viva nameplate.

== France ==
Peugeot launched a new large family saloon - the 505 - that would eventually replace the long-running and popular 504. It was a more modern-looking car than its predecessor, though it inherited the boxy styling with which Peugeots had been associated for the last decade. 504 production would continue in Europe until 1983 but would last much longer in Egypt.

Financially troubled American car giant Chrysler sold its European operations to Peugeot, with British Chrysler and French Simcas now wearing Talbot badges.

Renault launched an estate version of its R18 saloon as well as a 5-door version of the R5.

== Italy ==
Lancia withdrew its Montecarlo sporting coupe from production following criticism of its sub-standard braking system. But the big news of the year was the launch of its Delta family hatchback, which was voted European Car of the Year ahead of the Opel Kadett and Peugeot 505.

== Sweden ==
Saab bolstered its range with the launch of the 900, a medium-sized range of three- and five-door hatchbacks which were of a similar size to the Ford Cortina, but offered more in the way of style and refinement. There was also a turbocharged version of the car which was aimed at enthusiasts.

== West Germany ==
Opel launched its new front-wheel drive Kadett in the autumn, in hatchback and estate form. It is also launched a new rear-wheel drive flagship saloon, the Senator.

== See also ==
- 1978 in motoring
- 1980 in motoring
