= 1997 in motoring =

1997 in motoring deals with developments in the automotive industry that occurred in 1997, listed by country. The automotive industry designs, develops, manufactures, markets, and sells motor vehicles.

== United Kingdom ==
A year after launching the Ka city car, Ford produced another car from its Fiesta chassis in the shape of the Puma – a 2+2 compact sports coupe with distinctive styling. Its entry-level 1.4 16-valve Zetec engine was sourced from the Fiesta, but the larger 1.7 unit was seen only in the Puma and was significantly more powerful than the Fiesta-sourced engine.

Vauxhall stopped production of its Calibra coupe range after eight years while the Corsa is given a facelift in the Summer. The Sintra MPV also launches and is based on a GM-design from the US. The model is soon panned for its dull styling, poor build quality and worrying crash-test results which saw it withdrawn after 2 years on sale.

== Italy ==
Alfa Romeo 164 production ceased after 10 years. Its successor was the 166 saloon the following year.

Fiat facelifted the Cinquecento city car after six years on sale and gave it a new name – Seicento. The Seicento was a reworking of its predecessor with curvier detailings, and with the standard 700cc engine being dropped and the continuing 900cc unit being available with "Citymatic" semi-automatic transmission – with a normal manual-style gear-lever but no clutch.

== France ==
Citroën stopped ZX production after seven years to make way for an all-new car – the Xsara. The Xsara was a conventionally styled 5-door hatchback while the coupe offered a 2.0 "VTS" version which was capable of nearly 140 mph. The ZX would continue alongside it for a while an estate version would launch the following year. The end of the year saw a facelifted Xantia launched.

Peugeot gave the 4-year old 306 a major facelift in May while an estate version launched at the same time. An estate version of the larger 406 would launch in July replacing the nearly decade-old 405.

Renault launched a cabriolet version of the Megane.

== Germany ==
The Volkswagen Golf entered its fourth generation with the look of its predecessor, but was an all-new car. The Golf was initially sold as a hatchback only, with estate and cabriolet versions expected in 1998. Entry-level Golfs used 1.4 and 1.6 petrol engines as well as a 1.9 diesel, with more expensive versions including the 1.9 turbo-diesel as well as the four GTI models – 1.8 non-turbo, 1.8 turbo, 2.0 and 2.3 V5. A saloon version – the Bora – replaced the Vento in 1998. UK sales began in Spring 1998.

Audi launched a new generation of the A6, the name first appeared on a facelifted 100 in 1994. It was designed as a direct competitor for the BMW 5 Series. The A6 estate is called "Avant" and launched the following year.

Mercedes-Benz had an all-new model, the A-Class, its first front-wheel drive car in the Autumn with a choice of 1.4 or 1.6 petrol engines with diesels to follow later. It soon gained notoriety for failing an "elk test" where a test model overturned while trying to avoid the elk which forced Mercedes to fit Electronic Stability Control to all versions of it. The new car made Mercedes ownership more affordable than ever before.

== Japan ==
The Honda Accord and the Toyota Corolla were updated for 1998.

Preceded by 1996 in motoring - the previous year	Motoring per year	Succeeded by 1998 in motoring - the next year
