= 1999 in motoring =

1999 in motoring deals with developments in the automotive industry that occurred throughout the year 1999 by various automobile manufacturers, grouped by country.

== United Kingdom ==
The Ford Fiesta supermini received a facelift in October and added the "Zetec S" model that has a 1.6 16-valve Zetec engine while early in the year the Nissan-based Maverick ends production.

The Vauxhall Vectra was updated in April and the automaker also become one of the first manufacturers to sell its cars over the internet. The Sintra MPV is axed and while not a direct replacement in terms of size, a new Astra-based model, the Zafira, would launch in June 1999, offering a flexible interior which allows the seats to be folded flat into the floor and the model would quickly become popular with family buyers.

The Rover 200 Series was facelifted to become the Rover 25. The Rover 400 Series was also facelifted to become the Rover 45. Both models would launch in the autumn. The 75 launched in June replacing both the 600 and 800 Series models.

== Japan ==
The new Toyota Yaris supermini won the European Car of the Year award for 2000 and European sales commenced in April 1999, replacing the long-running Starlet. The Toyota Celica was also redesigned in late 1999 alongside the MR2.

Nissan launches a facelifted Primera in the Summer.

== Italy ==
The Fiat Punto supermini was redesigned offering a 1.9 diesel and the 1.8 HGT hatchback versions as well as a new Fiat logo. The cabriolet version of the previous generation was not carried over to the new model. The Bravo/Brava models received a minor facelift.

== France ==
Citroen entered the compact MPV market with the Citroen Xsara Picasso powered by 1.6 and 1.8 petrol engines as well as a direct injection 2.0 diesel. European sales began in December 1999 while UK sales started in June 2000. A facelifted Saxo range would launch in the Autumn.

Peugeot replaced the 605 executive saloon with the 607 while the 406 receives a facelift in the Spring.

Peugeot also launches the world's first mass production diesel particulate filter system used in the 2.2 HDi unit for the Peugeot 607. This system became mandatory for Euro 5 emission standards in 2009 for all diesel engines sold, in a mass production car.

Renault launches a facelifted Megane range in April 1999 with an estate added to the line-up although not for RHD markets where the Scenic is more popular. The Scenic itself would also get a facelift and the Megane part of the name is dropped.

== Germany ==
Audi added a five-door version to the A3 hatchback range.
