= 2003 in motoring =

2003 in motoring includes developments in the automotive industry that occurred throughout the year 2003 by various automobile manufacturers, grouped by country. The automotive industry designs, develops, manufactures, markets, and sells motor vehicles, and is one of the Earth's most important economic sectors by revenue.

== United Kingdom ==
The Aston Martin DB9 was launched, replacing the nine-year-old DB7.

== France ==
The Peugeot 307 CC was launched after replacing the 306 Cabriolet.

The Peugeot 206 receives a facelift.

== Japan ==
The Mazda RX-8 was the predecessor to the RX-7, it is a 4-door quad coupe. The Nissan 350Z is the replacement of the old 300ZX.
