= 1989 in motoring =

1989 in motoring includes developments in the automotive industry throughout the year 1989 by various automobile manufacturers, grouped by country. The automotive industry designs, develops, manufactures, markets, and sells motor vehicles.

== United Kingdom ==
The new Ford Fiesta used the same floorplan as the original 1976 version, but with a new bodyshell which, for the first time, was available with five doors as well as three. The range included a 1.0 unit and a 1.6 8-valve CVH engine which fit under the bonnet of the XR2i, which had fuel injection. There was also a 1.4 Ghia model,sold only as a 5-door with electric front windows and the option of anti-lock brakes. The Escort received a minor update with a new badge at the rear and some trim revisions and enjoyed its best-ever sales year in the UK with over 180,000 sold.

Rover Group plc launched a new 200 Series in October which unlike the previous four-door saloon car, was a hatchback available with five doors with a three door version to follow later. The Rover 400 Series saloon would launch in April 1990, effectively replacing the saloon version of the previous 200 Series. The 200 Series was powered by a range of new K-Series petrol engines ranging from 1.4 to 2.0 litres. There was also a 1.8 turbo-diesel. The hatchback was marketed as a Ford Escort rival, but the slightly larger saloon was competing against cars such as the Ford Sierra and Vauxhall Cavalier. Following the launch of these new model ranges, Maestro and Montego production was reduced, while a new version of the Metro was planned for sale in 1990. The long-running Mini celebrated its 30th year in production.

Jaguar became part of the Ford Motor Company, five years after being privatised in its sell-off from British Leyland. Updated versions of the Jaguar XJS coupe and convertible were planned.

Vauxhall reentered the coupe market, eight years after the Cavalier Sport Hatch went out of production. The new entrant in this sector was the Calibra, which was based on the front-wheel drive chassis of the latest Cavalier, and used the Cavalier's 2.0 8-valve and 16-valve engines while the MK2 Astra received a minor facelift with the saloon version now called the Astra Belmont.

== France ==
Renault launched its R19 range, a three- and five-door hatchback aimed to compete with cars such as the Ford Escort and Volkswagen Golf. It succeeded the R9 and R11 ranges, and was powered by 1.4 and 1.7 petrol engines as well as a 1.9 diesel.

Peugeot launched the 605 range, a four-door saloon with 2.0 four-cylinder and 2.9 V6 petrol engines as well as a 2.1 turbo-diesel.

Citroen replaced its CX range with the XM featuring self-levelling oleo-pneumatic suspension. Its engines were all sourced from the Peugeot 605, but unlike the Peugeot, the XM was available as an estate as well as a hatchback although it wouldn't launch until 1991 while the CX version continued until then.

== Germany ==
Mercedes-Benz launched a new version of its SL sports car for the first time in 18 years, available with a 3.0 in-line 6 or 5.0 V8 engine.

BMW replaced the 13-year-old 6 Series with the new 850i.

== Italy ==
The Fiat Regata saloon and "Weekend" estate ceased production, and were replaced by the Tipo-based Tempra saloon and "Station Wagon". It was powered by the same 1.6, 1.8 and 2.0 petrol engines which power the Tipo models, but offered a larger boot. The Station Wagon came with the option of seven seats.

Lancia launched a new saloon version of the Delta - the Dedra - to replace the Prisma. It used the same engine and chassis as the hatchback, and was also available with a 2.0 turbo engine from the Delta Integrale.

== Japan ==
Mazda launch the new MX5 two-seater roadster. It offered a style similar to the 1968 Lotus Elan.

Nissan launched a new 200SX 2+2 sports coupe powered by a 2.0 16-valve turbo engine, capable of nearly 140 mph.

== See also ==
- 1988 in motoring
- 1990 in motoring - the next year
