= 1987 in motoring =

1987 in motoring includes developments in the automotive industry throughout the year 1987 by various automobile manufacturers, grouped by country. The automotive industry designs, develops, manufactures, markets, and sells motor vehicles.

== United Kingdom ==
The Rover Group's Leyland Bus division became the independent Leyland Bus company as the result of a management buyout.

Ford released a facelifted version of the Sierra in February, updating the styling and adding a saloon version - the Sierra Sapphire. The 1.3 petrol engine was replaced with a 1.8 petrol engine, while the Peugeot 2.3 diesel was replaced by Ford's own 1.8 diesel.

The old style Sierra was briefly maintained - and the three-door version reintroduced - for a limited run of high performance Sierra Cosworths capable of 150 mph.

The MK2 Fiesta enjoyed its best sales year in the UK with over 150,000 sold.

Jaguar brought out a redesigned version of its XJ Series saloon range, which included a new "Sovereign" version.

== France ==
PSA made two car launches during 1987. The first was the 5-door version of the Citroën AX, a small hatchback based around the running gear of the Peugeot 205. It went on sale across Europe in the Summer replacing the Visa. At the end of the year, PSA launched its Peugeot 405 family saloon, which replaced the long-running 305. With its Pininfarina-styled bodyshell, the new car won the European Car of the Year award by a record margin. The saloon version was assembled at the Ryton plant near Coventry, while the forthcoming estate was to be assembled in France. UK sales began in January 1988.

== Italy ==
In the "Type Four" platform a fourth and final car was launched, the Alfa Romeo 164. Powered by a 3.0 V6 engine, the new four-door saloon was launched in the same sector as the BMW 5 Series and Audi 100. Its Pininfarina-designed body bore a resemblance to Peugeot's new 405, with a redesigned interior. A smaller-engined version was also planned.

== Eastern Europe ==
Three years after it was launched in the USSR, the Lada Samara was imported to Western Europe. With 1.1 and 1.3 engines initially, (a 1.5 version came in 1988), the range included three- and five-door hatchback bodystyles.

== Japan ==
In Japan Honda launch of a redesigned Honda Prelude. The current version debuted in 1983, and the latest version had a VTEC engine.

Toyota brought out the latest version of their Corolla family car.

Mazda launched a new entrant into the mini-car market - the 121. Similar in size to the Ford Fiesta, it offered more headroom and legroom within a redesigned high-roofed body. Three and five-door hatchback bodystyles were on offer.

== South Korea ==
Kia Motors launched the Kia Pride.

== See also ==
- 1986 in motoring - the previous year
- 1988 in motoring - the next year
