= 1988 in motoring =

1988 in motoring includes developments in the automotive industry throughout the year 1988 by various automobile manufacturers, grouped by country. The automotive industry designs, develops, manufactures, markets, and sells motor vehicles.

== United Kingdom ==
The newly independent Leyland Bus company was acquired by Volvo Buses.

The remaining Rover Group business, which by now was mainly volume car production, was sold by the British Government to British Aerospace.

The newly privatised Rover Group plc abandoned the Austin marque for its Mini, Metro, Maestro, and Montego ranges. Each model became badged as a Rover, joining the existing 200 and 800 ranges. The 800 Series gained a fastback model in May, effectively replacing the already discontinued SD1. The MG badge continued for high performance Metro, Maestro and Montego variants, and there was an updated version of the Metro in the pipeline, along with a reintroduction of the Mini Cooper nameplate as the Mini's 30th anniversary approached, with no plans to discontinue the small car nearly a decade after the launch of the Metro which was intended as its replacement. A replacement for the Metro was expected by 1990.

Vauxhall brought out a new Cavalier in October competing with the Ford Sierra and Peugeot 405. Engines ranged from a 1.4 to a 2.0L, with most models getting power steering and electric windows as optional or standard equipment. There was no estate model.

== Germany ==
Volkswagen launched the Passat in March. The Passat was available as a saloon and estate, starting with 1.6 petrol engines as well as a 1.9 turbo-diesel. For the first time in the Passat's 15-year history, there was no hatchback version. Volkswagen's other major launch of 1988 was the Corrado, a coupe which was to replace the Scirocco. It was powered by a 2.0 petrol engine from the Passat saloon.

Audi launched a new Coupe, which ran alongside the original 1980 version. It used the same engines and transmission as the 80 saloon, with the option of Quattro four-wheel drive at the higher end of the range.

== Italy ==
Winner of the year's Car of the Year award was the Fiat Tipo. A replacement for the older Strada, the Tipo was a tall five-door hatchback which offered more interior space for cars in the Ford Escort/Opel Kadett sector. It was powered by 1.4 and 1.6 engines in Britain and most other markets, as well as a 1.7 diesel. The home market also got a 1.1 version, plus the 1.8 and 2.0 versions. A saloon version was expected in 1989 as a replacement for the Strada-based Regata.

== Japan ==
Toyota planned to launch their new Lexus brand. Its new brand would concentrate solely on luxury cars, and the LS 400 went on sale in 1989 to compete with the BMW 7 Series and Mercedes-Benz S-Class, powered by a 4.0 V8 engine.

== See also ==
- 1987 in motoring - the previous year
- 1989 in motoring - the next year
