= 1984 in motoring =

1984 in motoring deals with developments in the automotive industry throughout 1984 by various automobile manufacturers, grouped by country. The automotive industry designs, develops, manufactures, markets, and sells motor vehicles, and is one of the Earth's most important economic sectors by revenue.

== United Kingdom ==
In 1984 British Leyland sold its Jaguar car business into private ownership. British Leyland's mass-market car division, the Austin Rover Group, scrapped one of its longest-running marques, Morris, which was discontinued in August after the Ital was replaced by the new Austin Montego – a saloon version of the previous year's new Maestro hatchback. The new Montego went on sale in April and is powered by 1.3 and 1.6 petrol engines, with more versions set to follow, including high-performance MG variants. October of this year saw the Triumph marque canned, when the Acclaim saloon finished production to be replaced by the Rover 200 Series in June, a four-door saloon which competes in the same sector as the Austin Maestro. Its 1.3 engine is sourced from the Honda Civic, while the 1.6 power unit is supplied from the Austin Rover parts bin. The 200 Series is made at Cowley, where it will soon be joined by the next-generation Honda Ballade. The venture with Honda is set to include a replacement for the Rover SD1, with the new model scheduled for launch in two years' time. The Metro was given a facelift in October and offered a 5-door model for the first time.

Ford had a relatively low profile year in 1984, with the only major changes to the range being the addition of the Escort RS Turbo (powered by a turbocharged XR3i 1.6 engine) and the discontinuation of the unpopular three-door Sierra. A replacement for the Granada range is due next year. Production of the Capri for the European market ended in November but RHD production for the UK would continue for another two years.

Vauxhall scored a huge success in 1984 by launching the second incarnation of the Vauxhall Astra in October. The new model, like its predecessor, is a range of three- and five-door medium-sized hatchbacks and estates. Engines range from a slow but economical 1.2 to a swift 2.0 – the GTE – which can top 120 mph (190 km/h). There is also a fuel-efficient 1.6 diesel. A more powerful version of the GTE is planned for the near future, as are cabriolet and saloon bodystyles. The Astra, which is still sold as the Opel Kadett on the continent, was voted European Car of the Year for the 1985 model year. After nine years on sale and having already been replaced by the Nova in April 1983, the Chevette ends production in January with sales continuing for a while afterwards.

== France ==
The big news for Renault in 1984 was the launch of a new competitor in the Granada/Audi 100 sector – the R25 in March. The smaller-engined petrol and diesel units offered impressive refinement, with more powerful and high-performing variants expected later. The new R25 is officially the most aerodynamic car in the world, giving it excellent ride and handling to match even the most prestigious of its rivals from the likes of BMW and Mercedes-Benz. Renault's other big launch of 1984 is Europe's first MPV, the Espace, originally meant to be launched as a Talbot but became a Renault instead. At launch in July only 9 of them were sold but it eventually became popular with buyers across Europe while UK sales started in August 1985.

The ageing Chrysler-designed Alpine and Solara hatchback and saloon ranges (which were launched nine years ago) were given a mild makeover at the end of 1984 and given new names. Instead of being named by bodystyle, the new versions of this long-running car were badged by trim. The standard models now wear "Minx" nameplates, harking back to one of the Rootes Group's most historic names. The sportier, better-equipped variants are now badged "Rapier" – taking their name from a memorable sports car of the Rootes Group's later years. This is seen as a last-ditch attempt by owners Peugeot to draw customers to these outdated models before any possible replacements are in the pipeline.

== Italy ==
Six years after the launch of the Ritmo/Strada hatchbacks, Fiat finally launched a saloon version. The Regata, as it will be known, is similarly engineered and priced to the hatchback from which it spawned, but is comparable in size to cars in the next highest sector. This makes it exceptionally good value, a unique selling point which is the key factor behind its TV advertising campaign. There is also an estate version of the Regata – the "Weekend" – which is one of the most capacious load carriers of its size.

Production of the Lancia Beta finally ceased after 12 years. Following the launch of newer models like the Delta and Prisma, demand for this once-iconic Italian sedan has gradually slumped and the makers decided that it was time to pull the plug on the production line. In the pipeline for 1985 are new Lancia-badged cars for the supermini and executive car sectors, giving the marque another chance of reestablishing itself in the many markets where it has endured a fall in popularity due to the rust problems of earlier models.

== Germany ==
Opel launched what would be the final generation of the long-running Kadett small-family car range in August with a choice of 3- and 5-door hatchbacks and estates and featured a more aerodynamic design. It would also be sold as the Vauxhall Astra in the UK and as the Daewoo LeMans in Korea from 1986. Both Opel and Vauxhall versions would win the European Car Of The Year award for 1985.

== Eastern Europe ==
Lada finally made a departure from the veteran Fiat 124-based Lada Riva of 1966 vintage. Though the older car was to continue, the new Samara was an engineering achievement after 15 years with virtually no technical changes at Togliatti. The new car, a front-wheel-drive hatchback with a choice of three or five doors, uses a completely fresh mechanical design which includes 1.1, 1.3 and 1.5 petrol engines. Already sold in the USSR, its Western European debut was unlikely to occur for at least another year or two.

== Japan ==
Nissan has made further progress with its range of "Z-Cars". The current Z-Car is the 300ZX, the successor to the less powerful 280ZX. It is powered by a 3.0L V6 engine that allows for top speeds in excess of 130 mph (210 km/h), making it a competitor for the likes of the Toyota Supra and Mazda RX-7.

Honda is achieving sales success in Asia and Europe with the new, latest version of its Prelude coupe. It features a 2.0L 16-valve engine, while the pop-up headlights allow for a more aerodynamic front end which gives way to reduced drag. There is also a 1.8L 12-valve power unit with a carburettor, which lacks the larger-engined version's performance but is more competitively priced.

== See also ==
- 1983 in motoring – the previous year
- 1985 in motoring – the next year
