= 1986 in motoring =

1986 in motoring includes developments in the automotive industry throughout 1986 by various automobile manufacturers, grouped by country. The automotive industry designs, develops, manufactures, markets, and sells motor vehicles.

== United Kingdom ==
BL (formerly British Leyland Limited) was renamed to Rover Group.

The Rover Group's Leyland Trucks division (which included its Freight Rover van business) was merged with the Dutch DAF Trucks company to form the new commercial vehicle company DAF NV. The new company's trucks (built in Leyland, Lancashire, England and Eindhoven, Netherlands) and its vans built in Birmingham, England, were branded as Leyland DAF for the UK market and as DAF for other European and worldwide markets.

The Rover SD1 ceased production after 10 years and was replaced with the Rover 800, which was the third product of the venture with Honda. The Japanese version of this Rover model was the Honda Legend although SD1 sales continues into 1987 and was still popular with the British police force.

Ford gave the Escort major design changes in March, becoming the MK4. The same changes were made to the Orion saloon range, which had a range mirroring the Escort with L and LX models, having originally been sold in GL and Ghia trim only. Ford also ends production of the long-running Capri coupe in December with sales continuing into the following year.

Vauxhall replaced the Carlton with an all-new model after eight years in November but with a rear-wheel drive chassis providing the underpinnings for a four-door saloon and five-door estate aimed directly at the Ford Granada. Engines ranged from a 1.8 to a 3.0 V6 which produced almost 200 bhp. It was European Car of the Year for the 1987 model year. In January, Vauxhall launches a saloon based on the Astra called the Belmont to rival the forthcoming Ford Orion MK2 facelift in March.

== Germany ==
Audi launched a new 80 range to compete with the BMW 3 Series and Mercedes-Benz 190E. The aerodynamic range of four-door saloons were the first cars in their sector to feature a zinc-coated body, aimed at improving resistance to corrosion and rust. The Audi corrosion warranty was also increased from 10 years to 12 years. The engines ranged from a 1.6 75 bhp unit to a 2.0 113 bhp fuel injected model. Five-cylinder versions of the car, with a modified interior, were sold as the Audi 90.

BMW launched a new 7 Series to replace the nine-year-old original version. The 750iL (long-wheelbase) version doubled the cost with higher standards of specification.

== France ==
The 1986 model year saw Renault launch the R21 range, a four-door family saloon competing with the Ford Sierra, Vauxhall Cavalier, Austin Montego and Citroën BX. There was also an American-built version called the Eagle Medallion, with 1.7 and 2.0 petrol engines as well as a 2.0 diesel. There was also a seven-seat estate car version of the R21 - badged Savanna in the UK and Nevada in France, priced slightly higher than the saloon.

In November the Renault group's president Georges Besse was shot dead outside his mansion in Paris by members of militant anarchist organization Action Directe.

Peugeot phased out the Talbot marque on passenger cars, though it was retained for PSA's light commercial vehicle - the Talbot Express. The phasing-out of Talbot began in October 1985 when the Horizon was replaced by the Peugeot 309 – which became the first "French" car to be built in Britain, at the Ryton plant near Coventry. The new model fit between Peugeot's 205 and 505 ranges, and was a direct competitor for the Ford Escort. Most of its power units, and its chassis, were derived from the Horizon. The Minx and Rapier ranges (previously Alpine and Solara) and the Samba were all withdrawn from production. This ended Talbot production in the UK, and by the end of 1986 only the Horizon assembly lines in Finland and Spain retained the marque on passenger cars. They too were terminated in 1987. The Ryton plant hosted production of a new Peugeot-badged car, which was due to be ready for the 1988 model year.

The Citroën GSA ceased production after 16 years, having been effectively replaced by the larger BX four years ago. In October 1986, the launch took place of a new supermini, the AX, based around the running gear of the Peugeot 205. This was also due to spawn a Talbot badged model until Peugeot decided to discontinue the Talbot marque on passenger cars which meant it only launched as a Citroen. It would replace the LNA as well as the Talbot Samba while a 5-door model due the following year would replace the Visa.

A CX replacement was planned for sale before the end of the 1980s.

== Italy ==
The "Type Four" platform's third car was the Fiat Croma, which went into production early 1986. It was a large five-door hatchback similar in size to the Ford Granada, and its underpinnings had been around for the year beneath the Saab 9000 and Lancia Thema. The final car on this platform - an Alfa Romeo model - was planned for sale the following year.

To celebrate its 75th anniversary, Alfa Romeo launched a 75 range to compete with the likes of the BMW 3 Series.

== Spain ==
A year after the launch of the Ibiza hatchback, the saloon version of the car went on sale. Badged the Málaga, it was similar in size to the Ford Orion and Volkswagen Jetta.

== Holland ==
Volvo expanded its range with a coupe, the 480. It was a three-door coupe with a 2+2 seating arrangement, and was designed with American buyers in mind. The car had not been imported to the United States, but it had been imported to Britain. It was Volvo's first front-wheel drive car. Power comes from a 1.7 petrol engine which was also used by Renault and Peugeot. An integral computer was built into the car to control its electrical system.

== Japan ==
Nissan launched a new version of its Sunny family car. The new model is available as a hatchback, estate, saloon or coupe. It had already been on sale for a year in its homeland, and was planned for sale in mainland Europe the following year as the Pulsar. Nissan opened its first European production plant in the Summer in Sunderland in the UK beginning with the Ford Sierra rivalling Bluebird range until 1990 when it was succeeded by the Primera.

== See also ==
- 1985 in motoring - the previous year
- 1987 in motoring - the next year
