= 1985 in motoring =

1985 in motoring deals with developments in the automotive industry throughout the year by various automobile manufacturers, which are grouped by country. This includes the designs, developments, manufactures, markets, and sale of cars.

The first practical automobile with a petrol engine was built by Karl Benz in 1886 in Mannheim, Germany.

== United Kingdom ==
ARG had a fairly quiet year in 1985, with the only significant launch being the addition of an MG variant of the Montego range. The MG Metro 6R4, a mid-engine supercar was introduced for rallies, with four-wheel drive and a V6 engine. The MG version of the Maestro was upgraded from a 1.6 to a 2.0, with the twin Weber carburetors making way for electronic fuel injection.

Ford introduced the third generation of the Granada. The new model which went on sale in May, was a hatchback-only design which brought back memories of the Sierra's launch nearly three years ago. Ford has refused to rule out the possibility of saloon and estate versions at a later date, but the current hatchback is proving popular thanks to its high equipment levels, comfortable interior, solid build and (for a car of the size and level of specification) a competitive asking price. On the continent, the "Scorpio" name covers the whole range, while Britain and Ireland only see the new nameplate as an extra on range-topping 2.8 and 2.9 V6 models, which are known as "Granada Scorpio".

A year after its launch, the Vauxhall Astra hatchback and estate ranges were joined by a saloon. Rather than adopting the same name as used by the hatchback, Vauxhall has been the latest of several manufacturers to follow a new trend of creating a new name for the saloon version which would be known as the "Belmont", while the continental version shares the Kadett name with the rest of the range. The new model would launch in January 1986.

== France ==
Peugeot announced that the Talbot marque would be discontinued on passenger cars the following year and the Horizon replacement launched in October 1985 would instead be sold as the Peugeot 309. A larger family saloon was planned for a 1987 launch, effectively taking over from the outdated Rapier/Minx (formerly Alpine) models and replacing at least some of the 305 or 505 ranges.

Renault launched the second generation of the R5 at the start of the year which offered a more modern appearance and more interior space than its 13-year-old predecessor.

== Italy ==
The recent revival at Lancia was completed with the addition of two new very different cars. The marque's new entry-level model is the Y10 - a three-door compact hatchback which can be seen as an Autobianchi on the continent. Power (though not a great deal of it) comes from a 1.0 FIRE engine which is very economical, and also from a long-running 1.1 unit which was seen more than a decade ago in the Auto bianchi A112 Abarth. This larger unit comes with a turbocharger and pumps out an impressive 76 bhp, making it the far more impressive of the car's two engines.

Also new in the Lancia range is the Thema, a large four-door saloon which is designed to compete with the upmarket likes of the BMW 5 Series. It is designed by Pininfarina and few of its competitors can match it for interior space and comfort. Equipment levels, refinement, ride and handling are good too. It is the first of four cars to be spawned from a new platform which is to be shared between Fiat and General Motors. The second of these cars goes on sale this year - the Saab 9000. The third and fourth cars - from Fiat and Alfa Romeo respectively - are expected to be on sale within two years. The base engine is a 2.0 unit, which is also available with a turbocharger. The range-topper is a 2.8 V6, and there will soon be an exciting Ferrari-engine version which is set to sell in limited numbers.

== Sweden ==
Saab expanded its range with its first competitor in the sector dominated by the BMW 5 Series - the Saab 9000. The new car was a five-door hatchback which shares its underpinnings with the Lancia Thema as well as two forthcoming new big cars from Fiat and Alfa Romeo. With a practical hatchback body style housing a luxury interior, the Saab 9000 had the ability to rival BMW.

== Germany ==
The Mercedes E-Class was a four-door saloon and five-door estate. The whole estate range and some of the saloons have the option of self-leveling suspension, an innovation which was created by Citroen. The range starts with the moderately powerful 2.3 petrol engine, and the top of the range was a 3.2 V6 engine.

Volkswagen launched a 4-wheel drive version of the MK2 Golf called the Golf Country. The company also expanded the already impressive Golf range with a 16-valve version of the GTI. The original 1.8 8-valve GTI was a highly impressive "hot hatchback" which has proved itself even better than the first Golf GTI of 1976, but the new, more powerful GTI is one of the fastest hatchbacks ever produced with a top speed of well over 120 mph. It has the handling, looks and quality to match its high speed, and the Golf is fast becoming one of the fashion icons of the 1980s.

== Spain ==
With SEAT no longer involved with Fiat, the new Ibiza was the Spanish firm's first design not to have been derived from a Fiat. It was penned by world-famous Italian designer Giorgetto Giugiaro, but used the same suspension as the Fiat Strada, and it was the first SEAT to be imported to the UK. Its engines were developed in conjunction with Porsche, and as a result, its advertising campaign features the slogan "Italian styling and German engines". The car's price was significantly lower than that of the similarly sized Ford Fiesta.

== Japan ==
Nissan was in the process of building a new plant at Sunderland in order to cut the cost of exporting cars to Europe. The new factory was set to open in the Summer of next year and would churn out the Bluebird range. There were plans for the entry-level Micra to be built at Sunderland.

Preceded by 1984 in motoring - the previous year	Motoring per year	Succeeded by 1986 in motoring - the next year
