= 1983 in motoring =

1983 in motoring deals with developments in the automotive industry throughout 1983 by various automobile manufacturers, grouped by country. The automotive industry designs, develops, manufactures, markets, and sells motor vehicles, and is one of the Earth's most important economic sectors by revenue.

The first practical automobile with a petrol engine was built by Karl Benz in 1885 in Mannheim, Germany.

1983 saw a great number of new model launches in Europe, with the popularity of the hatchback bodystyle continuing to gather pace and now being the most popular bodystyle in many countries.

== United Kingdom ==
British Leyland has had another busy year. The Austin Allegro had finally ended production after 10 years, following the launch of its successor - the Maestro. The new car is built at the Cowley plant in Oxford, and is sold as a five-door hatchback with an exceptionally spacious interior. It is hardly the best looking car in the world, but features many novel "extras" including a bonded laminated windscreen, body-coloured plastic bumpers, an electronic engine management system and a standard five-speed gearbox - features which are still rare on comparable modern-day family cars. Another novel feature which appeared on the more expensive Vanden Plas & MG versions is a digital instrument panel and a trip-computer which talks and also alerts the driver of any problems although the feature would soon be dropped. Power comes from 1.3 and 1.6 petrol engines, and there is also a more powerful MG version (the MG Maestro 1600) which uses the 1.6 R-Series engine and is capable of 110 mph. Interior space, asking price and running costs are the car's strongest points, and a saloon version is expected next year to give British Leyland an up-to-date rival for the Ford Sierra.

The big news for Vauxhall in 1983 was the introduction of an all-new supermini – the Nova, which replaces the Chevette although that model continued with a reduced range until January 1984. It is built in Zaragoza, Spain and sold on the continent as the Opel Corsa since the autumn of 1982. 1.0, 1.2, 1.3 and 1.4 petrol engines provide power, but these power units are more biased towards fuel economy. The Nova will be sold as a hatchback (three or five doors) and a saloon (two and four doors), an almost unique record number of bodystyles for such a small car. An estate version of the Cavalier launched in October and is based upon the Australian Holden Camira sharing its body panels with a choice of 3 trim-levels.

Ford maintained its position as Britain's most popular brand of car and this was helped by two significant changes to the model line-up. The seven-year-old Fiesta receives a major restyle and becomes the MK2 with the addition of an impressively stylish and fast XR2 "hot hatch" going on sale in late August. In addition to the Fiesta, the company range is expanded with the launch of a brand new 4 door saloon. With the expensive range-topping Granada being Ford's only saloon after the demise of the Cortina, the Orion - as it will be known - is one of the largest cars in its mid-range class with sales starting in September. Its upmarket image is also helped by the inclusion of only GL and Ghia trim levels, although a more basic L version would launch later, with the entry-level 1.1 engine being the only power unit from the Escort on which it is based not to feature in the Orion as well. The Escort receives a minor update including new badging at the rear and the addition of a 5-door estate model.

== Germany ==
General Motors have added a new executive car to the Opel range in the shape of the Senator. Similar in size to the Opel Rekord, the Senator was previously seen in Britain as the Vauxhall Royale, but with that model's demise the Senator will be imported for approximately one year until the Vauxhall-badged version is launched. It is powered by a 3.0 V6 engine and has a spacious, luxurious and comfortable interior. With the Rekord competing against the likes of the Ford Granada, Rover SD1 and Audi 100, the Senator could be Opel's long-awaited answer to the BMW 5 Series.

Volkswagen has called time on the first generation Golf after nine years and an estimated 10,000,000 sales. It has been the world's best selling car of the last decade, a position that has been achieved by solid build quality, cast iron reliability, a smooth ride, strong handling, high levels of practicality and a comfortable interior. The 1.6 GTI kicked off a worldwide demand for "hot hatchbacks" which is getting higher all the time. The MK2 Golf has power units ranging from an economical 1.3 to the impressively fast 1.8 GTI. It carries on all the virtues that made the original Golf such a success. And for traditionalists who prefer saloons over hatchbacks, there is the Jetta – a comfortable four-door saloon which has all the Golf's hallmarks plus the advantage of having the largest boot of any current production car. UK sales started in March 1984.

== Italy ==
The regeneration of Fiat begins with the launch of an all-new supermini, the Uno, a product of Giugiaro's ItalDesign studio. It replaces the veteran 127. Power comes from 900cc, 1.1 and 1.3 petrol engines, with three and five-door hatchback bodystyles making it a practical choice for those who place function above power. It so impressed Europe's motoring press that they voted it European Car of the Year.

Fiat has also given its five-year-old Ritmo/Strada a major facelift which sheds some of the original design's quirks that put so many potential buyers off. The new look is more restrained and gives Fiat hope of continuing already strong sales for its entrant in Europe's most competitive sector.

Alfa Romeo has launched the Arna as part of a joint venture with Japanese manufacturer Nissan. The new range of three and five-door hatchbacks are built in Naples on the same production line as the Nissan Cherry Europe - the first "Japanese" car to be built in Europe. Alfa Romeo customers are suspicious of Nissan handling and Nissan customers even more so of Alfa Romeo build quality. For buyers seeking the traditional Alfa Romeo virtues of flair and fun, the new 33 has gone on sale as successor to the long-running Alfasud and Alfetta ranges. When Fiat acquired Alfa Romeo in 1986, production of the model was swiftly terminated.

== France ==
The hatchback version of the R9 has also arrived – two years after the launch of the saloon upon which it is based. The new Renault 11 is a range of three and five-door hatchbacks which are direct competitors for the new Volkswagen Golf. It uses the same engines and suspension as the R9, but is a shade more practical thanks to it being a hatchback. The new model will also be sold in the US as the Renault Encore, where it will join the R9's American twin – the Alliance – in Renault's bid to gain popularity on the far side of the Atlantic.

The new Peugeot 205 has arrived like a whirlwind. It features a Pininfarina-styled body, and is offered with three or five-door models. It is designed as an eventual replacement for the ageing 104, though that model is still being produced for the home market until 1988. The 205, meanwhile, has a wide range of engines from an economical 954cc unit to a blistering 1.9 powerplant that fits under the bonnet of the range-topping GTI. There is also a smooth and economical 1.8 diesel unit for customers looking for a frugal oil burner.

Citroën has expanded its range in the UK by importing the LNA three-door hatchback which has been sold in its homeland since 1978. However, the model was a slow seller there and couldn't compete with the influx of new superminis that launched during 1983 and was axed after 2 years. There are no plans, however, for the base LN model to be imported across the channel. August 1983 also saw the arrival in the UK of the BX family hatchback which was launched on the continent the previous autumn.

== Japan ==
Nissan has confirmed that the Datsun badge is to be withdrawn from the entire model range after this year and that the Nissan badge will be universal. The first car to wear this badge is the all-new Micra, a small three-door hatchback powered by economical 1.0 and 1.2 petrol engines. It is aimed directly at the likes of the Austin Metro and Ford Fiesta, promising class-leading levels of quality and economy. It is expected to be an eventual replacement for the Cherry, which is slightly larger.

Toyota has announced a new version of its Starlet supermini which will go on sale in early 1984. The new Starlet is one of the last small cars to switch from rear-drive to front-drive, carrying over the previous model's 1.0 and 1.3 petrol engines though dropping the 1.2 unit. It will be the latest of many Japanese challengers to the Fiesta/Metro/Nova dominance of the British supermini market, arriving shortly after another highly competent rival in the shape of Nissan's Micra.

Honda has redesigned its Civic range for the second time in four years. The new model has a longer wheelbase and a wider range, this time including the "Shuttle" high-roof estate model and the "CRX" coupe. Also new to the range is a 1.5 12-valve petrol engine which is also set to debut in the next generation Honda Ballade, which is set to be produced in Britain as the latest product of a Honda-British Leyland venture.

== See also ==
- 1982 in motoring - the previous year
- 1984 in motoring - the next year
