= Fiat Tipo Quattro platform =

Tipo Quattro platform

Overview
- Manufacturer: Fiat Group; Saab Automobile
- Also called: Tipo 4 Type Four
- Production: 1984–1998

Body and chassis
- Class: Executive car platform
- Layout: Transverse Front-engine, front-wheel drive / four-wheel drive
- Vehicles: Alfa Romeo 164; Fiat Croma; Lancia Thema; Saab 9000

Dimensions
- Wheelbase: 2,660–2,672 mm (104.7–105.2 in)

Chronology
- Successor: Type E-platform

The Tipo Quattro platform (type four) was a front wheel drive platform co-developed in the 1980s and 1990s and shared by the Saab 9000, Fiat Croma, Lancia Thema, and Alfa Romeo 164. The platform, ultimately in production for fourteen years, was the fifth and largest of Fiat's Tipo platforms, a numbering sequence that began with zero, hence "four" (the four does not refer to its use by four carmakers).

== History ==
The platform emerged as an agreement between the four carmakers in October 1978 to reduce development costs on new top-of-the-range saloons, although it would be another six to nine years before the cars were launched. It was front-wheel drive, with optional four-wheel drive, and used an all-wheel independent MacPherson strut suspension, except on the Saab.

The Saab and Lancia versions were the first cars to be launched in 1984, with the Fiat debuting a year later, and the line-up being completed in 1987 with the arrival of the Alfa Romeo.

The Fiat and Lancia looked much like the Saab, but the Alfa Romeo only shared the chassis. The wheelbase is 2.67 m (105 inches) on all models. The Saab and Fiat were launched as five-door hatchbacks and the Alfa Romeo and Lancia sold as four-door saloons. Lancia added the only Type Four estate in 1986 and Saab eventually added a saloon version of the 9000 in 1988.

Because of their similarity, numerous parts are interchangeable among brands, e.g., the windshield from the Croma and the 9000; the sideview mirrors of the 9000 and the Thema. To accommodate their shared development, the Saab 9000's ignition key was situated on the steering column instead of between the front seats, as typical on other Saab models. The Alfa Romeo features an exclusive front suspension and chassis modifications. The Saab has a beam axle rear suspension, rather than the independent MacPherson found on the other models. The front end of the Saab varies extensively from the Italian models due to the much improved crash protection.

The Thema was the first of the Type Four models to be replaced when it was succeeded by the Kappa in 1994 – which made use of a new Type E-platform which also spawned the 164's successor, the Alfa Romeo 166, in 1996. Fiat stopped manufacturing the Croma in 1996 without an immediate replacement. The 9000 was replaced in 1997 by the 1998 9-5, based on the Opel-derived GM2900 platform also shared with its 900 and 9-3 siblings. The Alfa Romeo 164 was replaced by the 166 in 1998, signalling the end of the Type Four platform after 14 years.

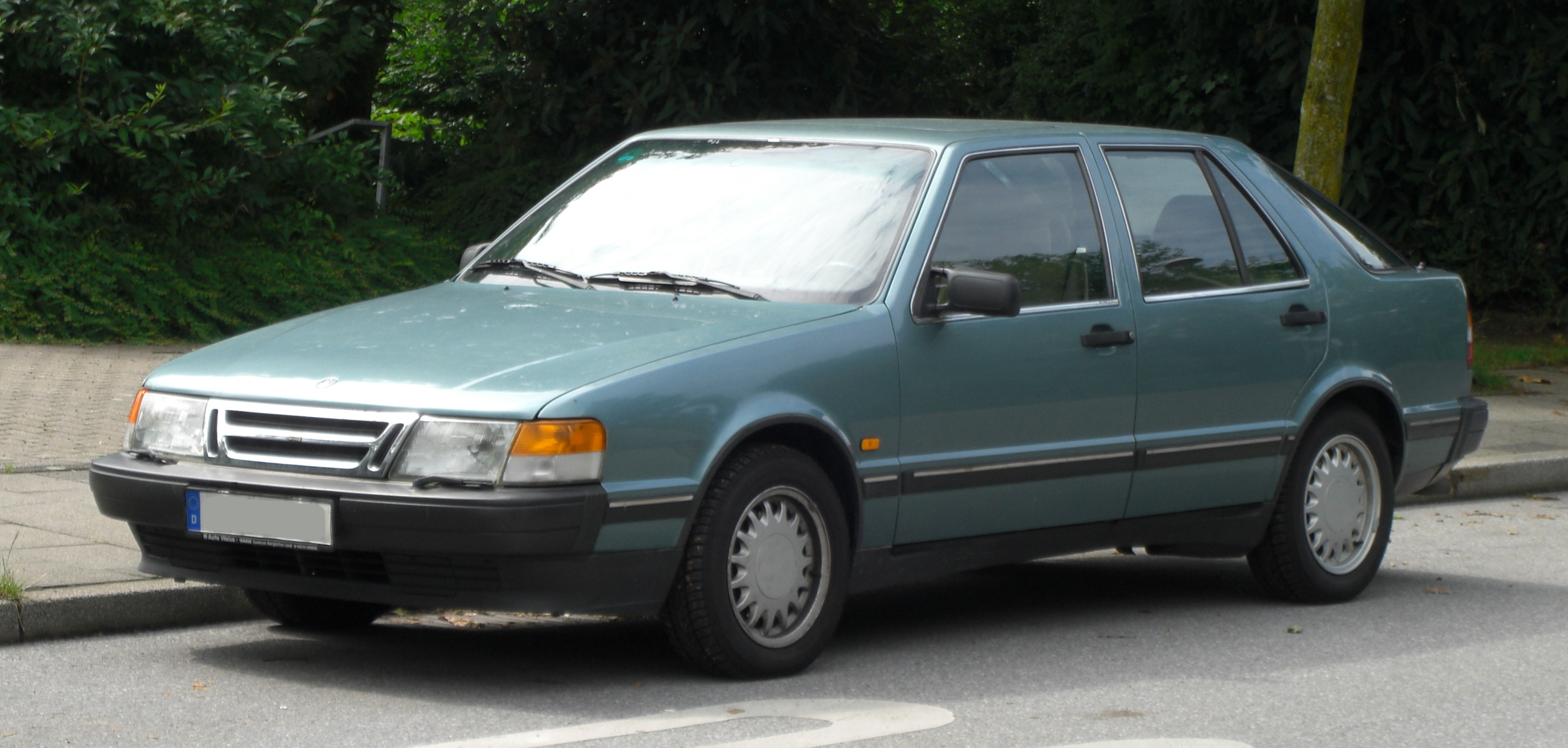
Saab 9000 (1984-1998)

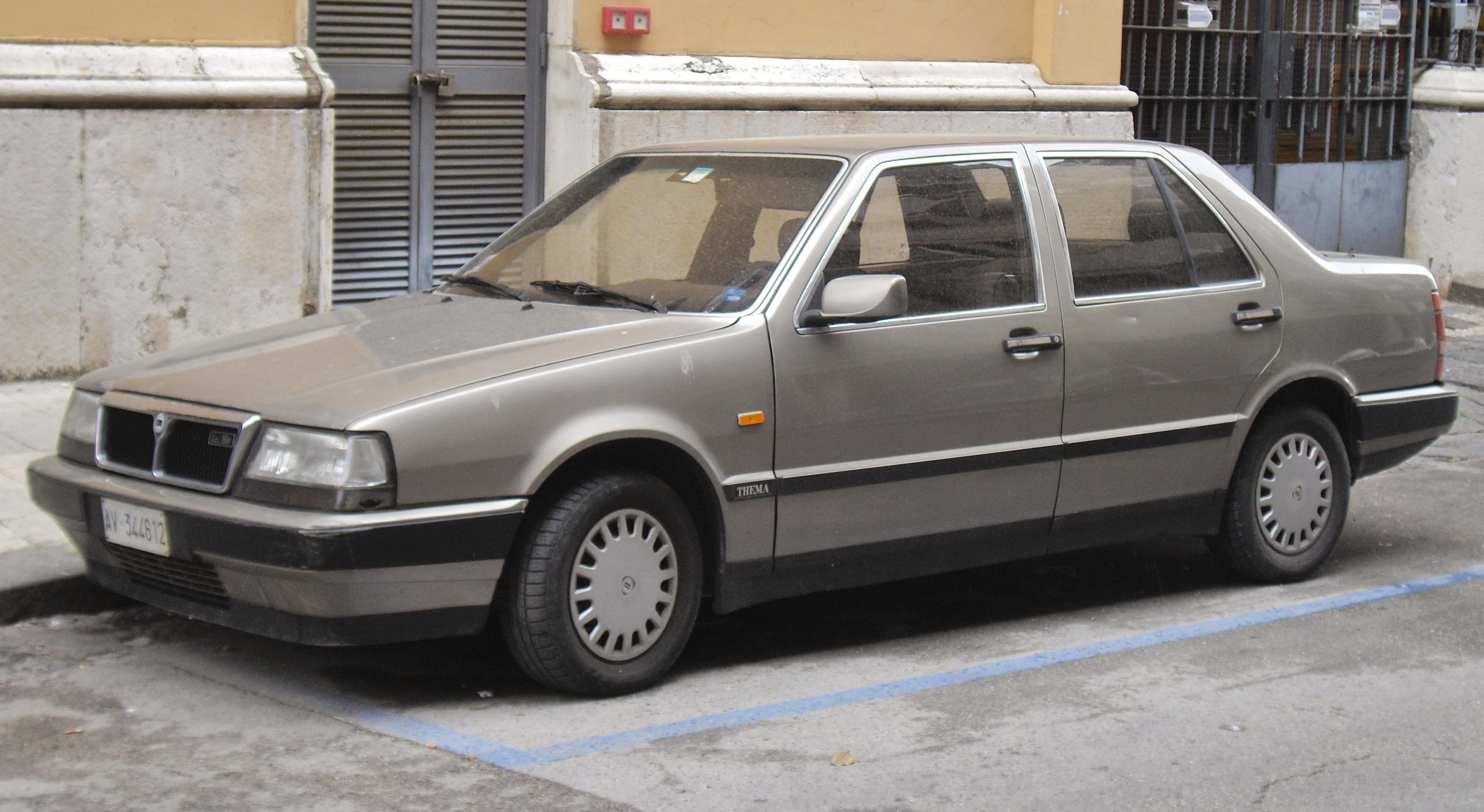
Lancia Thema (1984-1994)

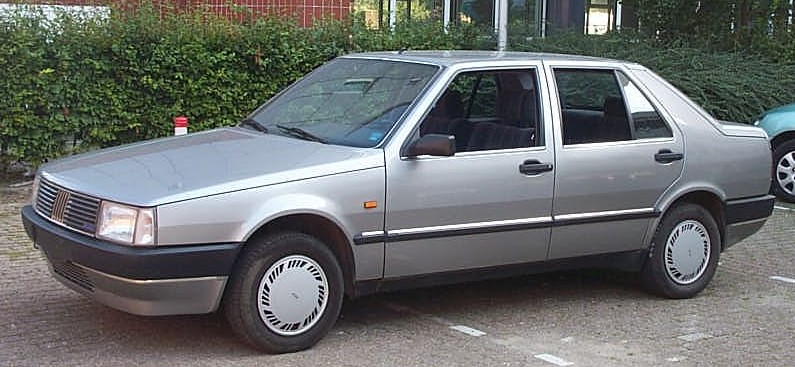
Fiat Croma (1985-1996)

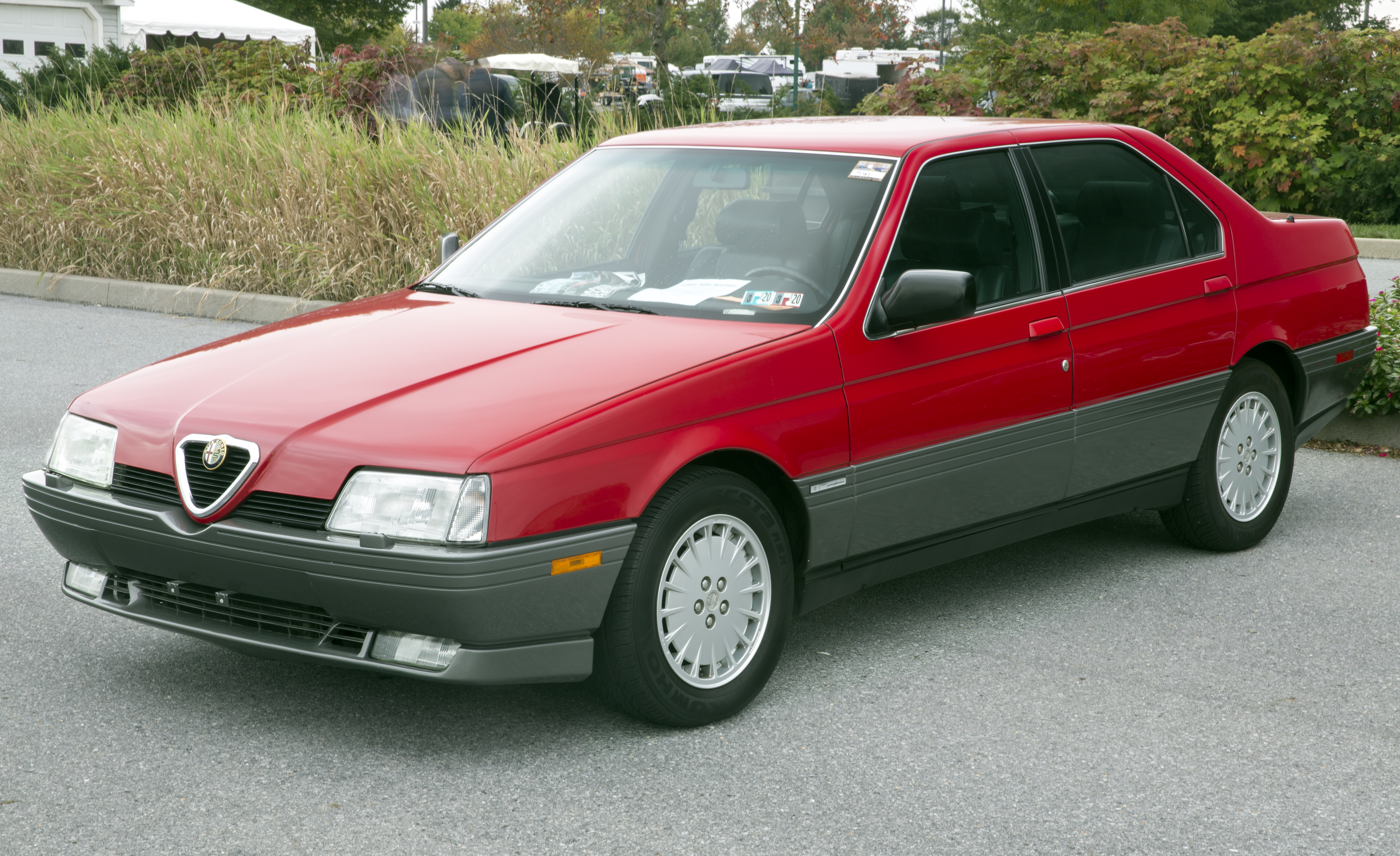
Alfa Romeo 164 (1987-1998)

== In popular culture ==
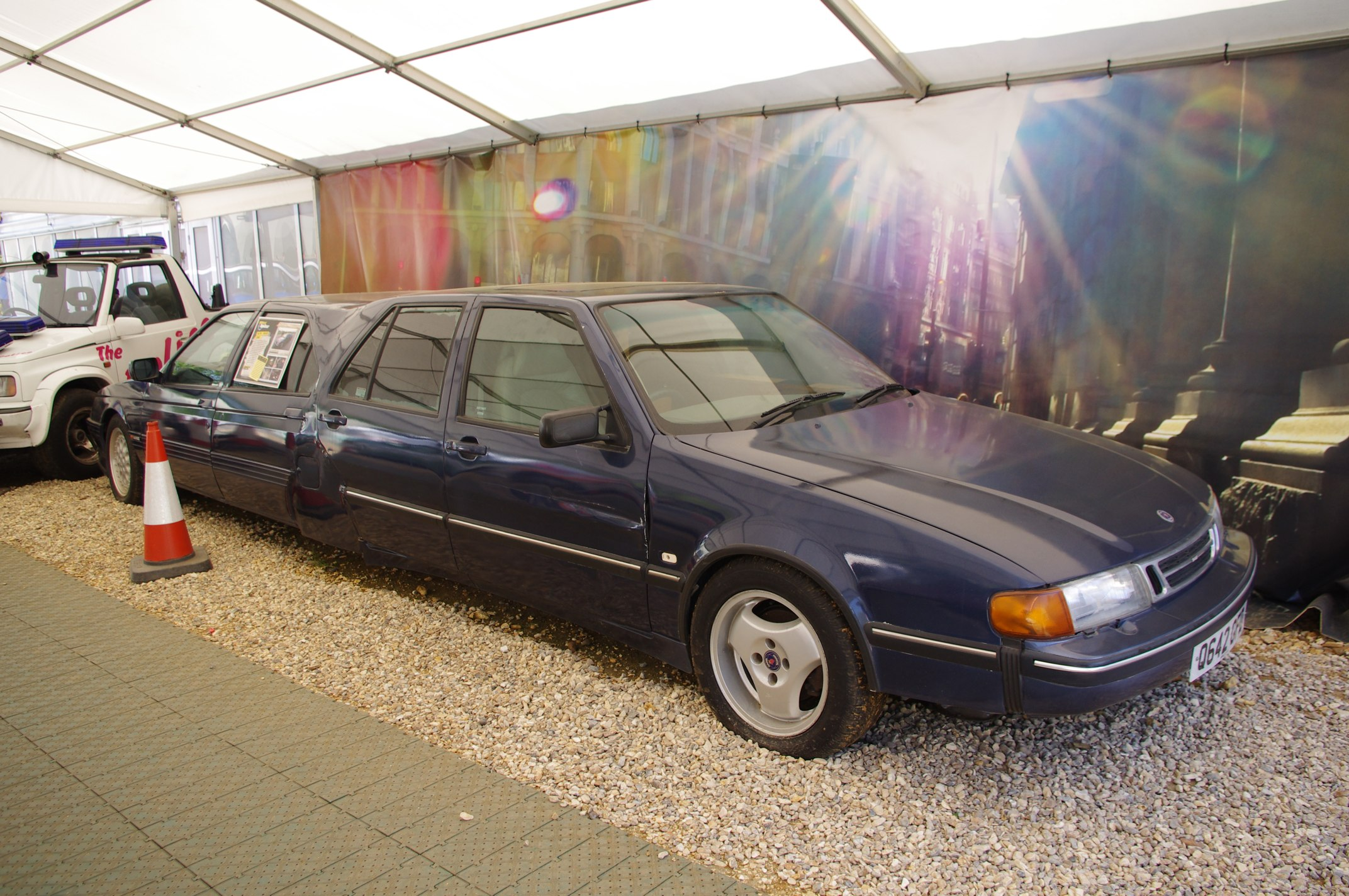
James May's Top Gear Salfa Romeaab

On the 6th episode in the 9th season of the British motoring program Top Gear, James May welded together the front halves of a Saab 9000 and Alfa Romeo 164 to make a stretch limousine. He said the two cars should be entirely compatible because they had the same wheelbase and floor pan. It was nicknamed the "Salfa Romeaab".

The Hagerty YouTube channel produced Episode 40 of its REVelations documentary series on the Fiat Tipo Quattro cars, titled "When The World's Fastest FWD Sport Sedans Were Secretly The Same Car" and featured footage of the Lancia, Saab and Alfa models. This episode, like all others in the series, was hosted by Jason Cammisa.
