= 1982 in motoring =

1982 in motoring includes developments in the automotive industry throughout 1982 by various automobile manufacturers, grouped by country.

== United Kingdom ==
British Leyland announced the new Austin Ambassador. The Ambassador was a heavily reworked version of the Princess, with a hatchback bodystyle.

British Leyland also revived the MG marque, a year after the last MGB had been sold. The MG Metro 1300 was a sporty version of the standard Austin hatchback with a 1.3L petrol engine which was capable of 100 mph (160 km/h). British Leyland also expanded the Metro range with the introduction of a luxury Vanden Plas version.

In the same year, British Leyland sold the Coventry Climax forklift truck and specialist engines business into private ownership.

The end of 1982 also saw the end of Austin Allegro production after a decade. It was replaced by the Maestro, which did not go on sale until March 1983.

After 20 years on sale, during most of which it was the best-selling car in Britain, the Ford Cortina ceased production. Its successor was the aerodynamic Sierra, a range of hatchbacks and estates. A saloon called the Sapphire would launch in early 1987. Underneath, the Sierra differed little from its predecessor. 1.3, 1.6, 2.0 and 2.3 petrol engines were carried over from the Cortina although the car rode on a new rear-wheel-drive platform with independent rear suspension. There was the added option of a 2.3L diesel unit sourced from Peugeot and a 5-speed gearbox became available. The Sierra divided opinion at launch over its space-age styling which also became known as the "jellymould". However, Ford dealers still had high stocks of the Cortina to shift and sales of the model continued into 1983 but the Sierra still managed second place in the UK's top-selling new cars for that year.

== France ==
Renault withdrew the R14 hatchback from production after six years, with a Renault 9–based model due to replace it in 1983.

Citroën introduced a new medium-sized hatchback range which replaced the long-running GS: the BX. It was aimed directly at the new Ford Sierra, and was designed to include plastic body panels which were designed to reduce corrosion and improve fuel economy. The engine range started with a 1.1-litre petrol unit, which was unusual in this size of car and was only to be sold in certain European markets. The BX range's top engines were 1.9 petrol and 1.9 diesel units (turbo and non-turbo). It was launched on the continent in September 1982, but British sales did not begin until the following summer. An estate version would follow later.

== Germany ==
Audi launched the 100, a saloon with an aerodynamic bodyshell. The four-door saloon (no longer with a two-door variant) was joined by the five-door Avant estate car. Equipment levels on the 200 had specification levels comparable to the BMW 7 Series.

BMW launched the 3 Series, a new range of two- and four-door saloons aimed to compete with the Audi 80. The 316 was a 1.8-engined model, and the 323i was capable of around 130 mph (210 km/h).

The new 5 Series, is a large saloon aimed at competing with the Audi 100.

Volkswagen launched a heavily restyled Scirocco, though it maintains the original front-wheel-drive chassis of the original 1974 MK1 Golf–based model. The mechanical design and engines are very much the same as before, but the new bodyshell is substantially different.

Mercedes-Benz has finally made its cars affordable for the mass production market by introducing the new 190E in December – which is a direct competitor for the BMW 3 Series. It is an all-new four-door saloon with rear-wheel drive, with the entry-level model being the 2.0 carburetor engine which produces 105 bhp. Like the larger, more expensive models in the Mercedes range, the 190E is a well-equipped, comfortable, solid, reliable, refined and prestigious competitor which is difficult to beat in almost every area. UK sales commenced in September 1983.

== Italy ==
Fiat made changes to the 132 range which was renamed Argenta.

Lancia launched the Prisma, a four-door family saloon. Based on the chassis of the Delta and Fiat Ritmo hatchbacks, it is nearer in size to cars in the Ford Sierra and Opel Ascona (Vauxhall Cavalier) sector. It uses the same mechanical design and engines as the Delta.

== Spain ==
In September, the Opel Corsa was launched, a small front-wheel-drive hatchback or saloon. General Motors announced its intention to import the car from Spain to Britain from April 1983 as a Vauxhall, where it would eventually replace the Chevette.

== Japan ==
Nissan announced a front-wheel drive model in its Sunny range. The model was badged as a Datsun in Europe, and as the Nissan Sentra in America. A new small model in the Nissan range was planned to go on sale the following year. The Cherry was repositioned as a hatchback in the mould of the Volkswagen Golf, with 1982 seeing the Cherry's position in the supermini market filled by the Micra (sold as the March in certain markets, including its home country of Japan), although the Micra will not be available to European buyers until the summer of 1983. Nissan also responded to the growing demand for front-wheel drive hatchbacks with its new Stanza, which was launched in Europe from January 1982 after going on sale in Japan towards the end of 1981.

Daihatsu announced the Charmant, a four-door saloon based on the then current Toyota Corolla. It was sold alongside the compact Charade, which competed with the likes of the Austin Metro and Ford Fiesta.

== Poland ==
1982 saw the Polski Fiat badge removed from the long-running Fiat 125–based saloons, which were now badged in all markets as FSO.

== See also ==
- 1981 in motoring - the previous year
- 1983 in motoring - the next year
