= Lancia Thema =

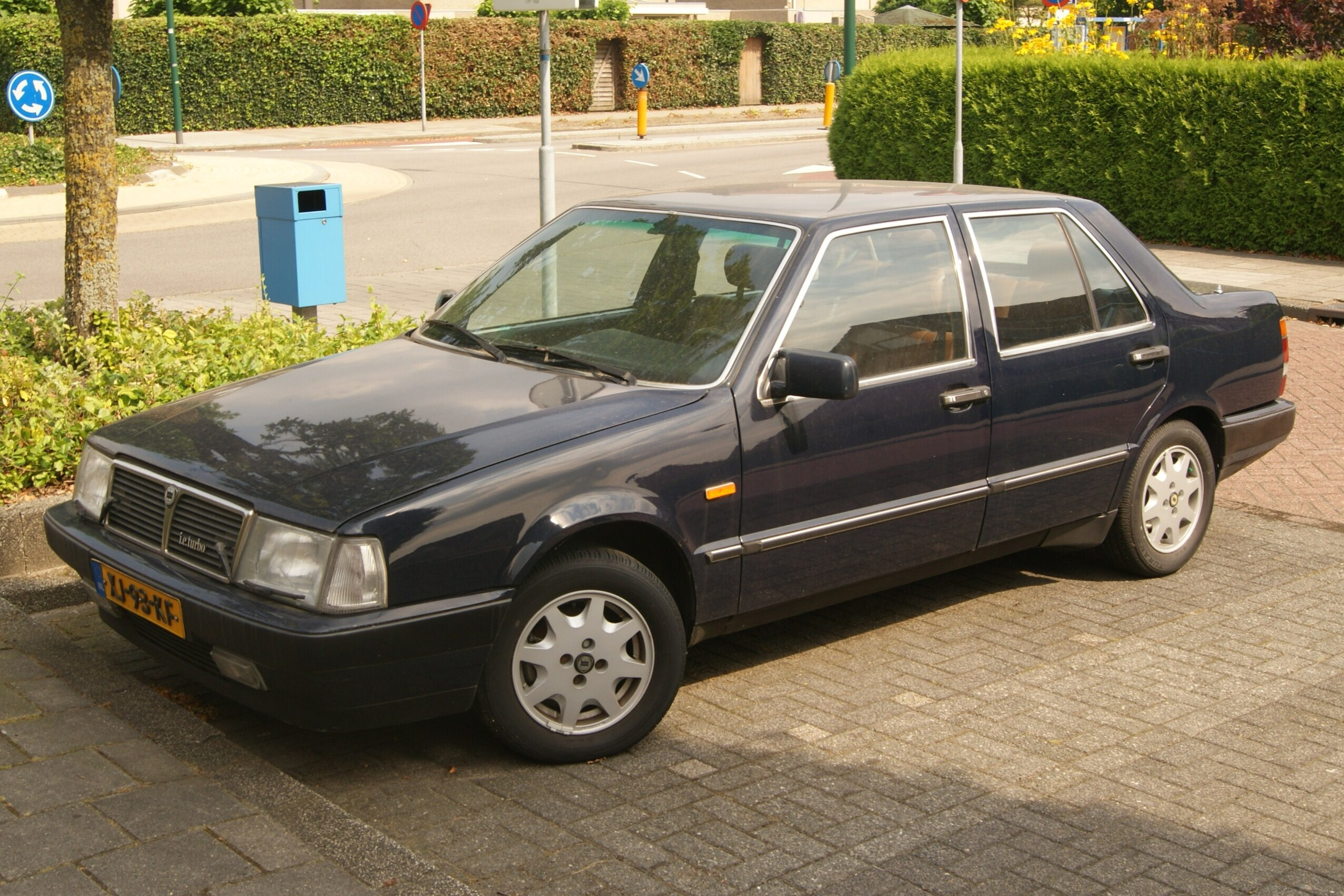
- First generation Lancia Thema (pre-facelift)

Overview
- Manufacturer: Lancia (Note: Fiat Auto (1984–1994); Chrysler Group LLC (2011–2014))
- Production: 1984–1994; 2011–2014

Body and chassis
- Class: Executive car (E)
- Layout: Front-engine, front-wheel-drive (first generation); Front-engine, rear-wheel-drive (second generation)

The Lancia Thema (Type 834) is an executive car produced by the Italian automaker Lancia between 1984 and 1994, and one of four cars to share the Type Four platform alongside the Alfa Romeo 164, Fiat Croma and Saab 9000. The Thema was first shown at the Turin Motor Show in 1984. The Thema was available as a saloon and as a station wagon. The station wagon was designed and produced by Pininfarina.

In February 2011, it was reported that the second generation of the Chrysler 300C, due for launch later that year, would be marketed as Lancia Thema in all European markets, except the UK and Ireland, which would retain the 300C nameplate. It was sold from 2011 to 2014.

== First generation (1984–1994) ==
Lancia Thema
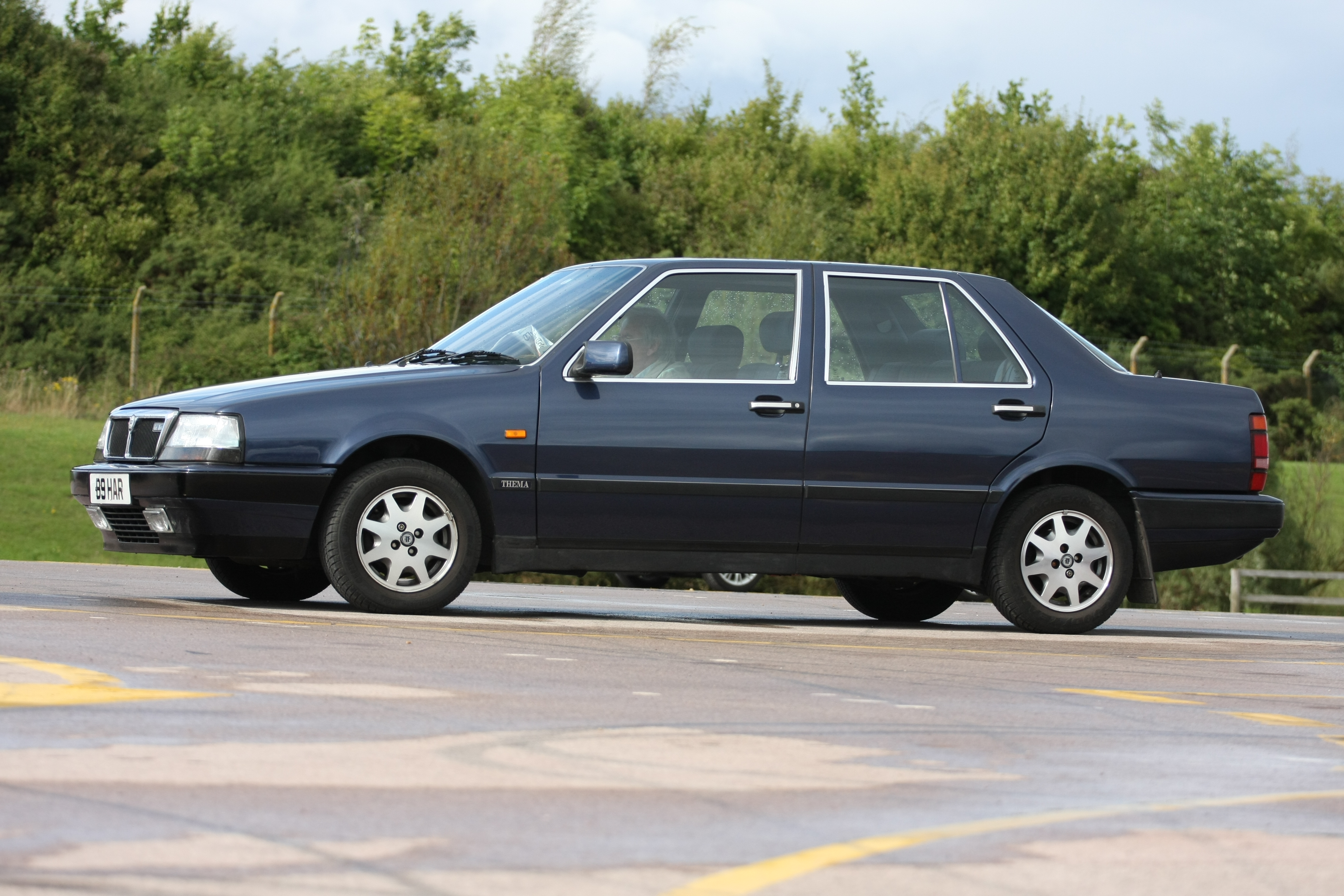

Overview
- Manufacturer: Fiat Auto (1984–1986); Alfa-Lancia Industriale (1987–1991); Fiat Auto (1991–1994)
- Production: 1984–1994
- Assembly: Italy: Mirafiori plant, Turin; Borgo San Paolo plant, Turin; Grugliasco, Turin (Pininfarina)
- Designer: Giorgetto Giugiaro at Italdesign (saloon); Pininfarina (station wagon)

Body and chassis
- Class: Executive car (E)
- Body style: 4-door saloon; 5-door station wagon
- Layout: Front-engine, front-wheel-drive
- Platform: Fiat Tipo Quattro
- Related: Saab 9000; Alfa Romeo 164; Fiat Croma

Powertrain
- Engine: Petrol: 2.0 L Fiat 834B I4; 2.0 L Fiat 834C.146 turbo I4; 2.8 L PRV V6; 3.0 L Alfa Romeo V6; 2.9 L Ferrari Tipo F105L V8; Diesel: 2.4 L Sofim 8144.91 turbo-diesel I4; 2.5 L Sofim 8144.97 turbo-diesel I4
- Transmission: 5-speed manual; 4-speed ZF 4HP automatic

Dimensions
- Wheelbase: 2,660 mm (104.7 in)
- Length: 4,590 mm (180.7 in)
- Width: 1,755 mm (69.1 in)
- Height: 1,440 mm (56.7 in)
- Kerb weight: 1,150–1,300 kg (2,535.3–2,866.0 lb)

Chronology
- Predecessor: Lancia Gamma
- Successor: Lancia Kappa

=== First series ===
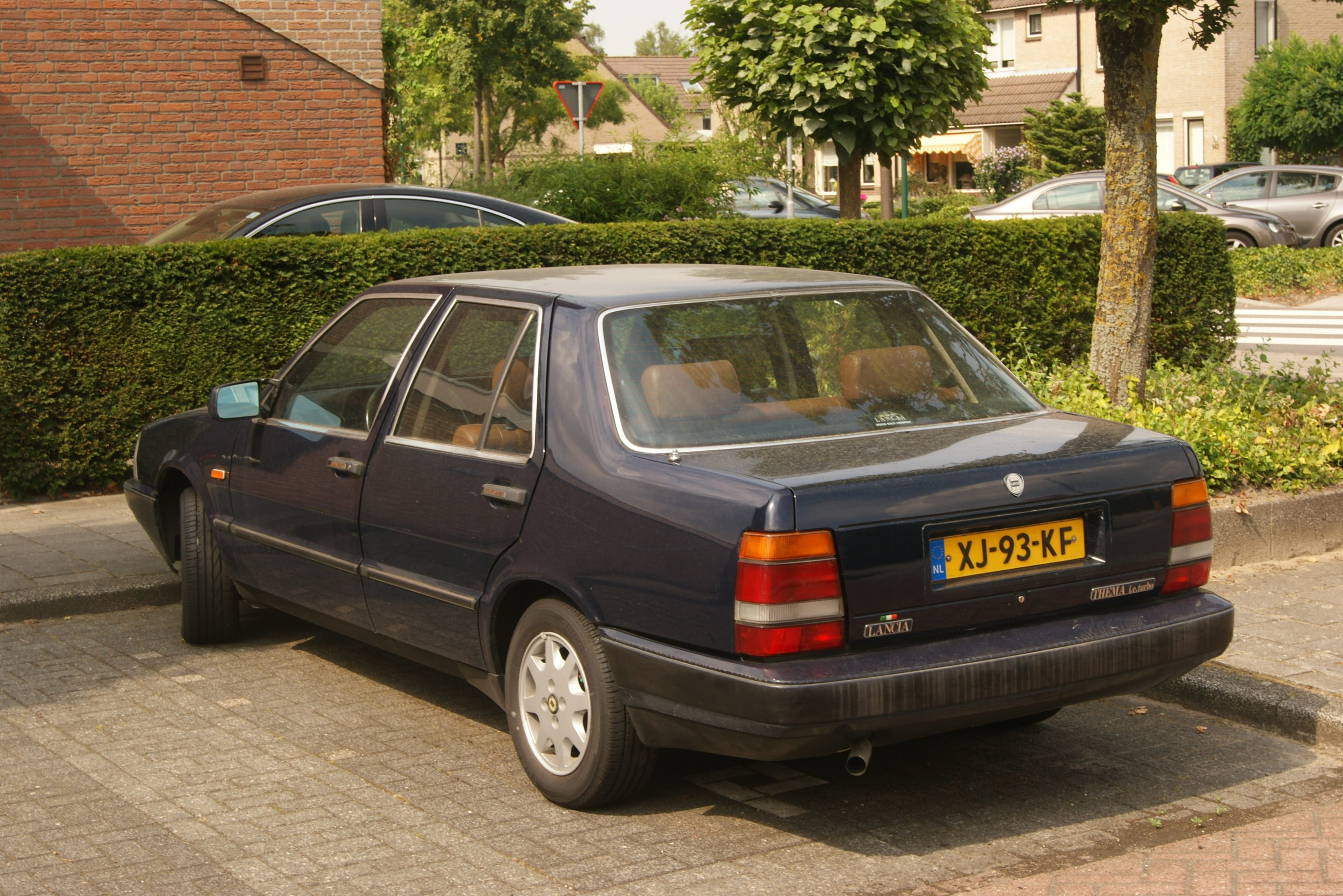
A first series Thema i.e. turbo

The Lancia Thema was announced in May 1984, then introduced to the motoring press with an event held in October 1984 in Vienna, and to the general public at the Turin Motor Show in November of the same year.

The first series of the Thema was built between 1984 and 1988, with four different models initially available. Two came with a twin cam 8-valve, fuel injected 1,995 cc (2.0 L) 4-cylinder petrol engine, in naturally aspirated guise on the Thema i.e. or turbocharged and intercooled on the Thema i.e. turbo. Power output was 120 PS (88 kW; 118 hp) and 165 PS (121 kW; 163 hp) respectively. The most expensive model was the Thema 6V, powered by a 150 PS (110 kW; 148 hp), 2,849 cc (2.8 L) V6, tuned for smoothness. On most European markets a 2,445 cc (2.4 L), 100 PS (74 kW; 99 hp) four-cylinder turbocharged and intercooled four-cylinder diesel engine was also available, on the Thema turbo ds. 1986 saw the introduction of the Pininfarina-designed Thema Station Wagon, available with the two turbocharged engine options only, and of the Ferrari V8-engined Thema 8·32.

=== Second series ===
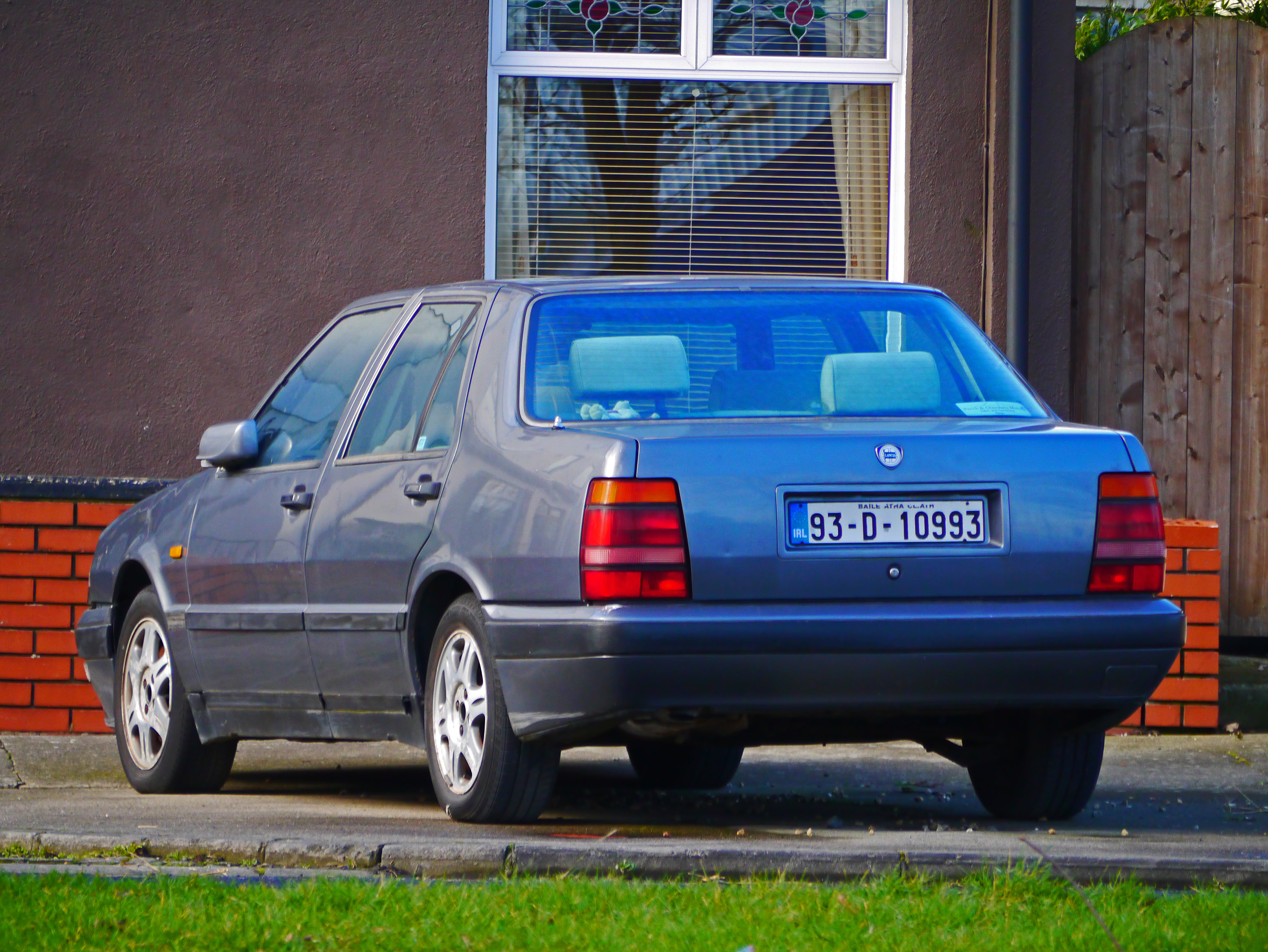
Lancia Thema i.e. turbo (post-facelift)

The second series of the Thema was presented in the Paris Motor Show in September 1988. New 16-valve 2.0-litre engines replaced the previous 8-valve units, increasing the power output to 147 PS (108 kW; 145 hp) on the naturally aspirated Thema i.e. 16v and to 185 PS (136 kW; 182 hp) on the Thema turbo 16v. The 8-valve 2-litre, now producing 117 PS (86 kW; 115 hp), remained on sale on the Thema i.e. base model. The 147 PS (108 kW; 145 hp) six-cylinder on the Thema V6 was only mildly revised. The diesel engine on the Thema turbo ds increased marginally in capacity, to 2,499 cc (2.5 L), and more significantly in output, to 118 PS (87 kW; 116 hp).

A number of small visual updates were made to freshen the Thema's look. Upfront there was a more prominent grille with vertical instead of horizontal bars, and the turn indicators had been moved beneath the main headlamp units, under horizontal dark-tinted lenses. At the rear all model badging was removed, and the turn signals and backup lamp lenses were now tinted red. Finally, the side rubbing strips, side skirts, wheel covers and 8-spoke alloy wheels were redesigned. The station wagon and the 8·32 received similar updates. With five engines available on the saloon, three on the SW (the two 16-valve petrols and the turbo diesel), the Thema range consisted of nine different models. The different models received almost no visual distinctions, aside from the 8·32. Other models looked largely identical aside from badging, wheel dimensions, and wheel design (along with body-coloured mirror housings on top versions). Additionally the 4- and 6-cylinder petrol engines were also produced in catalytic converter-equipped versions, with slightly reduced output, for sale on markets where such equipment was mandatory.

=== Third series ===
The series two was then replaced by the facelifted third and last series, introduced at the Paris Motor Show in September 1992 and produced from 1992 to 1994. Four trim levels—base, LE, LS and LX—were introduced across the range; the 2.9-litre V6 engine was replaced by a more powerful 175 PS (129 kW; 173 hp) 3.0-litre unit, sourced from Alfa Romeo.

Production of the Thema ceased in 1994, when Lancia also withdrew entirely from RHD markets (including the United Kingdom) in response to falling sales. The Thema was replaced by the Kappa. A total of over 336,000 Thema saloons were produced.

=== Variants ===
==== Station wagon ====
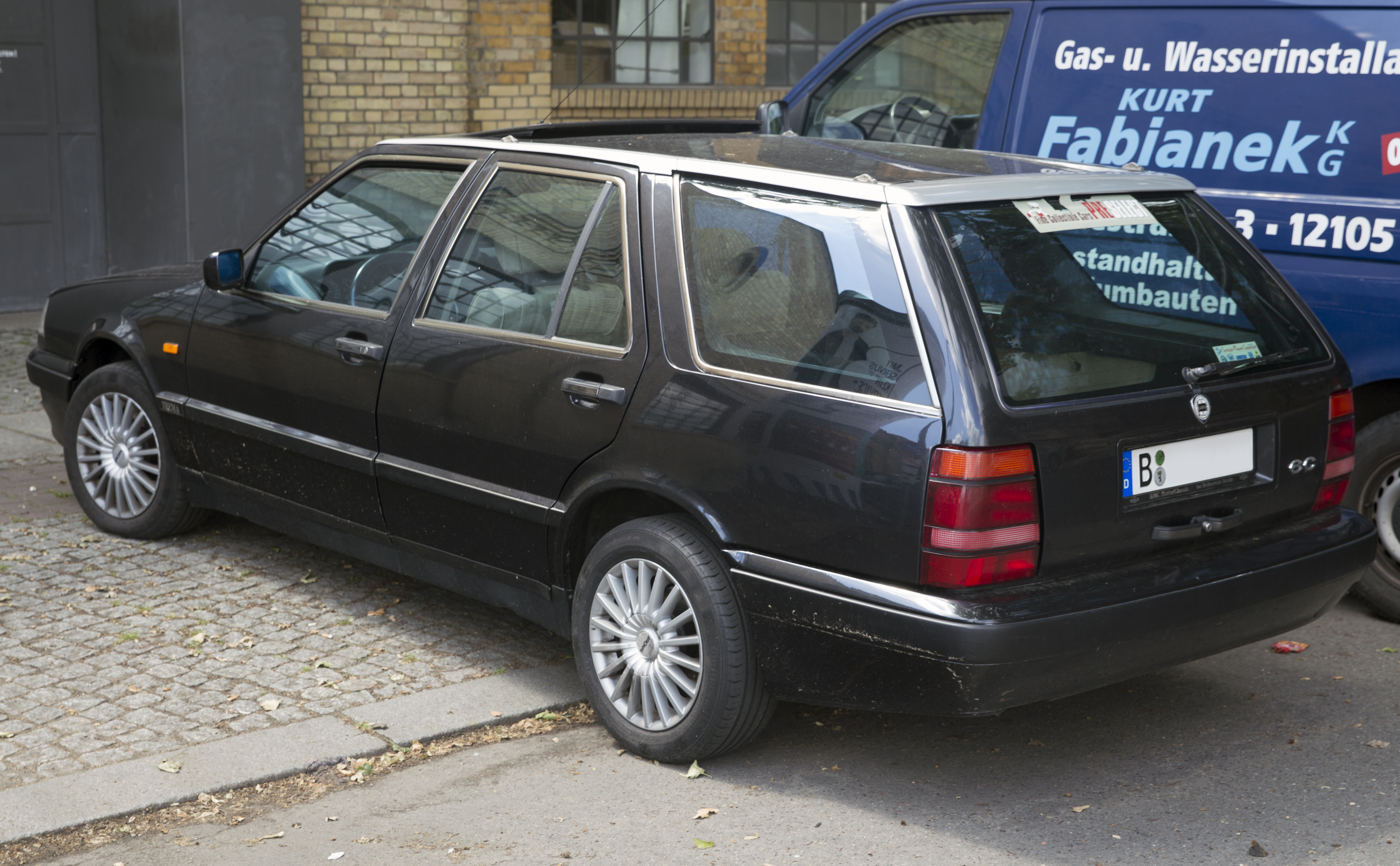
A second series Thema station wagon

In addition to the saloon, a station wagon was jointly developed and produced by Lancia and Pininfarina in Grugliasco. It was shown in prototype form at the September 1985 Frankfurt Motor Show, and in definitive form at the March 1986 Geneva Motor Show. Zagato had also shown a station wagon proposal earlier, at the 1985 Geneva Motor Show. This prototype, which remained a design study, with a larger glass area in the rear and with more discreet D-pillars than for the Pininfarina variant.

Pininfarina was also tasked with producing the new bodystyle. The Lancia factory assembled all the body-in-white parts shared with the saloon; the incomplete bodies were sent to Pininfarina, where they were completed and painted, and final assembly was carried out. The station wagon version was never offered in a right-hand drive variant. In total 21,074 Thema station wagons would be built by Pininfarina between 1986 and 1994 in their Borgo San Paolo plant.

==== Thema 8·32 ====
First shown at the Turin Auto Show in 1986, the Lancia Thema 8·32 ("8" standing for the number of cylinders and "32" for the number of valves) was assembled at Lancia's S. Paolo plant in Turin. It used a 2,927 cc (2.9 L), Tipo F105L, Ferrari V8. This engine was based on the unit used in the Ferrari 308 GTB and in the Ferrari Mondial Quattrovalvole, and some of the components were assembled by Ducati from castings made at Maranello. The engine differed from other Ferrari V8s of the time in that it was equipped with a cross-plane type crankshaft rather than the usual flat-plane crankshaft, smaller valves and a different firing order: all this was to make the engine's characteristics more suitable for a four-door luxury saloon. In non-catalysed form the engine produced 215 PS (158 kW) at 6,750 rpm, and the car was capable of accelerating from 0–100 km/h (62 mph) in 6.8 seconds and could reach a top speed of 240 km/h (149 mph). Catalysed versions produce 205 PS (151 kW), which allowed for 0–100 km/h acceleration in 7.2 seconds and a top speed of 235 km/h (146 mph). The transmission was a 5-speed manual transmission; there was no automatic option. The braking system used larger 294 mm vented front discs and the standard 251 mm rear ones from the other Thema variants.

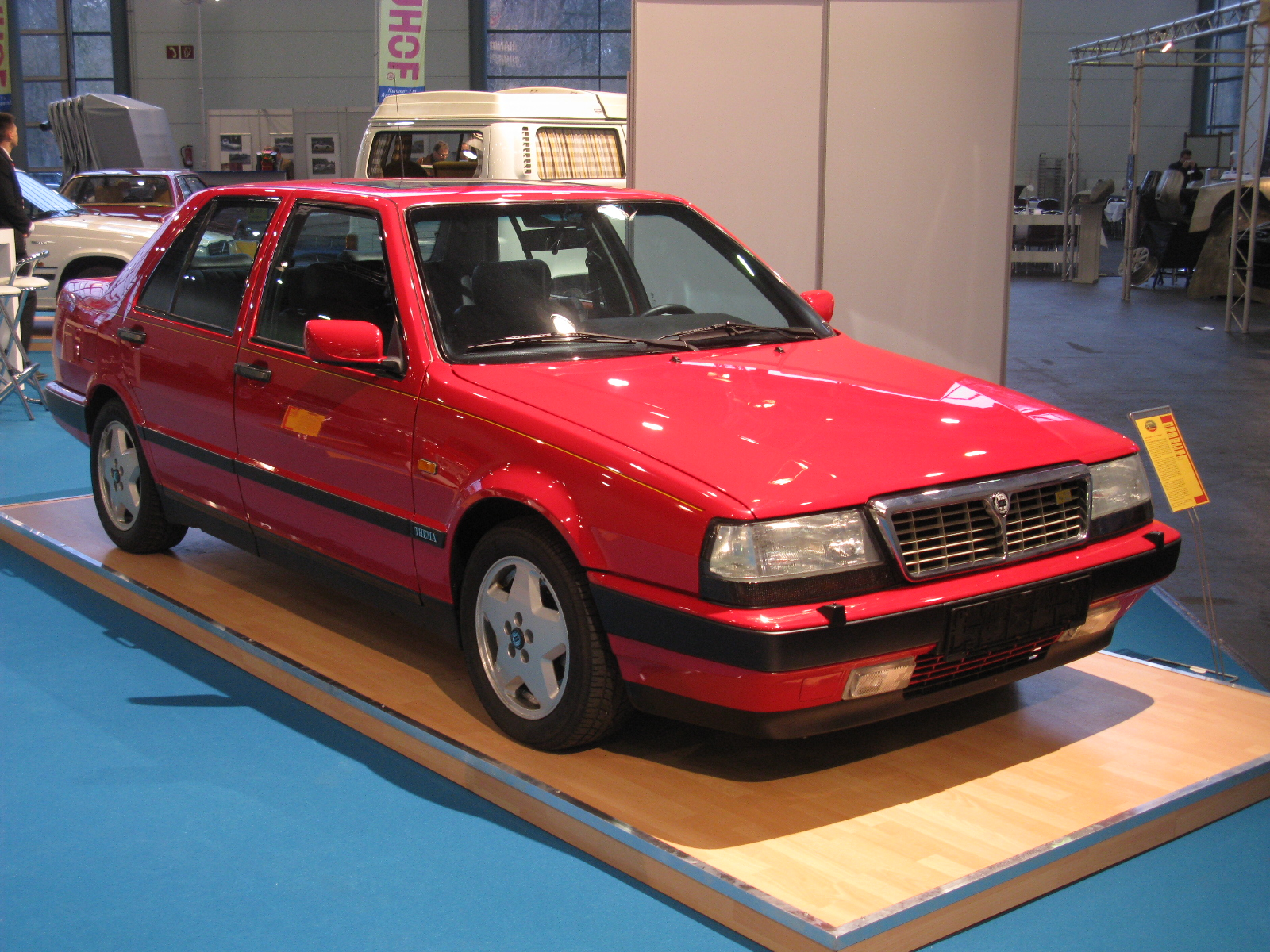
A second series Lancia Thema 8·32

All 8·32s featured Bosch KE3 Jetronic fuel injection, ABS, ZF's brand new Servotronic electronically controlled rack-and-pinion power steering (which varied steering wheel effort according to vehicle speed), and a retractable rear spoiler. The latter, designed to increase high speed stability, was controlled by the driver via a rotary switch on the right stalk. In closed position, it would fit flush with the boot lid. The tyres were specially developed 205/55 VR15 Goodyears on five-spoke 6J×15 alloy wheels.

The car offered a handmade wood-and-Alcantara (or optional Poltrona Frau leather) interior, and was complete with luxury equipment similar to the LX trim level of the Thema. Stitched leather covered the entire dashboard, the steering wheel (including centre), gear and handbrake levers and booths, centre console, door panels and sun visors, while the headlining was done in Alcantara. A bespoke dashboard fascia housed two main instruments, six small auxiliary gauges, and triple round air conditioning vents. Like the door cappings and the lids concealing the radio and ashtray, it was veneered in matte varnish burr wood. The instrumentation had black dials with yellow hands and markings; it included water thermometer, oil thermometer and pressure gauge, and check panels for the lights and the drivetrain. The seats (and matching door panel inserts) were trimmed in beige or date brown Alcantara as standard, with black or brown leather was an optional extra. Brown interiors got colour-matching switchgear, carpets and trim. Irrespective of interior selection, Thema 8·32 buyers could choose from five paint colours, all metallic finishes: Blizzard Blue, Winner Red, Quartz Grey, Reflex Green and Black. A double hand-painted pinstripe (the upper matched to body colour, the lower yellow) ran along the sides and the rear of the car. Besides the paint scheme, retractable spoiler and wheels, the only exterior details setting the 8·32 apart from other Themas were yellow "8·32" badges, a silver eggcrate-type grille, and twin exhaust outlets. Some notable options were automatic climate control, electrically actuated sunroof, provision for a car phone in the front armrest, and rear individual power seats.

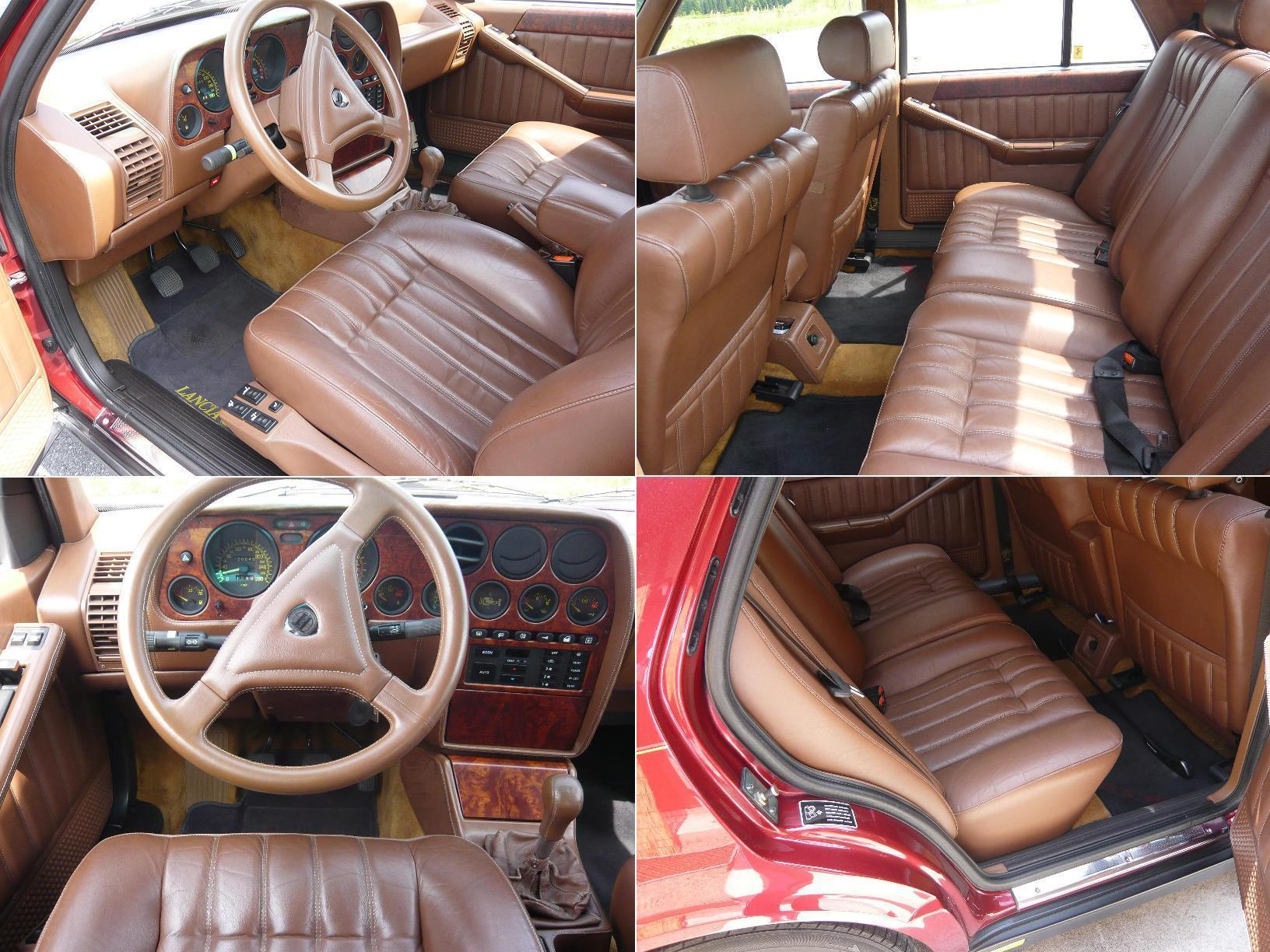
Poltrona Frau interior

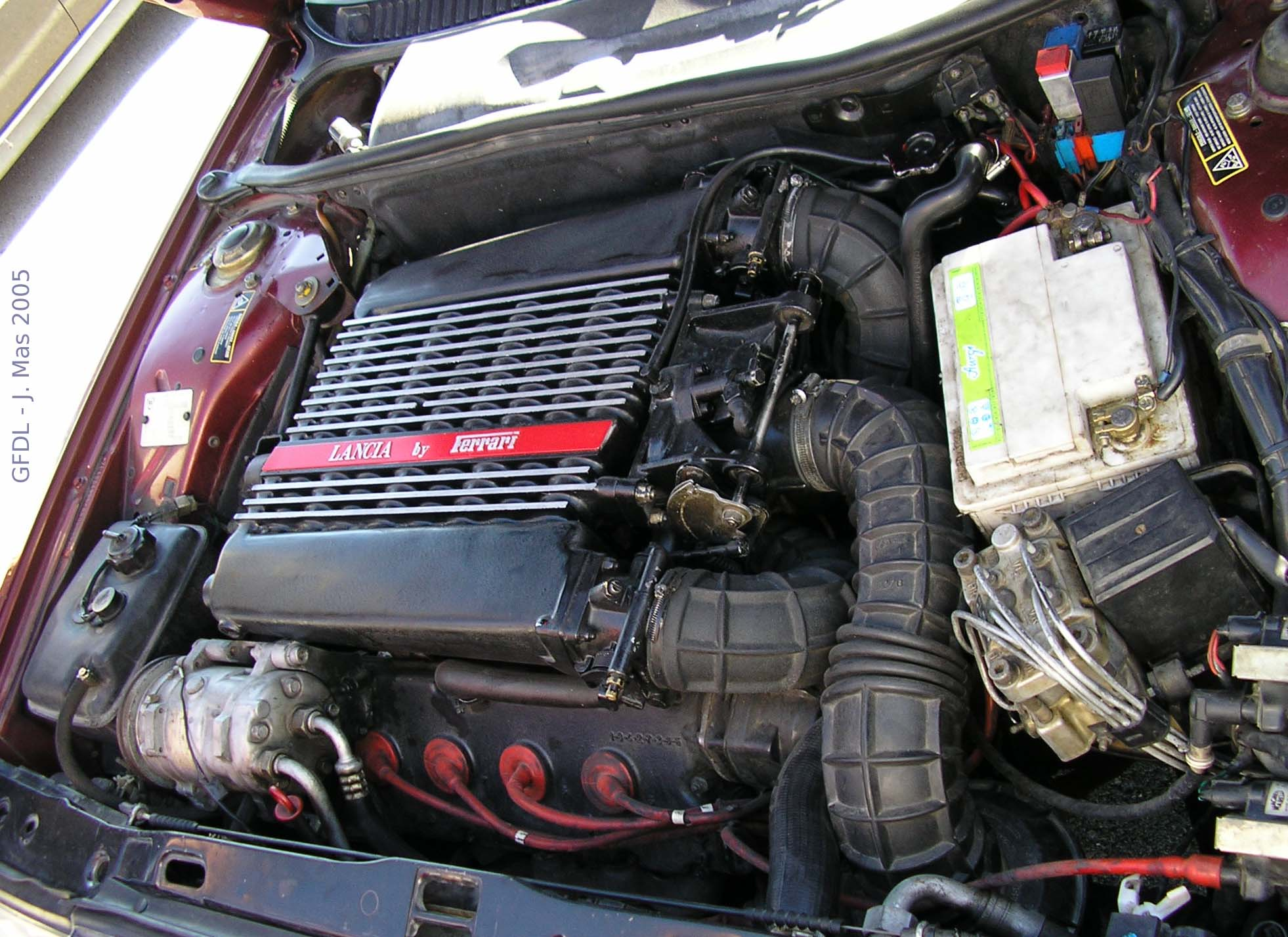
The 3-litre V8 was badged "Lancia by Ferrari"

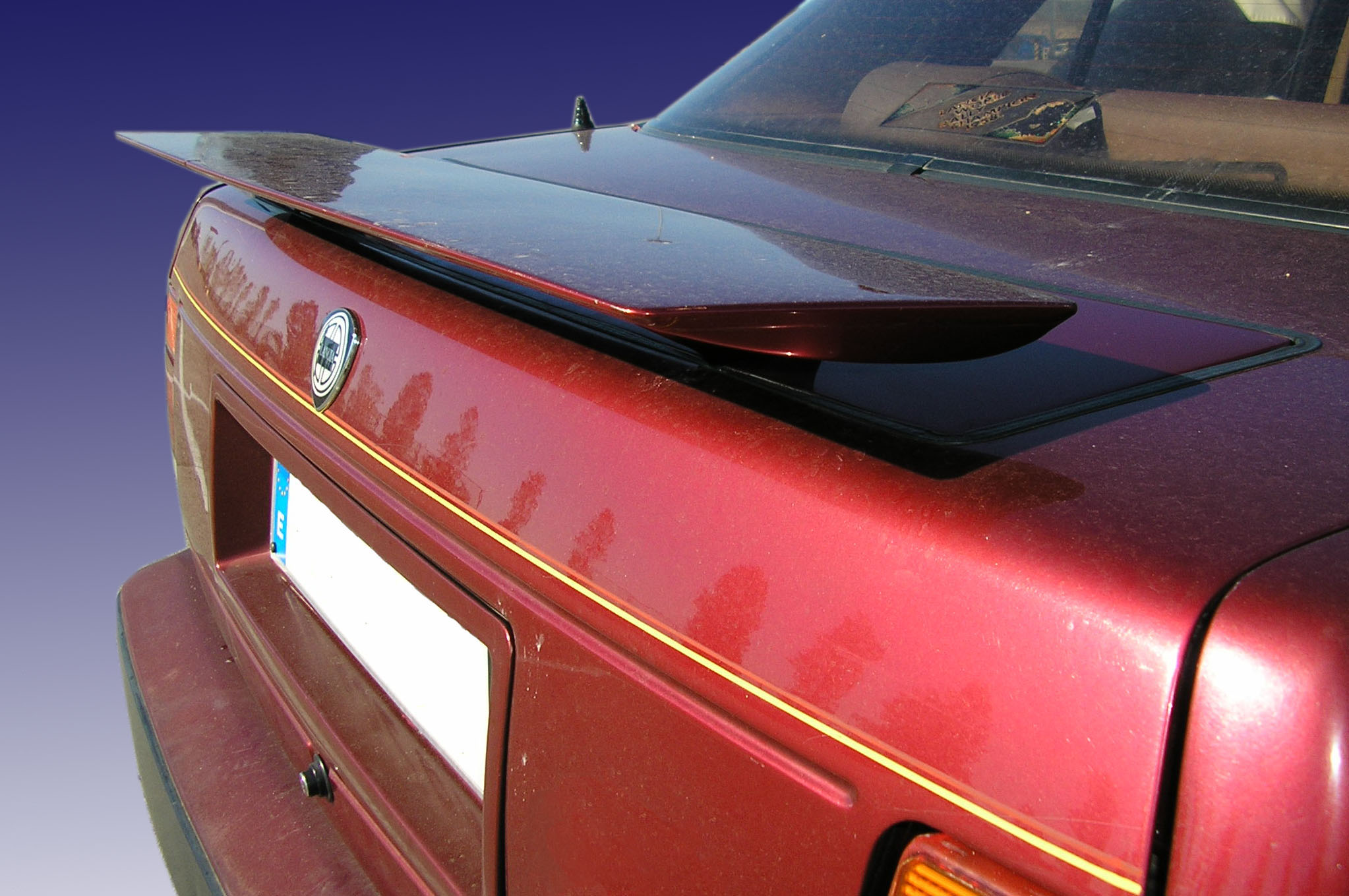
The rear spoiler retracted flush with the boot lid

In 1988, the 8·32 received series 2 updates like other Thema models, including new lights front and rear, a smaller grille badge, removal of model badging at the rear and on the side skirts, and the new side rubbing strips (previously absent on this model). The 8·32 did not receive the facelift treatment of the third series of the Thema. This version of the Thema was produced in limited numbers, with 2,370 Series 1 cars built between 1986 and 1988 and 1,601 Series 2 cars built between 1989 and 1992. All were left-hand drive, although one Thema 8·32 was converted to right hand drive by TAK Motor Co. in South Africa in 1987 for the Managing Director of TAK.

The Thema 8·32's key competitors were some of the fastest saloon models of the late 1980s including the Audi 100 Quattro, BMW M535i, Ford Sierra RS Cosworth, Saab 9000 2.3 Turbo S, and the Vauxhall Lotus Carlton/Opel Lotus Omega. Road & Track described the 8·32 as "one of the weirder sleepers to come out of the 1980s".

Towards the end of his life, Enzo Ferrari owned an 8·32 as his personal transport.

==== Thema Limousine ====
Built only on request for wealthy customers and Fiat Group executives, the Lancia Thema Limousine featured the same interior as the LX and the 8·32 versions. Most of them were powered by a 2.8 L PRV V6 engine, replaced in the last ones by the 3.0 L Alfa Romeo V6 engine. Only 24 Thema Limousines were built. The wheelbase of the car was extended by 30 cm (1 ft) to 2,960 mm (116.5 in), with a resulting overall length of 4,890 mm (192.5 in). The weight increased to 1,400 kg (3,090 lb), or by just over one fifth. The price, meanwhile, was up nearly sixty percent over a comparably equipped regular wheelbase Thema V6.

=== Engines ===
With the exception of the 8·32 Ferrari engine, Thema powerplants originated from the Fiat engine series designed by Aurelio Lampredi, the famed engine designer formerly of Ferrari and Alfa Romeo. The straight-4 2.0 L petrol engine, available in both naturally aspirated and turbocharged versions, was refined and offered good performance. Earlier Themas were also offered with a 2.8 L PRV V6 engine, developed in cooperation with Peugeot, Renault, and Volvo. This unit was replaced in 1992 with a 3.0 L Alfa Romeo V6 engine (Fiat had bought Alfa Romeo in 1986 and gained access to this engine).

Model	Displacement	Power	Torque	Top speed		0–100 km/h (0-62 mph) (seconds)	Years
Model	Displacement	Power	Torque	saloon	station wagon	0–100 km/h (0-62 mph) (seconds)	Years
2.0 8V	1,995 cc (121.7 cu in)	120 PS (88 kW; 118 hp) at 5,250 rpm	170 N⋅m (125 lb⋅ft) at 3,300 rpm	195 km/h (121 mph)	-	9.7	1985–1989
2.0 8V	1,995 cc (121.7 cu in)	116 PS (85 kW; 114 hp) at 5,600 rpm	162 N⋅m (119 lb⋅ft) at 4,000 rpm	191 km/h (119 mph)	-	10.4	1987–1989
2.0 8V	1,995 cc (121.7 cu in)	116 PS (85 kW; 114 hp) at 5,600 rpm	162 N⋅m (119 lb⋅ft) at 4,000 rpm	195 km/h (121 mph)	-	11.4	1989–1995
2.0 16V	1,995 cc (121.7 cu in)	147 PS (108 kW; 145 hp) at 6,000 rpm	173 N⋅m (128 lb⋅ft) at 4,000 rpm	202 km/h (126 mph)	-	10.4	1989–1992
2.0 16V	1,995 cc (121.7 cu in)	155 PS (114 kW; 153 hp) at 6,500 rpm	181 N⋅m (133 lb⋅ft) at 3,500 rpm	205 km/h (127 mph)	-	10.1	1992–1995
2.0 Turbo 8V	1,995 cc (121.7 cu in)	165 PS (121 kW; 163 hp) at 5,500 rpm	290 N⋅m (214 lb⋅ft) at 2,750 rpm	218 km/h (135 mph)	210 km/h (130 mph)	7.2	1985–1988
2.0 Turbo 8V	1,995 cc (121.7 cu in)	150 PS (110 kW; 148 hp) at 5,500 rpm	245 N⋅m (181 lb⋅ft) at 2,700 rpm	210 km/h (130 mph)	-	7.9	1988–1989
2.0 Turbo 16V	1,995 cc (121.7 cu in)	180 PS (132 kW; 178 hp) at 5,500 rpm	270 N⋅m (199 lb⋅ft) at 2,500 rpm	222 km/h (138 mph)	-	8.0	1989–1992
2.0 Turbo 16V	1,995 cc (121.7 cu in)	205 PS (151 kW; 202 hp) at 5,750 rpm	304 N⋅m (224 lb⋅ft) at 3,750 rpm	230 km/h (143 mph)	-	7.2	1992–1995
2.8 V6 12V	2,849 cc (173.9 cu in)	150 PS (110 kW; 148 hp) at 5,250 rpm	245 N⋅m (181 lb⋅ft) at 2,700 rpm	208 km/h (129 mph)	-	8.2	1985–1989
2.8 V6 12V	2,849 cc (173.9 cu in)	150 PS (110 kW; 148 hp) at 5,000 rpm	225 N⋅m (166 lb⋅ft) at 3,500 rpm	205 km/h (127 mph)	-	8.4	1989–1992
3.0 V6 12V	2,959 cc (180.6 cu in)	175 PS (129 kW; 173 hp) at 5,500 rpm	250 N⋅m (184 lb⋅ft) at 4,500 rpm	220 km/h (137 mph)	-	8.1	1992–1995
8·32	2,927 cc (178.6 cu in)	215 PS (158 kW; 212 hp) at 6,750 rpm	285 N⋅m (210 lb⋅ft) at 4,500 rpm	240 km/h (149 mph)	-	6.8	1987–1989
8·32	2,927 cc (178.6 cu in)	205 PS (151 kW; 202 hp) at 6,750 rpm	263 N⋅m (194 lb⋅ft) at 5,000 rpm	235 km/h (146 mph)	-	7.2	1989–1992
2.5 TD	2,445 cc (149.2 cu in)	100 PS (74 kW; 99 hp) at 4,100 rpm	217 N⋅m (160 lb⋅ft) at 2,300 rpm	185 km/h (115 mph)	180 km/h (112 mph)	11.9	1985–1989
2.5 TD	2,499 cc (152.5 cu in)	118 PS (87 kW; 116 hp) at 3,900 rpm	245 N⋅m (181 lb⋅ft) at 2,200 rpm	195 km/h (121 mph)	-	11.0	1989–1992
2.5 TD	2,499 cc (152.5 cu in)	118 PS (87 kW; 116 hp) at 4,100 rpm	245 N⋅m (181 lb⋅ft) at 2,400 rpm	195 km/h (121 mph)	-	11.5	1992–1995

== Second generation (2011–2014) ==
Lancia Thema II
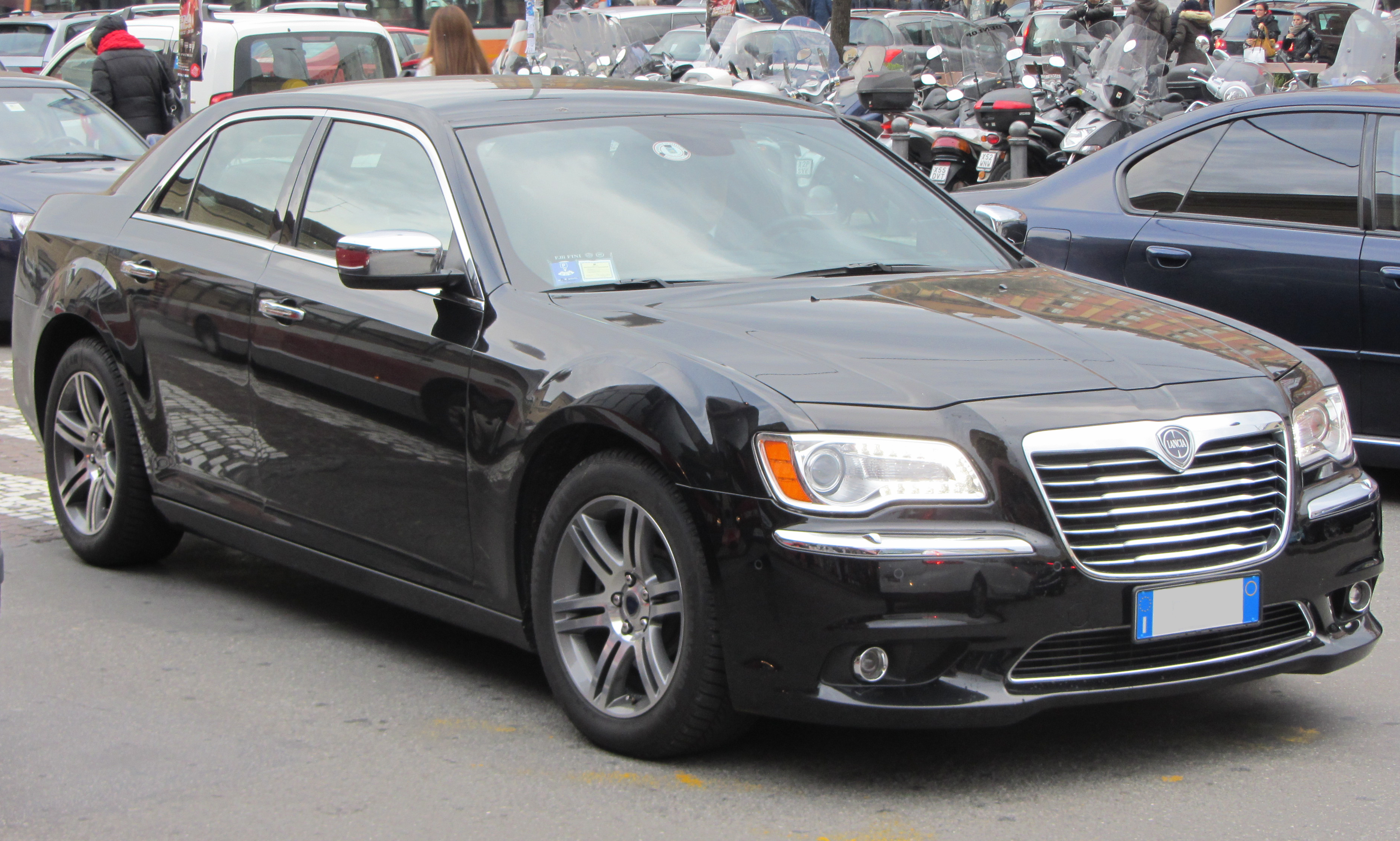

Overview
- Manufacturer: Fiat Group Automobiles
- Also called: Chrysler 300 (North America); Chrysler 300C
- Production: 2011–2014
- Model years: 2011–2014
- Assembly: Canada: Brampton, Ontario (Brampton Assembly)

Body and chassis
- Body style: 4-door notchback saloon
- Layout: Front-engine, rear-wheel-drive
- Platform: Chrysler LD platform
- Related: Dodge Charger; Dodge Challenger

Powertrain
- Engine: 3.6 L Chrysler Pentastar V6; 3.0 L VM A630 turbodiesel V6
- Transmission: 5-speed 5G-Tronic automatic; 8-speed ZF 8HP45 automatic

Dimensions
- Wheelbase: 120.2 in (3,053 mm)
- Length: 198.6 in (5,044 mm)
- Width: 75.1 in (1,908 mm)
- Height: 58.4 in (1,483 mm)

Chronology
- Predecessor: Lancia Thesis

Chrysler marketed the 300C for model years 2011–2014 as the Lancia Thema in Europe's left hand drive markets. Right-hand drive markets (the United Kingdom and Ireland) kept the Chrysler 300C badging.

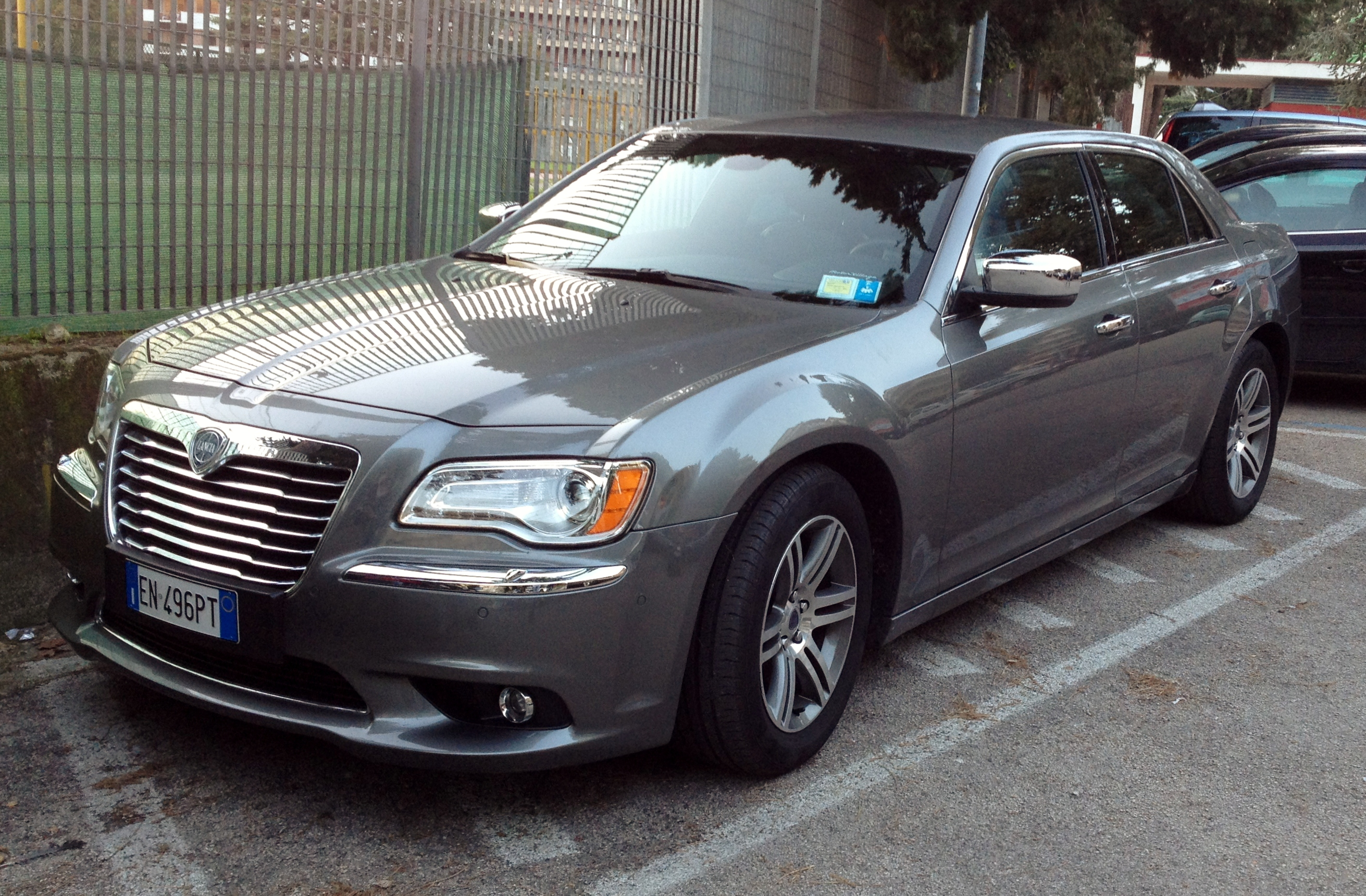
Lancia Thema

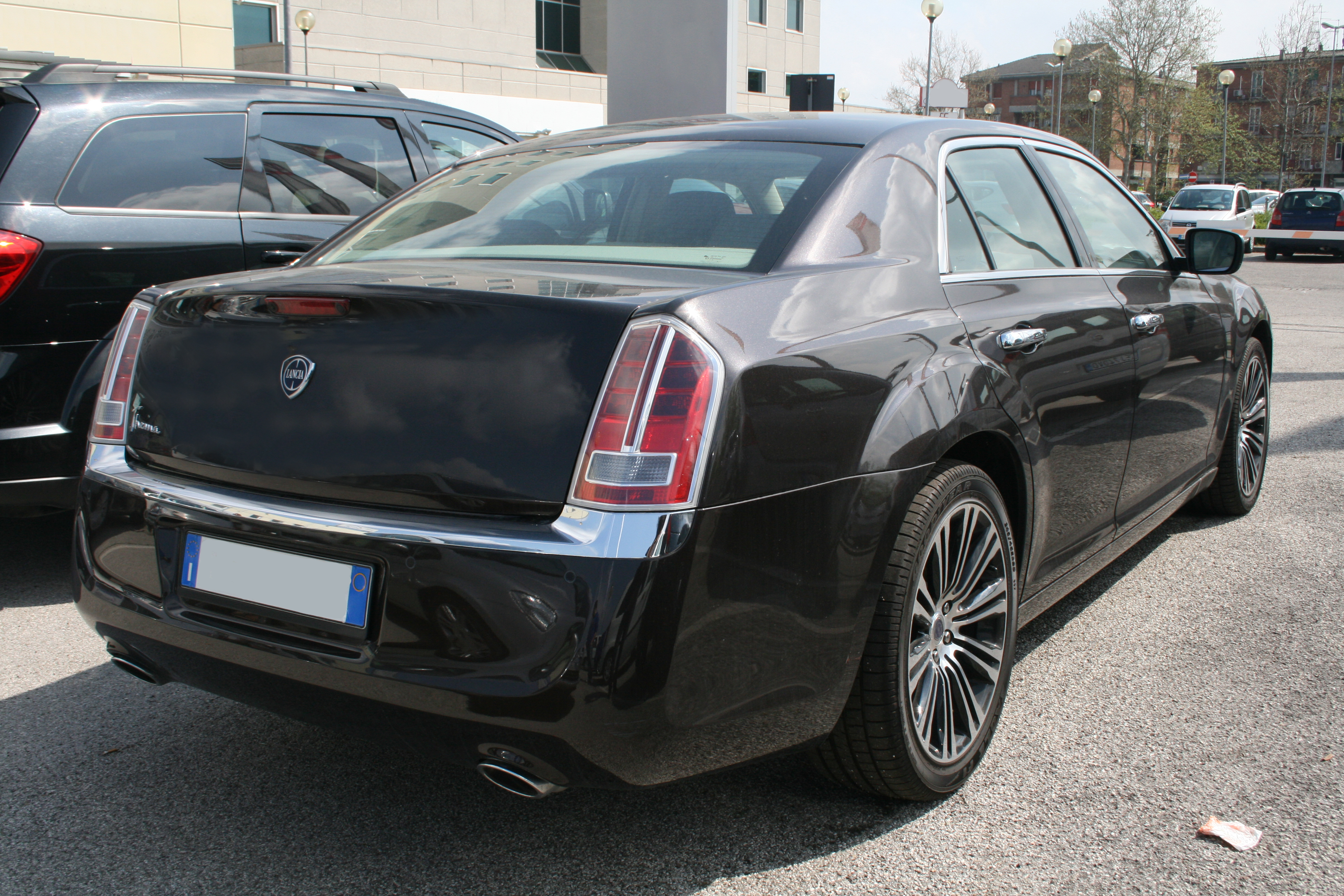
Lancia Thema rear view

=== Powertrain ===
Lancia - (Chrysler UK)
Model	Engine	Displacement	Power at rpm	Torque at rpm	Years
Petrol	3.6 V6 Pentastar	3,604 cc (219.9 cu in)	286 PS (210 kW; 282 hp) at 6,350 rpm	340 N⋅m (251 lbf⋅ft) at 4,650 rpm	2011–2014
Diesel	3.0 V6 VM Motori A630	2,987 cc (182.3 cu in)	190 PS (140 kW; 187 hp) at 4,000 rpm	440 N⋅m (325 lbf⋅ft) at 1,600–2,800 rpm	2011–2014
Diesel	3.0 V6 VM Motori A630	2,987 cc (182.3 cu in)	239 PS (176 kW; 236 hp) at 4,000 rpm	550 N⋅m (406 lbf⋅ft) at 1,800–2,800 rpm	2011–2014
