= Vauxhall Cresta =

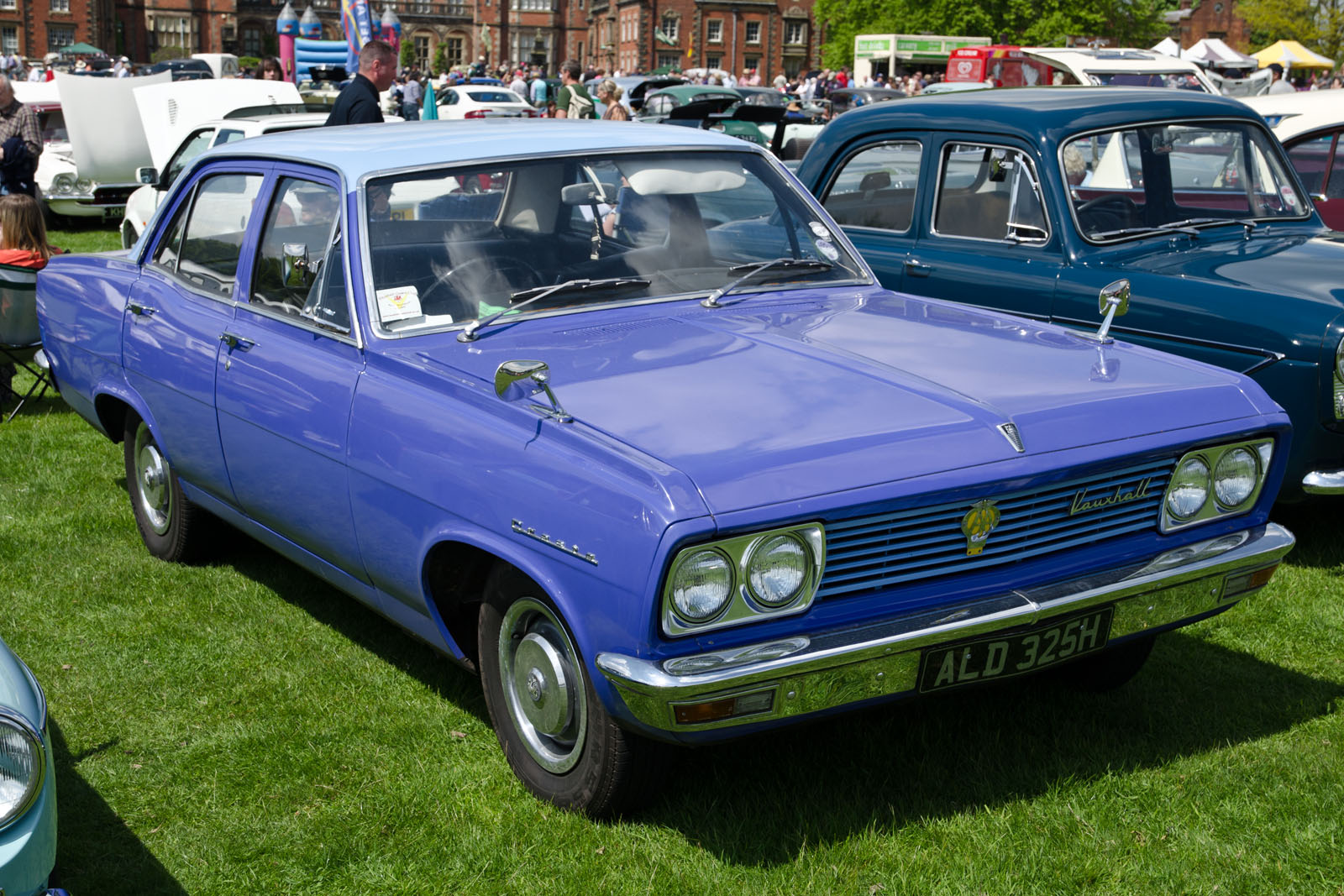
- Vauxhall Cresta PC

Overview
- Manufacturer: Vauxhall (General Motors)
- Production: 1954–1972
- Assembly: United Kingdom; Australia; New Zealand

Body and chassis
- Class: Executive car (E)
- Related: Vauxhall Velox; Vauxhall Wyvern

Chronology
- Predecessor: Vauxhall Velox PB Series (since 1965)
- Successor: Vauxhall Ventora FE

The Vauxhall Cresta is a British automobile which was produced by Vauxhall from 1954 to 1972. The Cresta was introduced in 1954 as an upmarket version of the Vauxhall Velox, itself a six-cylinder version of the Vauxhall Wyvern. The Cresta models were the E (1954–1957), PA (1957–1962), PB (1962–1965) and PC (1965–1972). The Viscount (1966–1972) was an upmarket Cresta PC.

== Cresta E ==
Vauxhall Cresta E
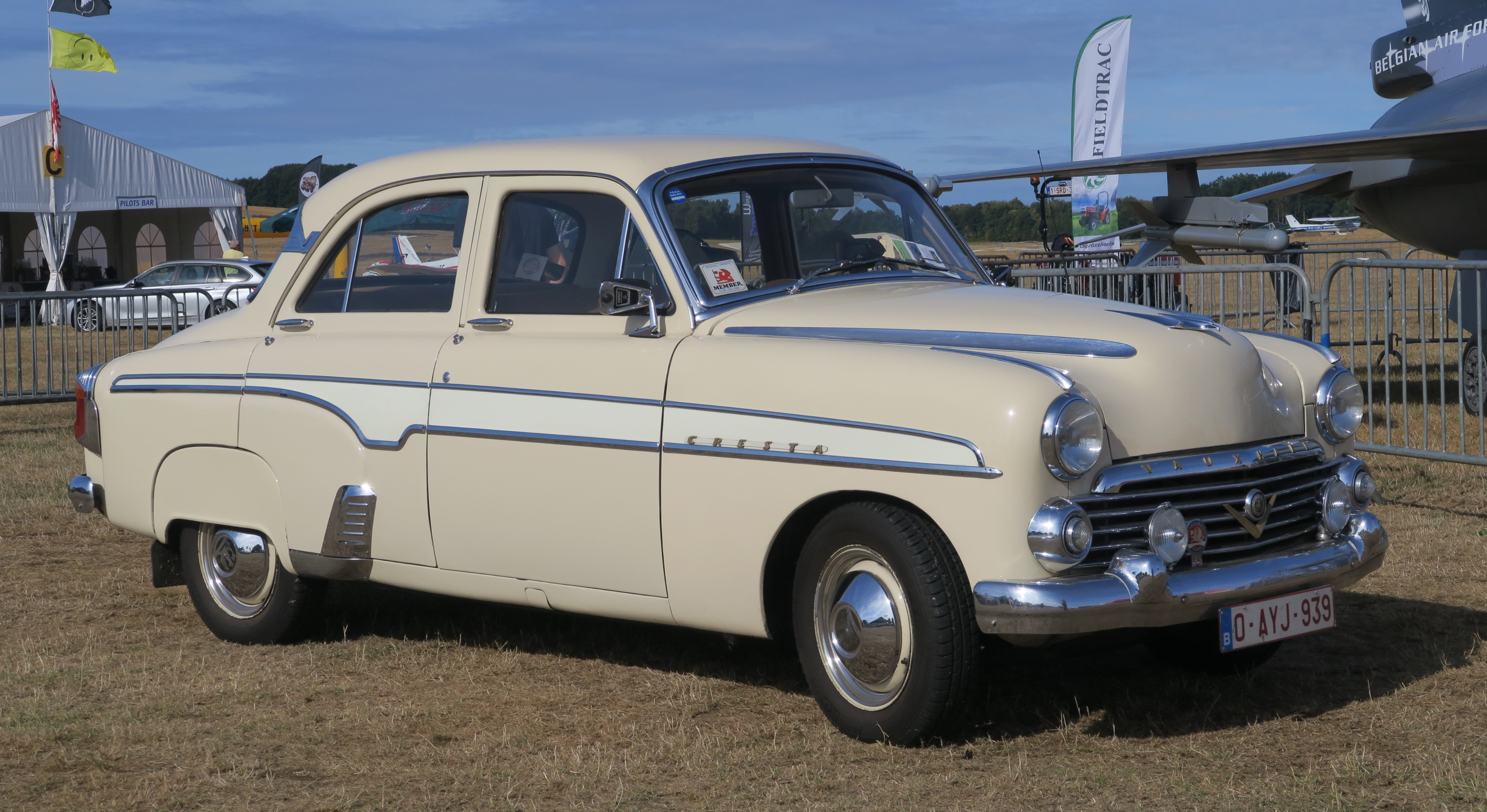

Overview
- Production: 1954–1957; 166,504 produced.

Body and chassis
- Body style: 4-door saloon

Powertrain
- Engine: 2.3 L ohv I6
- Transmission: 3-speed manual

Dimensions
- Wheelbase: 103 in (2,600 mm)
- Length: 172 in (4,400 mm)
- Width: 66.5 in (1,690 mm)
- Height: 61.5 in (1,560 mm)

The Vauxhall Velox had been introduced in 1948, with a new version in 1951. The Cresta E version, launched in 1954, had the same 2262 cc six-cylinder engine in the same state of tune but scored over the Velox in having a choice of leather or fabric upholstery, optional two-tone paintwork, a heater as standard, a small electric fascia mounted clock, a cigar lighter, a lamp automatically illuminating the boot when opened and a vanity mirror on the inside of the front passenger's sun visor along with a special ornamental badge above the V (for Vauxhall) badge on the nose of the car. A radio was optional.

In October 1955, a facelift model with deeper front and rear screens was introduced. The balanced drop windows were replaced by ones with proper winding mechanisms, there were interior trim improvements, separate amber rear flasher lights and windscreen washers became standard. A new chrome-plated grille with fewer vertical slats replaced the earlier diecast version. This model was assembled in New Zealand, alongside the Wyvern and Velox, with 840 being built in 1956, according to a local owners' group with access to copies of the GM Petone plant ledgers. More changes were made in October 1956, with a new grille with horizontal bars, higher compression ratio engine, electrically operated windscreen wipers (replacing the camshaft driven system) and changes to the body trim and two tone colour scheme. In June 1957, the Cresta received a redesigned engine of the same capacity based on the deeper block design introduced in four-cylinder form in the Victor F series in March of that year.

A Cresta tested by the British magazine The Motor in 1956 had a top speed of 82.2 mph (132.3 km/h) and could accelerate from 0-60 mph (97 km/h) in 20.2 seconds. A petrol consumption of 23.5 miles per imperial gallon (12.0 L/100 km; 19.6 mpg_{‑US}) was recorded. The test car cost £931 including taxes.

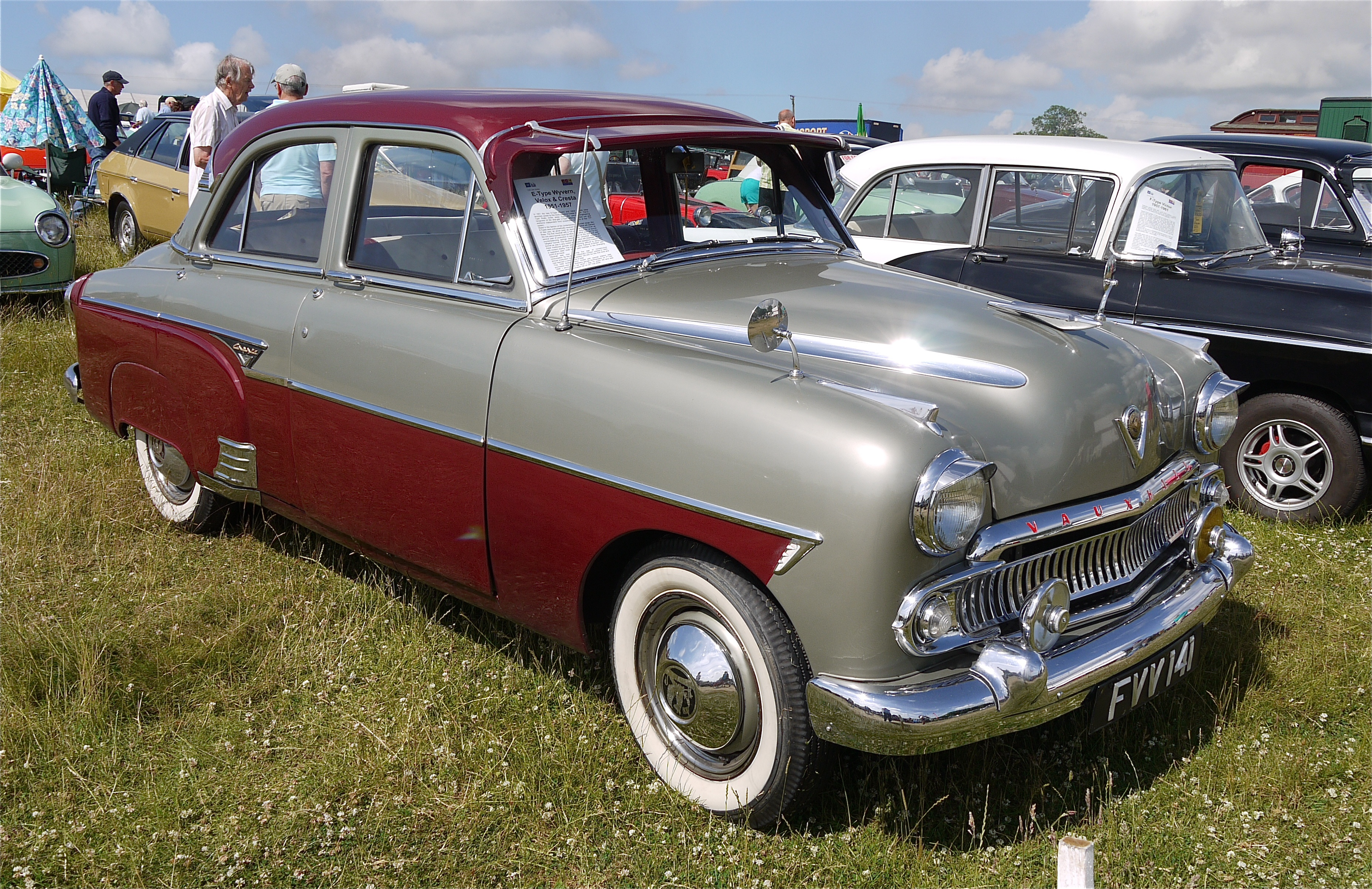
Vauxhall Cresta E (1955–56)

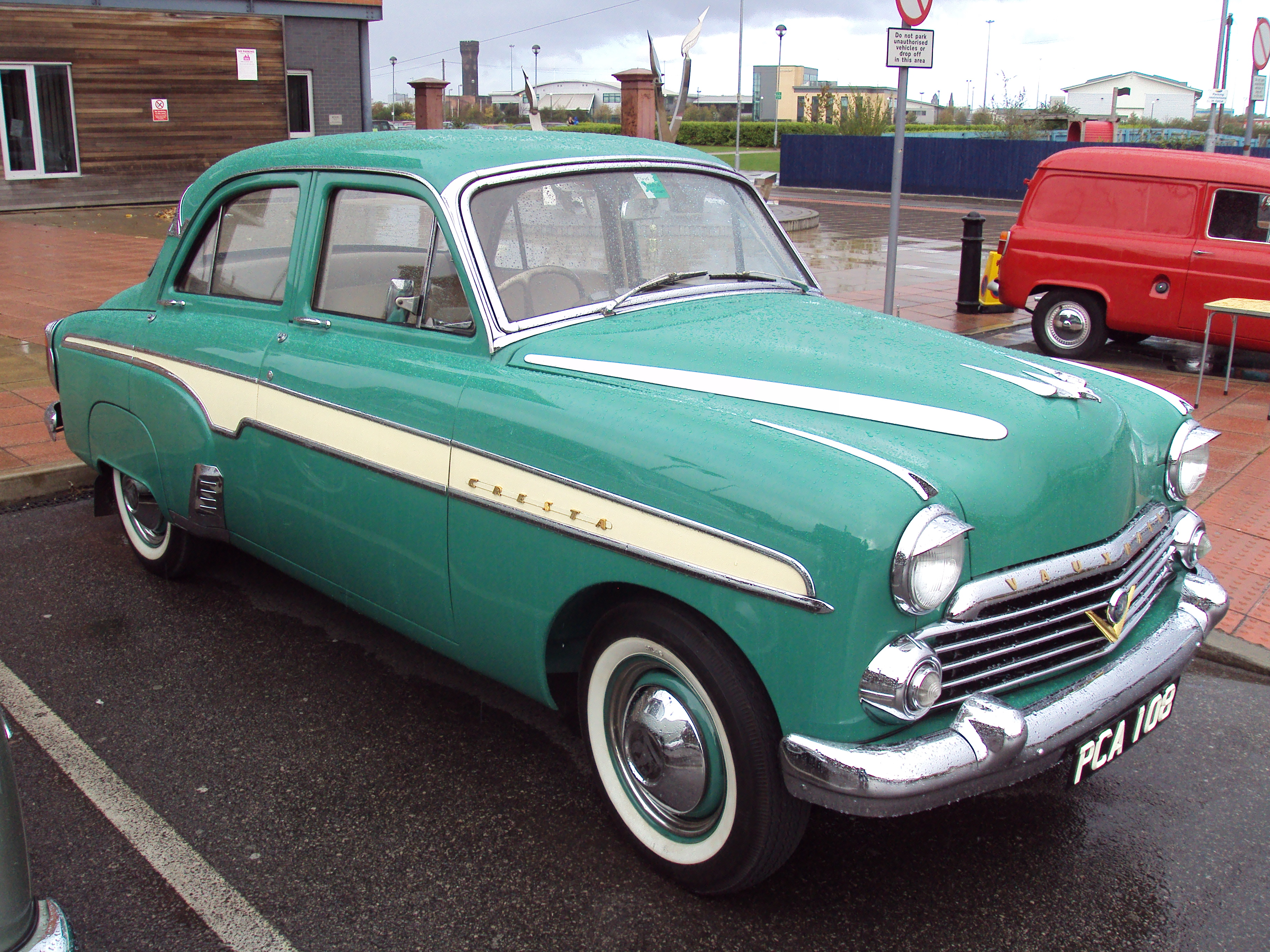
Vauxhall Cresta E (1956–57)

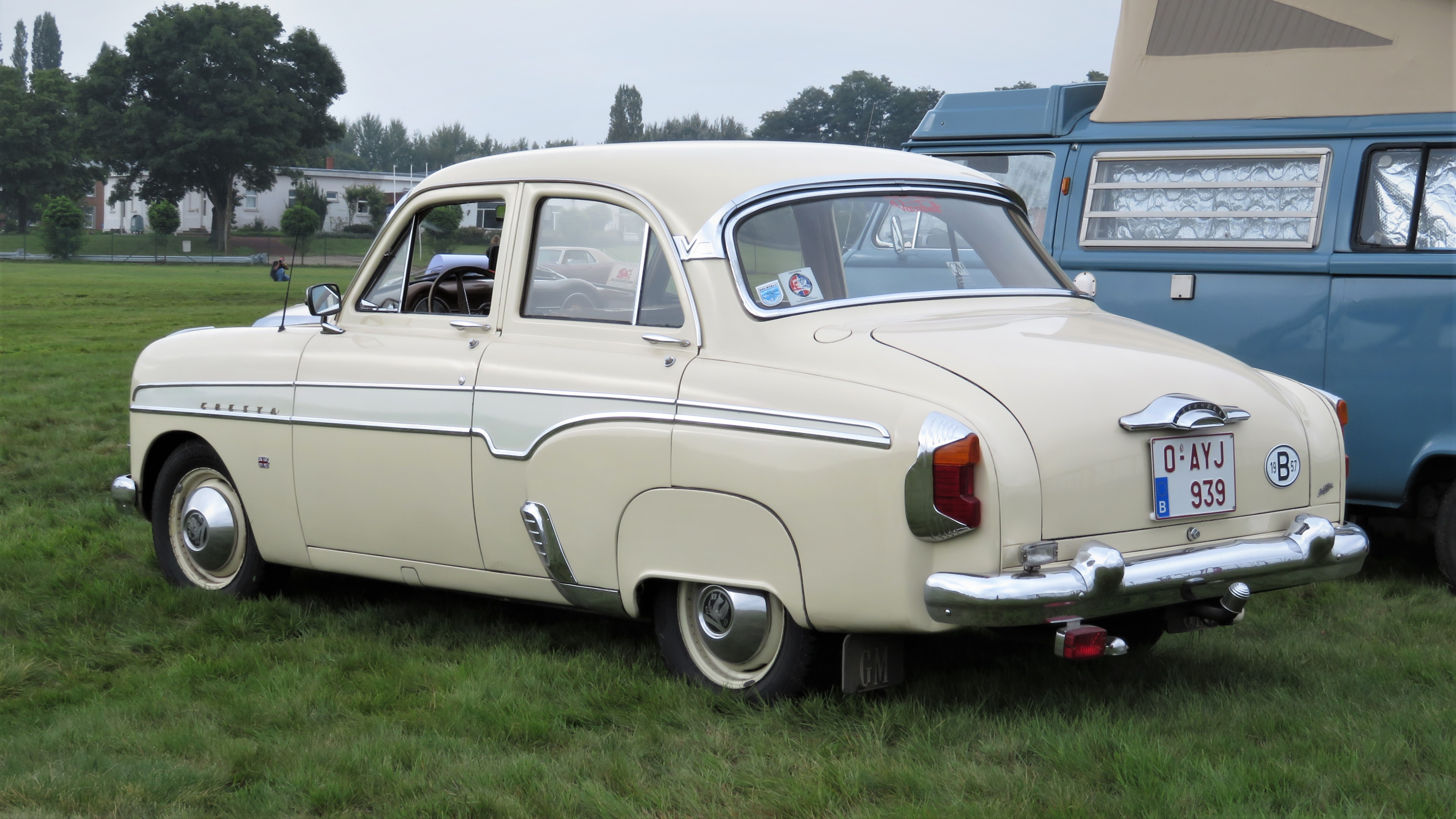
Vauxhall Cresta E (1956–57) viewed from behind

== Cresta PA ==
Vauxhall Cresta PA
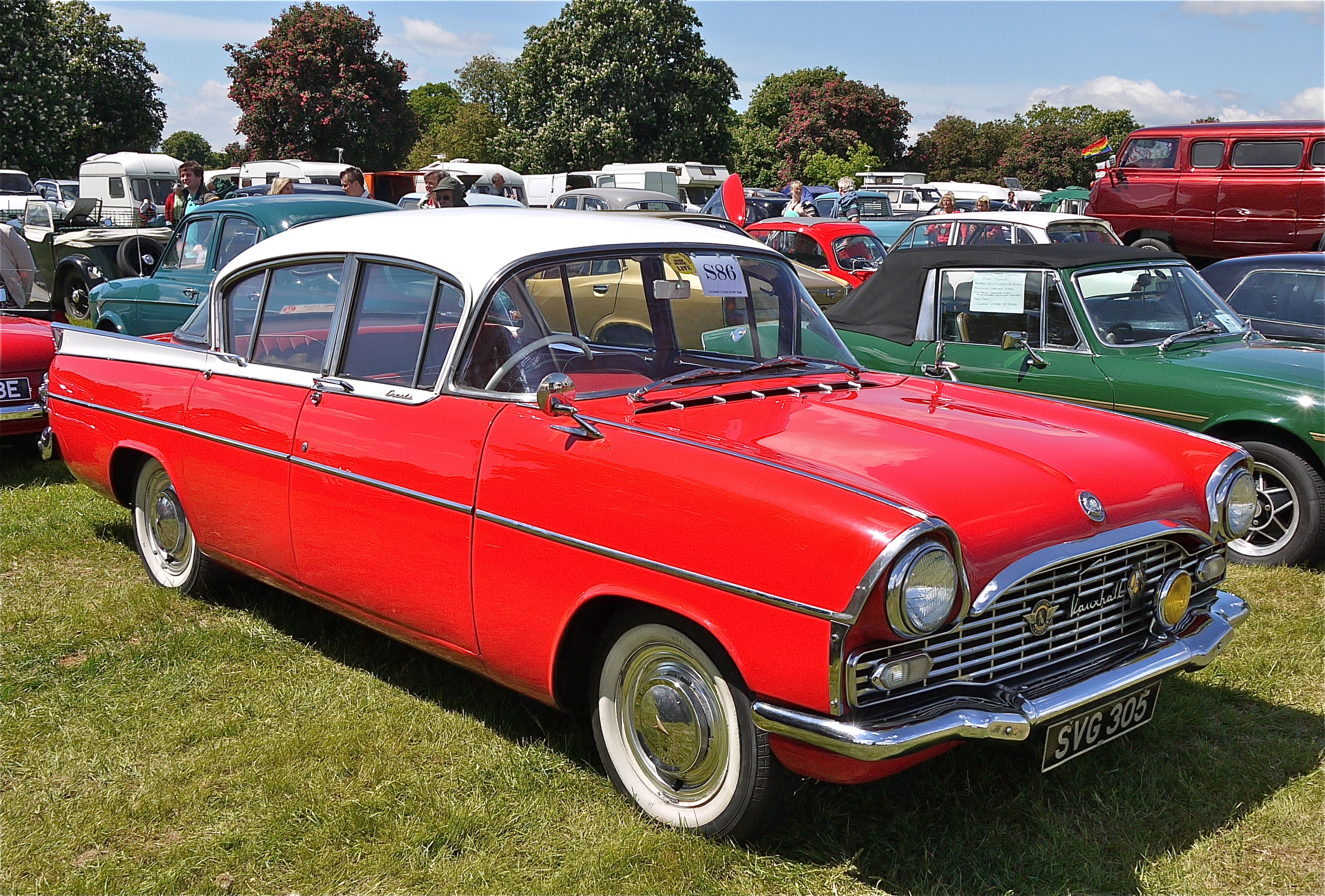
- PA SY 1961

Overview
- Production: 1957–1962; 81,841 made

Body and chassis
- Body style: 4-door saloon 5-door estate car

Powertrain
- Engine: 2,262 cc ohv I6 (1958-1960); 2,651 cc ohv I6 (1961-1962)
- Transmission: 3-speed manual, Overdrive optional Hydramatic Automatic available from 1961

Dimensions
- Wheelbase: 105 in (2,667 mm)
- Length: 179 in (4,547 mm) (saloon)
- Width: 68.5 in (1,740 mm)
- Height: 57 in (1,448 mm)

The PA Cresta was announced on 2 October 1957. It mimicked the American fashion for tail-fins, wrap-around windows and white-wall tyres, taking its cues from Harley Earl's 1954 Pontiac Strato-Streak concept. Opel was also offering a similarly sized and styled car at the time, the Opel Kapitän P1. All factory-built PAs were four-door saloons: the estate cars were converted by Friary of Basingstoke, Hampshire and are rare today.

The PA Cresta had independent front suspension using coil springs and an anti-roll bar with a rigid axle and semi-elliptic leaf springs at the rear. The Lockheed brakes used 9 in (230 mm) drums all round. Carried over from the last of the E series cars, the 2,262 cc six-cylinder engine had pushrod-operated overhead valves and a compression ratio of 7.8:1 (a low compression 6.8:1 version was available); it produced 82.5 bhp (61.5 kW) at 4,400 rpm. A single Zenith carburettor was used. The transmission had three forward speeds.

It was well equipped with leather and nylon upholstery for its bench front and rear seats and woven pile carpet. A heater was fitted as standard. The radio remained an option on the home market. Other options included fog lamps, reversing light, locking filler cap and external mirrors. To keep the front floor clear to seat six people the handbrake lever was mounted under the dashboard and the gearchange lever was column mounted. The car could be ordered painted in either single or two tone colours.

A PA tested by the British magazine The Motor in 1958 had a top speed of 89.8 mph (144.5 km/h) and could accelerate from 0-60 mph (97 km/h) in 16.8 seconds. A petrol consumption of 25.2 miles per imperial gallon (11.2 L/100 km; 21.0 mpg_{‑US}) was recorded. The test car cost £1073 including taxes of £358. They tested the 2.6 Litre version with overdrive in 1960 and found the top speed had increased to 94.7 mph (152.4 km/h), acceleration from 0-60 mph (97 km/h) to 15.2 seconds and fuel consumption improved to 26.8 miles per imperial gallon (10.5 L/100 km; 22.3 mpg_{‑US}). The test car cost £1077 including taxes of £317. The car without overdrive cost £1014.

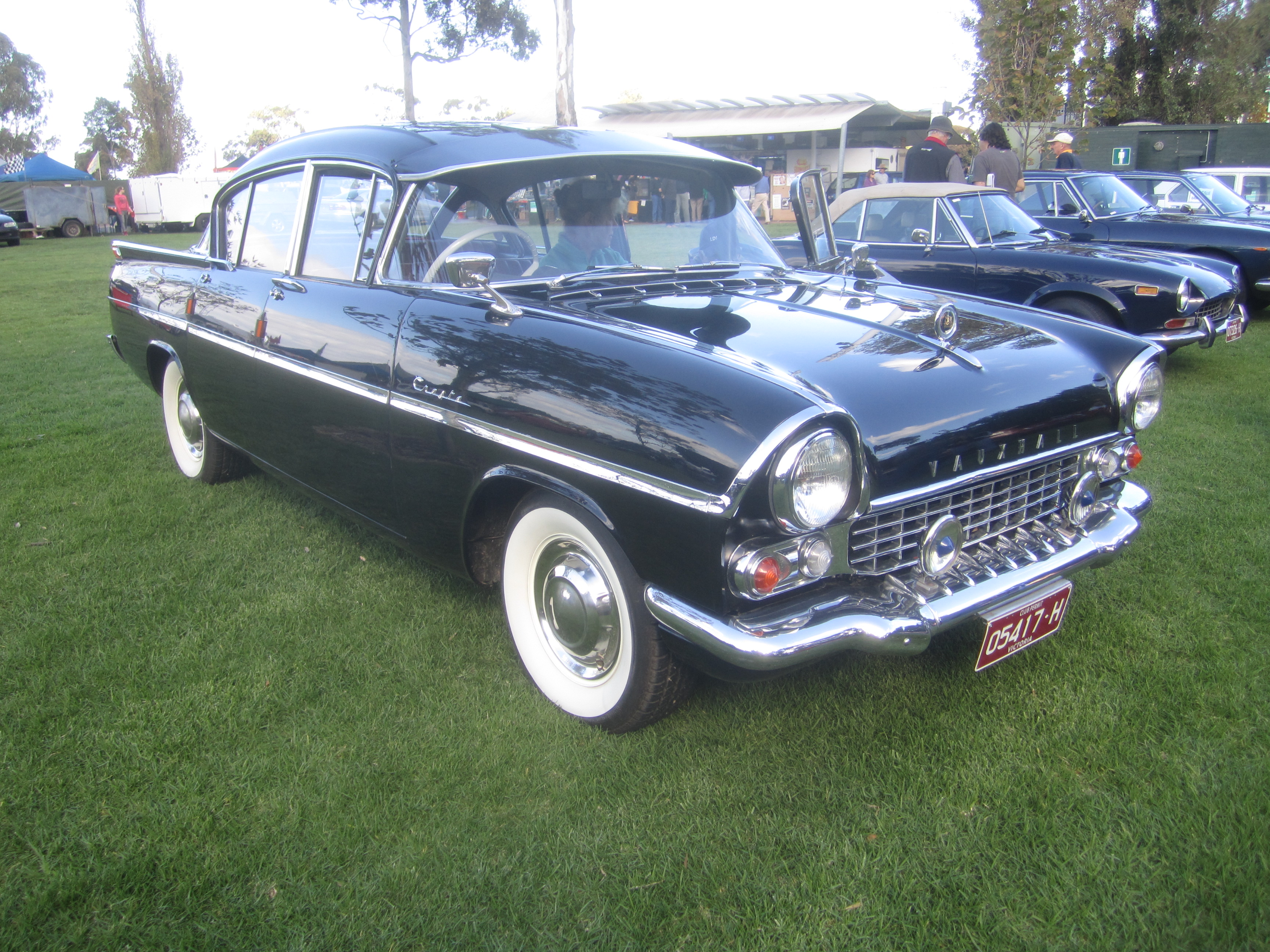
PA S saloon 1957

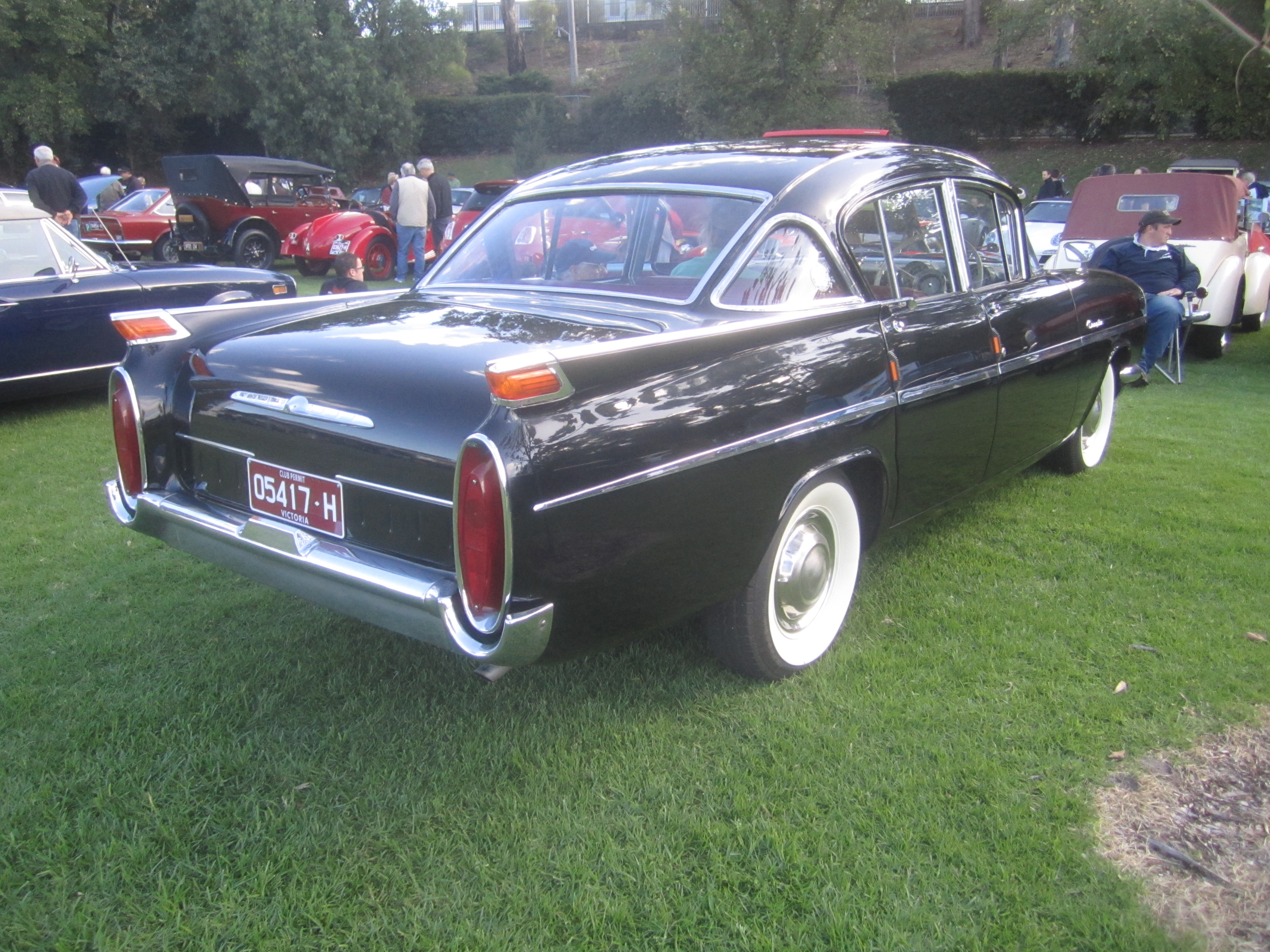
PA S saloon 1957 rear

PA SY Friary estate 1962

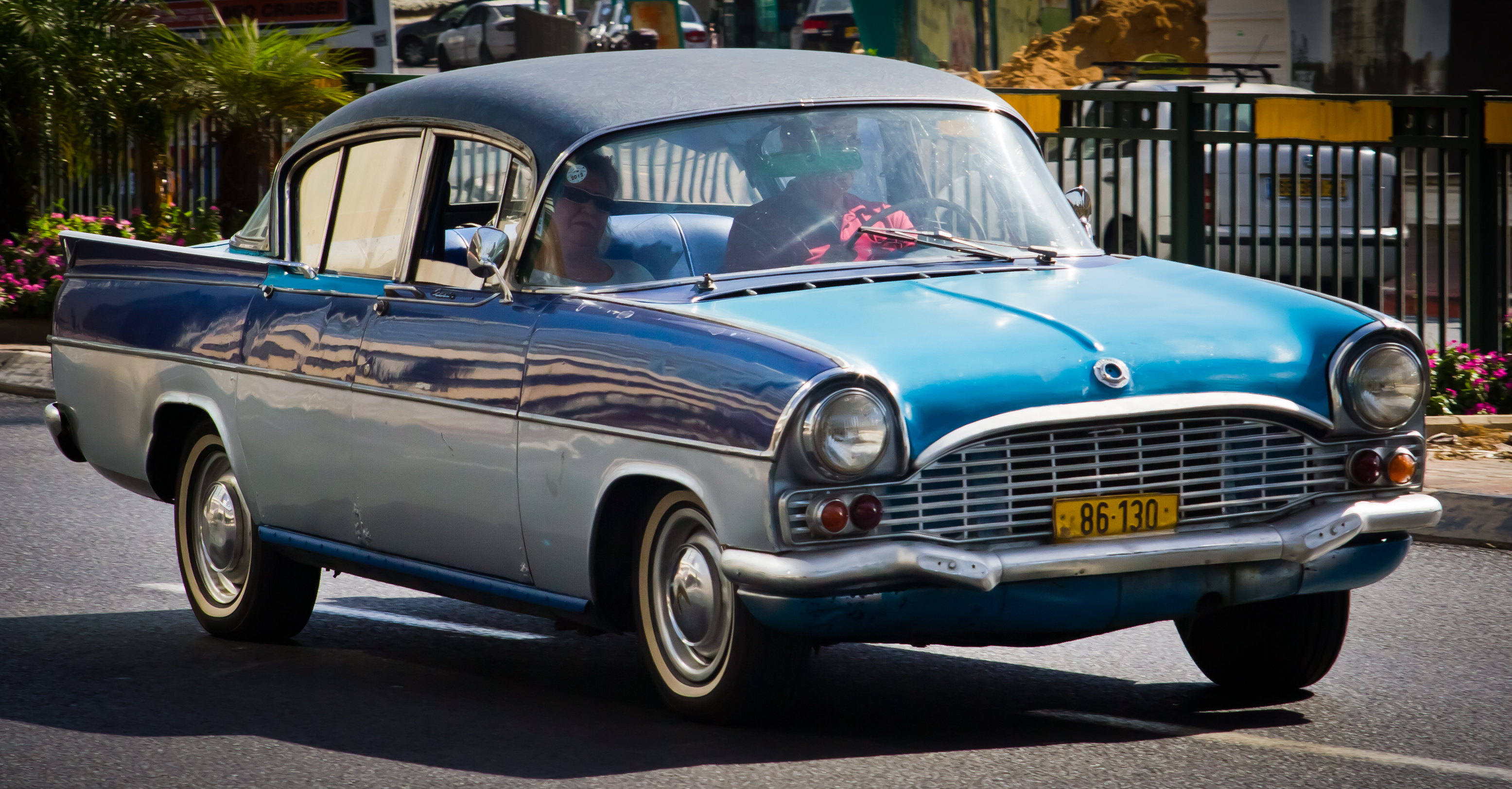
PA saloon in Israel

Australian assembly of the PA Cresta began in May 1958 by General Motors Holden. Subsequent models were assembled up until 1965.

In August 1959, the Cresta was given a facelift, with a new, larger, grille and the replacement of the three piece rear window with a single wrap around screen. The previous ribbed roof panel was replaced with a smoothly contoured version (with structural revisions to the C pillars and rear parcel shelf area to retain structural strength). The Vauxhall flutes on the front wings finally disappeared, replaced by a straight chrome side moulding which was also the division point for the two tone colour scheme. Further changes came in August 1960 with the introduction of a new engine of square dimensions (bore and stroke were both 82.55mm) with a redesigned, longer, cylinder block and a capacity of 2651cc. A further increase in compression ratio to 8.0:1 and larger valves in wedge shaped combustion chambers contributed to a power output of 95 bhp at 4,600rpm. Increased diameter wheels allowed larger brakes to be fitted, but these were still of the drum type (Ford had introduced front disc brakes as an option on the rival Zephyr/Zodiac models in September 1960 and would make them standard in June 1961). The Cresta engine was also used in the Bedford J0 light trucks, and offered saloon levels of performance.

Externally, there was a redesign of the rear lights, with shallower units replacing the elongated oval ones of the previous versions. The direction indicators, previously in the rear tail fins were now incorporated in the main lamp unit and the fins were now solid with a V for Vauxhall badge. The rear bumper was now a higher mounted straight topped design. The front sidelights and direction indicators, previously separate were now in a combined housing and there were redesigned wheel trims and hub caps. Inside, a redesigned fascia with a padded top and a horizontal speedometer was featured. In October 1961 the final updates to the PA series were made. Front disc brakes became an optional extra (four months after Ford had made them standard on the Zephyr/Zodiac). Separate front seats became an option to the standard bench and there was now wood trim to the fascia and door cappings. The PA Cresta continued in production in this form until replaced by the PB series in October 1962.

During the 1970s, many PA Crestas were modified and customised. The model was very popular with fifties revivalists; many were driven by teddy boys and were very much seen as part of the rock 'n' roll image. A 1960 PA Cresta features in the 1981 video for "Ghost Town" by The Specials, in which the band are wearing '50s-style clothing.The Specials Ghost Town Car can now be seen in the Coventry Music Museum.

Today the PA Cresta is a recognised classic, with the other variants perhaps less appreciated but gaining recognition. One famous PA owner in the late 1950s was Don Lang.

== Cresta PB ==
Vauxhall Cresta PB
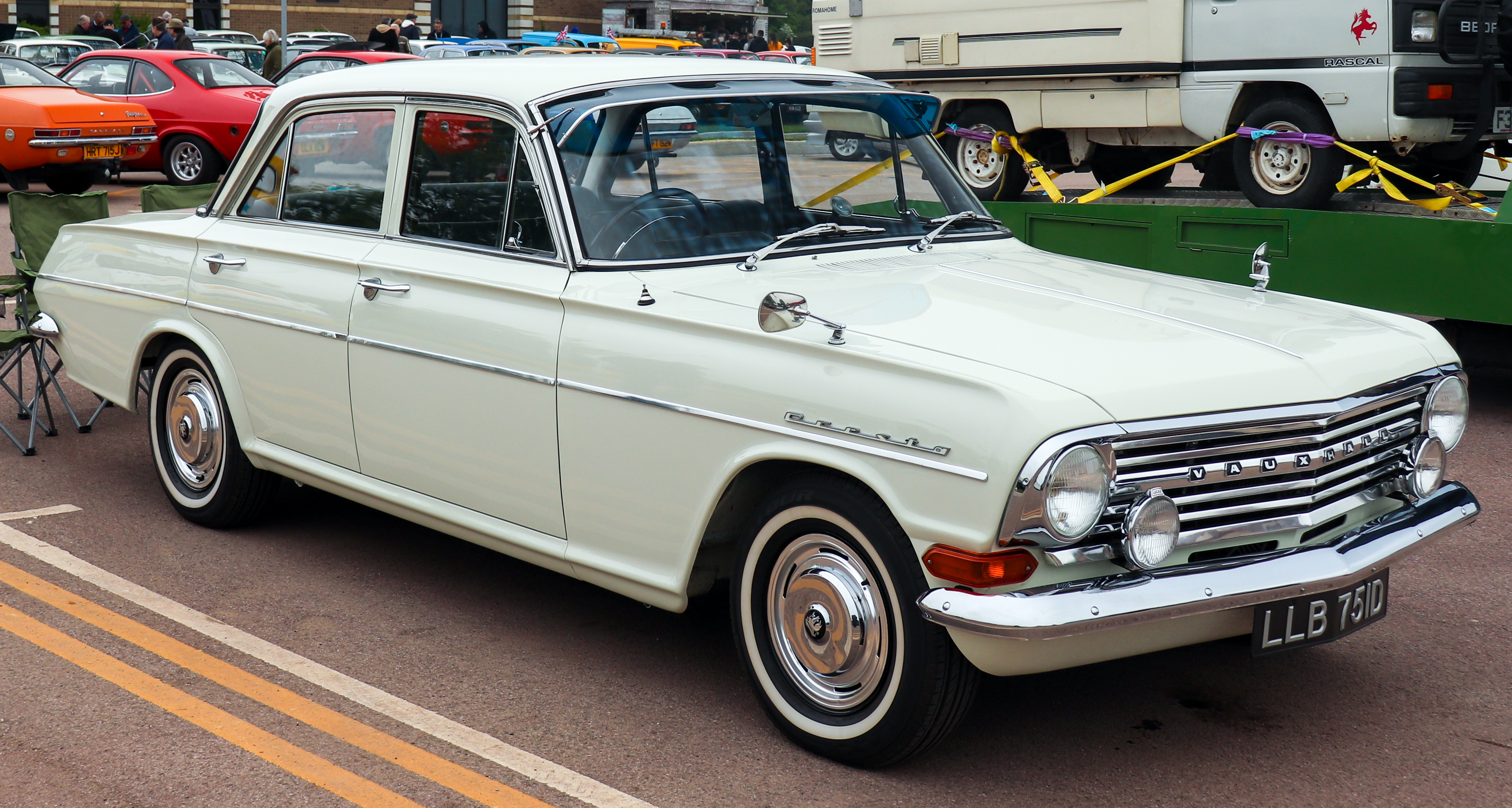
- Vauxhall Cresta PB Saloon (post facelift)

Overview
- Production: 1962–1965; 87,047 made
- Assembly: United Kingdom; Australia

Body and chassis
- Body style: four-door saloon five-door estate car

Powertrain
- Engine: 2,651 cc ohv I6; 3,294 cc ohv I6
- Transmission: 3 or 4-speed manual 2 or 3-speed automatic

Dimensions
- Wheelbase: 107.5 in (2,730 mm)
- Length: 181.75 in (4,616 mm)
- Width: 70.25 in (1,784 mm)
- Height: 56.5 in (1,440 mm)

The PB was a major styling revision, completely eliminating the tailfins, with a flat bonnet and generally more conservative styling taking its cues from the Victor FB introduced the previous year and with which it shared its doors. The engine was the same 2,651 cc (162 cu in) straight six as the last of the PA series and although the compression ratio was increased to 8.5:1, power output remained at 95 bhp. Front disc brakes were now fitted as standard. In October 1963, an estate conversion was made available, the work carried out by Martin Walter Ltd. of Bedford Dormobile fame and fully approved by Vauxhall. The conversion featured a steel-framed glass fibre roof extension and tailgate. The rear doors with squared-off window frames were straight from the factory-built Victor estate. In October 1964 the engine was increased in capacity to 3293 cc by virtue of a larger, 92 mm, bore in combination with the original 82.55 mm stroke. Power increased to 115 bhp at 4,200 rpm. The model received a new full-width chrome grille incorporating the headlights and there was a full-length chrome strip along the body sides.

The gearbox was still three-speed with column change but an overdrive was available. As standard, the 3.3-litre cars had a three-speed column-change gearbox, with a four-speed floor-change unit as an option. Three-speed hydramatic automatic transmission was available with both engines but this was changed to the two-speed Powerglide unit towards the end of the 3.3-litre PB run. Servo-assisted brakes, with discs at the front, were fitted. Minor changes to gearing and the option of power steering were introduced early in 1965 and, later in 1965, the white park/indicator front lamps were changed to amber lens indicators with the parking lamps now in the headlamps for the home market due to legislation changes. The PB series continued until replaced by the PC models in October of that year.

Australia continued to locally assemble the PB Cresta. New Zealand fully imported the PB Cresta from Britain.

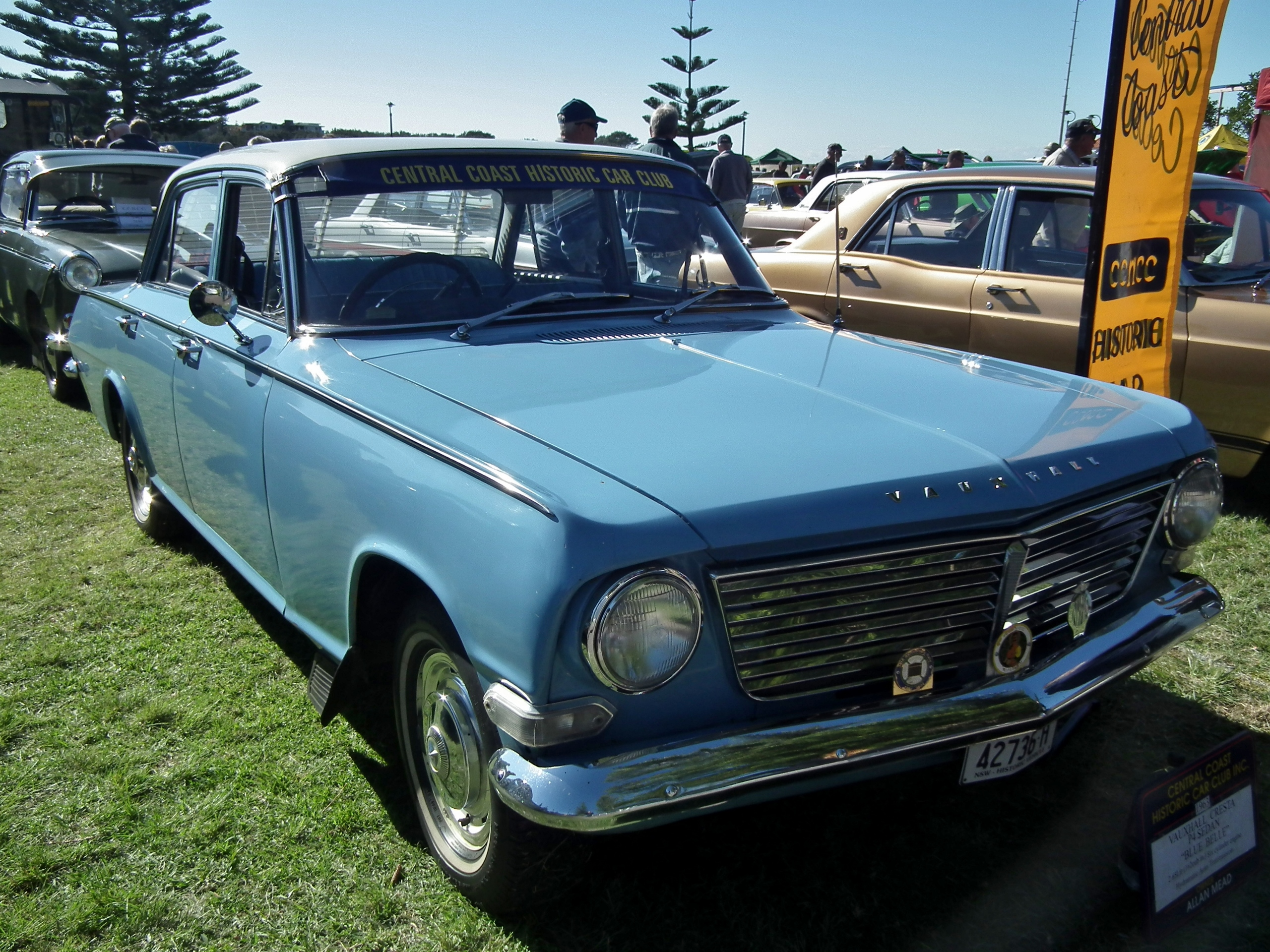
Vauxhall Cresta PB Saloon (pre-facelift)

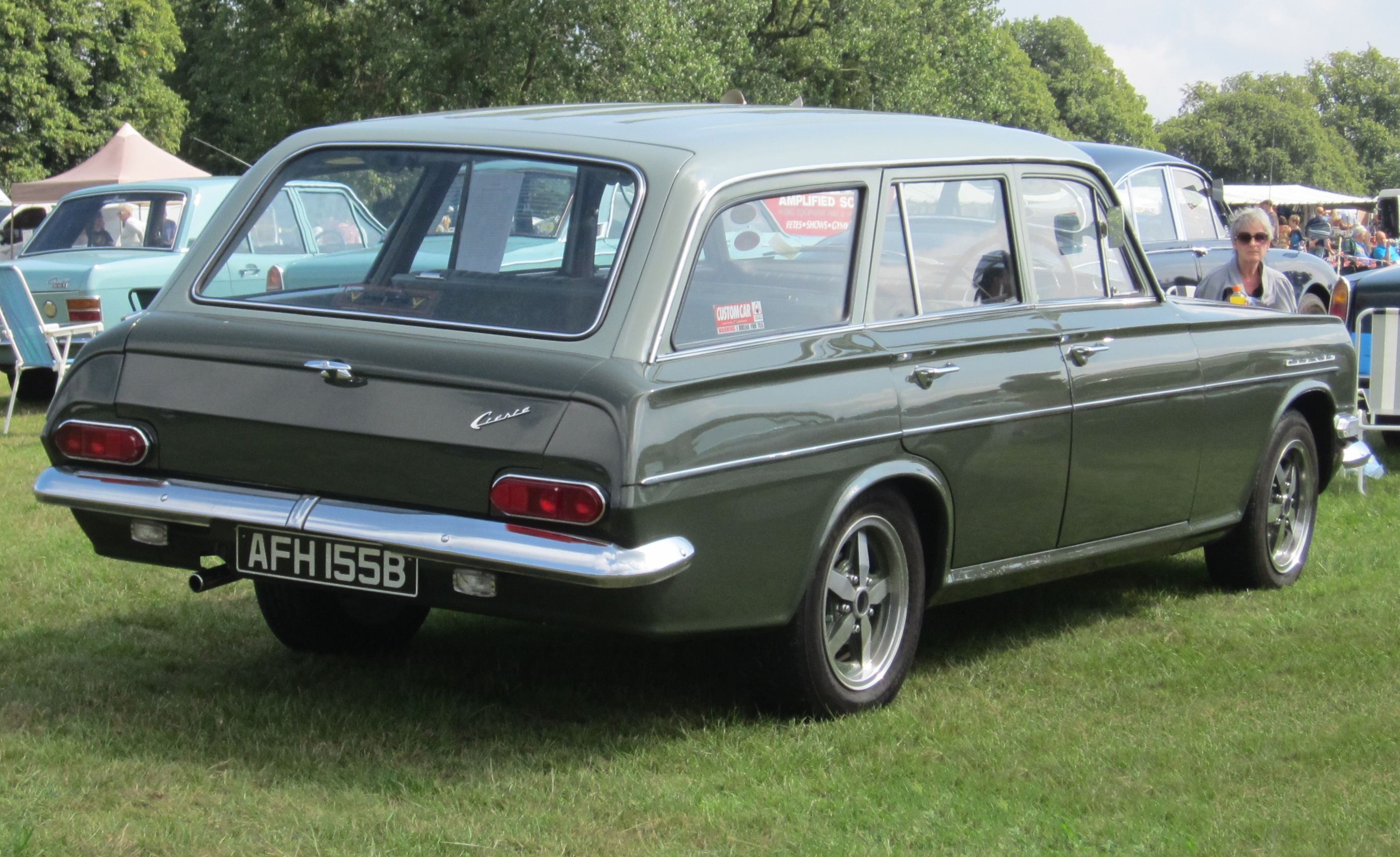
Vauxhall Cresta PB Estate Car (with non-standard wheels)

== Cresta PC ==
Vauxhall Cresta PC
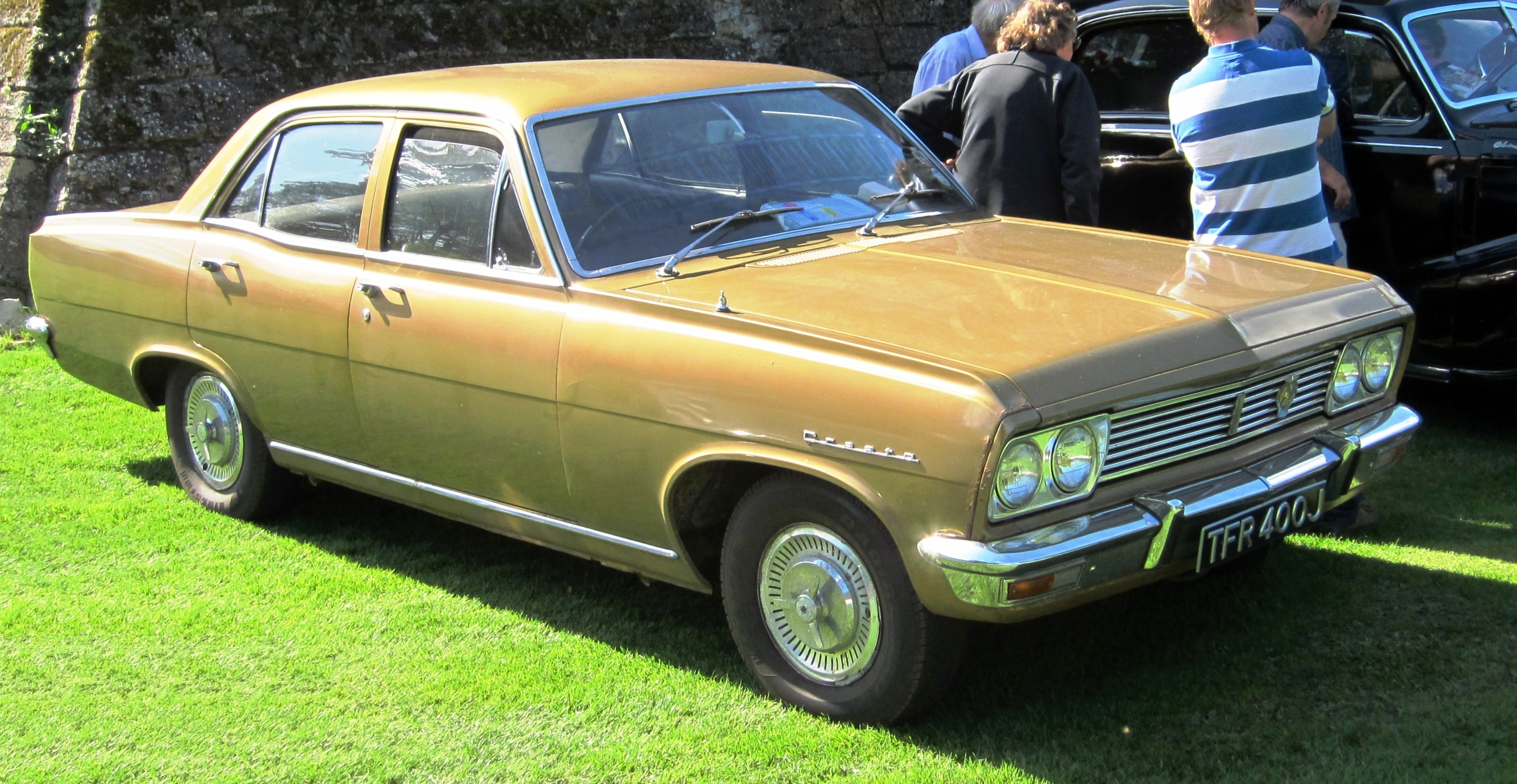

Overview
- Production: 1965–1972; 53,912 made
- Designer: David Jones

Body and chassis
- Body style: 4-door saloon 5-door estate car (Martin Walter)

Powertrain
- Engine: 2,651 cc PC40 OHV I6 (export only); 3,294 cc PC51 OHV I6
- Transmission: 3- or 4-speed manual 2- or 3-speed automatic

Dimensions
- Wheelbase: 107.5 in (2,730 mm)
- Length: 185.5 in (4,710 mm) (saloon); 187 in (4,700 mm) (estate)
- Width: 69.8 in (1,770 mm)
- Height: 55.6 in (1,410 mm) (saloon); 59 in (1,500 mm) (estate)
- Curb weight: 2,796 lb (1,268 kg) (standard)

Chronology
- Predecessor: Vauxhall Velox (PB)

The last of the series, the PC, was introduced for the London Motor Show in October 1965. No longer offered as a lower specification Velox version, it was designated PCS (standard), PCD (De Luxe) and PCE (Executive), this last model having its own name, 'Viscount'. It was a different car, larger and styled with the coke-bottle look that would also be seen in the FD Victor series: it now resembled a slightly smaller Chevrolet Impala and also the second generation Opel Kapitan/Diplomat, although it had no engineering commonality with either. It was similar to the Australian Holden HR, but larger and better trimmed, and featured the 3.3-litre straight-six engine with 140 hp SAE gross (104 kW; 142 PS) at 4,800 rpm for its entire seven-year production run. This engine was rated 123 hp SAE net (92 kW) while the DIN rating is 123.5 PS (91 kW); both net ratings are at an engine speed of 4,600 rpm. A low compression version, 7.0 rather than 8.5:1, was also available for certain export markets. For the first three model years, the 2.6-litre engine with 115 PS SAE (85 kW) was offered in export markets where smaller engines were more marketable; mostly in continental Europe. Though a small-block V8 would have dropped straight in, this option was never offered. Initially, the three-speed column-shift manual transmission was standard with optional overdrive; four-speed manual and two-speed Powerglide were also optional. Later cars, from about 1971, came with four-speed manual or three-speed automatic, both with floor shift though the base Cresta continued with a bench front seat. The De Luxe version had four headlamps instead of the two fitted on the (much rarer) base models though the very last base Crestas also had four headlamps.

General Motors Holden assembly of the Cresta ended with the pre-facelift 2.6-litre PB in 1965, therefore the PC Cresta was not sold in Australia.

General Motors New Zealand ran its own assembly line in Petone (1966–67) and Trentham, near Wellington, to 1971. The Cresta had been built at Petone from 1955 to 1960 and then, until 1966, Cresta was fully imported from Britain in very small numbers. From 1966 the Petone plant began locally assembly of the PC Cresta. The 'base' Cresta model built changed very little during that time and did not receive the facelift that appeared on the UK market late in 1970 as the 1971 model. The only option was the two-speed Powerglide. However, in 1970 the brake system was upgraded to a tandem master cylinder to improve the braking, becoming standard fitment on the New Zealand models. A few twin-headlamp Cresta De Luxe, Viscount, and estate car versions were also imported, built-up, from the UK.

The facelifted model, never offered in New Zealand, had twin headlamps as standard and a more integrated dash panel. Floor shift, rather than column change, was also standard.

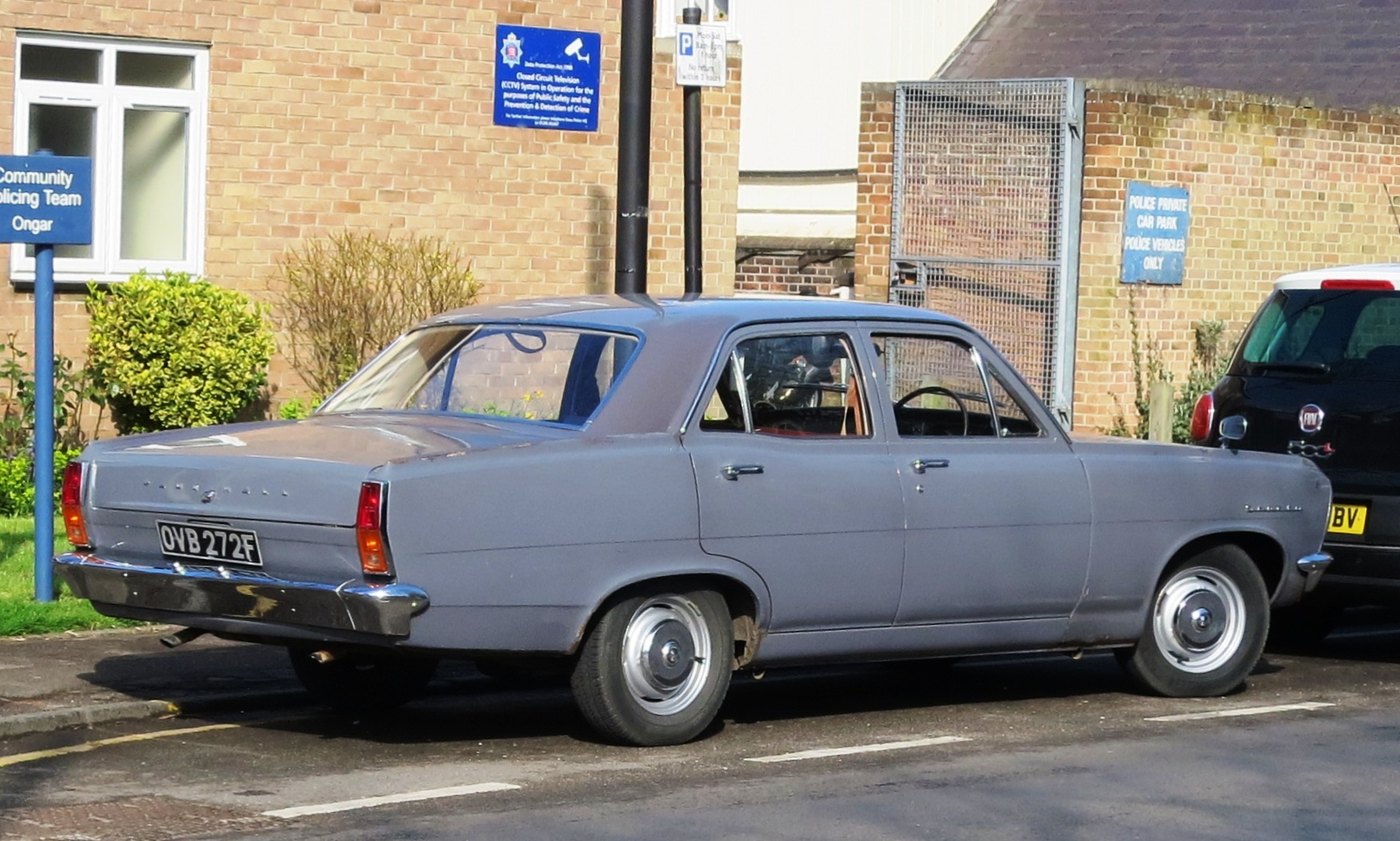
Vauxhall Cresta PC from behind)

In January 1967 domestic market deliveries began of the Vauxhall Cresta estate car. This vehicle resulted from a conversion by Martin Walter of Folkestone, a firm better known for their (primarily Bedford based) Dormobile motorhome conversions. The estate version was 2 1/2 inches (6.4 cm) higher than the saloon due to a combination of heavy-duty rear suspension, an increase in the outer diameter of the tyres (to 7.00–14 in from 5.90-14in) and the modified roof line. The Cresta estate was initially offered in the UK at £1,507, which represented a price premium of around 40% over the equivalent saloon. The long established Humber Hawk estate and recently introduced Ford Zephyr estate carried UK sales prices of £1,342 and £1,379 respectively. The Cresta estate offered a load platform length of 47 inches (120 cm) which increased to an impressive 76 inches (190 cm) when the back seat was folded down, but Vauxhall's contender was never priced to be a big seller and the last estate cars were made in 1968.

== Viscount ==
Vauxhall Viscount
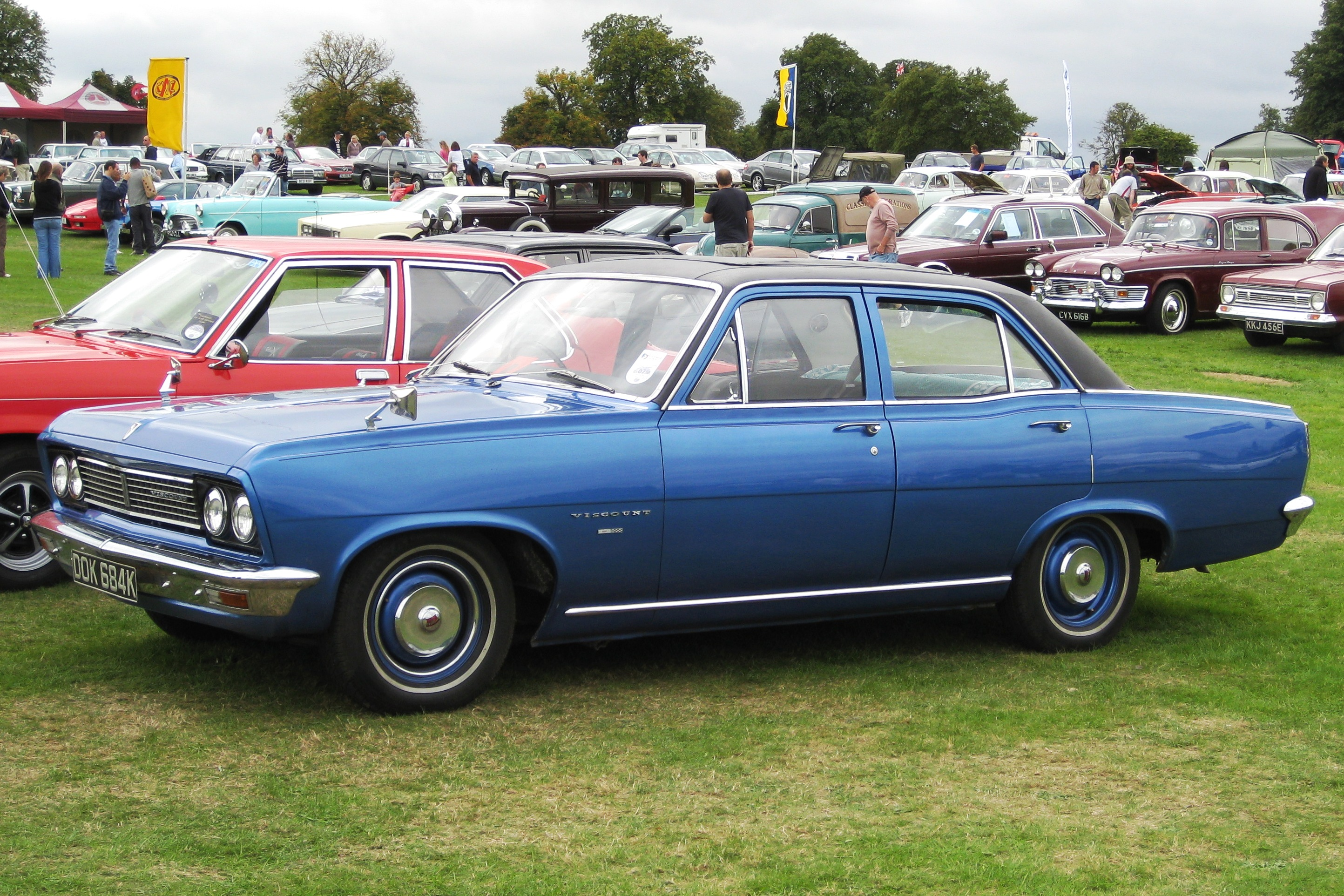

Overview
- Production: 1966–1972; 7,025 made

Body and chassis
- Body style: 4-door saloon

Powertrain
- Engine: 3,294 cc PC51 OHV I6
- Transmission: 4-speed manual 2 or 3-speed automatic

Dimensions
- Wheelbase: 107.5 in (2,730 mm)
- Length: 188.6 in (4,790 mm)
- Width: 69.8 in (1,770 mm)
- Height: 56.0 in (1,420 mm)
- Curb weight: 3,071 lb (1,393 kg)

Introduced early in June 1966, with the same engine and mechanical components as the Cresta PC, the Viscount was the "executive" version of it (hence the PCE model code). It was supplied as standard with power steering, electric windows, reclining seats, a vinyl roof, walnut dashboard, inertia reel seat belts front, and even a heated rear window. Areas of the grille and headlamp surrounds were blacked out to give a classier look and the tail-lights had a chrome overlay. The dark green, blue or maroon paintwork featured simulated, hand painted coachlines, along each flank, to give the car a coachpainted appearance. The outer pair of the quad, five-inch, sealed beam headlamps were twin filament, giving the car four main beams. The Viscount also came with wider tyres and rims than the Cresta (7.00-14in on 5" rims rather than 5.90-14in on 4.5" rims). All PC 3.3 had twin tail-pipes. The standard transmission option was GM's Powerglide two-speed automatic, but a four-speed manual gearbox was available, initially on the UK market at a saving of £85: elsewhere the manual gear box was a no-cost option. In the third quarter of 1970 the two-speed Powerglide automatic was replaced with a GM three-speed automatic transmission.

The British version of the Vauxhall Viscount automatic with the two-speed Powerglide transmission was road tested by Motor in September 1966. A maximum (best) top speed of 100 mph (161 km/h) was recorded with 0–60 mph in 14.5 seconds and a standing quarter-mile in 20.3 seconds. Overall mpg was 15.6. The later automatic Viscount model, with the three-speed Strasbourg GM transmission, ought to have improved on these acceleration figures, especially at the lower speeds.

== Discontinuation ==
Production ended in 1972 with no direct replacement – mirroring an industry trend as mainstream manufacturers exited the upper E- and F-segments – although the Cresta engine continued to be used in the slightly smaller Vauxhall Ventora (the new flagship of the Vauxhall range) until 1978.

Vauxhall's GM sister company Opel continued to field an entry in the full-size luxury segment in the form of its Admiral/Diplomat twins until these were also axed in 1977. Ultimately a jointly developed model in the form of the Opel Senator (Vauxhall Royale) would become the flagship for both Vauxhall and Opel from the late 70s onward.

== Use by British Royalty ==
In the 1950s and 1960s Queen Elizabeth II used a bespoke PA Friary Estate, and later a PC version of the Cresta as personal transport. The Queen's PA Friary estate forms part of The Royal Car Collection at the Sandringham Exhibition & Transport Museum.
