= Opel Diplomat =

Full-size German automobile model

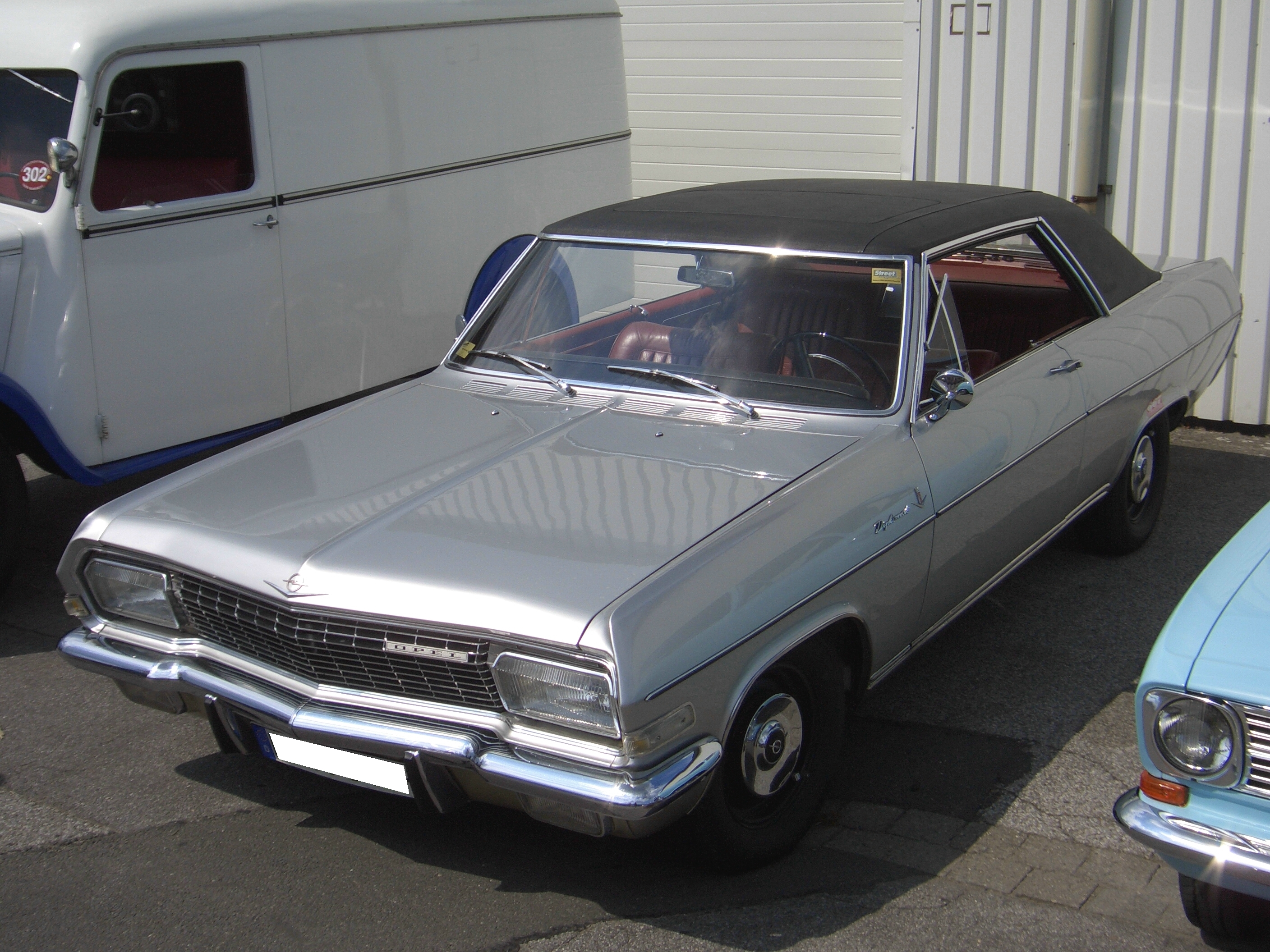
- The 2-door Opel Diplomat Coupé was very rare

Overview
- Manufacturer: Opel
- Production: 1964–1977

Body and chassis
- Class: Full-size luxury car
- Layout: FR layout

Chronology
- Predecessor: Opel Kapitän
- Successor: Opel Senator

The Opel Diplomat is a luxury car manufactured by Opel from 1964 to 1977. Opel's top-ranging models were traditionally the Admiral and Kapitän, introduced in 1938 and 1937 respectively.

In 1964 these models were joined, in the so-called "KAD" (Kapitän, Admiral, Diplomat) range, by the new Opel Diplomat. In most respects the three were badge-engineered versions of the same vehicle.

== Diplomat A (1964–1968) ==
Diplomat A
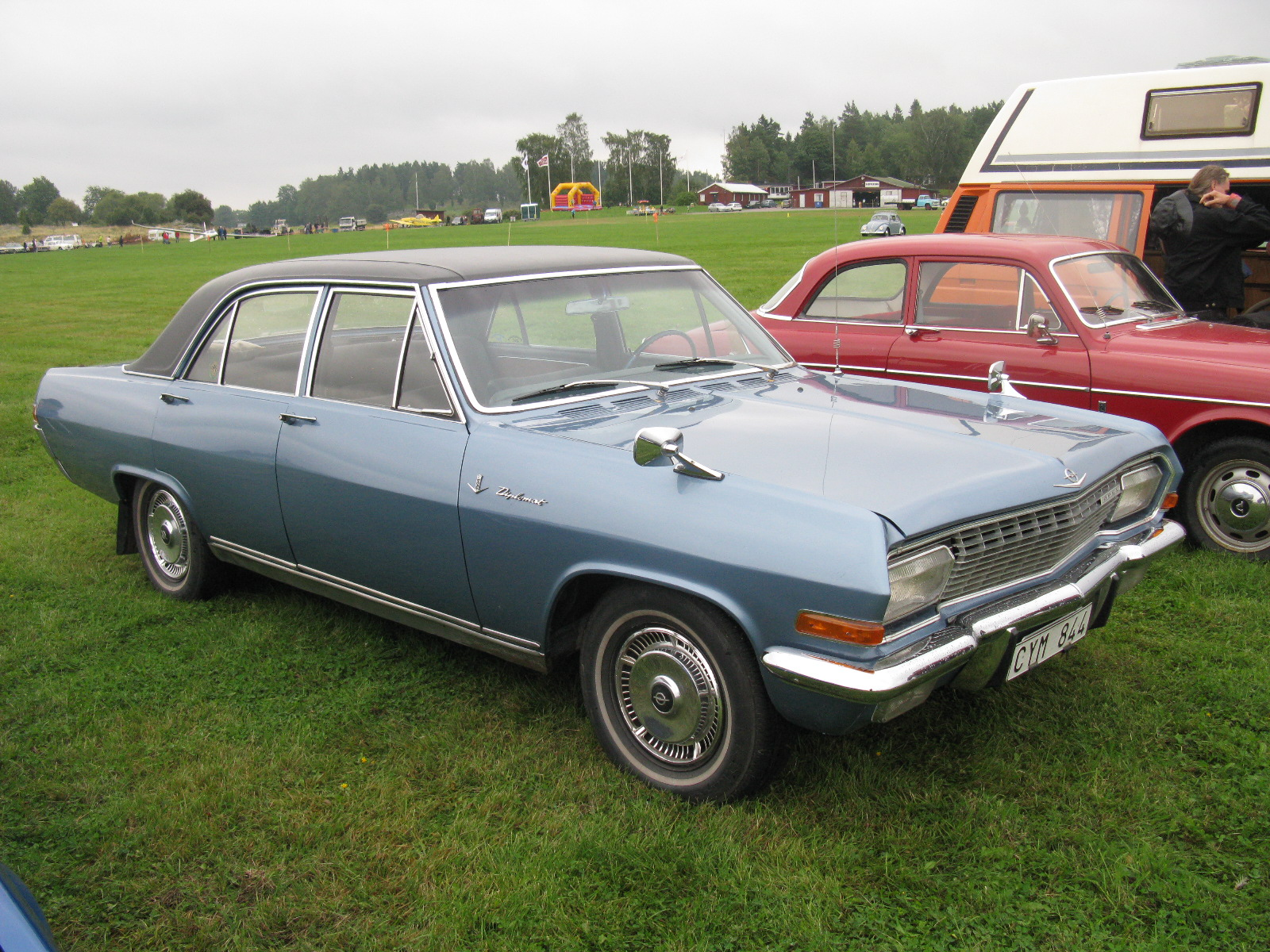

Overview
- Production: 1964–1968
- Designer: Clare MacKichan

Powertrain
- Engine: 2.6 L OHV I6; 2.8 L CIH I6; 4.6 L Chevrolet V8; 5.4 L Chevrolet V8
- Transmission: 2-speed Powerglide automatic

Dimensions
- Wheelbase: 2,845 mm (112.0 in)
- Length: 4,948 mm (194.8 in)
- Width: 1,902 mm (74.9 in)
- Height: 1,445 mm (56.9 in)
- Curb weight: 1,380–1,630 kg (3,040–3,590 lb)

In February 1964 Opel introduced a new range of flagship models as successors to the Opel Kapitän P-LV of 1959/1963. These KAD models (Opel Kapitän, Admiral and Diplomat; also referred to as "The Big Three" by Opel) were available with 2.6-litre and 2.8-litre in-line six-cylinder petrol engines (100 or 125 PS), or a V8-Chevrolet small-block engine 283 (4.6-litre) teamed with a two-speed Powerglide automatic transmission 190 PS (140 kW). The latter engine was supplanted in the saloon by the 5.4-litre Chevrolet small-block "327" V8 with 230 PS (169 kW) in October 1966. As the company's range-topping model, the Diplomat was available only with the V-8.

A Diplomat Coupé, with the 327 engine only, was also available from 1965 to 1967 in limited numbers. The coupé was built by coachbuilder Karmann and cost DM 25,500 (as much as seven Volkswagen Beetles). 347 Coupés were built. In styling, the Coupe has more than a passing resemblance to the 1965 Chevrolet Chevelle Malibu Sport Coupe.

In September 1967 the Diplomat and its less expensive siblings received a light update consisting of rub strips on its flanks, new recirculating ball steering by ZF, and a heated rear window. At the same time, a HL (Hochleistung or high performance) version of the 2.8-litre six with 140 PS (103 kW) became available for the Kapitän and Admiral models.

These cars were even larger than their predecessors, stretching to almost 200 inches, and found little favour with the European public. Between February 1964 and November 1968, Opel built 89,277 KAD models (24,249 Kapitäns, 55,876 Admirals and 9,152 Diplomats), whereas its direct predecessor, the Kapitän P-LV, had registered 145,618 sales over a comparable four-year span.

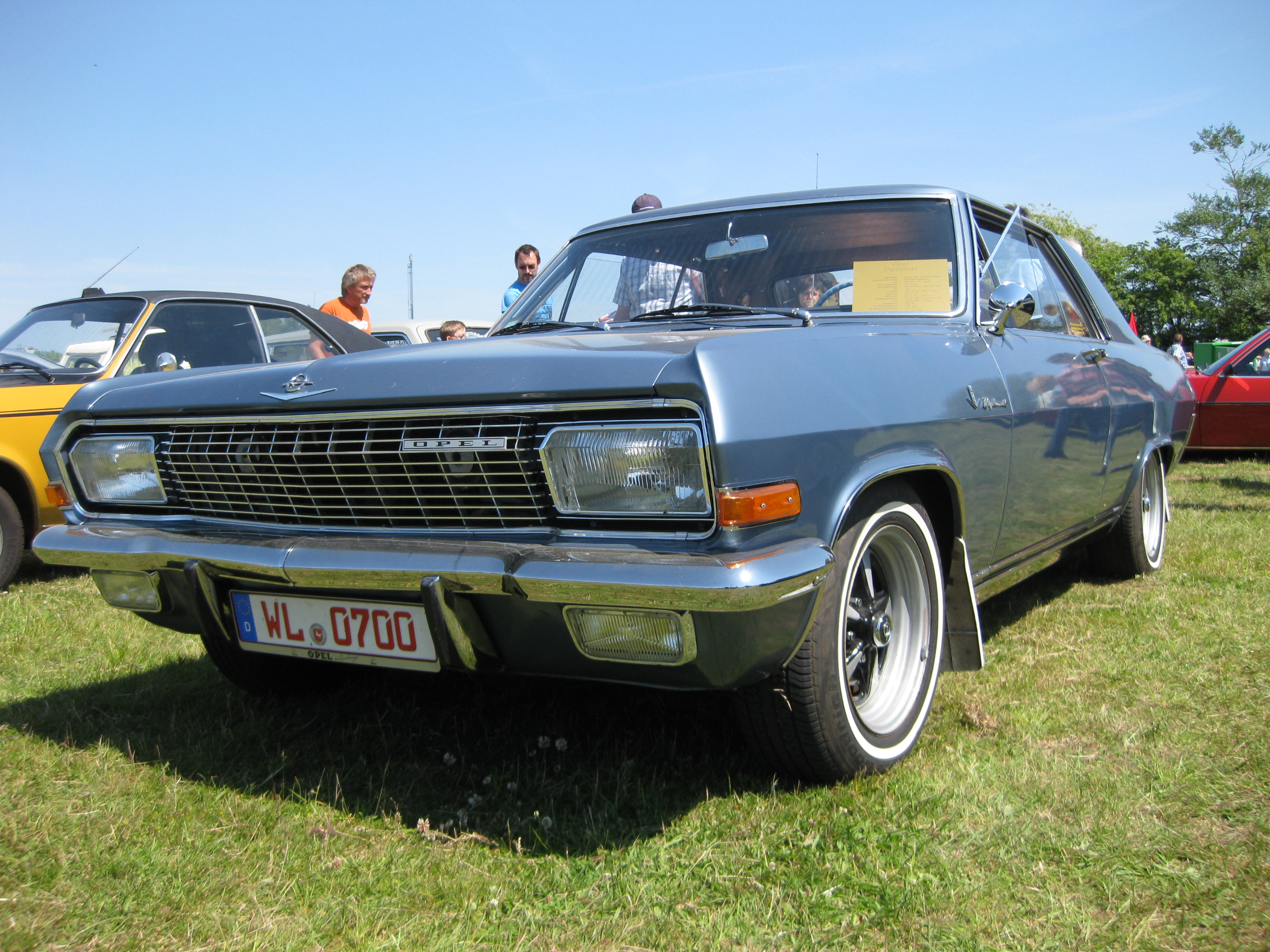
Opel Diplomat Coupe

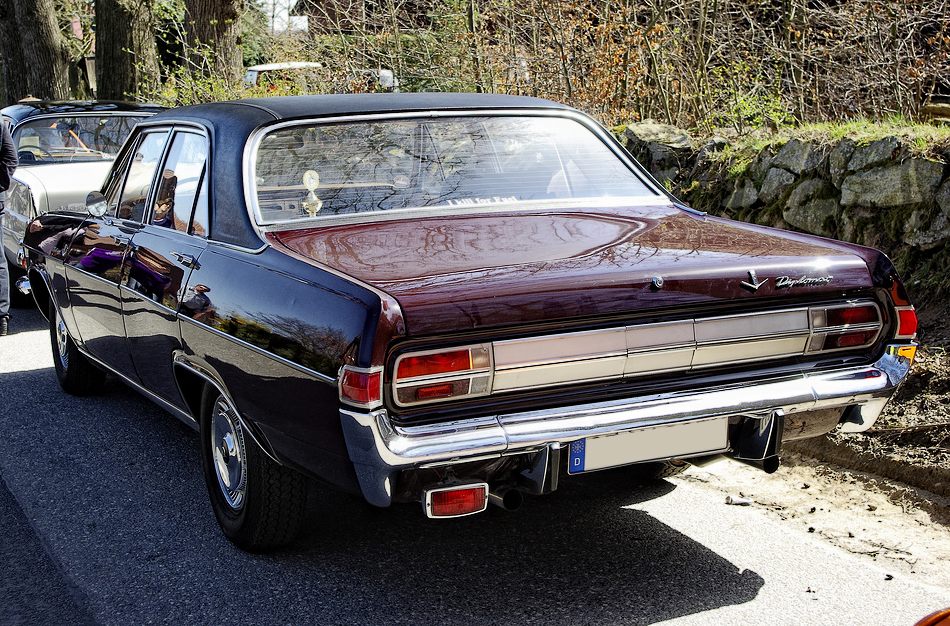
Rear view

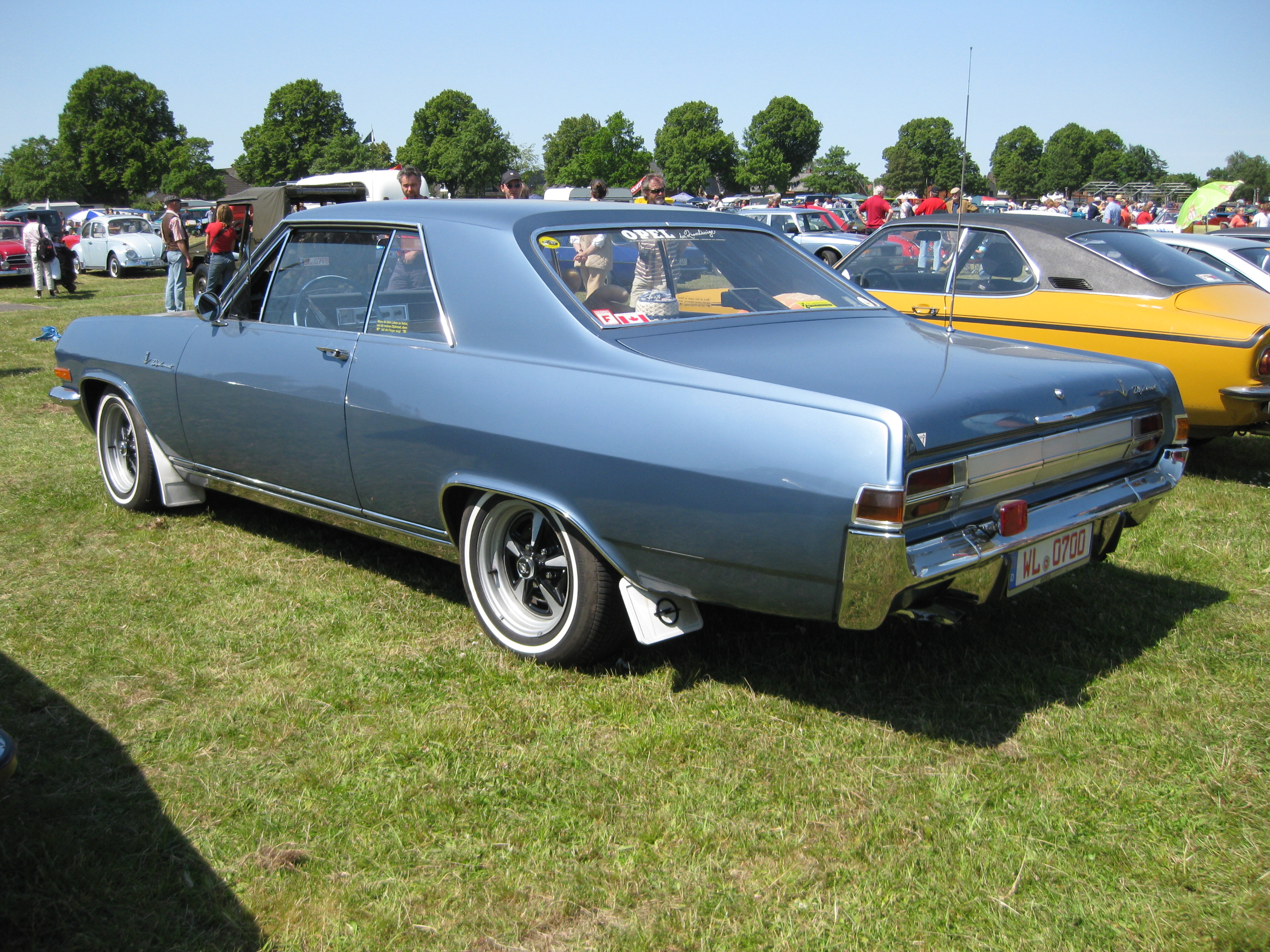
Opel Diplomat V8 Coupé

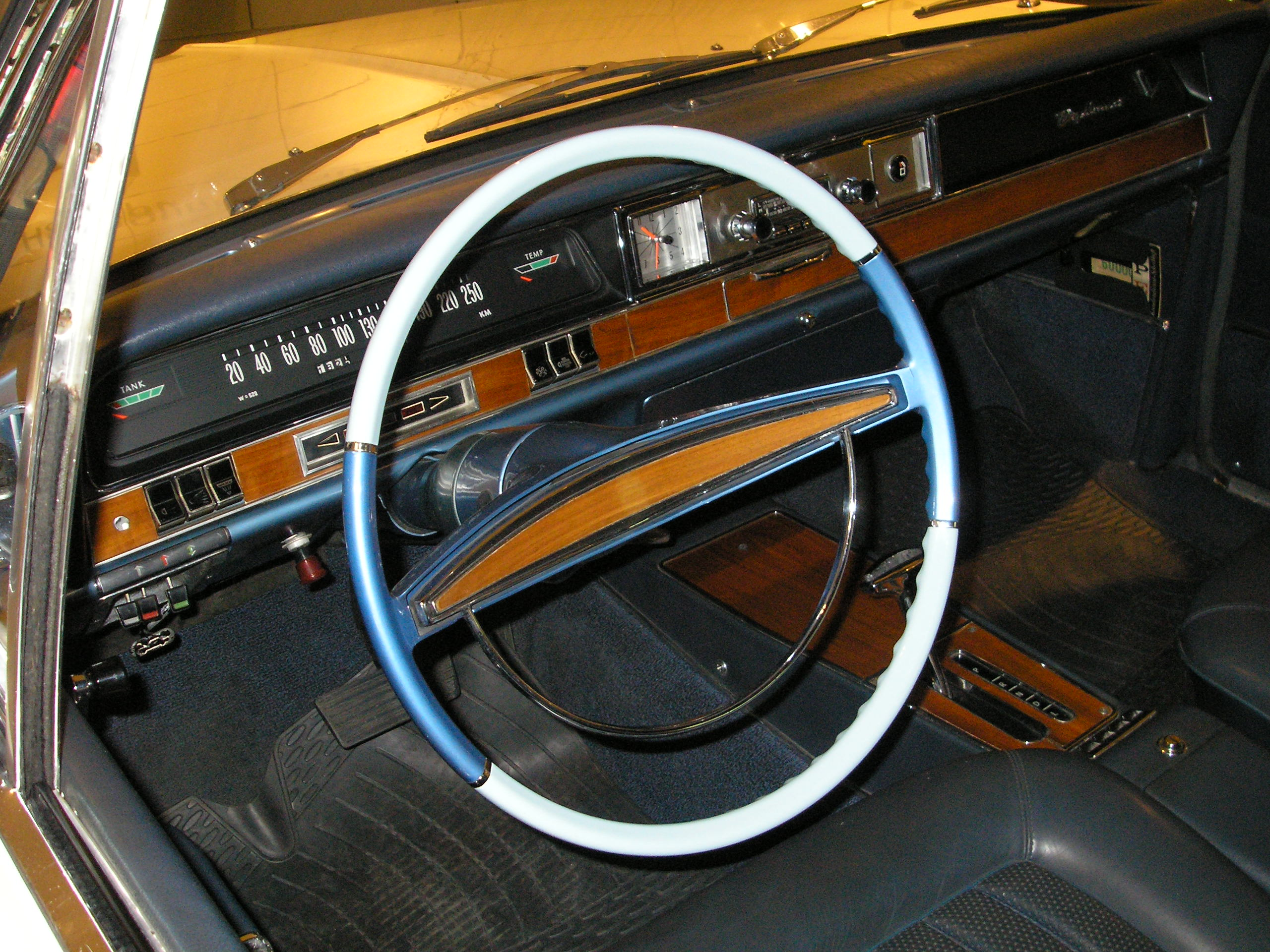
Dashboard Diplomat A

== Diplomat B (1969–1977) ==
Diplomat B
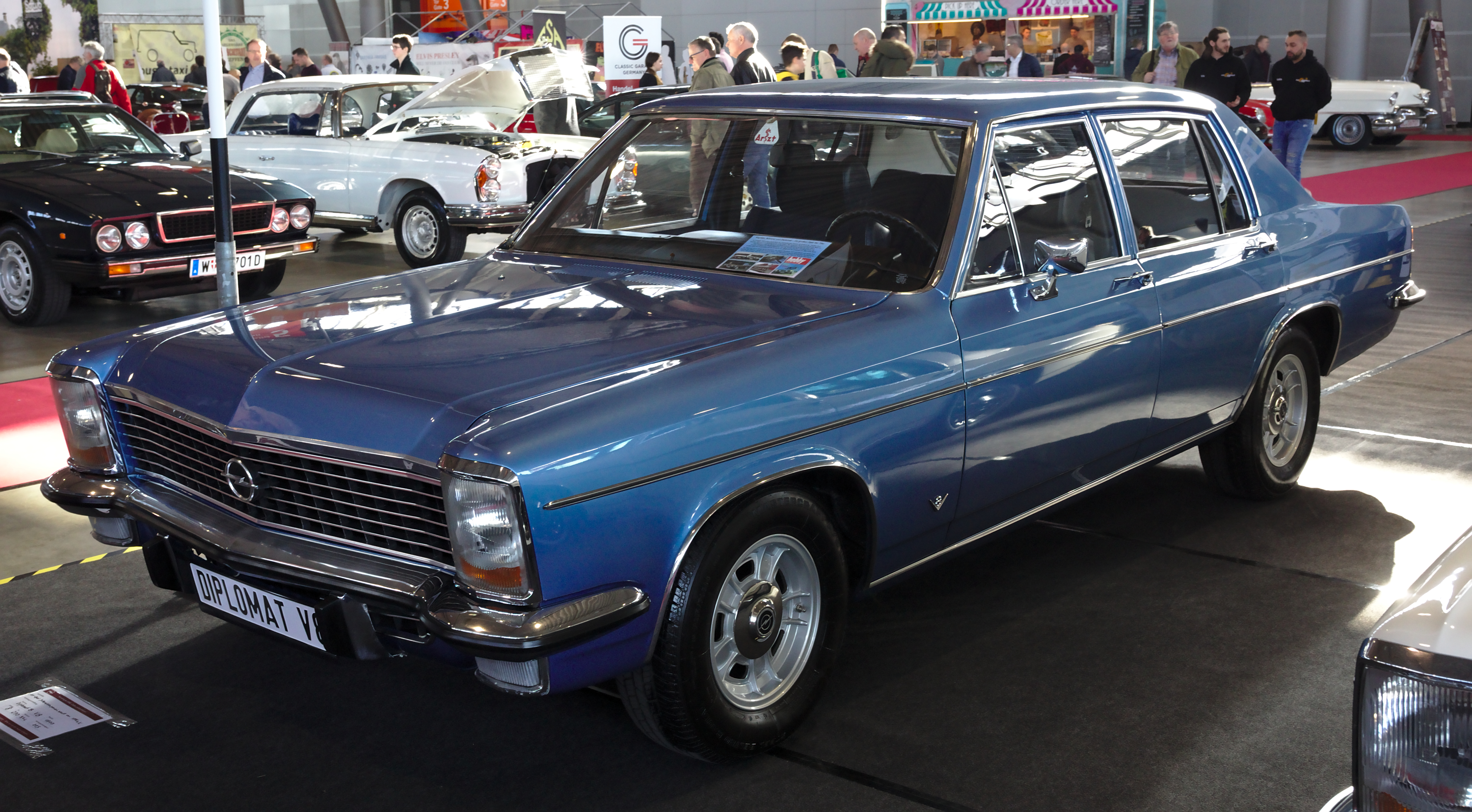
- 1977 Opel Diplomat B V8

Overview
- Production: 1969–1977

Powertrain
- Engine: 2.8 L CIH I6; 5.4 L 54S V8
- Transmission: 4-speed manual; 3-speed automatic (I6); 3-speed TH-400 Turbo-Hydramatic automatic (V8)

Dimensions
- Wheelbase: 2,845–2,995 mm (112.0–117.9 in)
- Length: 4,920–5,070 mm (193.7–199.6 in)
- Width: 1,852 mm (72.9 in)
- Height: 1,450 mm (57.1 in)
- Curb weight: 1,530–1,720 kg (3,370–3,790 lb)

In March 1969, Opel introduced a new line of KAD models with new bodies and a more sophisticated chassis with a De Dion tube rear axle. These cars were slightly smaller than their predecessors. While the lesser models (Opel Kapitän and Admiral) were also available with a carburetted 2.8 L-inline six, the Diplomat could be had with either a fuel-injected version of this engine (Diplomat E) or with Chevrolet's 327-V8 (Diplomat V8), now coupled to a 3-speed TH-400 Turbo-Hydramatic.

The new body was a typical General Motors style and bore a strong resemblance to the contemporary Holden Brougham from GM Australia. The Diplomat was never produced in right-hand drive for the British market, nor was there any equivalent Vauxhall version.

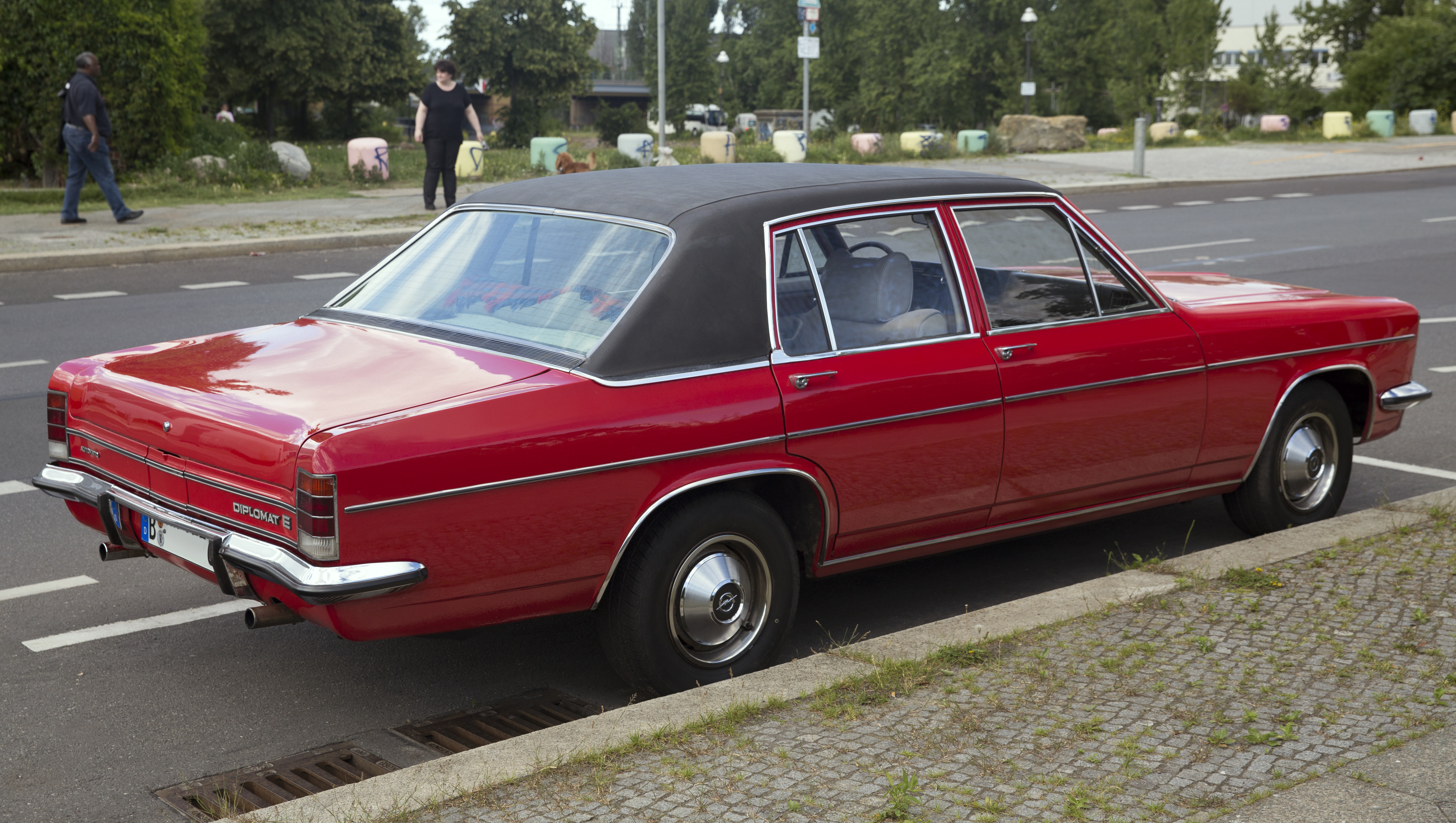
Rear view of Opel Diplomat E automatic

The Diplomat V-8 was hoped to compete with Mercedes' new 350 and 450 SE; from May 1973 Opel even offered a long-wheelbase version of the V-8 to keep up with Mercedes' SEL models. In October 1971 the Diplomat's list of standard features included H1 halogen headlamps, radio antenna integrated into the windscreen and remote-controlled rear view mirror. From January 1972 the 4-speed manual gear box was no longer offered on the Diplomat E. September 1972 saw the introduction of a modified grille with OPEL script relocated from its left side to its central portion. A number of the 'lesser' Admiral cars had their car boot lid fitted with Diplomat lettering/badges. This led to some confusion by today's car buyers, even in the TV series Der letzte Bulle (German), but the cars are easily identified by their vertical headlights for the Diplomat versus horizontal ones for the Admiral.

Opel continued the production until 1977 but found little success in the market, as it was competing against established premium brands in its domestic market such as Mercedes-Benz, BMW and Auto Union-NSU (later Audi), and as a consequence only 61,559 KAD cars were built from March 1969 to late 1977 (of which 4,976 Kapitäns, about 33,000 Admirals and about 23,500 Diplomats). Opel's British sister company Vauxhall had already abandoned the large executive segment when it discontinued its own Cresta/Viscount model in 1972. A joint model programme between the two marques saw the Diplomat superseded in 1978 by the new Senator/Monza/Royale (of a somewhat reduced size - being based on a stretched version of the Rekord E - and featuring more modern, European styling, that would act as the flagship for both GM's European brands).

In the early 1970s GM considered the use of Opel Diplomat as the basis of forthcoming first generation Cadillac Seville. But the precise panel gap tolerance found in Diplomat was beyond what the GM North American manufacturing plants could do without extensive and expensive changes to the sheetmetal stamping and welding process.

The Diplomat V8 served as the technical base for the Bitter CD, a limited-production GT based on the design of an earlier Opel concept shown in 1969. The production of the handbuilt German car used the chassis, drivetrain, mechanicals, and dashboard of the Diplomat. Production of the CD came to an end in the early eighties, when the Diplomat chassis was no longer available to buy from Opel.

The 'Diplomat' name was resurrected in the early 1990s by both Opel and Vauxhall as an upscale trim level on both the Vectra A/Cavalier and Omega A/Carlton – positioned above the traditional 'CD' luxury trim level. 'Diplomat' has also made sporadic appearances as a special edition name on Opel/Vauxhall cars over the decades since.

In Brazil, the name 'Diplomata' (Diplomat in Portuguese) was used from 1980 to 1992 for the luxury version of the locally built Rekord C Chevrolet Opala.
