= Opel Admiral =

German-made luxury car

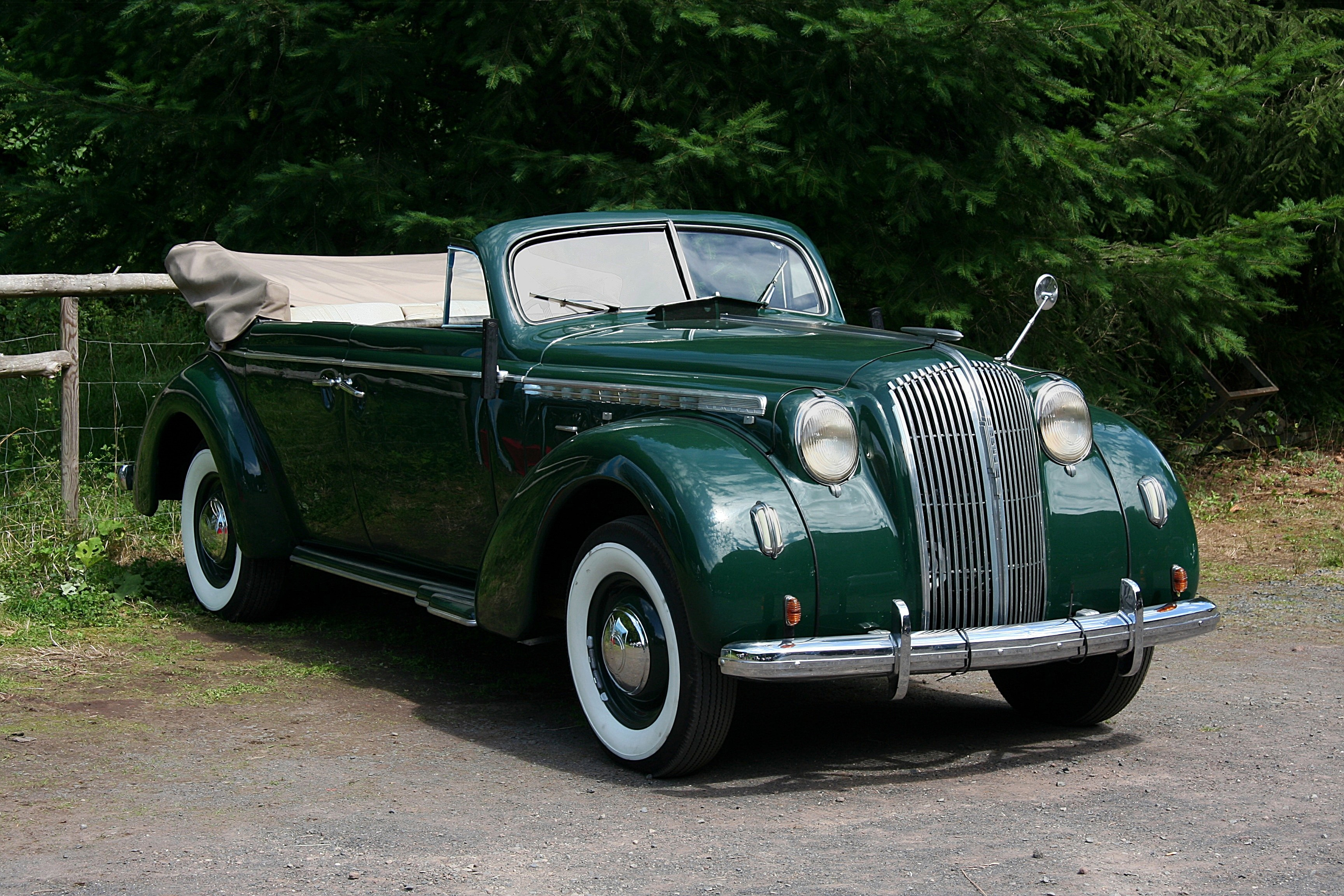
- A first generation Opel Admiral convertible

Overview
- Manufacturer: Opel (General Motors)
- Production: 1937–1939; 1964–1977

Body and chassis
- Class: Full-size luxury car (F-segment)

Chronology
- Successor: Opel Senator

The Opel Admiral is a luxury car made by the German car manufacturer Opel from 1937 until 1939 and again from 1964 until 1977.

== Admiral (1937–1939) ==
Opel Admiral
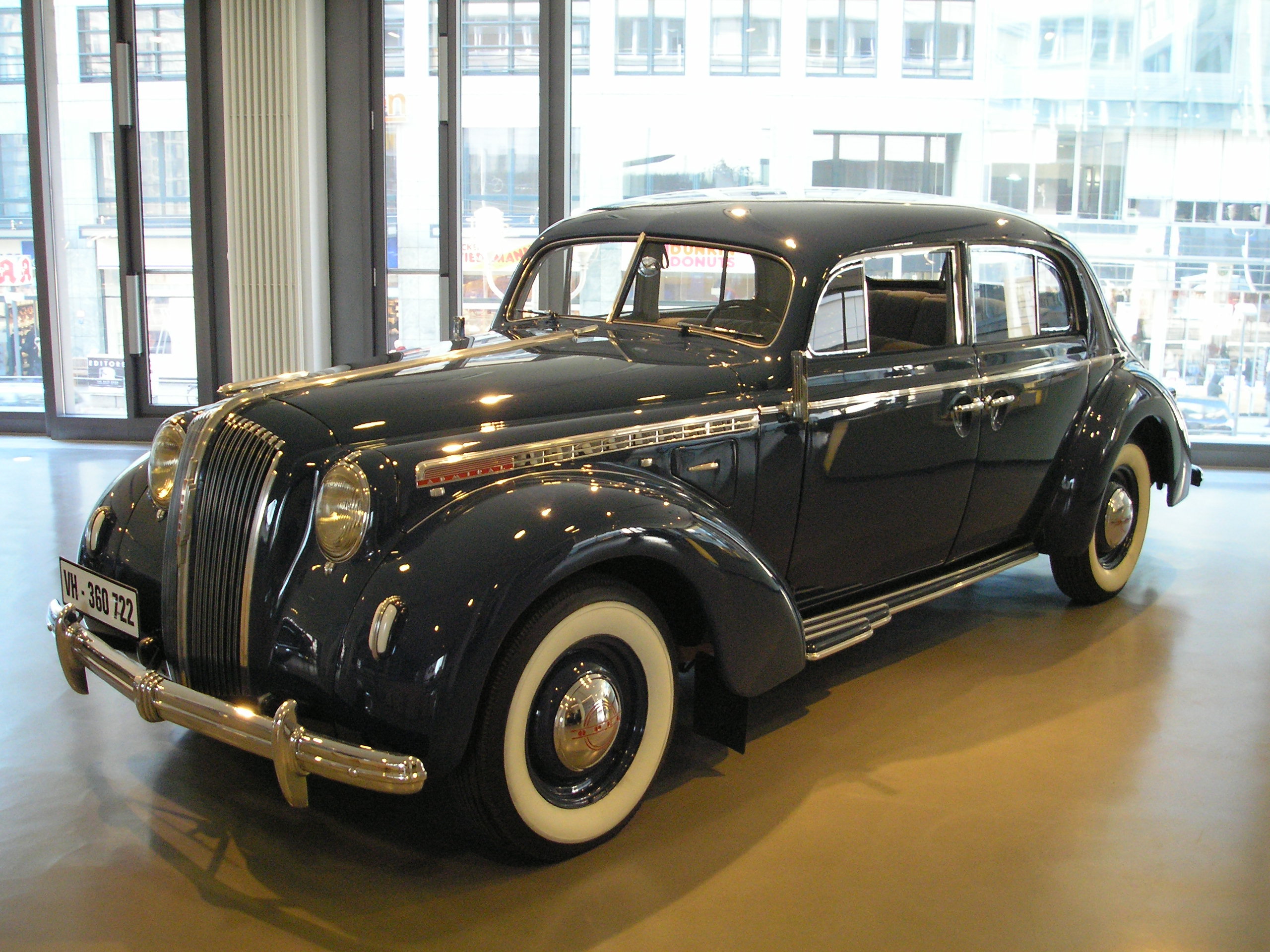
- 1938 Opel Admiral

Overview
- Manufacturer: Opel
- Production: 1937–1939; 6,404 cars

Body and chassis
- Class: Luxury car
- Body style: 4-door sedan 4-door cabriolet
- Layout: FR layout

Powertrain
- Engine: 3.6 L OHV I6

Dimensions
- Wheelbase: 3,155 mm (124 in)
- Length: 5,270 mm (207.5 in)
- Width: 1,800 mm (70.9 in)
- Height: 1,710 mm (67.3 in) (sedan/saloon); 1,630 mm (64.2 in) (cabriolet)
- Curb weight: 1,605 kg (3,538 lb)

The first Admiral was introduced at the Berlin Motor Show in early 1937, although production did not begin until the end of the year, with only eight units produced in 1937. The model was an attempt to challenge luxury cars in the growing 3.5-litre class from Horch, Mercedes-Benz and Maybach. However, it came with a substantially lower price than the similarly sized and powered cars from these premium manufacturers, which combined with its generously proportioned but technically straightforward chassis to make it a favorite with builders of specialist car bodies. Unlike the slightly smaller unitary bodied Opel Kapitän introduced at the end of 1938, the Admiral used a traditional separate chassis. It turned up with several different bespoke cabriolet and limousine bodies, and also provided the chassis, engine and running gear for various substantial ambulances.

=== Engines ===
The car was powered by a newly developed 3,626 cc straight-six engine for which a maximum output of 75 PS (55 kW; 74 hp) was quoted, along with a claimed top speed for the standard bodied cars of 132 km/h (82 mph). The engine was shared with the 3.5-ton Opel Blitz truck produced at the manufacturer's recently opened commercial vehicle plant at Brandenburg an der Havel southwest of Berlin, and similar enough to the Chevrolet and Vauxhall/Bedford straight-sixes of the time that many service parts interchanged – something that was discovered when the Germans and Allies captured each other's vehicles during World War II.

=== Bodies ===
The basic Admiral was offered as a four-door "Limousine" (sedan/saloon) with a manufacturer's listed price of 6,500 Reichsmark which was considered very competitive. There was also a four-door cabriolet listed at 7,000 Reichsmark. Customers wishing to spend more money for more style could choose a 2+2-seater cabriolet bodied Admiral from the coach builder Hebmüller of Wuppertal, listed at 8,450 Marks. Hebmüller also offered an imposing six-seater "Pullman-Limousine" bodied Admiral with a lengthened passenger cabin (in return for a shortened luggage locker) listed at 8,580 Marks. Other coach-built versions included a 2+2 seater cabriolet bodied by Gläser of Dresden, a car described by one commentator as "dignified".

The Admiral's front end was similar to the American revolutionary DeSoto Airflow, incorporating a sloping grille and body-embodied headlights.

=== Commercial ===
The Admiral's introduction coincided with Germany’s first Autobahn construction boom. Its 70-litre fuel tank allowed for a range between refuelling stops of nearly 400 km (250 miles) despite the car consuming fuel at the rate of 18 L/100 km (16 mpg_{‑imp}; 13 mpg_{‑US}). The Admiral could be presented as a comfortable and rapid autobahn cruiser.

Between 1937 and 1939, Opel produced 6,404 Admirals, split between 3,500 "Limousine"-bodied, four-door saloons, 2,314 four-door cabriolets, and 590 bare chassis supplied for completion to independent coach builders. By one reckoning, the Admiral had captured approximately a quarter of the German luxury car market.

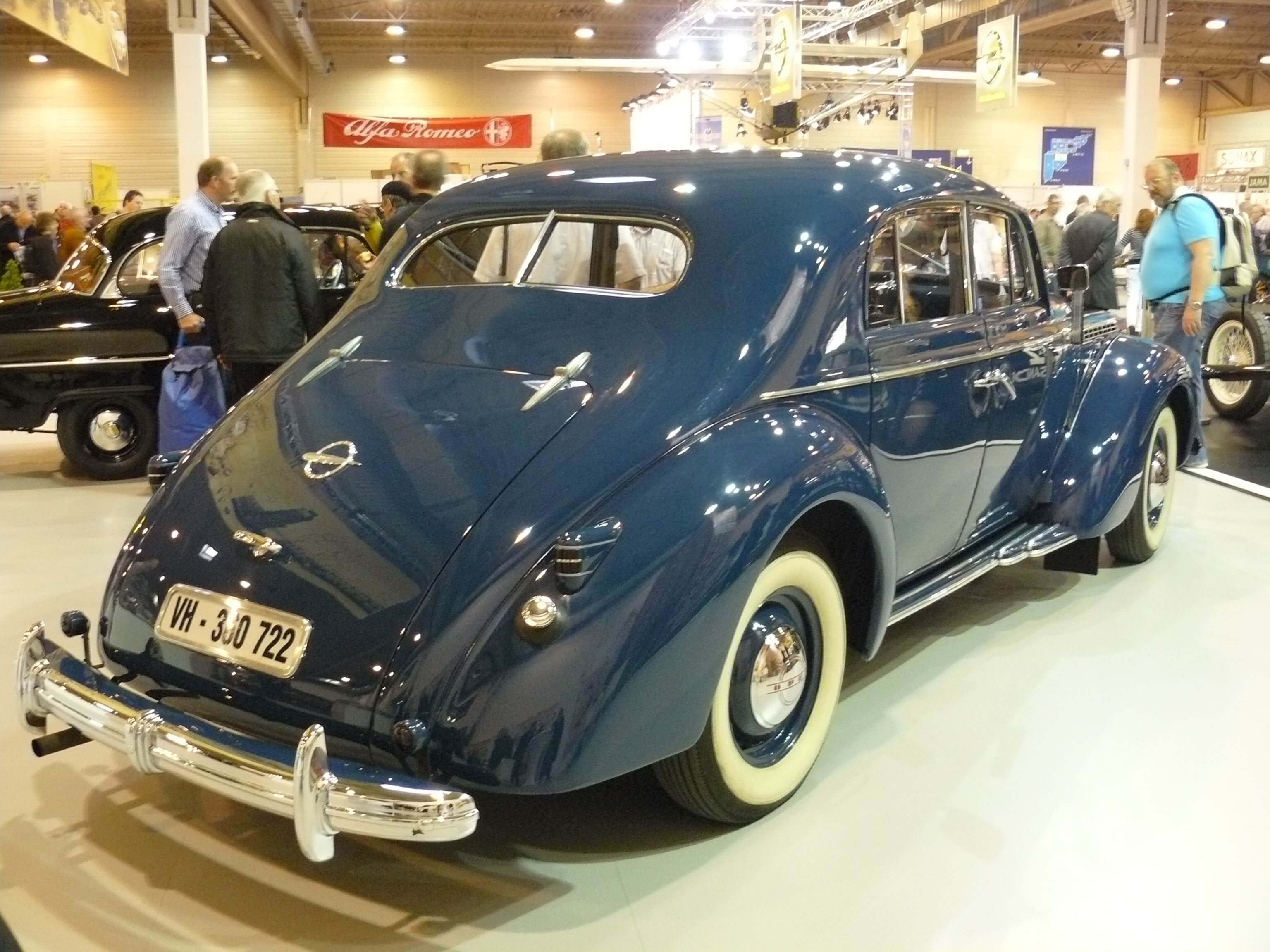
1938 Admiral, rear view

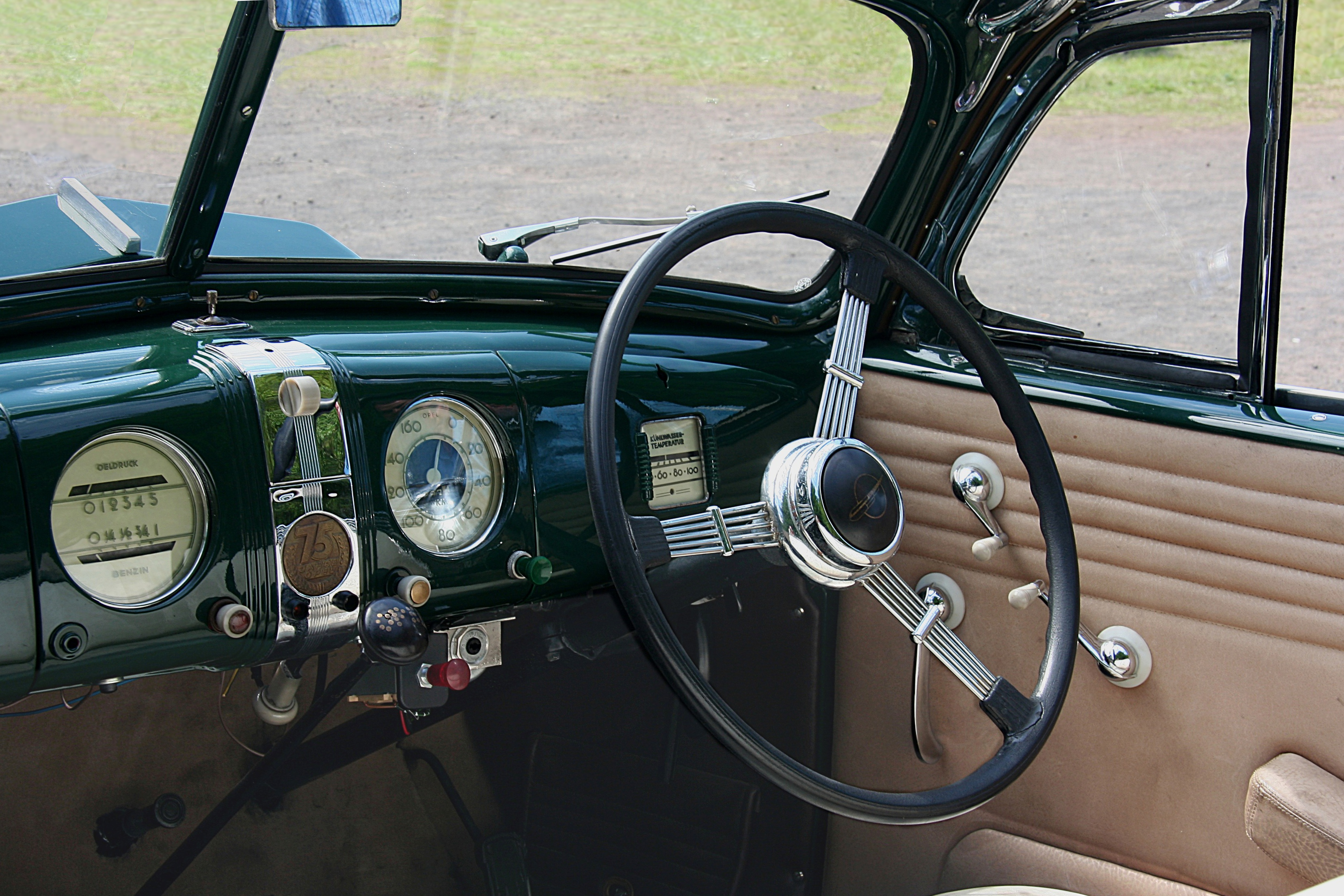
Dashboard of a right-hand drive Opel Admiral

=== Discontinuation ===
Production ended in October 1939, after 6,404 examples had been built. Manufacture was halted more abruptly with the outbreak of the war than for some smaller Opel passenger cars. The military insisted that every 3,626 cc engine that Opel could produce should be fitted in Opel 3.5 ton Blitz trucks for military use.

The army requisitioned many Admirals directly before the outbreak of war, either in order to use them as officers' "staff cars", or in order to cut away the back portion of the car body directly behind the B-pillar and modify them for use as ambulances or light trucks. With only a small number having been built, this means that the first-generation Admiral is a rare car nowadays.

== Admiral A (1964–1968) ==
Admiral A
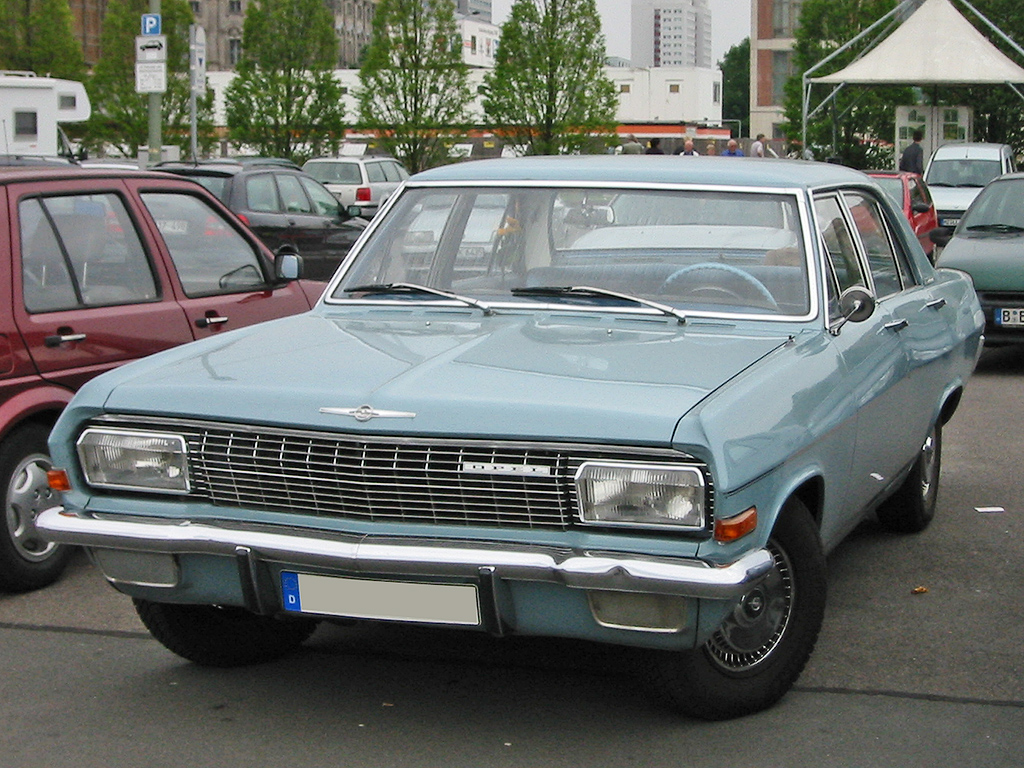
- Admiral A

Overview
- Production: 1964–1968; 55,876 cars
- Designer: Clare MacKichan

Powertrain
- Engine: gasoline: 2.6 L OHV I6; 2.8 L CIH I6; 4.6 L Chevrolet V8
- Transmission: 2-speed Powerglide automatic; 4-speed manual

Dimensions
- Wheelbase: 2,845 mm (112.0 in)
- Length: 4,948 mm (194.8 in)
- Width: 1,902 mm (74.9 in)
- Height: 1,630 mm (64.2 in)
- Curb weight: 1,445–1,600 kg (3,186–3,527 lb)

In 1964, Opel introduced its KAD (Kapitän, Admiral, Diplomat) "A" series models. The Admiral "A" was the middle model in this three-car range. The cars were first presented in February 1964, but volume production of the Admiral began only in May 1964: Chevrolet powered V8 Diplomats started rolling off the production line three months later, in August 1964.

=== Engines ===
The 1964 Admiral was equipped with a 2,605cc straight-6 OHV of 100 PS (74 kW; 99 hp) providing a top speed of 158 km/h (98 mph). An unusual feature of this engine was the incorporation of self-adjusting hydraulic tappets. This engine was offered on the Admiral only for its first year.

From September 1965 Opel fitted the newly developed 2,784 cc straight-six Opel cam-in-head engine (CIH) of 125 PS (92 kW; 123 hp), that enabled the car to reach a top speed of 170 km/h (106 mph). This unit was developed in parallel with a four-cylinder CIH which debuted in an upgraded Opel Rekord at the same time. Several manufacturers replaced pre-war side-valve engines with new overhead camshaft power-plants during this decade; the new Opel also carried its camshaft directly above the cylinders. The chain-driven camshaft still operated the valves using rocker arms because the camshaft itself was not positioned a sufficient distance above the cylinders to permit direct action from the camshaft on the valves. The configuration had been developed by General Motors in Detroit and was known as the cam-in-head (CIH) configuration. One reason for the CIH engine architecture may have been cosmetic. Other automakers such as BMW with their 1500 (launched in 1962) and Volkswagen with their NSU designed K70 (which finally entered the showrooms in 1970), squeezed vital centimeters off the height of the engine unit by canting it over at an eccentric angle in the engine bay. Opel's CIH engine configuration similarly enabled a succession of Opels to feature the low bonnet/hood lines that style-conscious product development departments favored in the 1960s.

From March 1965, the Admiral could also be ordered with the Chevrolet-sourced 4,638 cc (283 cu in) V8 which had been fitted as standard since August 1964 in the Opel Diplomat. The V8 engine was fitted only in conjunction with GM's Powerglide Automatic transmission. From September 1967, the same Powerglide transmission was available as an option, on the six cylinder powered cars.

In September 1967, a new twin-carburetor "HL" (Hochleistung, German for High Output) version of the 2,784 cc six 140 PS (103 kW; 138 hp) was introduced as an option for an extra 495 Marks. That was very much less than the cost of the Chevrolet-sourced V8, which required paying an additional 3,300 Marks for the V8 engine and obligatory automatic transmission.

In 1966 and 1967 a small number of cars were delivered to Austria with 2,473 cc six cylinder engines, presumably in order to benefit from lower car tax rates.

=== September 1967 facelift and upgrade ===
September 1967 saw a slight facelift and general upgrade across the range. All KAD models received discreet rubbing strips on their flanks below the doors and identification of the modified cars was facilitated by the rearranging of the name badges on the front wing panels.

A reworked ZF recirculating ball steering was installed along with a redesigned "safety" steering wheel fixed to the end of a now collapsible steering column.

=== Commercial ===
From 1964 to 1968, Opel produced a total of 55,876 Admirals (out of a grand total of 89,277 KAD cars, making the Admiral by far the most popular of the three).

Only 377 of the Admiral "A"s were fitted with the "Austrian market special" 2,473 cc engine and only 623 came with the expensive Chevrolet sourced V8, leaving the 2.6 and 2.8-litre, six-cylinder engined cars, which found respectively 31,318 and 23,558 buyers, powering more than 98 percent of the Admiral "A"s built.

== Admiral B (1969–1977) ==
Admiral B
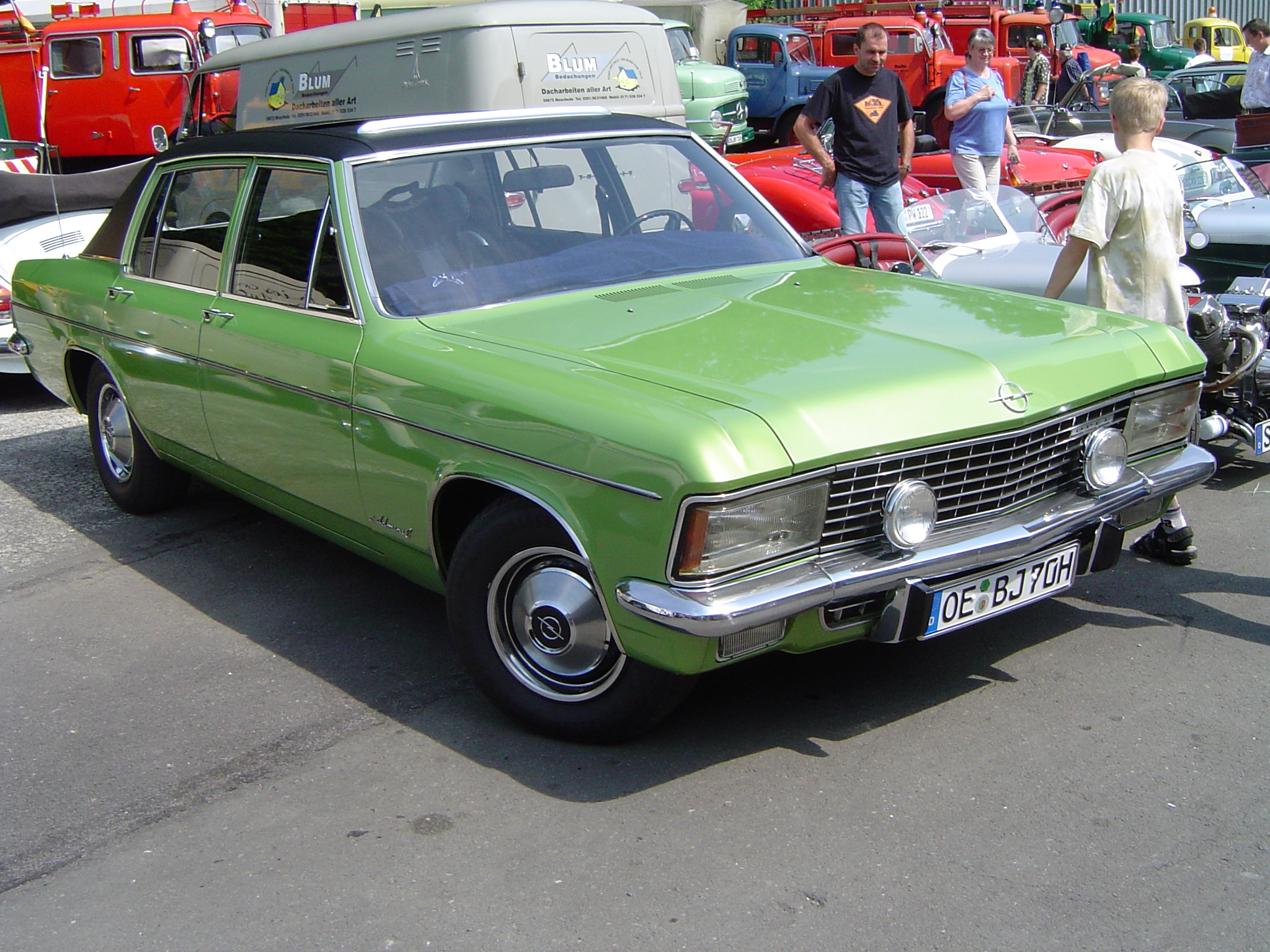
- An Admiral B at an 'Oldtimer' show in Meschede in June 2006

Overview
- Production: 1969–1977; 35,622 cars

Powertrain
- Engine: 2.8 L CIH I6 (gasoline)
- Transmission: 3-speed automatic; 4-speed manual

Dimensions
- Wheelbase: 2,845 mm (112.0 in)
- Length: 4,907 mm (193.2 in)
- Width: 1,852 mm (72.9 in)
- Height: 1,450 mm (57.1 in)
- Curb weight: 1,475–1,650 kg (3,251.8–3,637.6 lb)

The Admiral B was introduced just in time for the Geneva Motor Show in March 1969 together with the new Kapitän and Diplomat. While the Kapitän was discontinued after May 1970, the Admiral and Diplomat survived until 1977. They were replaced by the smaller Opel Senator in 1978.

=== New look ===
The new model shared its 2,845 mm (112.0 in) wheelbase with the previous Admiral, but the Admiral "B"'s overall length of 4,907 mm (193.2 in) was 31 mm (1.2 in) shorter than that of the Admiral A. The stylish body came with American flair both on the outside and on the interior but this, especially in respect of the dashboard that confronted the driver, was at the cost of functionality. The design which could be presented in 1969 as flamboyant and futuristic was not in keeping with the more restrained mood that took hold in Germany in the mid-1970s as fuel costs rose following the 1973 oil price shocks.

=== Chassis upgrade ===
The Admiral "B" was fitted with a De Dion rear-axle which greatly improved road holding, but made the cars costly to manufacture when compared with the simpler suspension arrangements on the previous model. It also greatly reduced the space available in the boot/trunk, which was something customers might notice even before asking for a test drive.

The manual 4-speed transmission was carried over from the previous model, but customers opting for automatic transmission no longer had to contend with the General Motors 2-speed Powerglide system which had originally been conceived for cars with much larger and less stressed US style engines. The Admiral B was offered with a 3-speed "Strasburg" automatic transmission.

From January 1972 the manual option was no longer available with the Admiral E, leaving the automatic as the only choice for customers specifying fuel injection.

=== Engines ===
Like its predecessor, the Admiral "B" came with a 2,784 cc six cylinder CIH engine offering maximum output of 132 PS (97 kW; 130 hp) or, where twin down-draft carburetors were specified, 145 PS (107 kW; 143 hp). The 2,784 cc six cylinder unit could also be ordered with Bosch D-Jetronic fuel injection which increased the maximum output further, to 165 PS (121 kW; 163 hp). This was the first time fuel injection had been offered as an option in an Opel and reflected a more general trend among the German auto-makers towards fitting fuel injected engines, but the fuel injected Admiral was expensive when compared to the simpler twin carburetor engined car. Admiral buyers were no longer offered the option of an upgrade to the Chevrolet-powered version; a 5,354 cc V8 was fitted in the Diplomat version of the car.

During the 1970s Germany followed general trend of discouraging the addition lead to road fuel, which was followed by a reduction in the octane levels of the "normal" and "super" grade fuels widely available at filling stations. Opel reacted by reducing the compression ratios on all three versions of the Admiral's 2,784 cc six cylinder engine which led to reductions in listed maximum outputs of between 3 PS (2 kW; 3 hp) and 5 PS (4 kW; 5 hp).

=== Range changes ===
Although the Admiral "B" was introduced as part of a three car range of similarly bodied cars that also included the less expensive Kapitän and the top of the range Diplomat, the range was reconfigured after the withdrawal in May 1970 of the Kapitän. Instead two less well equipped versions of the Admiral were added to the range.

1972 saw a small facelift which went largely unnoticed, whereby the Model name was removed from the front grille and the Opel "lightning flash" logo was enlarged and placed in the centre of the grille, having between 1969 and 1972 been more discreetly sited on the car's nose centrally above the grille.

As the cars struggled increasingly to find buyers the range of available trim and equipment levels was reduced in March 1976. At the end of 1976 Opel stopped producing the Admiral, replacing it with a reduced specification version of the hitherto more luxurious Diplomat, although the records show that even in the models' last year, 1977, 253 Opel Admirals were produced: this may simply reflect the slow rate of inventory turns by this stage.

=== Commercial ===
During 1969 which was the Admiral "B"'s first year of production, 9,399 Admiral badged cars were produced, which was more than 50% of the combined Kapitän/Admiral/Diplomat ("KAD") range. This was well down on the 19,904 cars produced in 1964 which had been the first year for the Admiral "A". The Admiral appears to have been outclassed and outsold by premium models from premium manufacturers. BMW, with their 2500/2800/3.0 model had returned to the six cylinder sedan market only in 1968, and by 1977 had clocked up an output of 222,001 of these six cylinder engined cars Also on a roll were Mercedes-Benz whose prestigious six cylinder engined "S-Class" 280S/280SE/280SEL models managed 280,473 six cylinder engined cars produced between 1972 and 1980.

Between 1970 and 1973, Admiral production settled down to roughly 5,000 cars per year. The oil price shock of 1973 knocked sales dramatically, and in 1974 Opel produced only 1,168 Admirals out of a total of 1,754 "KAD" models. Despite some recovery in 1975, the model sold in much lower numbers thereafter, while the manufacturer prioritized new investment on less expensive types such as the Ascona.

Opel produced 36,522 Admiral "B" models between 1969 and 1977, together with 4,976 Kapitän "B"s (all between 1969 and 1970) and 21,021 Diplomat "B"s.

== Sources ==
This entry incorporates information from the equivalent article in the German Wikipedia.

- Oswald, Werner (2001). Deutsche Autos 1920–1945, Band (vol) 2 (in German). Motorbuch Verlag. ISBN 3-613-02170-6.
- Oswald, Werner (2003). Deutsche Autos 1945–1990, Band (vol) 3 (in German). Motorbuch Verlag. ISBN 3-613-02116-1.
- Oswald, Werner (2001). Deutsche Autos 1945–1990, Band (vol) 4 (in German). Motorbuch Verlag. ISBN 3-613-02131-5.
- KAD Historie
