= Martin Walter of Folkestone =

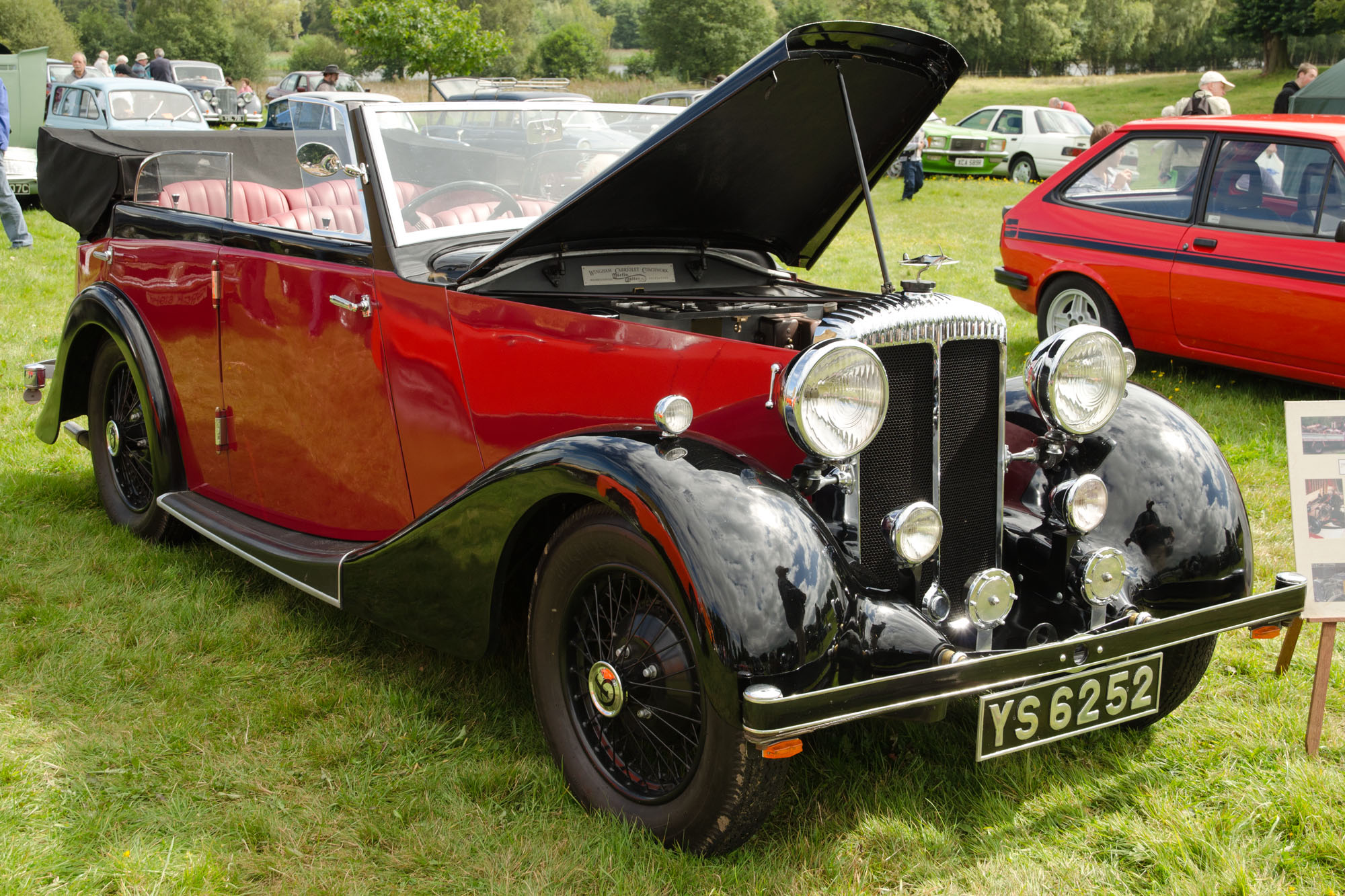
1936 Wingham cabriolet Daimler 15 note distinctive Wingham quarter-lights

Martin-Walter was a long established, 1773, firm of harness makers in Folkestone, Kent which switched to building bespoke bodies for motor cars when horse-drawn vehicles began to disappear. As well as bespoke bodies they built short runs for various motor manufacturers. In the Great Depression of the 1930s they made very distinctive Wingham cabriolet bodies which were fitted to a range of chassis from large Vauxhall to Rolls-Royce. After the Second World War they built ambulance bodies and in particular conversions of Bedford vans, "a bedroom on wheels", and other Vauxhall products as well as Austin and Volkswagen Kombi vans.

Martin Walter was distributor of Vauxhall and Bedford Vehicles for East Kent.

A separate coachbuilding company was incorporated in 1969 and named Dormobile after its best-known postwar product.

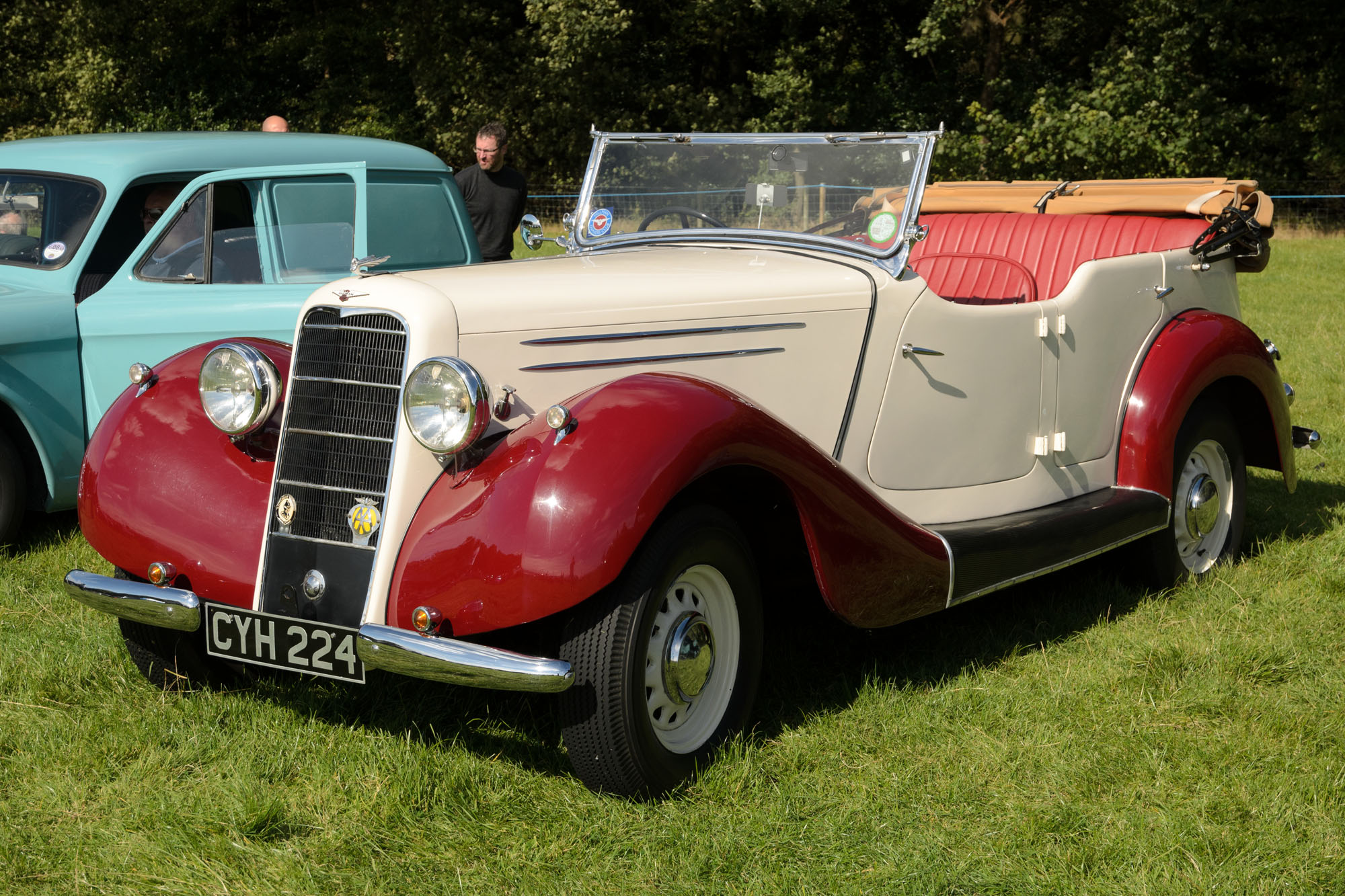
1936 sports tourer for Rootes Group, not a Wingham, on a Hillman Hawk chassis

Martin Walter's business was subsumed in Chatfields-Martin Walter motor group.
