= List of Opel concept cars =

German automaker Opel has shown more concept cars than production cars since 1965.

Year	Concept name	Place	Comments	Image
1965	Opel Experimental GT		Coupé	
1968	Opel Elektro GT		Coupé	
1969	Opel Aero GT		Coupé	
1975	Opel GT2		Coupé	
1981	Opel Tech 1		Hatchback	
1983	Opel Junior	Frankfurt Motor Show	City car	
1992	Opel Twin	Geneva Motor Show		
1995	Opel Maxx	Geneva Motor Show	City car	
1996	Opel Slalom Coupe			
1999	Opel Concept A	Geneva Motor Show	City car	
1999	Opel G90	Frankfurt Motor Show	Supermini	
2001	Opel Frogster	Frankfurt Motor Show		
2001	Opel Filo	Geneva Motor Show	MPV	
2001	Opel HydroGen3			
2002	Opel Eco Speedster	Opel Test Center; Dudenhofen		
2003	Opel Insignia Concept	Frankfurt Motor Show	Luxury car	
2003	Opel GTC Genève	Geneva Motor Show	Hatchback	
2004	Opel Trixx	Geneva Motor Show	City car with inflatable rear seat	
2005	Opel Antara GTC	Frankfurt Motor Show	SUV	
2007	Opel Flextreme	Frankfurt Motor Show	MPV	
2007	Opel GTC Concept	Geneva Motor Show		
2009	Opel Ampera	Geneva Motor Show	Sedan	
2010	Opel Flextreme GT/E	Geneva Motor Show		
2011	Opel RAK e	Frankfurt Motor Show		
2011	Opel Zafira Tourer Concept	Geneva Motor Show	MPV	
2013	Opel Monza Concept	Frankfurt Motor Show		
2016	Opel GT Concept	Geneva Motor Show	Coupé	
2019	Opel GT X Experimental concept		SUV	
2021	Opel Manta GSe ElektroMOD		Coupé	
2023	Opel Experimental	IAA Mobility Show	SUV	

== See also ==
- List of automobiles
- List of Opel vehicles
