= Vauxhall Velox =

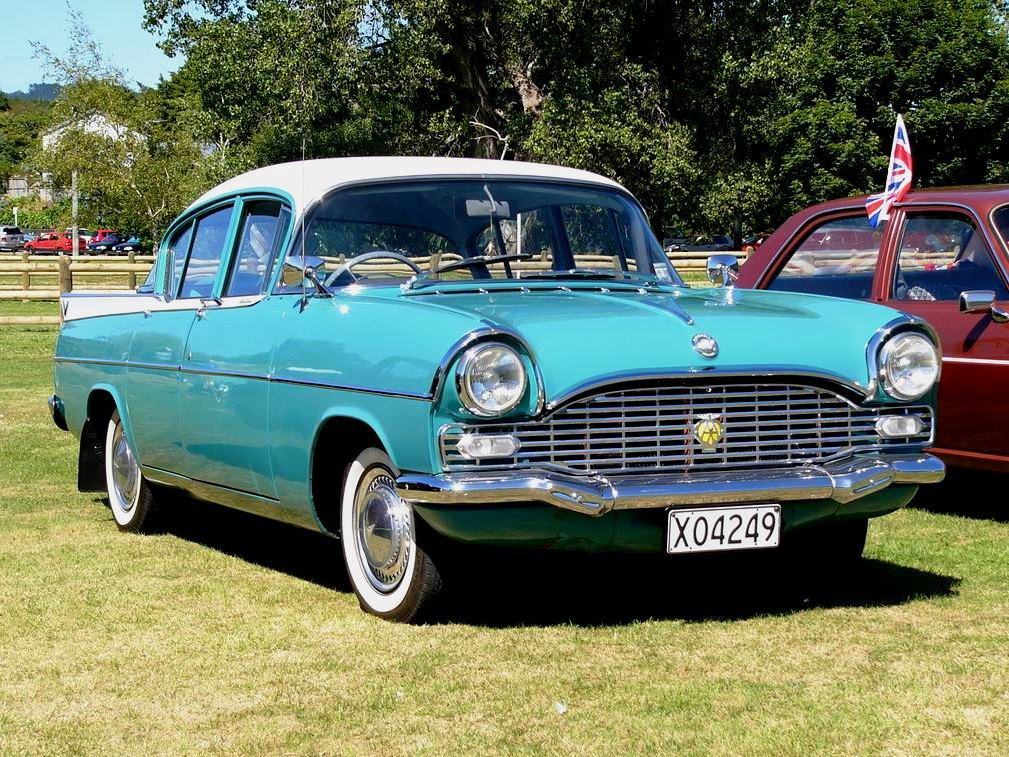
- PA S Saloon 1962

Overview
- Manufacturer: Vauxhall (General Motors)
- Production: 1948–1965

Body and chassis
- Class: Executive car
- Layout: FR layout
- Related: Vauxhall Wyvern 1948–1957; Vauxhall Cresta 1954–1972

Chronology
- Predecessor: Vauxhall Fourteen (J)
- Successor: Vauxhall Cresta PC

The Vauxhall Velox is a six-cylinder executive car which was produced by Vauxhall from 1948 to 1965. The Velox was a large family car, directly competing in the UK with the contemporary six-cylinder Ford Zephyr, and to a slightly lesser extent, with the A90, A95, and A110 Austin Westminster models.

It was introduced by Vauxhall shortly before the London Motor Show in October 1948, as a successor to the Vauxhall Fourteen. Between 1948 and 1957 the Velox shared its body with the less-powerful four-cylinder Vauxhall Wyvern. From August 1954 through to October 1965, it shared its body with the more luxuriously equipped Vauxhall Cresta, a tradition that ended with the introduction of the new PC Vauxhalls. The Velox name was discontinued at that time in favour of the more upmarket Vauxhall Cresta name, while a new flagship model, the Vauxhall Viscount, was launched.

The Velox and its Opel contemporaries are remembered for having mirrored North American styling trends (e.g. the Ponton style of body) much more closely than other European models of the time. That was particularly apparent following the 1957 introduction of the PA version of the Velox.

== Velox LIP & LBP (1948–51) ==
Vauxhall Velox LIP
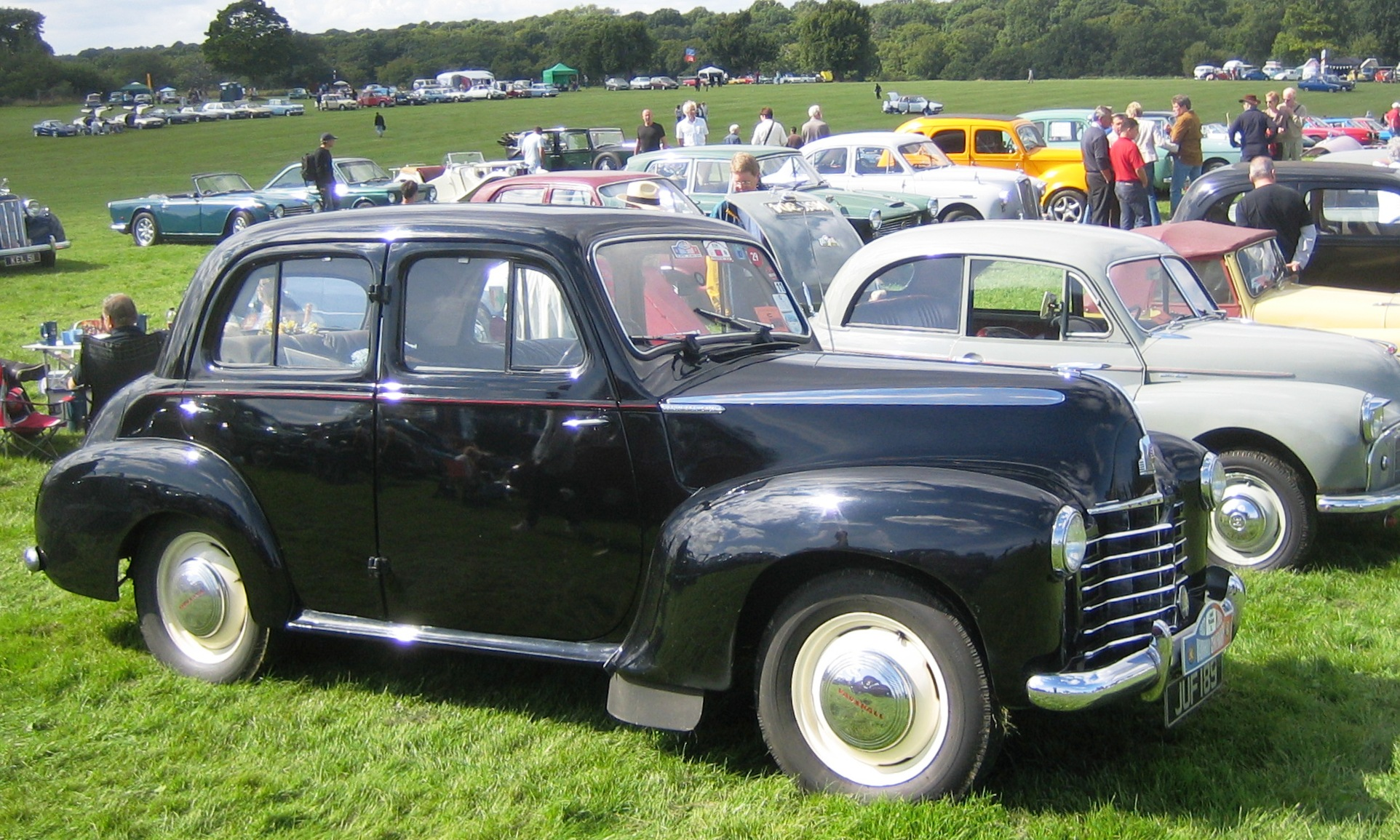

Overview
- Production: 1948–51
- Assembly: Luton, Bedfordshire, England; Biel, Switzerland; Australia, Petone, New Zealand; South Africa

Body and chassis
- Body style: 4-door saloon 2-door tourer (Australia)
- Related: Vauxhall Wyvern

Powertrain
- Engine: 2,275 cc (138.8 cu in) I6 ohv 54 bhp (40 kW)

Dimensions
- Wheelbase: 97.75 in (2,483 mm)
- Length: 164.5 in (4,178 mm)
- Width: 62 in (1,575 mm)
- Height: 63 in (1,600 mm)
- Kerb weight: 2,268 lb (1,029 kg)

The classic four-door saloon boasted a newly developed straight-six-cylinder engine of 2,275 cc (138.8 cu in), with overhead valves. The 54 bhp (40 kW) power output provided for a claimed top speed of 74 mph (119 km/h). Power was delivered to the rear wheels via a three-speed manual gear box with synchromesh on the top two ratios.

Optional extras included a heater from which warm air was evenly distributed between the front and back areas of the passenger cabin and which could be set to de-ice the windscreen in winter or to provide cool air ventilation in summer. Also available at extra charge was an AM radio integrated into the fascia.

The body was shared with the four-cylinder Vauxhall Wyvern, a pattern that continued with subsequent versions of the Velox until the introduction of the more compact Vauxhall Victor at the beginning of 1957. While the Velox exterior differed only in badging, additional brightwork and different coloured wheels, the interior boasted superior seating materials over the Wyvern including a central arm rest in the rear.

A car tested by The Motor magazine in 1949 had a top speed of 74.1 mph (119.3 km/h) and could accelerate from 0–60 mph (97 km/h) in 22.8 seconds. A fuel consumption of 22.3 miles per imperial gallon (12.7 L/100 km; 18.6 mpg_{‑US}) was recorded. The test car cost £550 including taxes.

=== Foreign production ===
As well as being built at Vauxhall's Luton plant in England, early Velox and Wyvern models were assembled in Australia (by Holden in Melbourne) and in New Zealand at the GM plant in Petone, near Wellington. The LBP model ID was applied to "chassis only" exports to Australia, where local production included a two-door Caleche tourer and, in early four-door saloons, a unique "six-light" body featuring an additional rear window behind the back doors. This gave the car more resemblance from the rear to the pre-war designed J-series Vauxhall Fourteen it replaced (see accompanying illustration below).

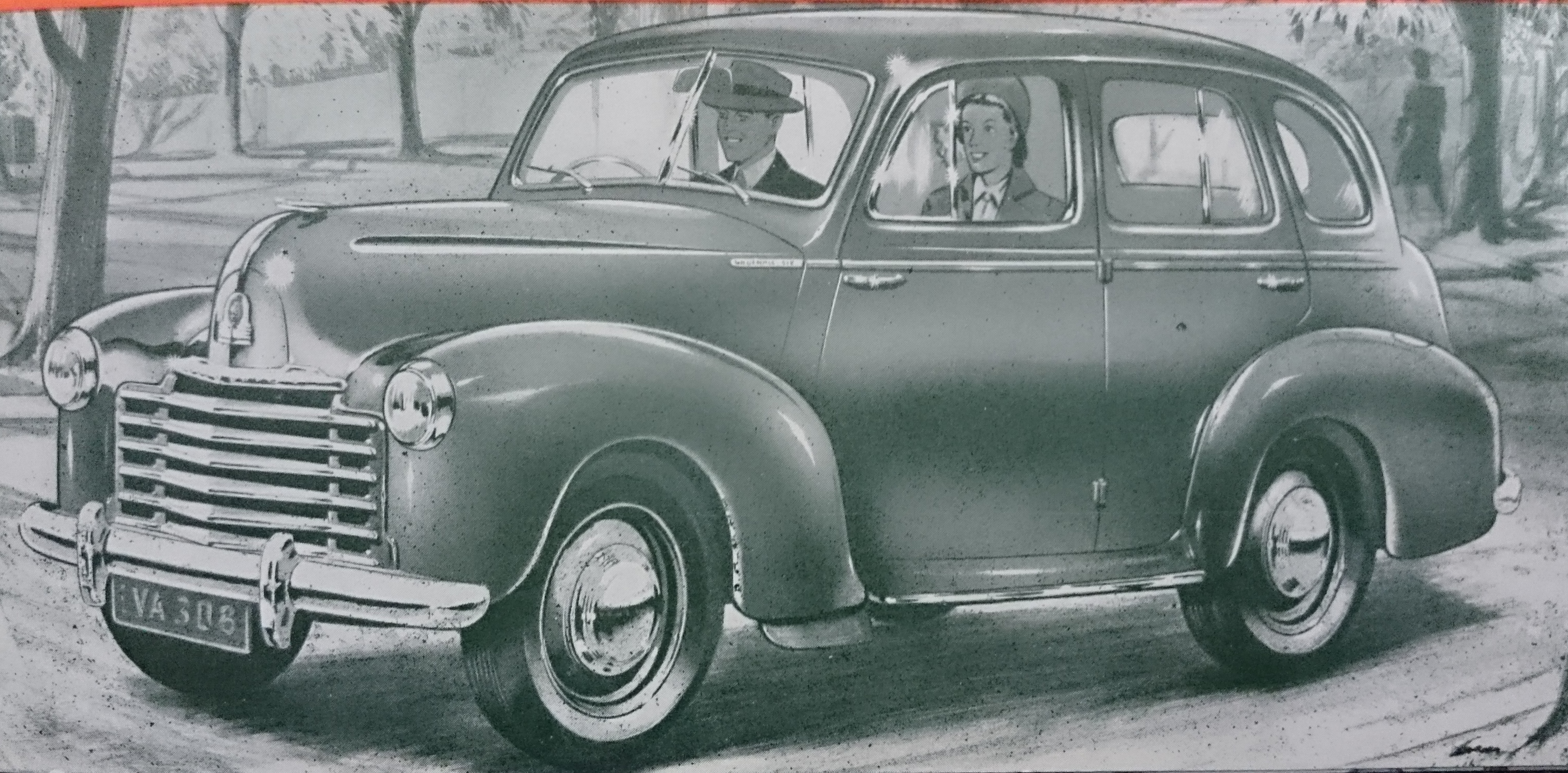
Brochure image of Australian produced 1949 Vauxhall Velox Saloon (LBP)

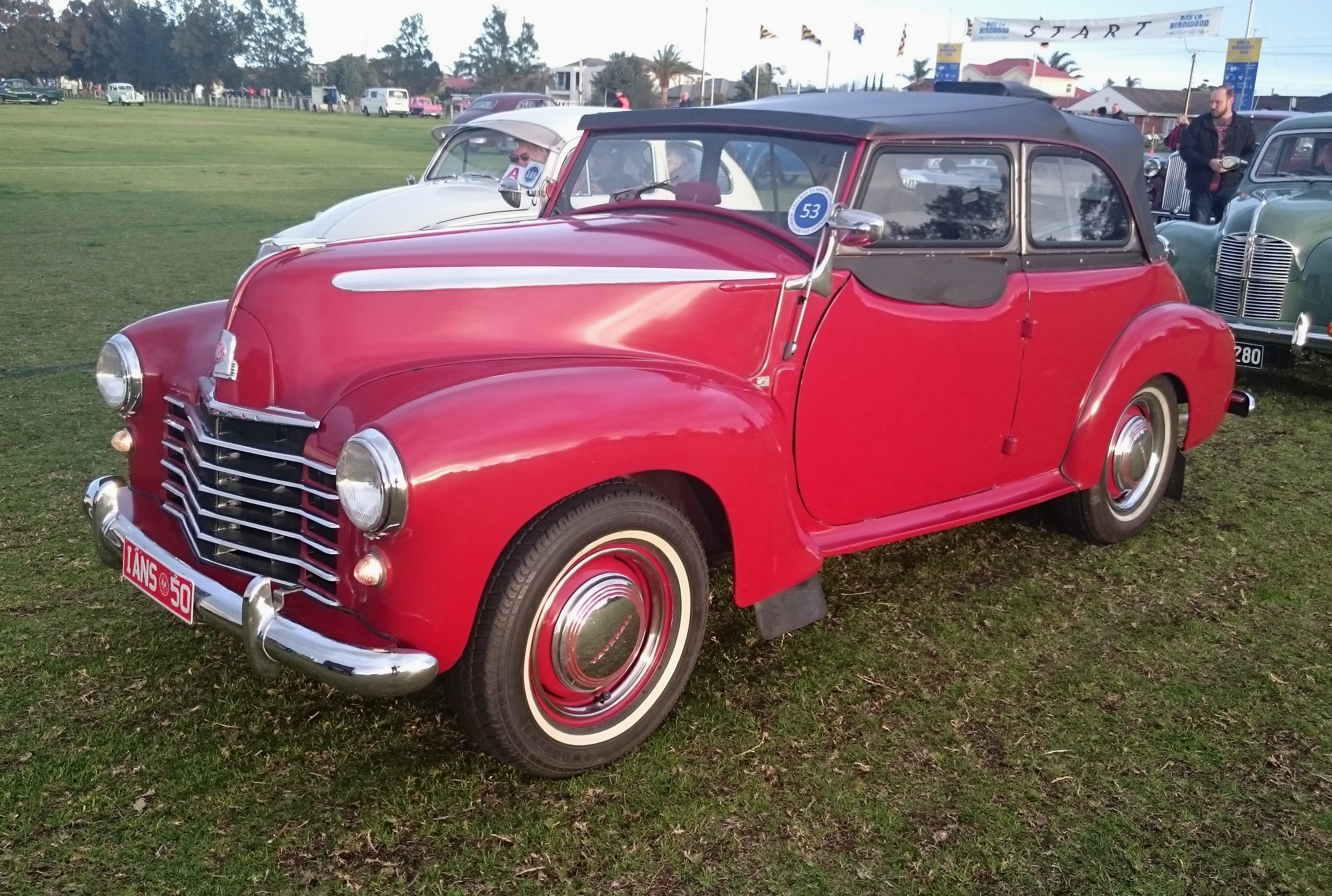
Australian Vauxhall Velox Caleche (LBP)

Velox LIP production also took place in Switzerland, where a 400 kg van version (built by Geser of Lucerne) was a common sight in the 1950s serving as Swiss Post Office vehicles. Despite the lack of bumper over-riders suggesting the four-cylinder Wyvern powerplant, all vans were Veloxes. Conventional Velox and Wyvern four-door saloons were assembled at the General Motors plant at Biel.

Also built in Switzerland was a unique prototype two seater roadster known as the Vauxhall Zimmerli-Velox 18–6. This used a coach built aluminium body on a tubular ladder chassis, with standard Velox running gear. It was built in 1949 for the Zimmerli brothers, who had a Vauxhall dealership in Reiden. The car survives today in near original condition.

== Velox EIP/EIPV & EBP (1951–57) ==
Vauxhall Velox
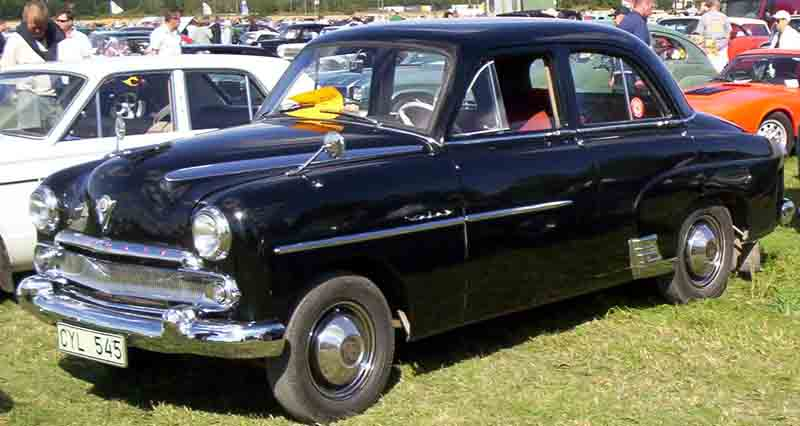
- 1955 Vauxhall Velox EIP Saloon

Overview
- Model code: EIP; EIPV; EBP
- Production: 1951–57; 235,296 made
- Assembly: Luton, Bedfordshire, England; Australia, Petone, New Zealand; Antwerp, Belgium

Body and chassis
- Body style: 4-door saloon; estate car; 2-door tourer; 2-door coupe utility
- Related: Vauxhall Cresta EIPC; Vauxhall Wyvern EIX

Powertrain
- Engine: EIP – 2275 cc I6 ohv 55 bhp (41 kW); EIPV – 2262 cc I6 ohv 64 bhp (48 kW) or 67.5 bhp (50.3 kW)
- Transmission: 3-speed manual

Dimensions
- Wheelbase: 103 in (2,616 mm)
- Length: 172 in (4,369 mm)
- Width: 67 in (1,702 mm)
- Height: 63.5 in (1,613 mm)
- Kerb weight: 2,352 lb (1,067 kg) - 2,436 lb (1,105 kg)

In August 1951 a longer, wider Velox was launched, designated as the EIP series, and featuring a modern 'three box' shape and integral construction. The body was again shared with the 4-cylinder-engined Wyvern. The car was launched with the previous model's engine but with power output increased to 58 bhp (43 kW).

A car with the original 2275 cc engine tested by The Motor magazine in 1951 had a top speed of 77.4 mph (124.6 km/h) and could accelerate from 0-60 mph (97 km/h) in 23.7 seconds. A fuel consumption of 23.5 miles per imperial gallon (12.0 L/100 km; 19.6 mpg_{‑US}) was recorded. The test car cost £802 including taxes. In the same year, the magazine tested the similarly sized Ford Zephyr Six. Ford's test car was fitted with options including a radio, a heater and leather seating: thus equipped the Zephyr came with a recommended retail price of £842.

In April 1952 the Velox was redesignated as the EIPV series, and received a new over-square 2262 cc engine which had been in the development pipeline for several years. This provided either 64 bhp (48 kW) or, with a compression ratio improved to 7.6:1, 68 bhp (51 kW) of power.

A further test in 1952 by The Motor magazine of the EIPV with the short-stroke 2262 cc engine, found the top speed had increased to 80.4 mph (129.4 km/h) and acceleration from 0–60 mph (97 km/h) to 21.4 seconds. A similar fuel consumption of 23.6 miles per imperial gallon (12.0 L/100 km; 19.7 mpg_{‑US}) was recorded. The test car cost had risen to £833 including taxes.

In December 1952 General Motors Holden launched a tourer and coupe utility version of the EIPV Velox and EIX Wyvern models on the Australian market, these cars' chassis were prefixed EBP for the Velox and EBX for the Wyvern. Both these cars used modified Vauxhall bodies affixed to the Bedford CA chassis. The tourer was originally to be called the Caleche but by the time of launch the model name was changed to Vagabond. The Vagabond was a two-door five seater with folding top and side curtains. It did not survive the 1955 face lift. The coupe utility continued on (Velox only from 1955) until officially withdrawn at the end of the 1957 model year.

In August 1954 a significant facelift was applied. Most obvious of the many cosmetic changes was a new front grille and trafficators were replaced by flashing lights (red at the rear, US-style). More important was the introduction at this time of a sister model, branded as the Vauxhall Cresta. In addition to superior equipment levels, the Cresta was distinguished by a two tone paint finish. The 1954 VELOX also differed from the 1953 which had a side opening bonnet, by having a front opening bonnet

Detroit was by now favouring annual facelifts, and Vauxhall reflected that trend, announcing further facelifts for 1956 (wind-up windows, larger rear window, wider grille slats, separate amber rear flashing indicator lights replacing US-style red units incorporated into the brake/tail light lens, new instrument graphics) and again for 1957 (electric wipers, larger tail lights, new grille, new 'magic ribbon' AC speedo) in line with the Wyvern model. Technically, however, there were no further changes until the arrival of a completely new Velox in October 1957.

In Australia, Holden built a quantity of utilities (pickup trucks) as well as the 2-door Vagabond Convertible based on the EIP Velox. These had a separate chassis - prefixed EBP - with the Australian bodies fitted to them. The Velox was also assembled at the General Motors New Zealand plant in Petone, north of Wellington, through to and including the PC Cresta of the late 1960s, by which time buyer favour had turned to the similarly sized GM-dealer stablemate from Australia, the Holden Belmont/Kingswood.

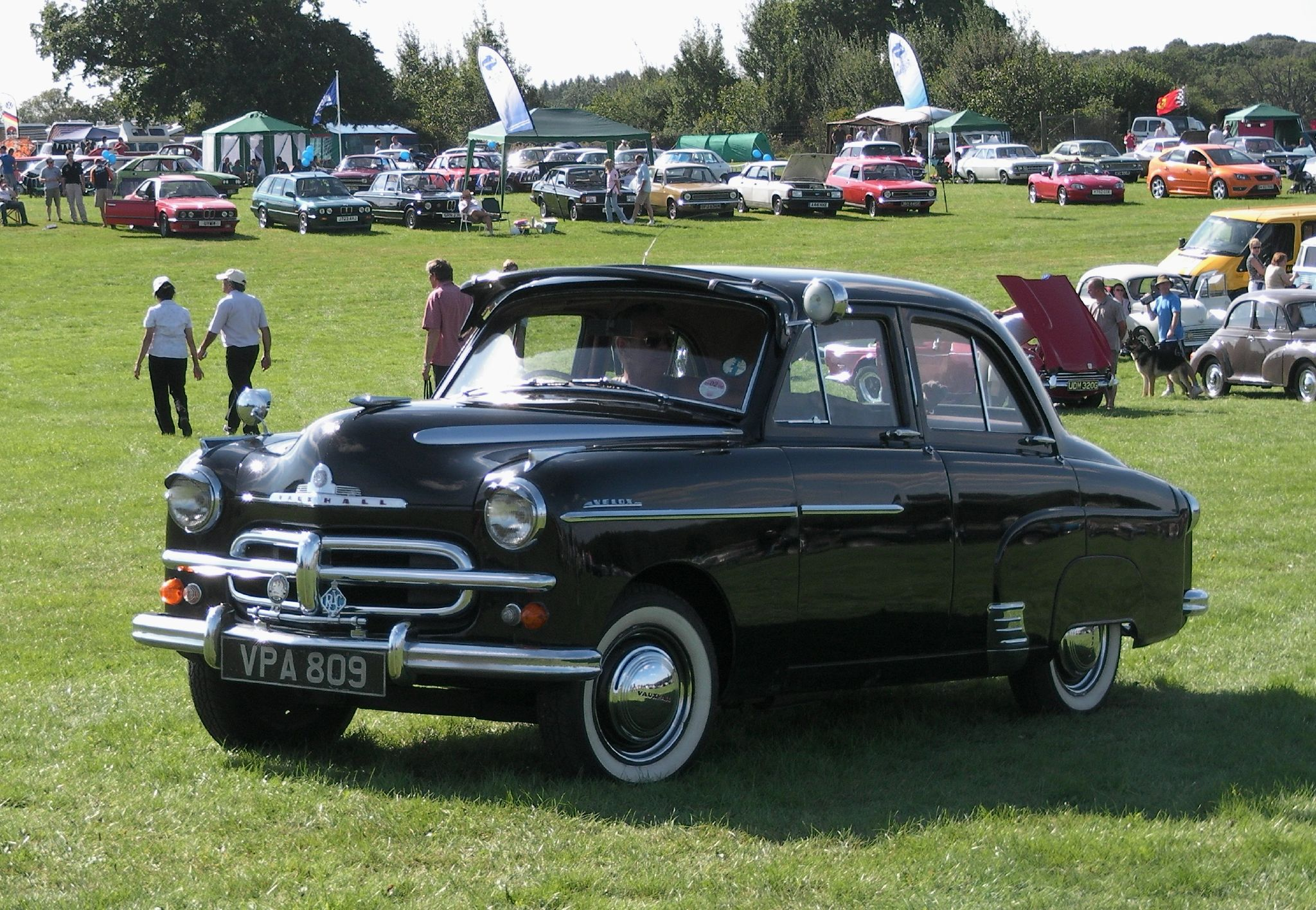
Vauxhall Velox EIP or EIPV Saloon, pre 1954 facelift

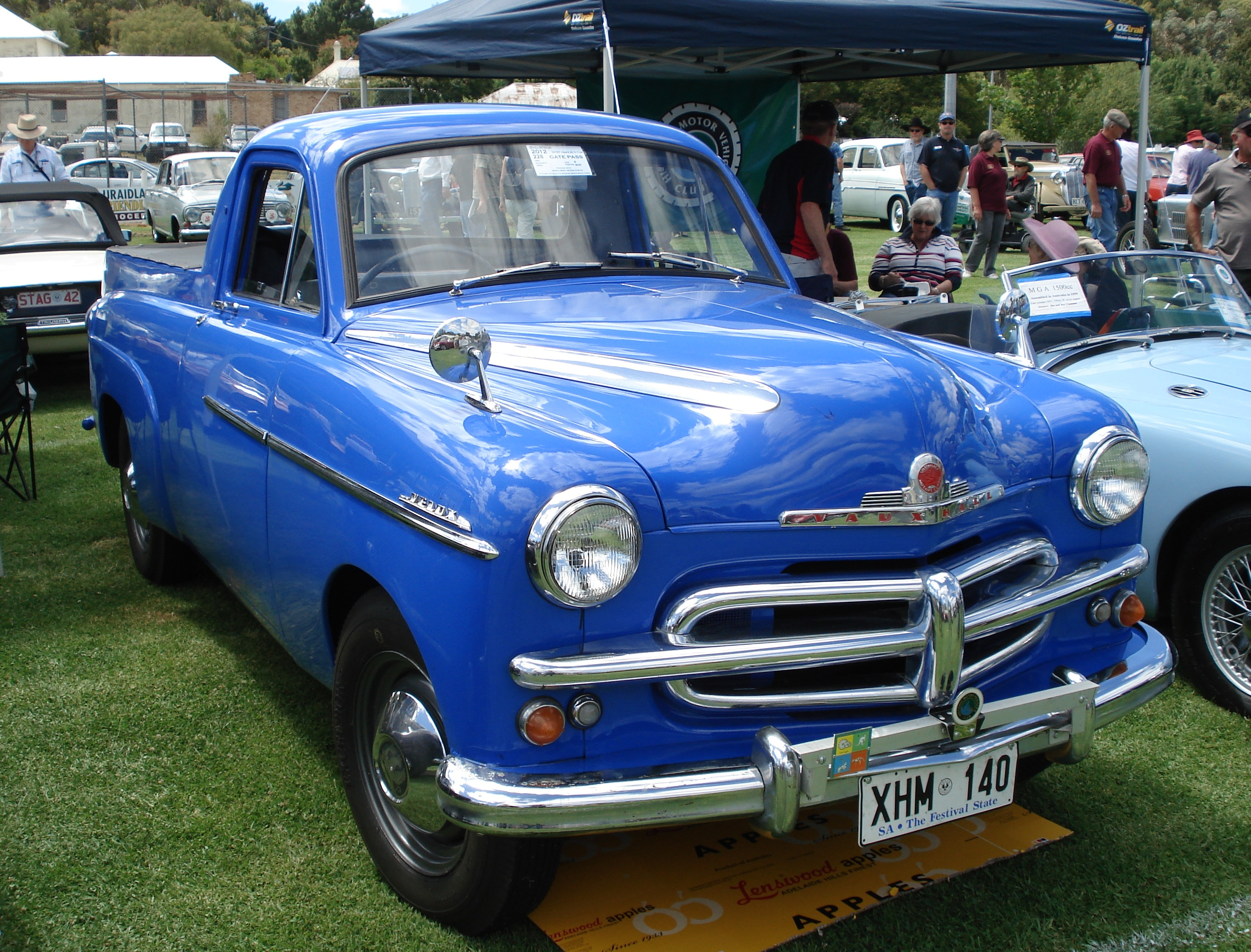
Australian Vauxhall Velox (EBP) Coupe Utility 1954

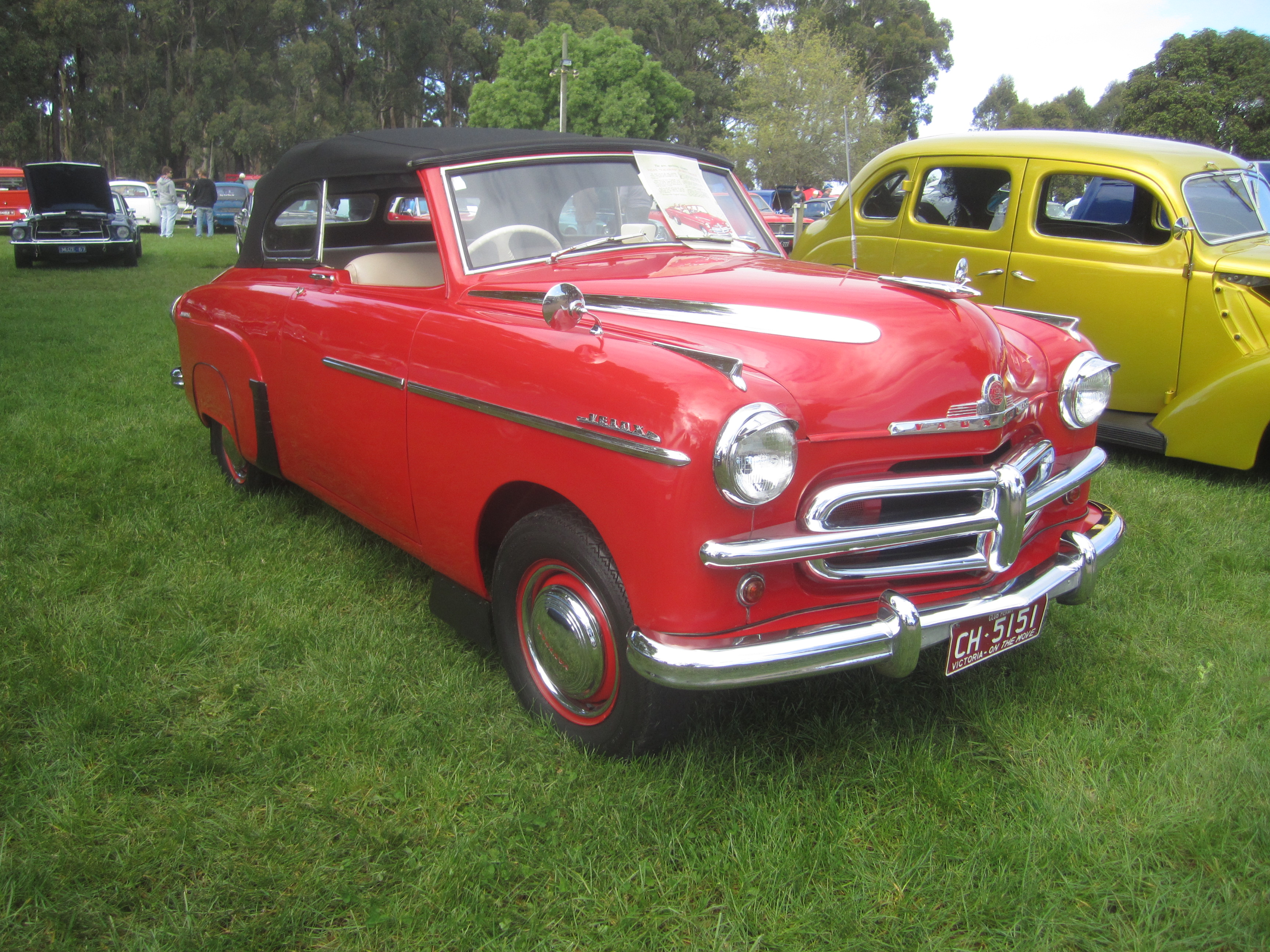
Australian Vauxhall Velox Vagabond (EBP) Tourer
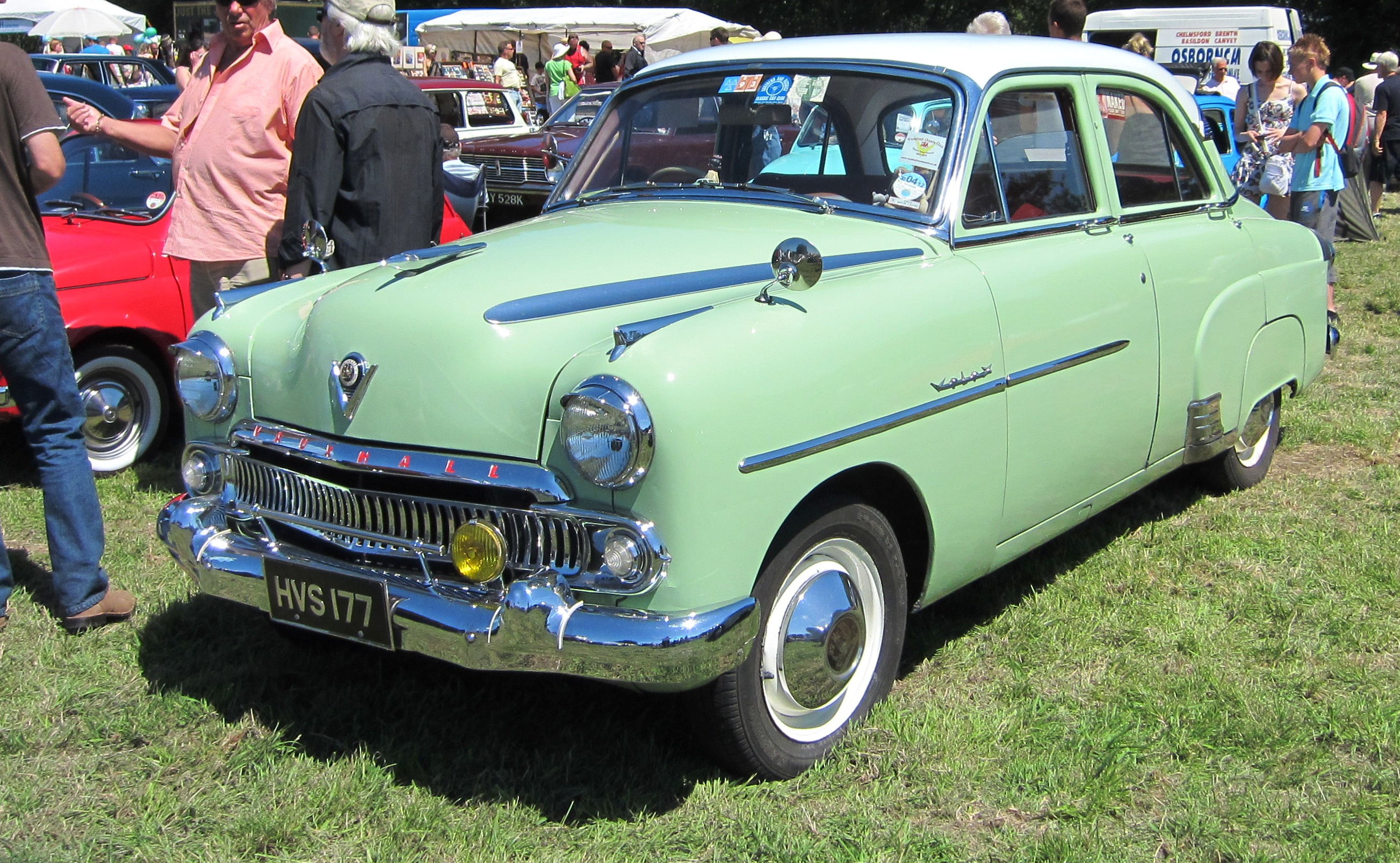
Vauxhall Velox EIPV Saloon 1956

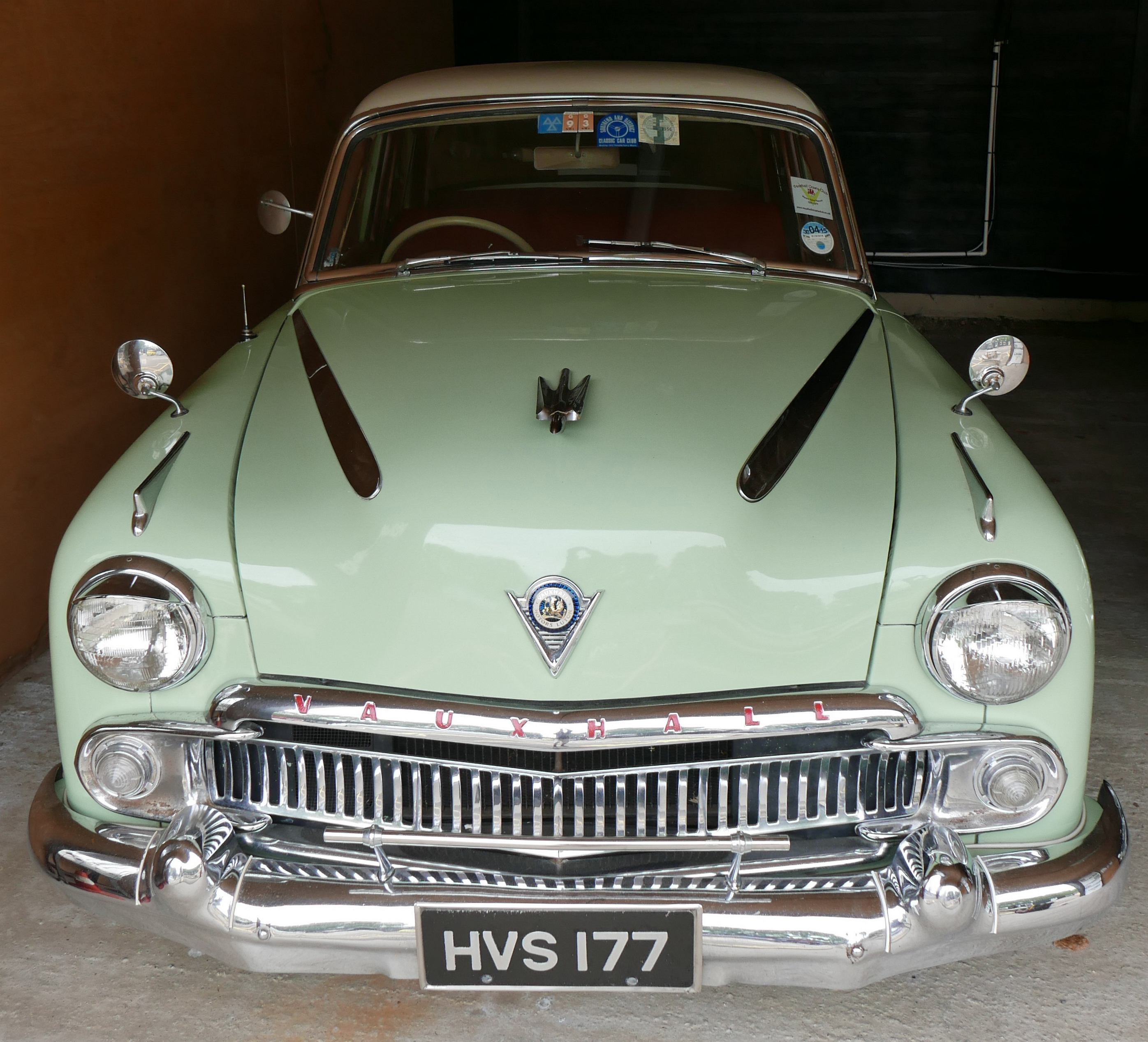
Vauxhall Velox EIPV 1956 front view

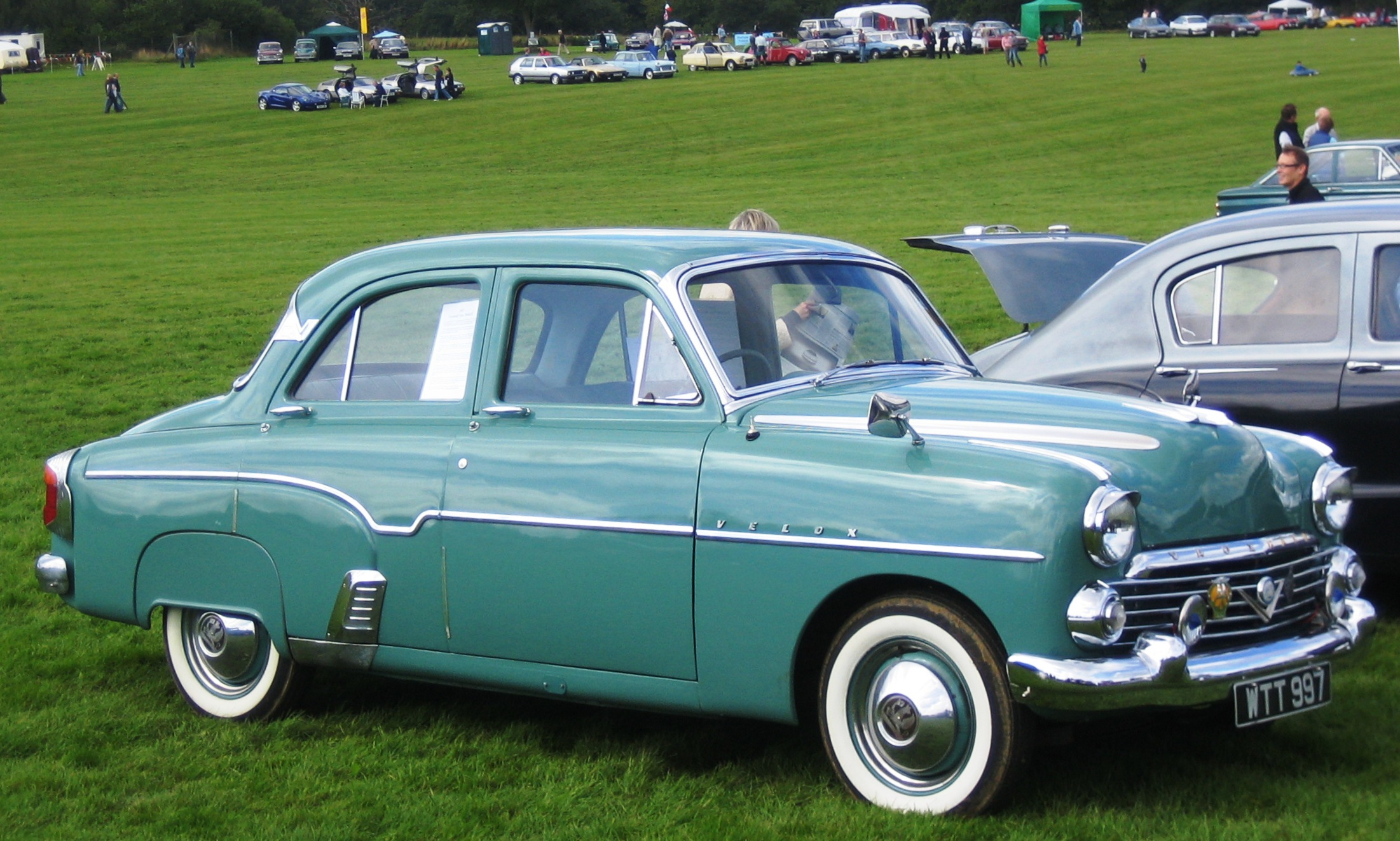
Vauxhall Velox EIPV Saloon 1957

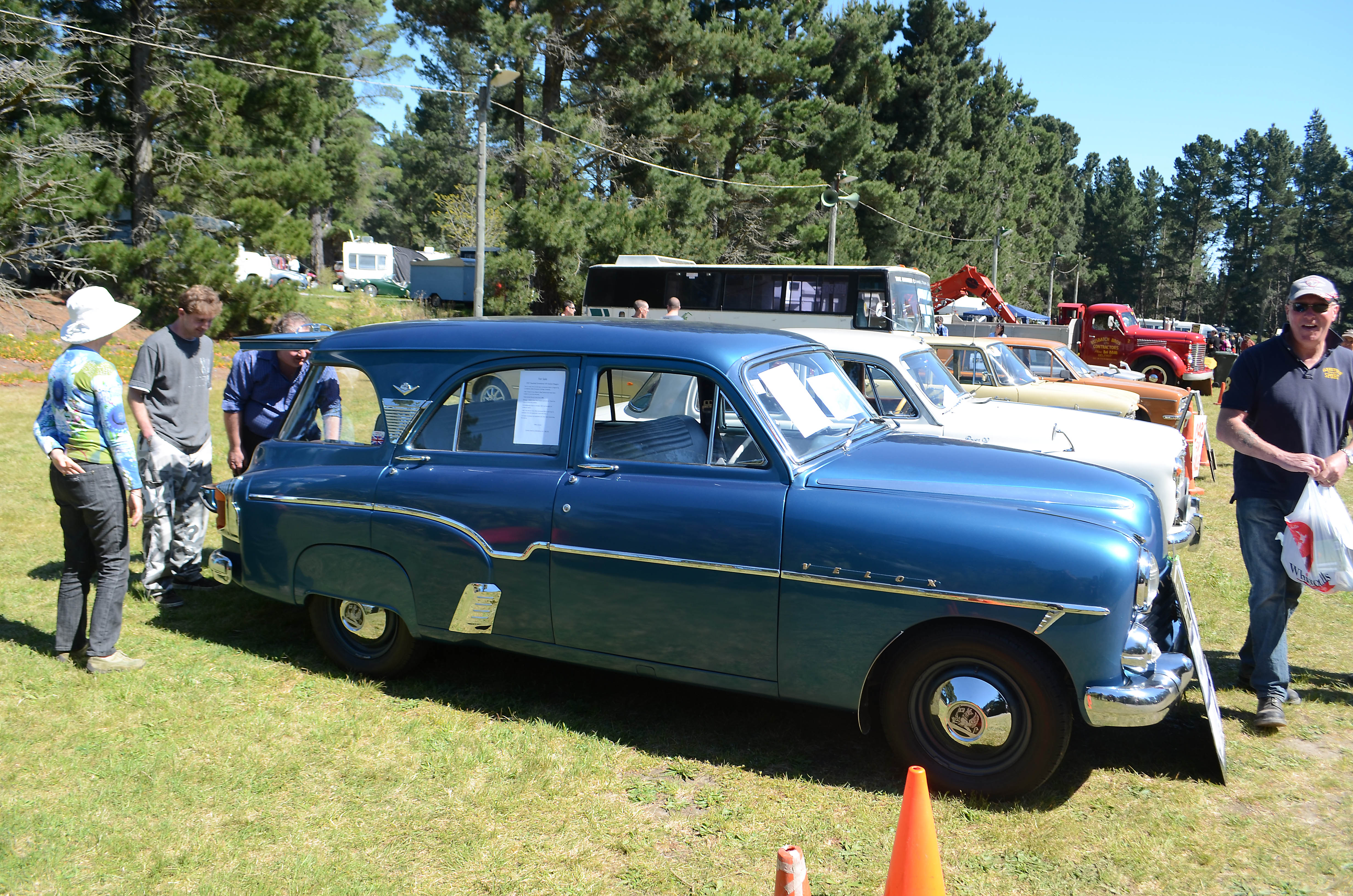
Velox EIPV Grosvenor estate by Grosvenor Carriage Co 1957

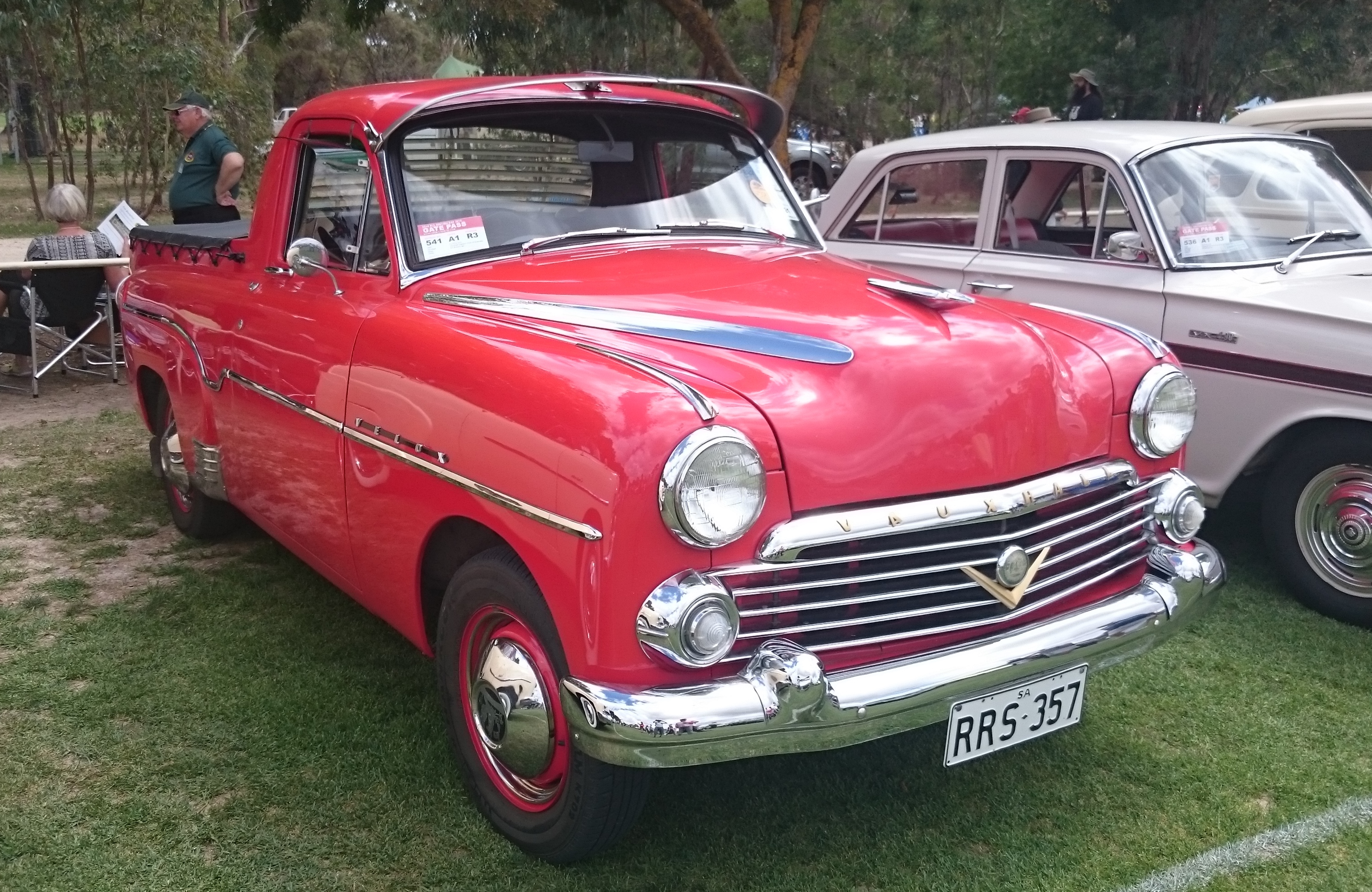
Australian Vauxhall Velox (EBP) Coupe Utility 1957

== Velox PA (1957–62) ==
Vauxhall Velox PA
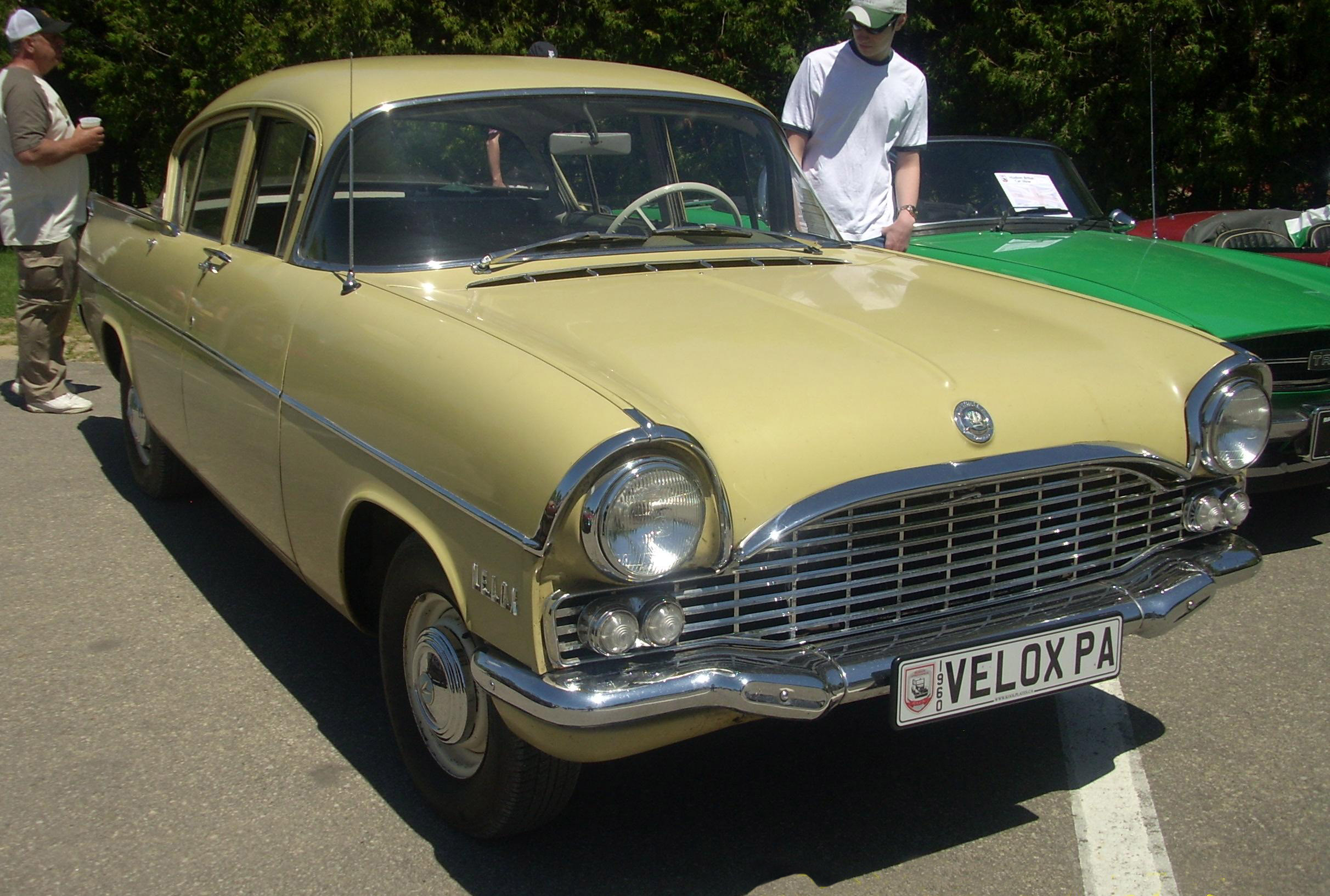
- Velox PA SY

Overview
- Production: 1957–1962
- Assembly: Luton, Bedfordshire, England; Australia; Petone, New Zealand

Body and chassis
- Body style: 4-door saloon 5-door estate car
- Related: Vauxhall Cresta PA

Powertrain
- Engine: 2.3 L (2,262 cc) ohv I6; 82.5 bhp (61.5 kW); 2.7 L (2,651 cc) ohv I6; 94.6 bhp (70.5 kW)

Dimensions
- Wheelbase: 105 in (2,667 mm)
- Length: 177.5 in (4,508 mm)
- Width: 68.5 in (1,740 mm)
- Kerb weight: 2,520–2,576 lb (1,143–1,168 kg)

=== Velox PA S (1957–59) ===
At the 1957 London Motor Show Vauxhall presented radically new Velox and Cresta models: these would come to be known as the PA versions, being the first of the P series. Particularly eye catching was the new wrap-around windscreen; combined with a three part rear window it created an airy passenger cabin providing exceptional all round visibility, Like the Cresta on which it was based, the PA Velox took styling cues from the 1957 Buick Special. The back of the Velox was graced by tail fins, a Detroit inspired trend already taken up by the car's Ford rival, and which would in the next two years be followed also by UK rival BMC, and such European competitors as the Fiat 2100 and Peugeot 404. Opel was also offering a similarly sized and styled car at the time, the Opel Kapitän P1. On the inside the new Velox also followed US practice of combining a front bench seat with a column-shift gear lever, continuing a trend that dates back to the first Velox models of 1948. Velox models were also assembled at the General Motors Holden plants throughout Australia, and the General Motors New Zealand plant in Petone, north of Wellington. The Wyvern was replaced by the new Victor model line which was also built in the New Zealand plant. Specially engineered versions of the Velox were built for use by the NZ Traffic Police.

Minor modifications to the car's six-cylinder engine raised power output to 83 bhp (61 kW). As before, the Cresta was distinguished from the Velox model by superior levels of equipment and also a two-tone paint finish.

=== Velox PA SY (1959–60) ===
The Velox PA received its first facelift in October 1959 when the front grille was enlarged and the three-piece rear window was replaced by a single wrap-around window. Technical improvements had to await the 1960 facelift, however.

=== Velox PA SX (1960–62) ===
The October 1960 facelift for 1961 was marked by further modifications to the trim, new rear lights with modified tail fins (no longer with indicators built in), combined front park/indicator lamps and a new dashboard with the two round dials replaced by a rectangular cluster with "magic ribbon" speedometer – the strip indicating speed changed from green to amber at 30 mph and to red at 60 mph. There was also a new engine, still of six cylinders, but now increased in capacity to 2651 cc, and delivering 95 bhp (71 kW). The UK had recently embarked on its first programme of motorway building, and the Velox now boasted a straight line maximum speed of 94 mph (151 km/h). Velox models were also assembled at the General Motors New Zealand plant in Petone with special versions again built for local traffic police.

PA five-door estate models, converted by Friary of Basingstoke, were also available.

In their 1961–62 forms, the Velox and its Cresta sibling continued without further significant changes until replaced towards the end of 1962. For 1962, the painted dashboard gave way to simulated wood, the ashtray was moved from an in-dash drawer to the dashtop, wipers were lengthened to overlap slightly, a horn ring was added to the Velox steering wheel and there were minor instrument cluster changes to increase the size of warning lights.

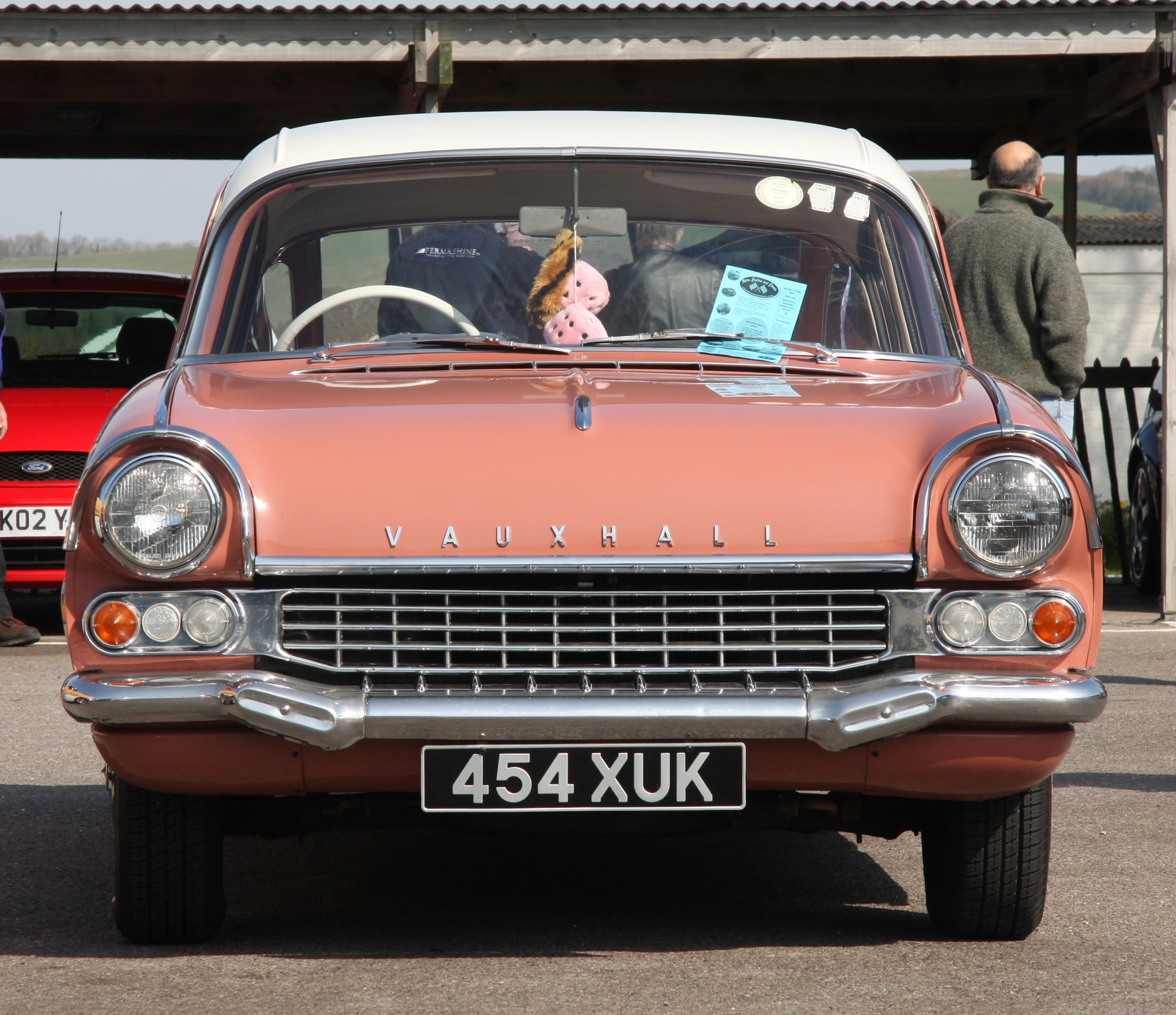
S saloon

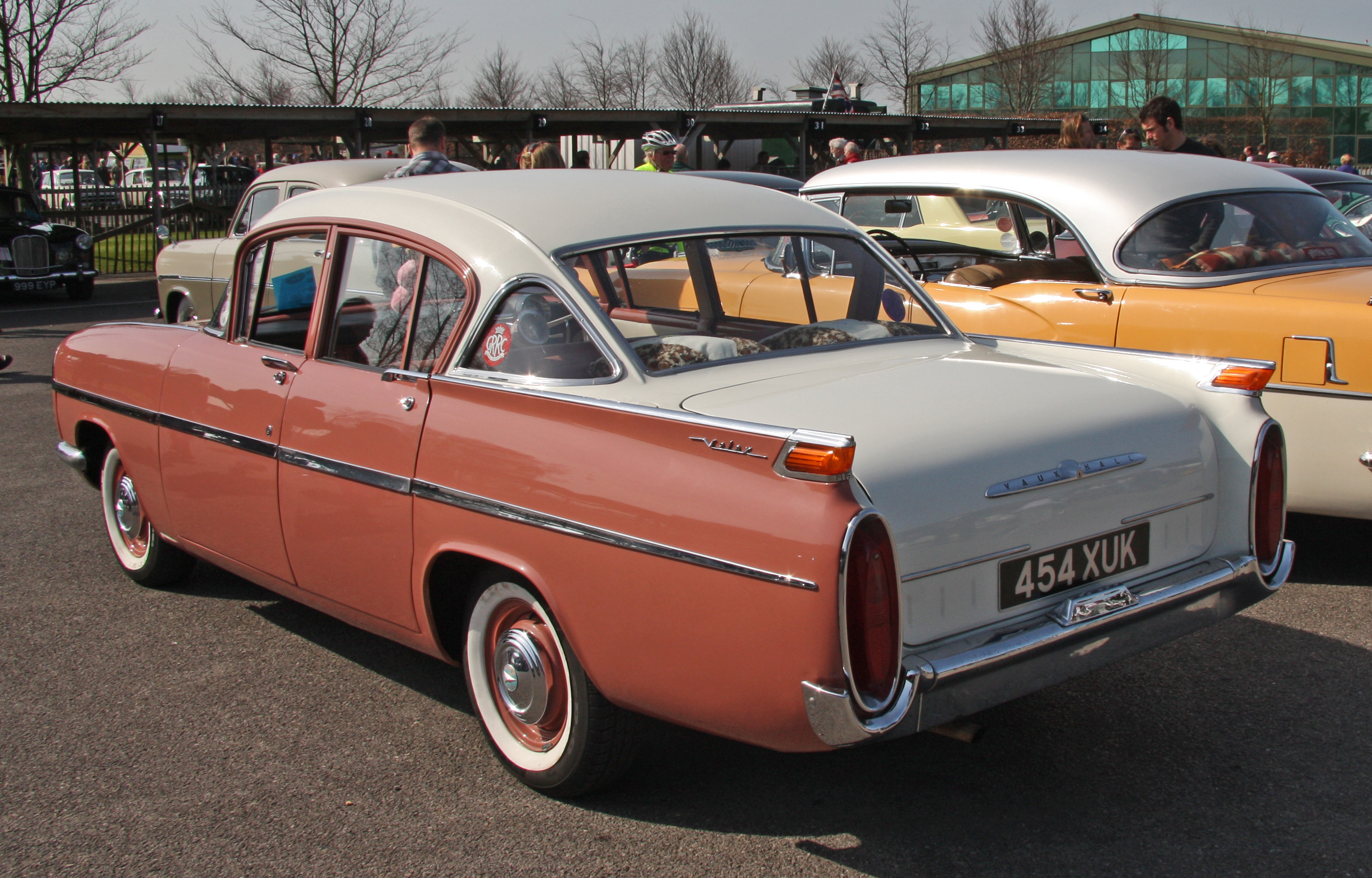
S saloon rear view

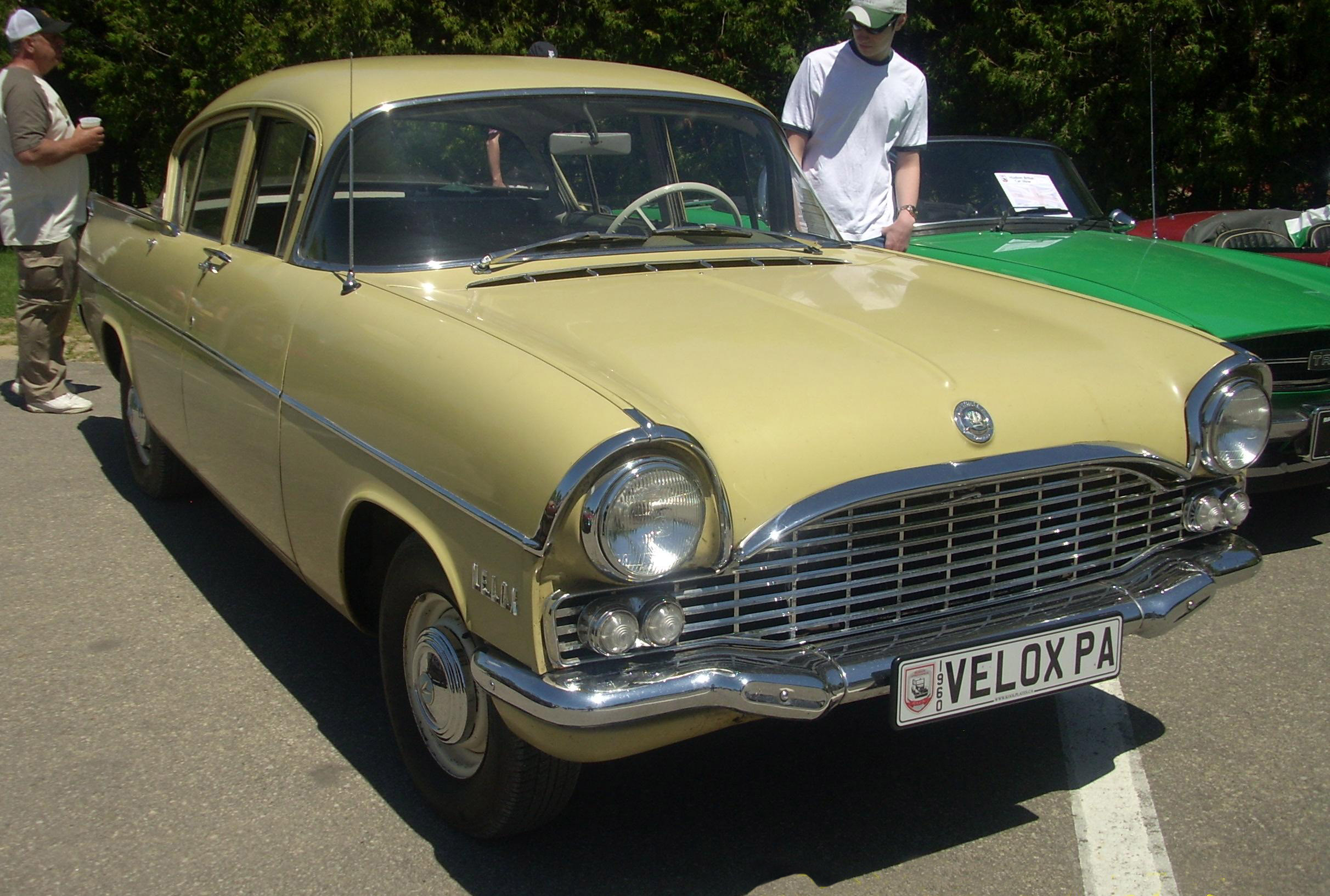
Vauxhall Velox PA SY Saloon

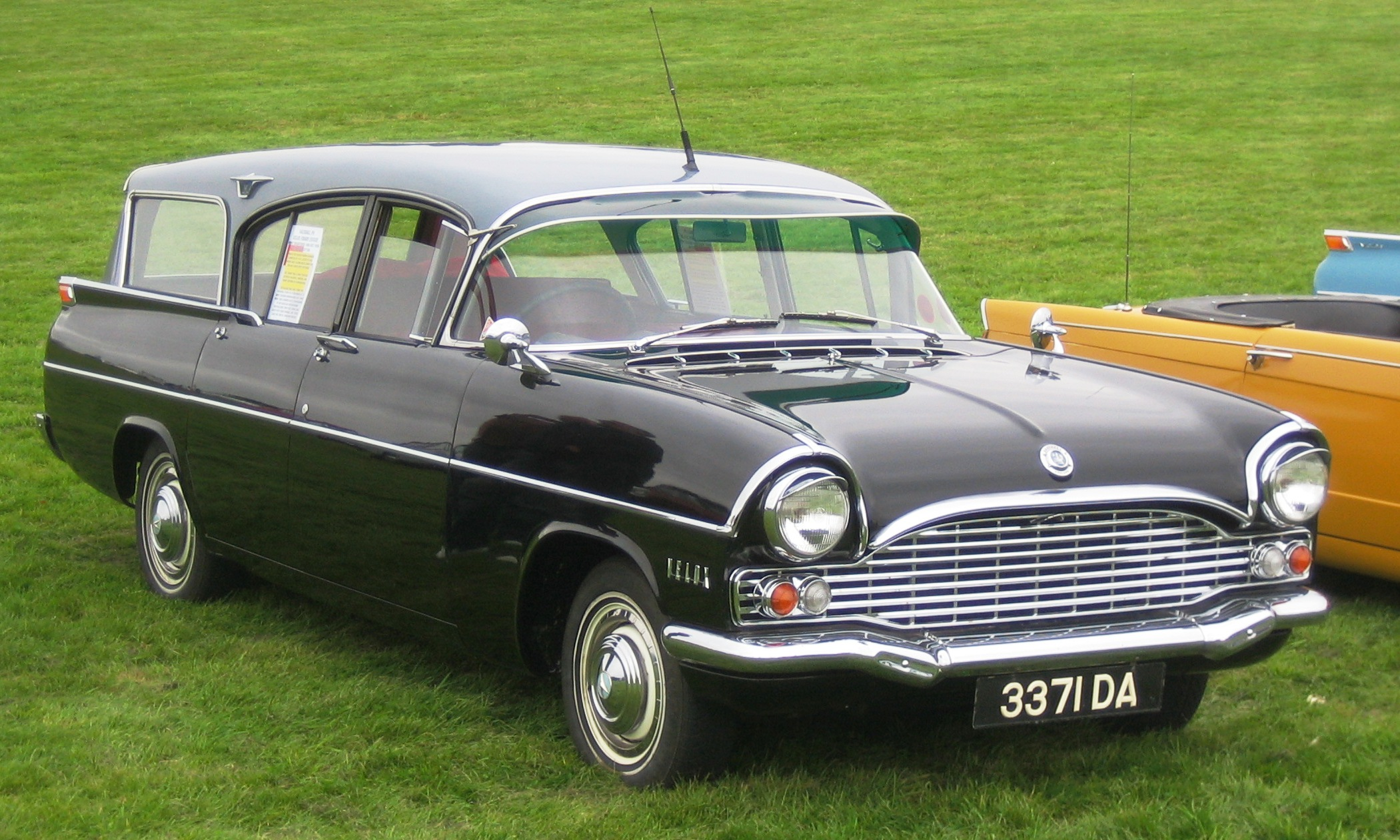
SY estate / wagon 1959

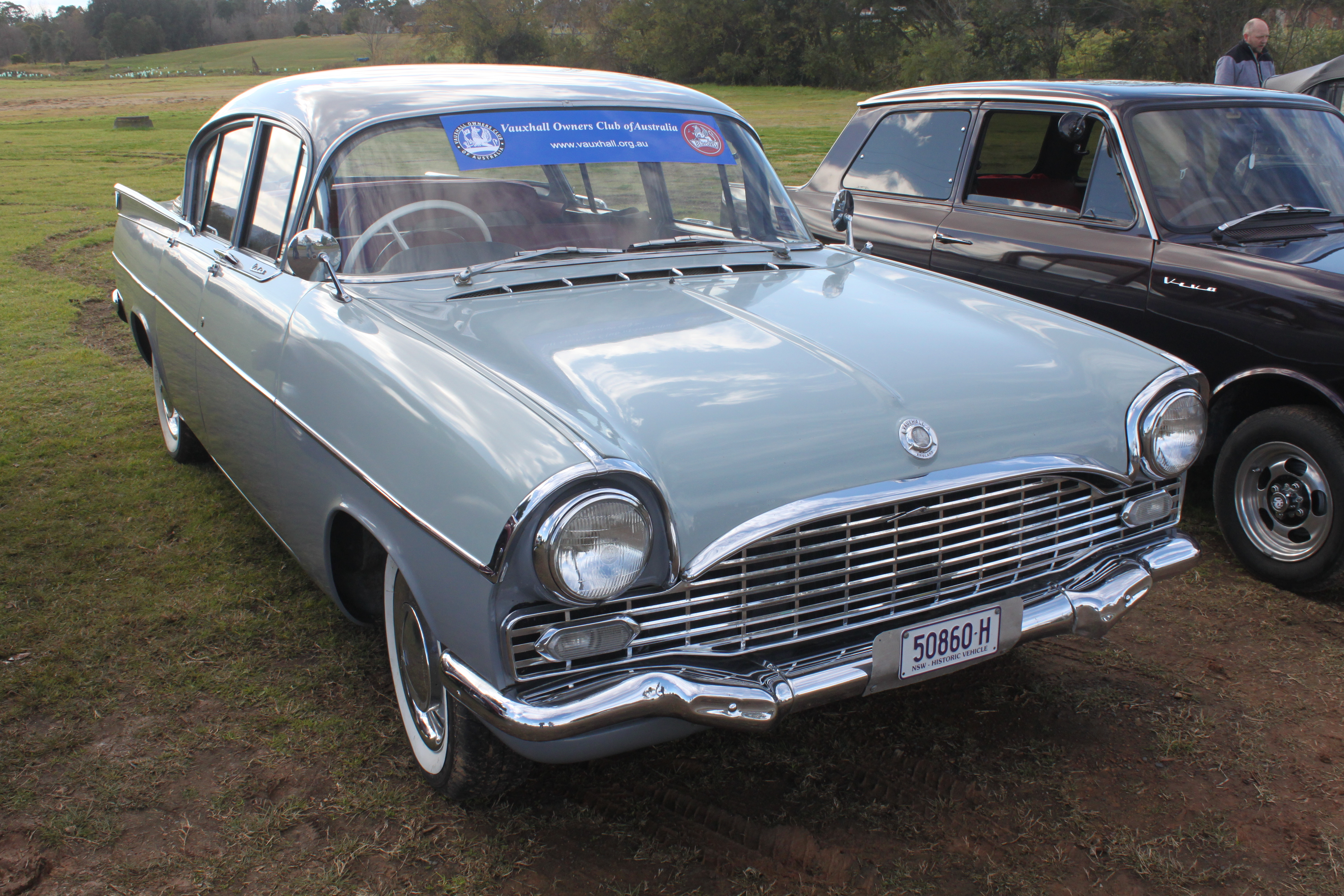
Vauxhall Velox PA SX Saloon

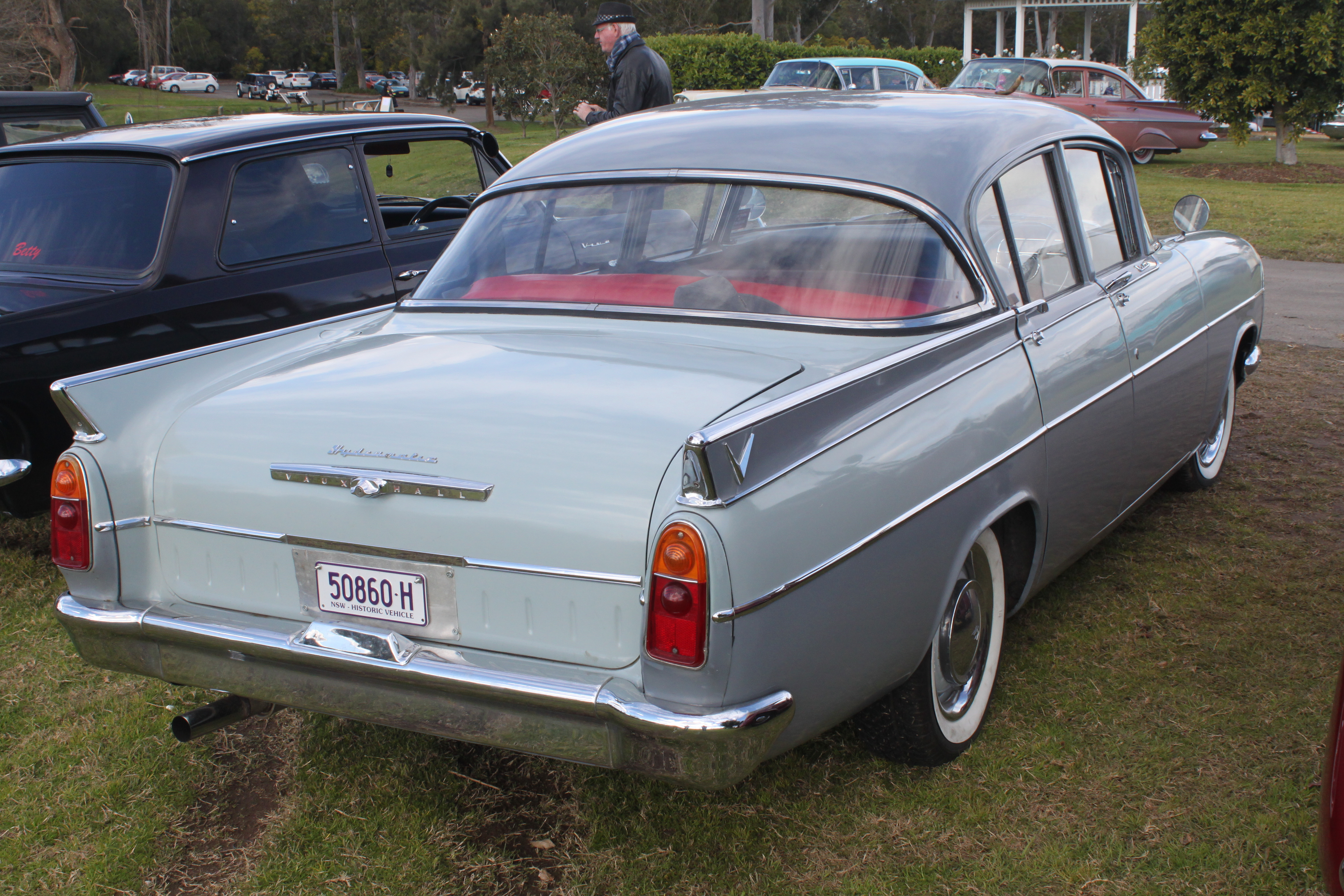
Vauxhall Velox PA SX Saloon

== Velox PB (1962–65) ==
Vauxhall Velox PB
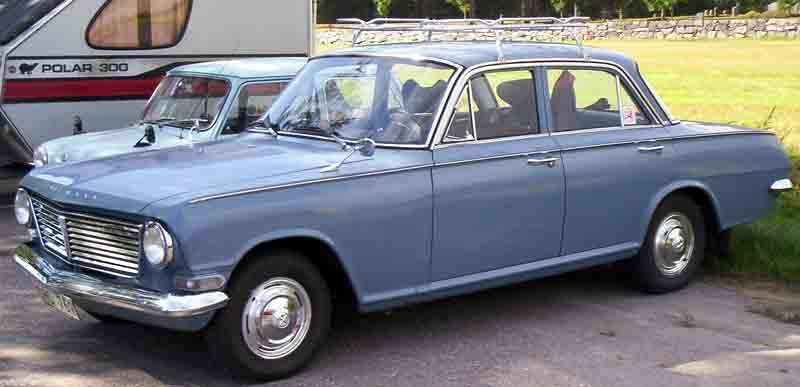

Overview
- Production: 1962–65
- Assembly: Luton, Bedfordshire, England; Petone, New Zealand; Australia

Body and chassis
- Body style: Four-door saloon Five-door estate car
- Related: Vauxhall Cresta PB

Powertrain
- Engine: 2,651 cc (161.8 cu in) I6 ohv 94.6 bhp (70.5 kW); 3,293 cc (201.0 cu in) I6 ohv 115 bhp (86 kW)

Dimensions
- Wheelbase: 107.5 in (2,730 mm)
- Length: 181.75 in (4,616 mm)
- Width: 70.25 in (1,784 mm)
- Kerb weight: 2,632 lb (1,194 kg)

Chronology
- Successor: Vauxhall Cresta PC Series

The final version of the Velox, launched along with the Cresta PB at the London Motor Show in October 1962, was well over four and a half metres long: it was the largest Velox ever built, longer and wider than the benchmark Ford Zephyr with which it competed in the UK. Taking its cues from the Victor FB introduced the previous year (and sharing the doors of the smaller car), the new car was stylistically more restrained than its flamboyant predecessor, the removal of vertical fins emphasizing the car's width. Power output was increased to 115 bhp (86 kW).

In October 1964 the Velox PB became available with a more powerful 3294 cc engine. The 2.6 was retained for some export markets in which government tax thresholds penalised buyers and users of cars with engine sizes above 2800 cc. The update also included a new full-width grille, new tail lights incorporating optional reversing lights, twin rear exhaust pipes, 120 mph speedometer (was 110), new interior trim and, towards the end of the run, a switch from three-speed Hydramatic (PNDSLR selector) to two-speed Powerglide (PRNDL). PB Velox models were again assembled at the General Motors New Zealand plant in Petone and special versions were again built for local traffic police. The 3.3 was particularly popular with these government customers.

October 1965 saw the introduction of the Vauxhall Cresta PC, equipped with that same 3294 cc engine. This time no Velox version was offered. Rather, the Cresta itself became the base model, with two headlights, complemented by the more luxurious Cresta Deluxe, with four headlights, and the vinyl roof Vauxhall Viscount with more luxurious trim and power windows.

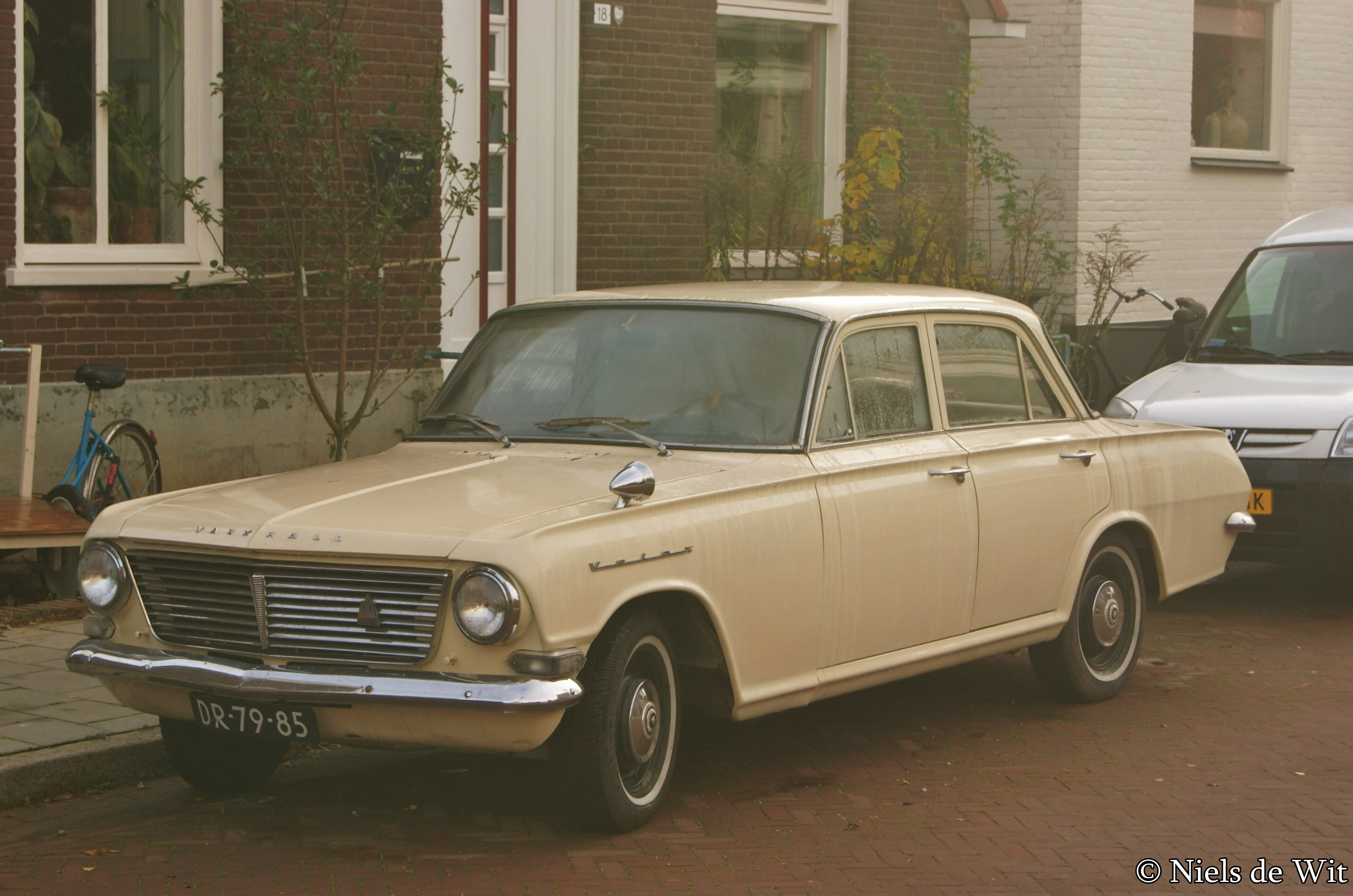
Vauxhall Velox PB Saloon (1962–64)

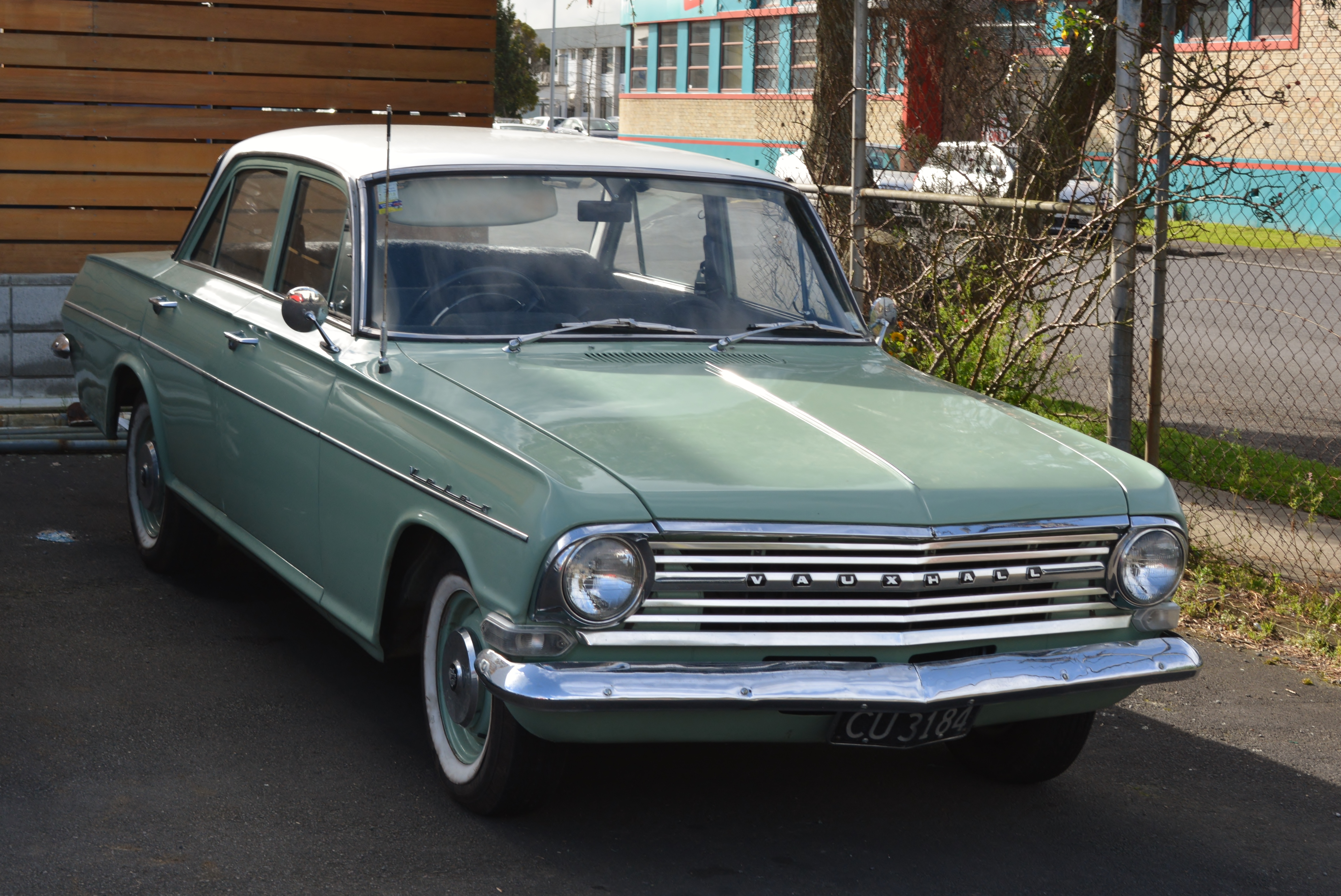
Vauxhall Velox PB Saloon (1964–65)
