= R42 =

R42 or R-42 may refer to:

== Roads ==
- R42 (Belgium)
- R42 (South Africa)

== Other uses ==
- R42 (New York City Subway car)
- HMS Undine (R42), a destroyer of the Royal Navy
- Junkers R 42, a transport aircraft
- R42: May cause sensitisation by inhalation, a risk phrase
- Sidolówka, a Polish hand grenade
- Spectre R42, a British sports car
