= London Motorfair =

Annual automotive and mobility exhibition held in London

London Motor Show
- Frequency: Annual
- Venue: Earls Court Exhibition Centre (1977–1999); Battersea Park (2016–2017); ExCeL London (2018–2019)
- Country: England
- Inaugurated: 1977 (re started 2016)
- Most recent: 2019
- Previous event: 16 May 2019 – 19 May 2019
- Next event: 26 February 2027 – 28 February 2027
- Website: londonmotorfair.com

London Motor Show, formerly the London Motorfair, was a motor show in England. It was held biennially at Earls Court Exhibition Centre, from 1977 to 1999. When the event won the support of the Society of Motor Manufacturers and Traders and P&O Events, in October 1993, the name was changed from the London Motorfair to The London Motor Show.

The London Motor Show was revived in May 2016, being held at Battersea Park, with Prince Michael of Kent as its patron. The event of 2017 also took place at Battersea Park, before it was moved to ExCeL London from May 2018 and continued in 2019.

The event of May 2020 was cancelled, due to the ongoing pandemic, and was scheduled to take place in July 2021, in Battersea Park but the 2021 event did not happen. An unrelated British Motor Show event took place at Farnborough.

The event will return under the banner of the London International Motor Show on 26-28th February 2027

The London International Motor Show (LIMS) is an automotive and mobility exhibition held at ExCeL London, in the Royal Docks, London. The inaugural edition is scheduled to take place from 26 to 28 February 2027.

== Background ==
London has hosted major motor shows since the early twentieth century, most notably the British International Motor Show, which ran under various names from 1903 until 2008, and later the London Motor Show, which operated from 2016 to 2019 before being cancelled due to the COVID-19 pandemic.

The London International Motor Show represents the return of a major international automotive showcase to the capital, some eight years after the final London Motor Show in 2019.

== Venue ==
The show takes place at ExCeL London, situated in the Royal Docks area of east London, close to London City Airport and with direct transport links to central London. The venue's international connectivity is considered central to attracting global exhibitors, media, and visitors.

== Format and content ==
The 2027 show is designed to combine elements of a traditional motor show with modern, interactive features. Visitors will have the opportunity to view production cars and concept models from major manufacturers, attend live demonstrations, and book test drives.

A central theme of the inaugural edition is the automotive industry's shift from internal combustion engines towards electrified powertrains, with exhibitors showcasing hybrid, plug-in hybrid, and battery-electric models alongside innovations in software, connectivity, and mobility services.

Writing in Auto Express, columnist Mike Rutherford compared the event favourably to the Geneva Motor Show, describing it as filling a significant gap in the European motor show calendar and welcoming the investment made by the show's organisers.

The show has also attracted international press coverage, with reports published in Italian, Turkish, Ukrainian, and Brazilian automotive media.

== Co-located events ==
The London International Motor Show takes place alongside two other automotive events at ExCeL London during the same dates: Motorsport Expo, described by organisers as the UK's largest dedicated motorsport exhibition, and Car Culture UK, focused on modified and aftermarket vehicles. The combined format is intended to broaden the overall audience and increase footfall across all three events.

== Industry reception ==
Coverage from specialist automotive trade publications including Motor Trader and Motor Trade News highlighted the show's lead-generation potential for manufacturers, noting that the event is positioned to attract fleet buyers and business decision-makers alongside general consumers.

The show has also been noted in the exhibition industry press, with Exhibition News covering the broader programme of three co-located motoring events at ExCeL as a significant boost to the venue's 2027 calendar.

Historical context for the show has been documented by automotive heritage sources including ConceptCarz.

== 2019 ==
The fourth London Motor Show took place at ExCeL London (for the second time since its revival) from 16 to 19 May 2019, once again it featured a zone entitled "Built in Britain", promoting engineering by the British, as well as a live drift experience hosted by Caterham Cars.

== 2018 ==
The third of the “relaunched” London Motor Show took place at ExCeL London (for the first time since its revival) from 17 to 20 May 2018, within the Royal Wedding. It featured a zone entitled "Built in Britain", promoting British engineering with exhibitors like Aston Martin, Bentley and JCB.

== 2017 ==
The second of the “relaunched” London Motor Show ran from 4–7 May 2017, again in Battersea Park, with forty exhibitors. There were four premiers in the United Kingdom

- Alpina B4 S
- David Brown Mini Remastered
- Kahn Vengeance Volante
- MG XS

== 2016 ==
The relaunched London Motor Show ran from 5–8 May 2016 in Battersea Park, with forty exhibitors. There were two premiers in the United Kingdom, and the launch of the prototype hydrogen car, Riversimple.

- Infiniti Q60
- MG GS
- Noble M600 (facelift)

== 2003 ==
Following the cancellation of the show of 2001, the show of 2003 was planned to be called the New London Motor Show, and was due to take place at Earls Court from June 19 to 29, but following the twelve month consultation process with the motor industry in Britain, the organisers decided to cancel the show in November 2002, due to lack of support.

== 2001 ==
The show of 2001 was scheduled to run at Earls Court between 17 and 28 October, but was cancelled in July 2001, due to difficult trading conditions.

== 1999 ==
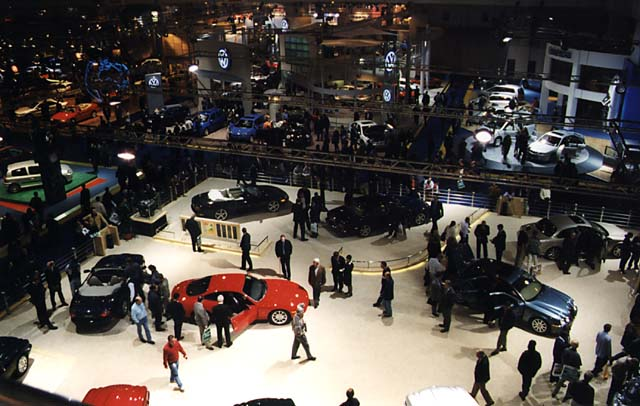
London Motor Show 1999

The show ran from 20 to 31 October, and included Classic Car Day (26 October 26) and special Motorsport Days (27–28 October).

- AC Ace V8
- AC Aceca V8
- Alfa Romeo 156 Selespeed
- BMW 318Ci
- BMW 320d
- BMW Z8 "007 The World is Not Enough"
- BMW C1
- Caterham Seven Superlight R500
- Daewoo Mirae Concept
- Daihatsu Cuore Custom
- Ford Fiesta Sport
- Ford Racing Puma
- Rover 25
- Rover 45
- Mazda 626
- Nissan Navara Double Cab "Lifestyle"
- Land Rover Defender Heritage
- Lexus RX 300 Luxury Concept
- Lotus Elise Type 49
- Isuzu Trooper 3.0 CT Commercial
- Jeep Wrangler "Yellow" Limited Edition
- Honda Accord Type-V
- Honda HR-V by Kelly Hoppen
- Hyundai Trajet
- Mitsubishi Lancer Evo VI Extreme
- Peugeot Boxer (facelift)
- Subaru Impreza P1 Prototype
- Toyota Land Cruiser Colorado (facelift)
- Toyota Picnic SE
- Toyota RAV4 "Giant"
- TVR Tuscan Speed 6
- Vauxhall Astra Coupe
- Vauxhall Astra 1.8 16v SRi
- Vauxhall Astravan Sportiv
- Vauxhall Brava Limited
- Vauxhall G90 Concept
- Vauxhall VX220 Concept
- Vauxhall Vectra Design Edition

== 1997 ==
- AC Ace
- Aston Martin V8 Volante
- Cadillac Seville SLS and STS
- Daewoo Matiz
- Honda Civic Station Wagon
- Isuzu VehiCROSS
- Kia Credos
- London Taxi TX1
- Land Rover Freelander
- Lotus Esprit Sport 350
- Mercedes-Benz A-Class UK debut
- Nissan Skyline GT-R V-Spec
- Seat Ibiza Cupra Sport F2
- Spectre R45 Concept
- TVR Cerbera Speed 12
- Vauxhall Astra Mark 4

== 1995 ==
- Alfa Romeo GTV
- Caterham 21
- Chrysler Neon
- Fiat Brava
- Ford Fiesta
- Lotus Elise
- MG F
- Nissan Almera
- Renault Megane
- Rover 200 (world premiere)
- Vauxhall Vectra
- Vauxhall Maxx (concept car)

== 1993 ==
- Audi RS2
- Fiat Punto
- Lister Storm
- Honda Civic Coupe
- Marcos GT Le Mans
- Peugeot 106 XSi
- SEAT Ibiza (three door)
- Spectre R42
- TVR Cerbera Prototype
- Vauxhall Tigra Concept
- Volkswagen Golf Jim McRae's Rally Car
- Volkswagen Vento VR6 Ray Armes' Rally Car

== 1991 ==
The 1991 Motor Show was larger than previous years, with the use of the new extension of Earls Court 2, opened by Princess Diana on 17 October for the Motorfair.

- Mitsubishi Space Wagon
- Peugeot 106
- Renault 19 Cabriolet
- SEAT Toledo
- Vauxhall Astra
- Vauxhall Frontera

== 1989 ==
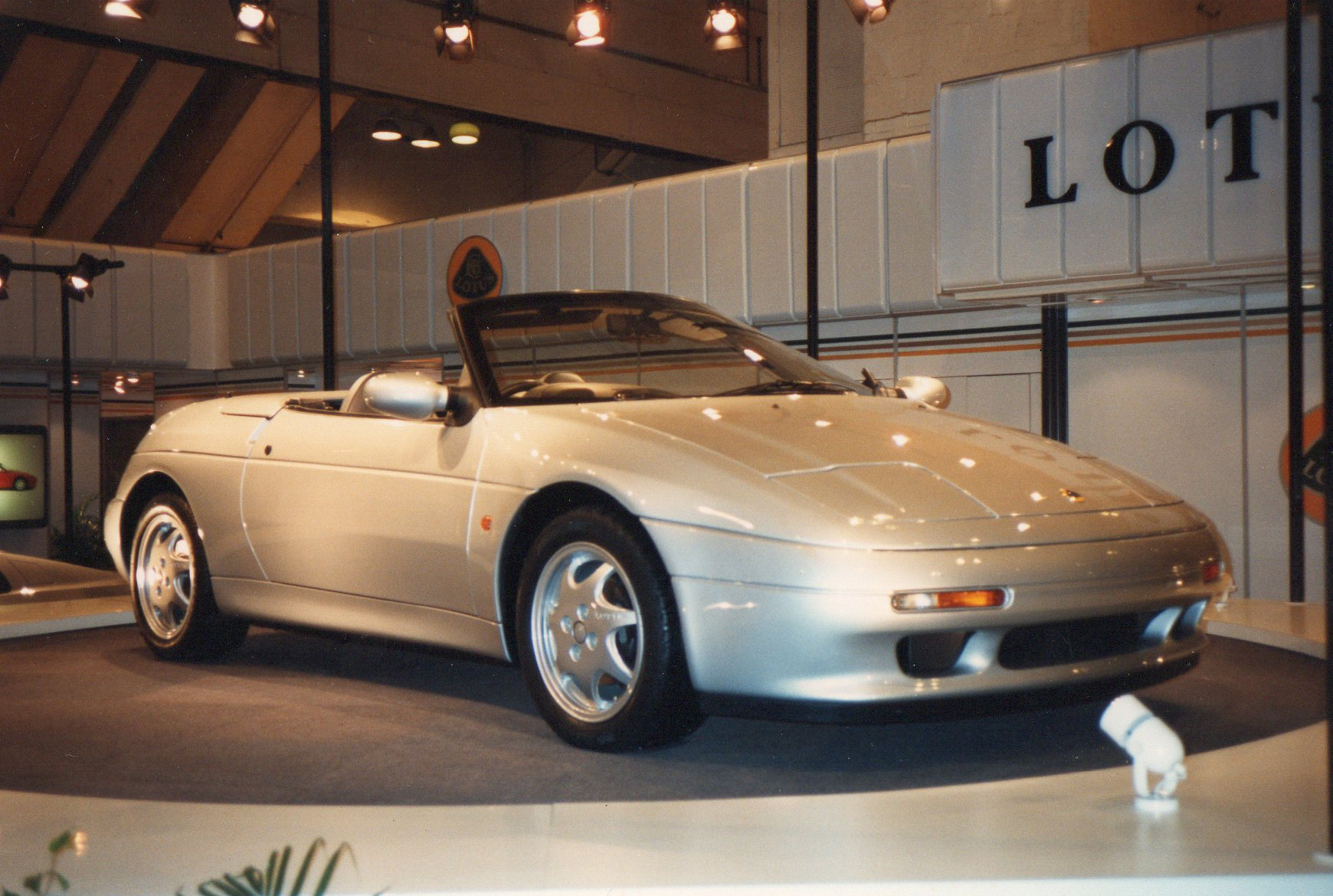
Launch of the Lotus Elan M100 at London Motorfair, 19–29 October 1989, Earl's Court

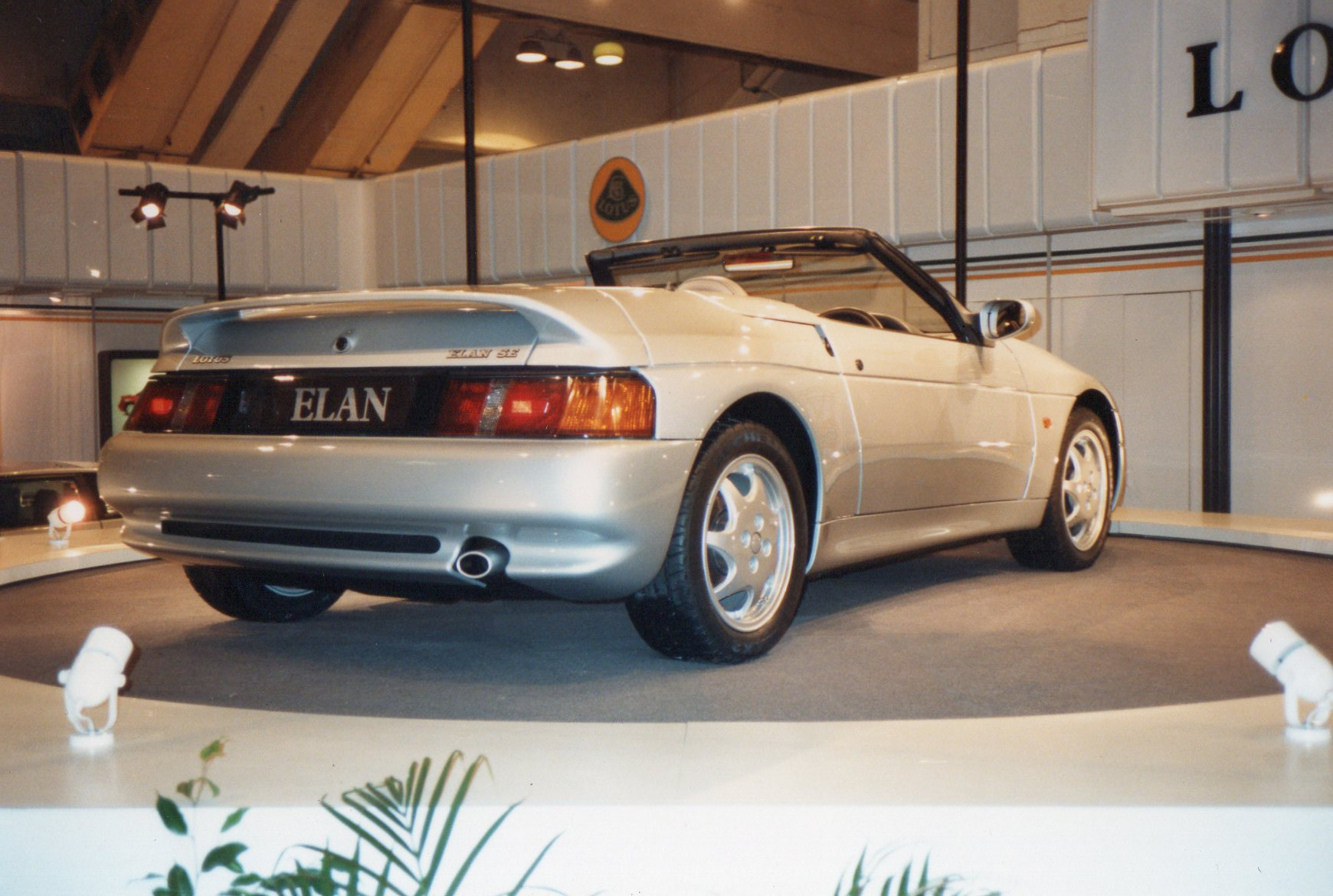
Same Lotus, same place

- Land Rover Discovery
- Rover 200
- Vauxhall Calibra

== 1987 ==
- Citroën AX GT
- Ford Sierra RS500 Cosworth
- Lotus Esprit
- Jaguar XJR-8
- Peugeot 405 Mi16
- TVR ES
- Vauxhall Astra GTE

== 1985 ==
- SEAT Ibiza

== 1983 ==
- Austin Metro Gala
- Austin Metro Vanden Plas
- Austin Mini Sprite
- Alfa Romeo Alfetta 83'
- Alfa Romeo Giulietta 83'
- Dutton Austin Mini Moke "Californian"
- Ford Granada 83'
- MG Maestro 1600
- Lotus Excel 83'
- Jaguar XJ-SC
- Jensen Interceptor Series 4
- Peugeot 205 5-door
- Peugeot 205 GTI
- Peugeot 505 GTI
- Renault 11 TL
- Renault 11 TSE Electronic
- Renault Fuego Turbo
- Tickford Aston Martin Lagonda
- Tickford Capri Turbo

== See also ==
- British International Motor Show
- London Motorfair
- ExCeL London
- Geneva Motor Show
