= Opel Manta GSe ElektroMOD =

Car model

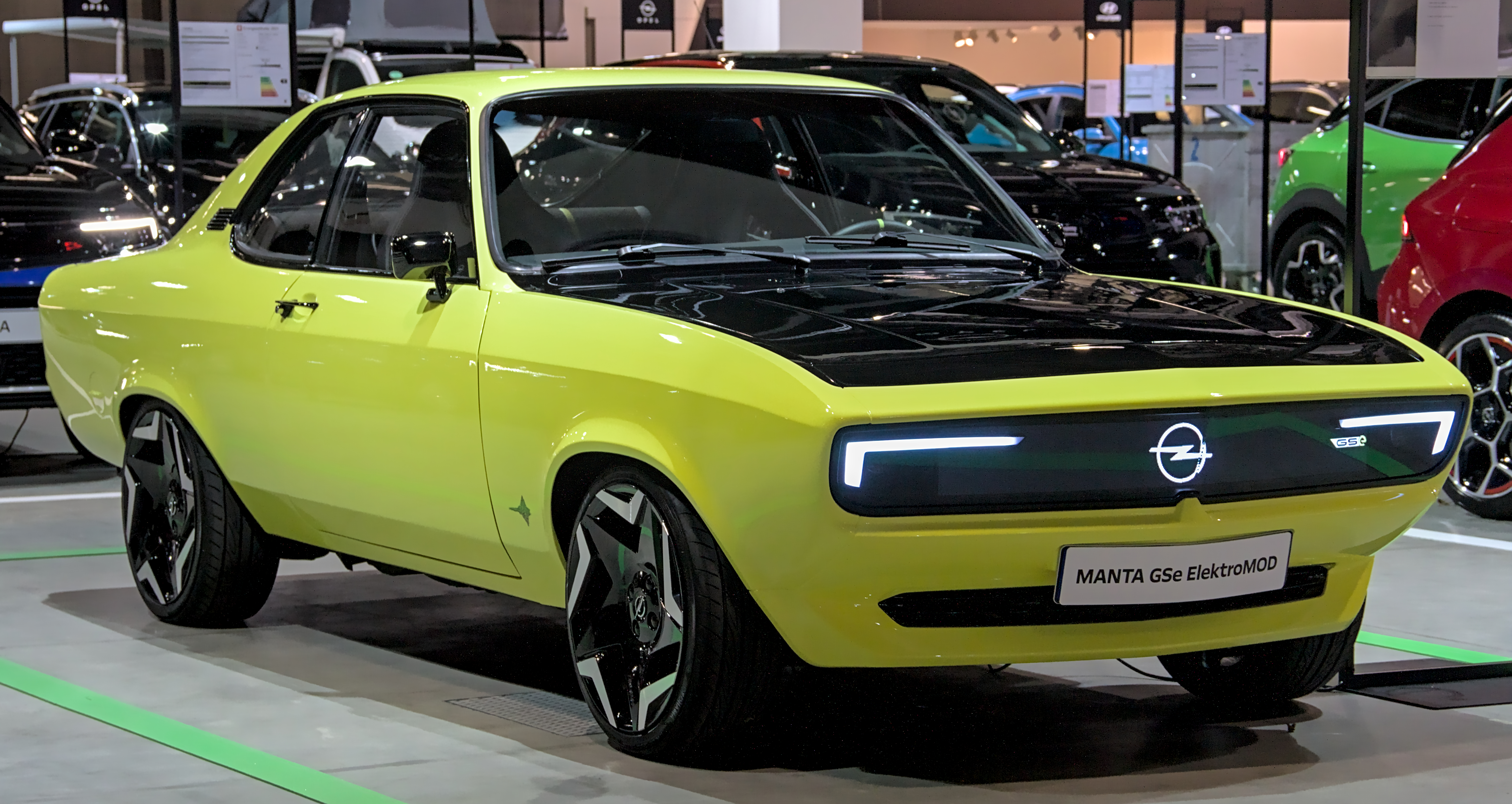
- The Manta GSe ElektroMOD in Zurich

Overview
- Manufacturer: Opel
- Production: 2021

Body and chassis
- Body style: 2-door coupé
- Layout: RWD

Powertrain
- Electric motor: Synchronous
- Transmission: 4-speed manual with selectable automatic
- Battery: 31 kWh lithium-ion
- Range: 200 km (120 miles)

Dimensions
- Curb weight: 1,137 kg (2,507 lb)

Chronology
- Predecessor: Opel Insignia

The Opel Manta GSe ElektroMOD is an electric redesign of the Opel Manta, with advanced technology. It has a "pixel visor" and a digital cockpit. Unusual for an electric car, it has a 4-speed manual transmission. Its primary colour is yellow, which is Opel's new corporate colour and this car includes 2 LED ultra-thin headlights. It is a 2-door coupe with two main screens in the interior. A screen has a speedometer, a tachometer and a fuel gauge, but it shows how much charge it has rather than fuel. The other screen is a SatNav.

On its grille, it can display "I'm on a zero e-mission", "My German heart has been ELEKTRified!" and "I'm an ELEKTROMOD". The grille is very similar to the second generation Opel Mokka and the Opel Crossland facelift. It is one of the first models under the new GSe sub-brand and it is limited to 150 km/h (93 mph).

The front suspension is more stiff and firm at the front of the car, however, the back of the car has a lot less stiffness, so that there is more traction. The 31 kWh lithium-ion battery is located a bit forward from the boot, and in the interior, it includes two seats in the front and two seats in the back, making it a four-seater. In the glovebox there is a switch to turn on recuperation, and the steering wheel does not have anything on it, despite a button for a horn, just like any car from the 1970s.

== History ==
The Opel Manta GSe ElektroMOD was first shown March 15, 2021, as a modern electrified Opel Manta, and it was later put on Opel's official website as a concept car. The Opel Manta was sold with a 4-speed manual transmission, it was called Europe's first affordable muscle car, but stopped production in 1988, and the electric concept of the Opel Manta was released 33 years later.

After the GSe was introduced, two new automobiles were shown: the Opel Manta GSe ElektroMOD and the Opel Astra GSe. It is said that the Opel GSi brand will go defunct in 2023, and for the GSe sub brand to take over.
