= Opel Maxx =

1995 concept car

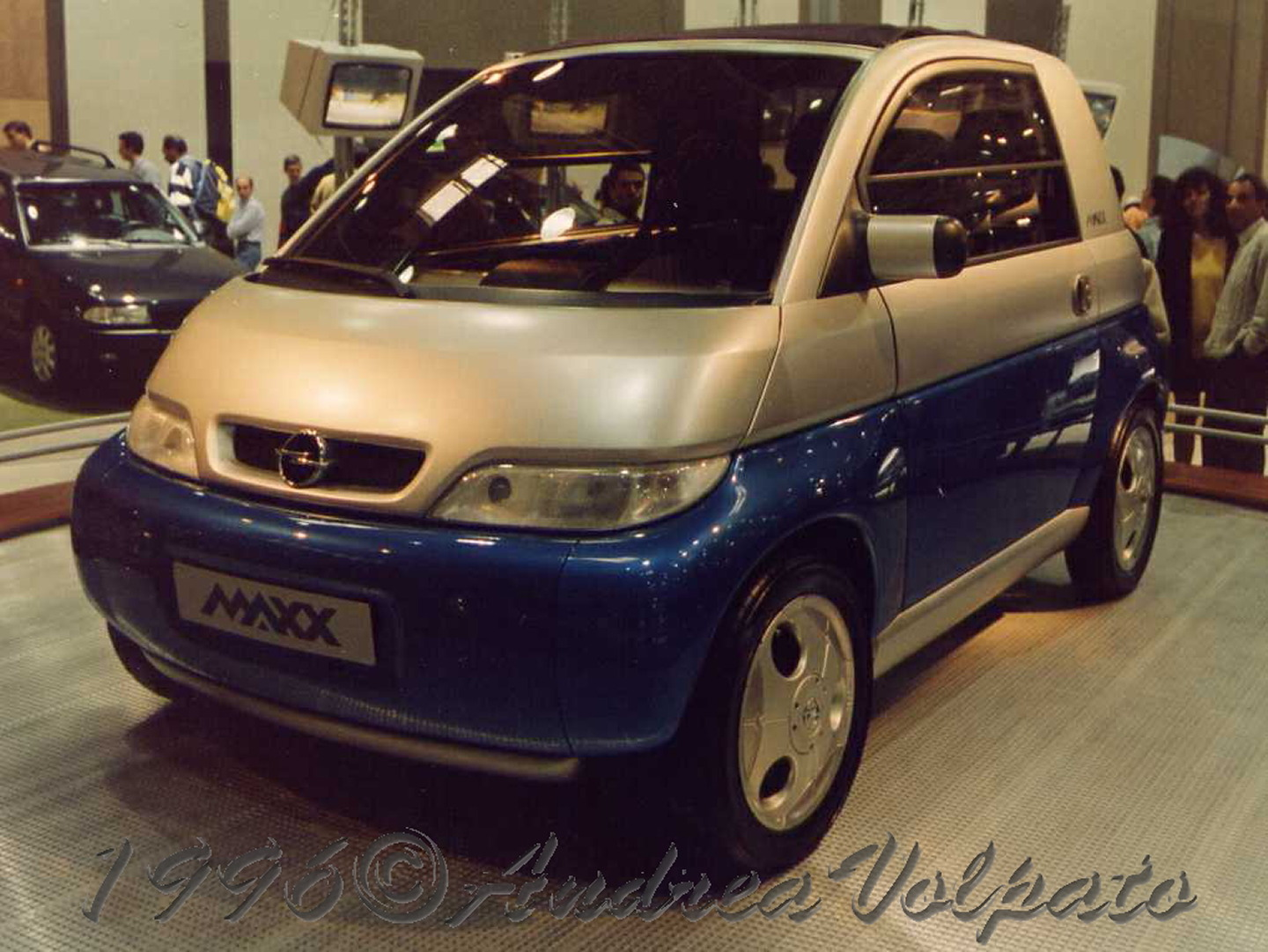
Opel Maxx Concept (1996)

The Opel Maxx was a concept car developed by the German car manufacturer Opel, presented at the 1995 Geneva Motor Show and as the Vauxhall Maxx at the 1995 London Motor Show. Not unlike the Smart Fortwo, The salient quality of the three-door, two-seater city car was its very compact dimensions, with a length 2,970 mm (116.9 in).

The Maxx 2 was shown at the 1996 Geneva Motor Show, with a new three-cylinder 973 cm^{3} (59.4 cu in) petrol engine, matched with a five-speed sequential gearbox.

The 1.0-litre engine produced 37 kW (50 bhp; 51 PS) and could accelerate to 100 km/h (62 mph) in 12.1 seconds. The Maxx was designed by Danny Larsen and Frank Leopold.
