= Spectre R42 =

Overview
- Manufacturer: Spectre Supersports Limited.
- Production: 1995–1998 (23 Units)
- Assembly: Poole, Dorset, England
- Designer: Ray Christopher

Body and chassis
- Class: Sports car (S)
- Body style: 2-door coupé
- Layout: Rear mid-engine, rear-wheel-drive
- Platform: Fibreglass body over aluminium honeycomb monocoque with steel subframe and steel rollover bars
- Related: Ford Mustang (fourth generation); Ford Fiesta (third generation)

Powertrain
- Engine: 4.6 L (4,603 cc) 32-valve 90° Ford Modular V8
- Transmission: 5-speed Getrag manual (6-speed transmission available as an option)

Dimensions
- Wheelbase: 2,489 mm (98.0 in)
- Length: 4,115 mm (162.0 in)
- Width: 1,854 mm (73.0 in)
- Height: 1,092 mm (43.0 in)
- Kerb weight: 1,550 kg (3,417 lb)

The Spectre R42 is a 2-seater mid-engined rear-wheel drive sports car manufactured by British boutique automobile manufacturer Spectre Supersports Ltd.

== History ==
Ray Christopher, associated with the GT Development firm, which was notable for building accurate replicas of Ford GT40 envisioned his own version of the GT40 of the 1990s. The R42 was the modern reincarnation of the GT40 and had similar layout, proportions and updated monocoque construction. The name R42 paid homage to the original GT40 (the height of the GT40 was 42 inches and R was the a breviation for the designer's first name Ray). The design incorporated elements from the famous sports cars of the time such as the Lamborghini Countach, the Jaguar XJR-15 and the Ferrari 288 GTO. The coefficient of drag of Cd=0.28 was considered the best in its class.

Ray's original intention was to create an endurance racing car which could emerge victorious at LeMans, just like the GT40. In order to achieve this feat, a limited number of road going examples of the car were required to be produced in order for the car to be homologated for racing.

Development of the car began in late 1992 and a scale model was built for wind testing along with a running prototype. The R42 was first shown at the 1993 London Motor Show held in October. However, the company went into receivership due to high development costs of the car and ongoing economic recession.

A take-over by the American company Spectre Motors Inc. led by GT Development's former sales agent Anders Hildebrand in March 1995, brightened the possibility of the R42 going into production. Anders brought the rights of the car for US$2.5 million and put it into production just four months later at a 12,000 sq. ft.production facility in Poole, a small town located in Dorset, England. Each car took 2,000 man hours to manufacture.

Anders reorganized production, brought in investors and involved Derek Bell as chairman and development consultant. He also launched the ALCO-Spectre racing programme, resulting in the development of the R42 GTR, the racing variant of the R42. The company sold the R42 for GB£70,000 each and only managed to sell 23 cars with most of the cars destined to Switzerland.

Quality issues would suffice and the choice of fibreglass over the originally planned carbon fibre along with poor fit and finish resulted in negative reviews. The automotive press also reprimanded the practice of borrowing parts from other cars for an expensive sports car (the R42 utilised the Toyota MR2's front indicators and door handles; Honda Legend's tail lamps and interior parts from the Ford Fiesta) along with the controversial rear design which incorporated a lot of cooling vents.

Anders then aimed to replace the R42 with a more potent R45. Two prototypes were developed and the second prototype (finished in yellow colour) was presented at the 1997 London Motor Show by actor Desmond Llewellyn with the production version scheduled to debut at the 1998 London Motor Show but the absence of sufficient funds for the car's development and other losses led the company into receivership.

== Specifications and performance ==
The chassis of the car consists of an aluminium honeycomb monocoque and a tubular steel space frame. The car has a fibreglass body, which gave it the final weight of around 1,550 kg (3,417 lb). The R42 utilised an all-aluminium 4.6-litre (281 cubic inches) Ford V8 engine (shared with the Mustang Cobra with 4 valves per cylinder which generates 355 PS (261 kW; 350 hp) and 317 lb⋅ft (430 N⋅m) of torque allowing the car to accelerate to 97 km/h (60 mph) from a standstill in 4.5 seconds and on to a top speed of 282 km/h (175 mph). The engine was mated to a 5-speed manual transmission having a Getrag transaxle with a 6-speed transmission available as an option.

The car had a weight distribution of 42% at the front and 58% at the rear because of the mid-mounted engine. The 17-inch OZ racing alloy wheels wrapped in tyres measuring 235/45 ZR17 at the front and 335/35 ZR17 at the rear provided optimum grip. The race-style independent suspension consisted of adjustable anti-roll bars at the rear, inverted wishbones, parallel radius rods, anti-roll bars; rising-rate coil springs and adjustable Spax gas telescopic dampers at the front and the rear respectively. The brakes were made by AP racing with 295 mm (12 in) vented discs front and aft along with four piston callipers at the front and rear and had servo-motor assistance.

The interior of the R42 had Walnut wood trim and Wilton carpets. Some of the elements of the interior were borrowed from the Ford Fiesta (such as air conditioning vents, starter motor etc.). The interior had anti-glare Alcantara combined with the leather upholstery and custom made gauges with the speed-o-meter reading 322 km/h (200 mph). The leather sports seats and pedals were adjustable to customer's specifications. Some complaints surfaced about the interior not having enough headroom. Visibility was considered to be good compared to other mid-engined sports cars of the time.

== R42 GTR ==
The R42 GTR is the racing variant of the R42. Introduced at the 1996 London Motor Show under the ALCO-Spectre racing programme, the car was built under FIA regulations to compete in the BRDG GT racing series and the 24 Hours of LeMans. The 4.6-litre V8 engine used in the road car was modified to generate a power output of 600 PS (441 kW; 592 hp) and was mated to a 6-speed sequential manual transmission. The car weighed a total of 1,000 kg (2,205 lb).

Despite being scheduled to compete at the 1997 24 Hours of LeMans, financial troubles among the company forced them to abandon the project and the car never went racing.

== Other media ==
The R42 had a starring role in the 1997 Ian Sharp film "RPM" where it plays the prototype eco-friendly sports car that leading actor David Arquette has to steal. The R42 also made an appearance in the 1998 racing game Need for Speed III: Hot Pursuit as a downloadable car.
