= Opel Twin =

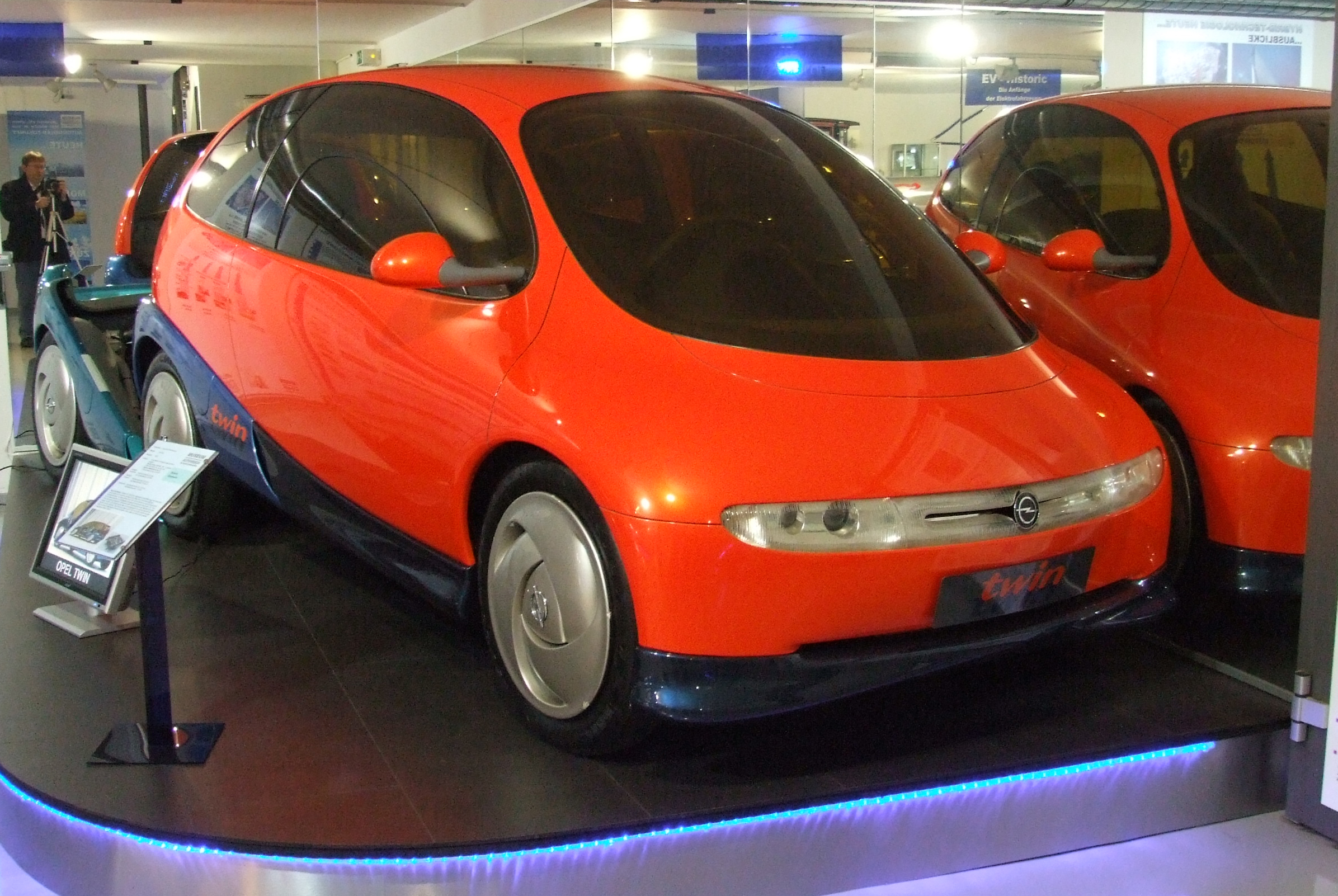
1992 Opel Twin (October 2008)

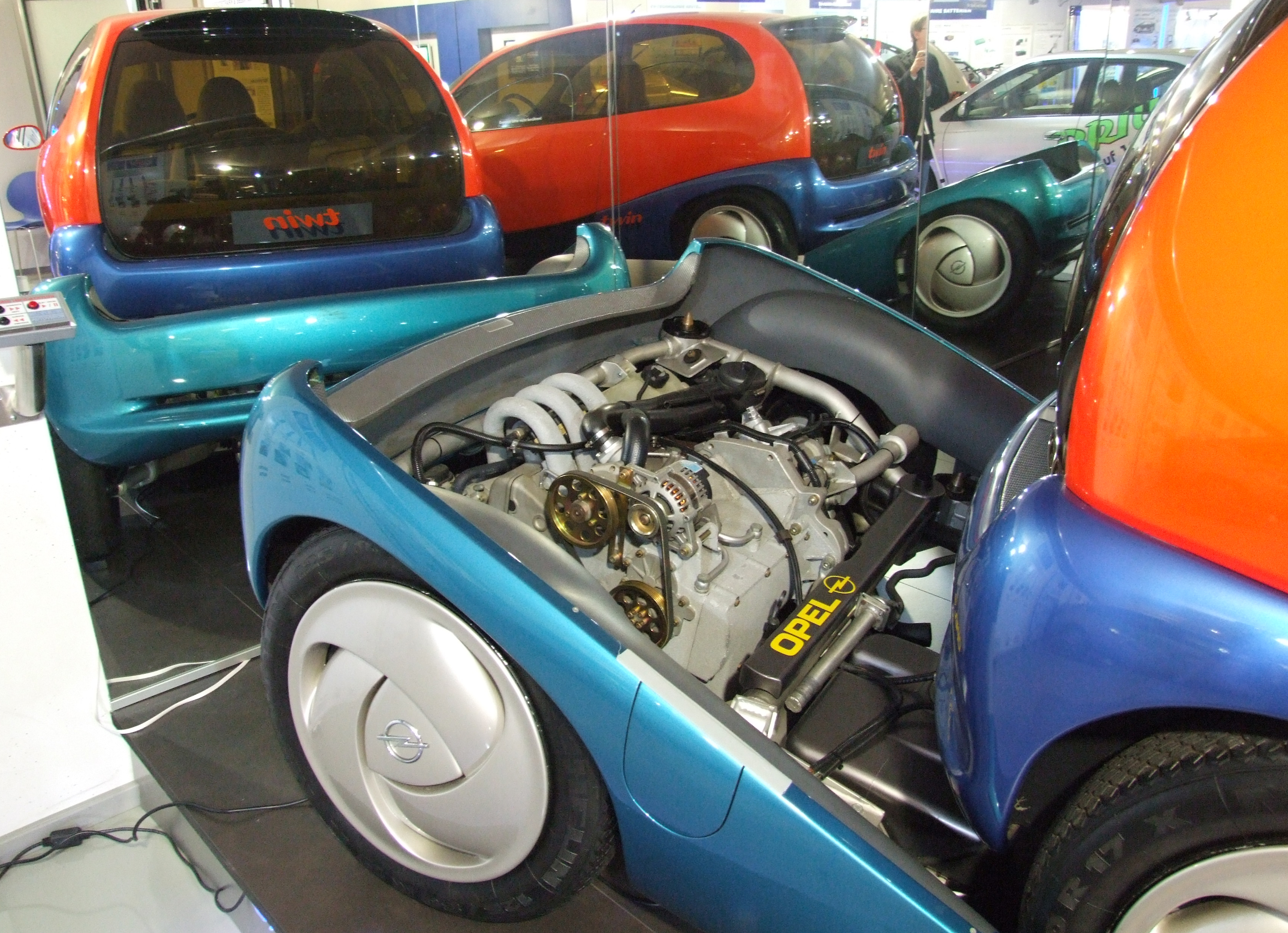
Opel Twin (October 2008)

The Opel Twin was a prototype vehicle built by Opel in 1991. It was an electric car with an exchangeable drive unit including the rear wheels. For an electric drive, the batteries and motors could be replaced by an internal combustion engine including fuel tank, gearbox and an exhaust system.

The electric drive consists of two 10kW engines and one 29kWh battery giving a range of 200km, The petrol drive had an 0.8-litre, 25kW-engine with a 20-litre fuel capacity, giving a range of 500km (3.5l/100km). The Twin's première was at the 1992 Geneva Motor Show.

== See also ==
- Opel Ampera
