= Opel Frogster =

Concept car built by Opel in 2001

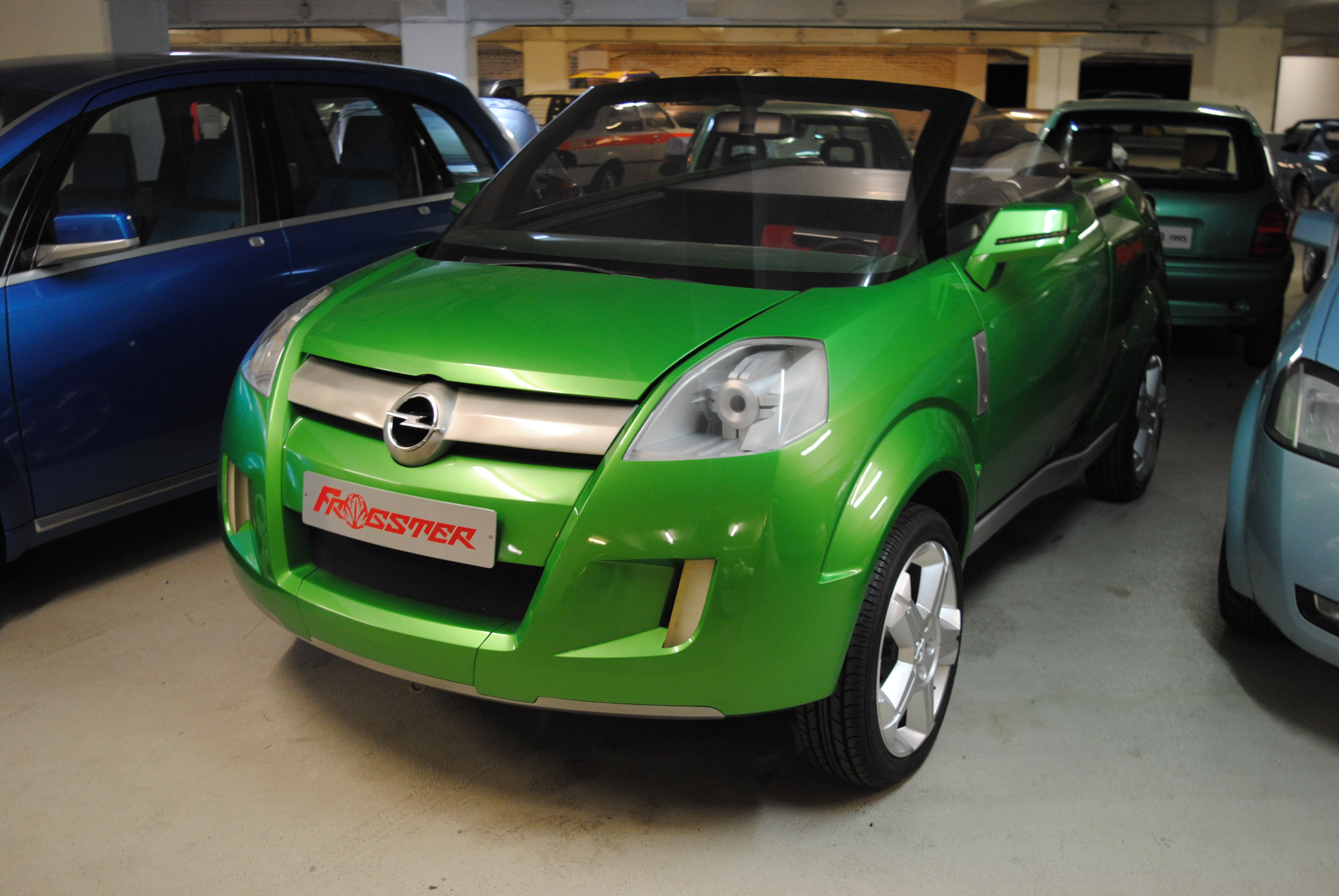

Overview
- Manufacturer: Opel
- Production: 2001 (concept car)

Body and chassis
- Class: Concept car
- Body style: 2 door 2+2 convertible / cabriolet
- Layout: Front engine, FWD

Powertrain
- Engine: 1.0 L X10XE ECOTEC 1.0 12V I3 (petrol)
- Power output: 58 hp
- Transmission: Easytronic automated manual

The Opel Frogster is a concept car built by Opel in 2001. It premiered at the September 2001 Frankfurt Motor Show. The Frogster could be transformed from a convertible to a roadster or a pickup truck by using a built in personal digital assistant (PDA), which was mounted between the two front seats. The Frogster was mainly targeted towards younger buyers. There have never been nor are there now plans for the Frogster to be released as a production vehicle.

== Technology ==
The Frogster contained new technology not yet used by any production car, including an electrically-powered convertable roof. A digital console between the front seats could control most of the functions of the car. It was unique because the car could transform into three different body styles: all-in-one roadster, convertible and pick-up.

== Heritage ==
The Frogster was named from an early Opel model from the 1920s called the "Laubfrosch". The Laubfrosch was nicknamed the "Tree Frog" by younger people, because of its bright green colour. When Opel designers were thinking of creating a new concept car, they were excited by the new Opel Speedster. Designer Stefan Arndt recalls: "Everyone knows how excited we all are about the Speedster. When we were working on this concept car, someone suddenly called out: 'Let's paint it green and call it the Frogster.' We all agreed it was perfect."
