= Wehrshausen =

- Borough of Marburg
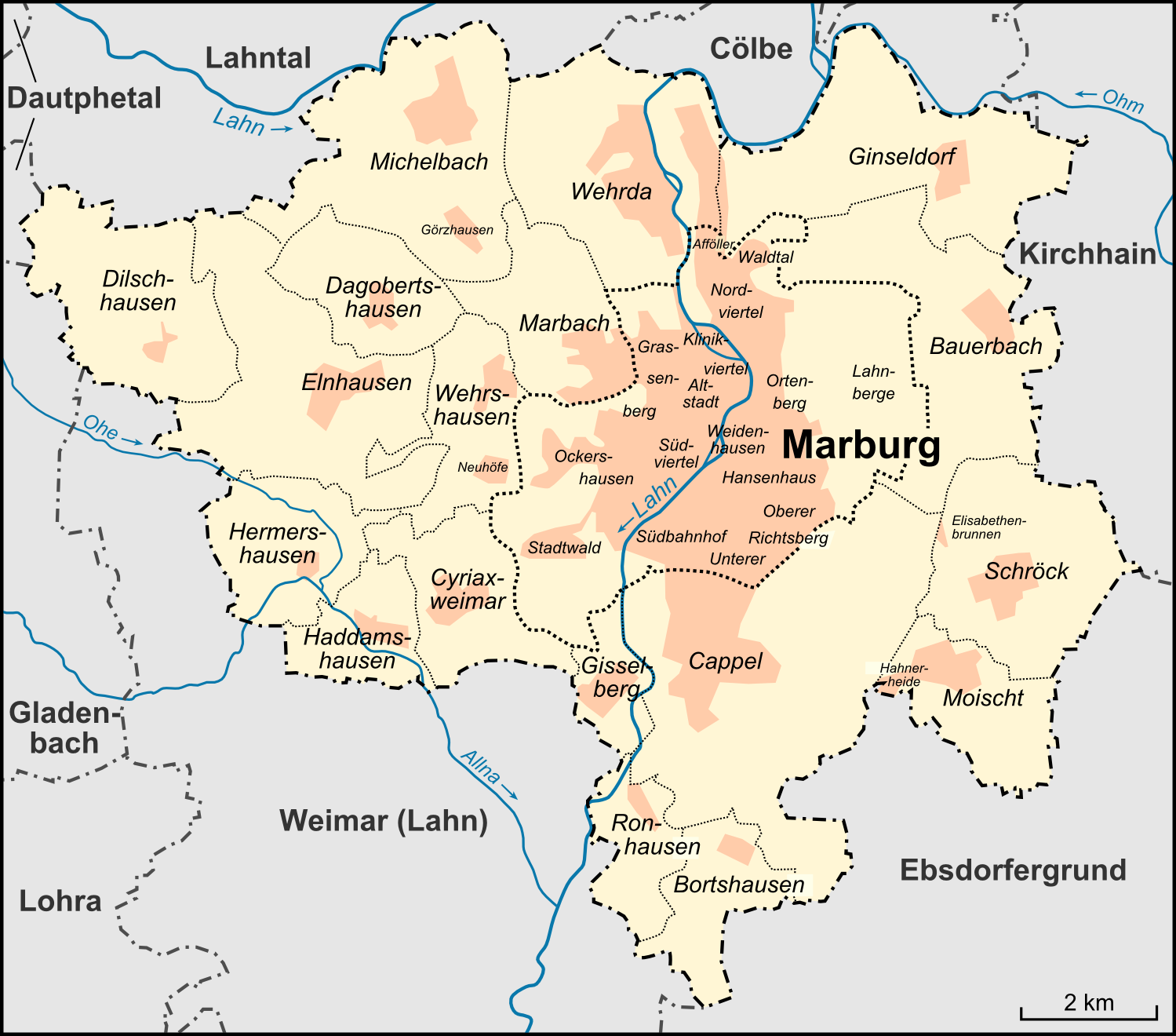
- Stadtteile of Marburg
- Interactive map of Wehrshausen
- Location within Germany Location within Hesse
- Coordinates: 50°48′42″N 8°43′35″E
- Country: Germany
- State: Hesse
- District: Marburg-Biedenkopf
- City: Marburg

Area
  - Total: 3.43 km^{2} (1.32 sq mi)
- Elevation: 302 m (991 ft)

Population (2019-12-31)
  - Total: 678
  - Density: 198/km^{2} (512/sq mi)
- Time zone: UTC+01:00 (CET)
  - Summer (DST): UTC+02:00 (CEST)
- Postal codes: 35041
- Dialling codes: 06421
- Website: www.wehrshausen.de

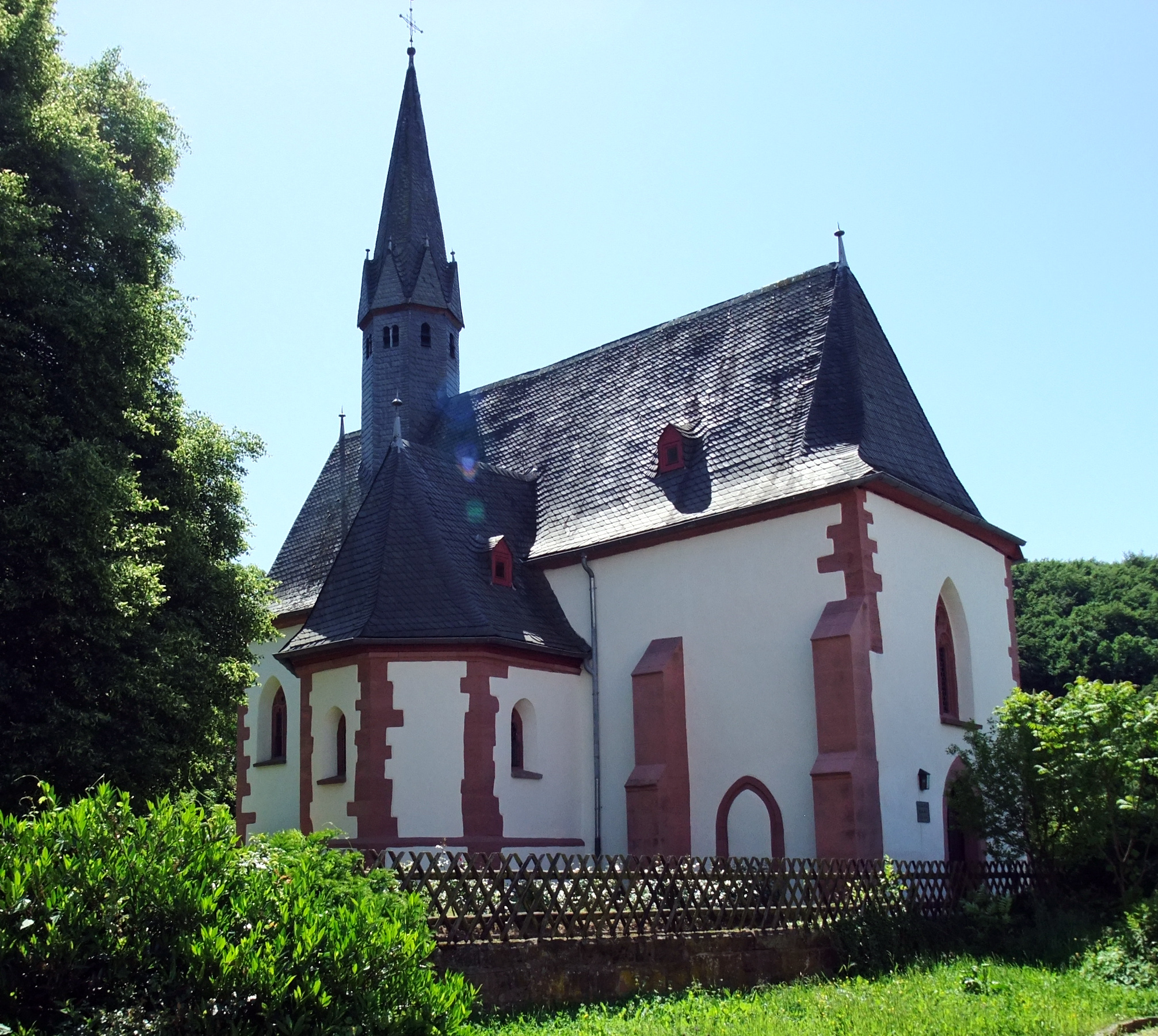
Wehrshausen church

Wehrshausen is a borough (Ortsbezirk) of Marburg in Hesse.

The 1st German Antique Police Car Museum is based there.
