= Opel Rekord Series A =

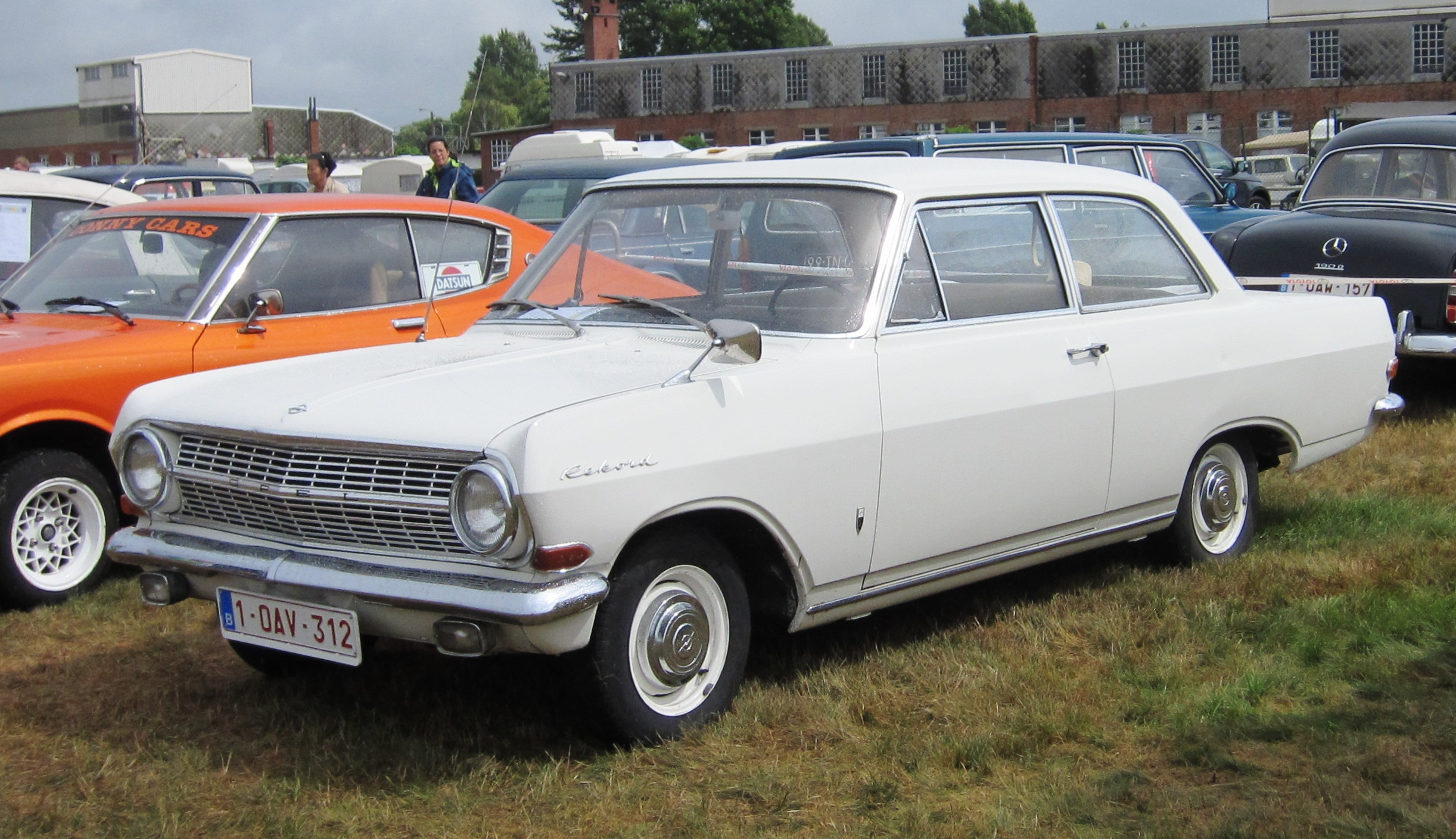
- Opel Rekord A 2-door saloon.

Overview
- Manufacturer: Opel (General Motors)
- Production: March 1963 – August 1965
- Assembly: Germany: Rüsselsheim

Body and chassis
- Class: Large family car (D)
- Body style: 2/4-door saloon 3-door estate 3-door van 2-door coupé

Powertrain
- Engine: 1,488 cc I4; 1,680 cc I4; 2,605 cc I6 (1964–1965)
- Transmission: 3-speed manual 4-speed manual

Chronology
- Predecessor: Opel Rekord P2
- Successor: Opel Rekord Series B

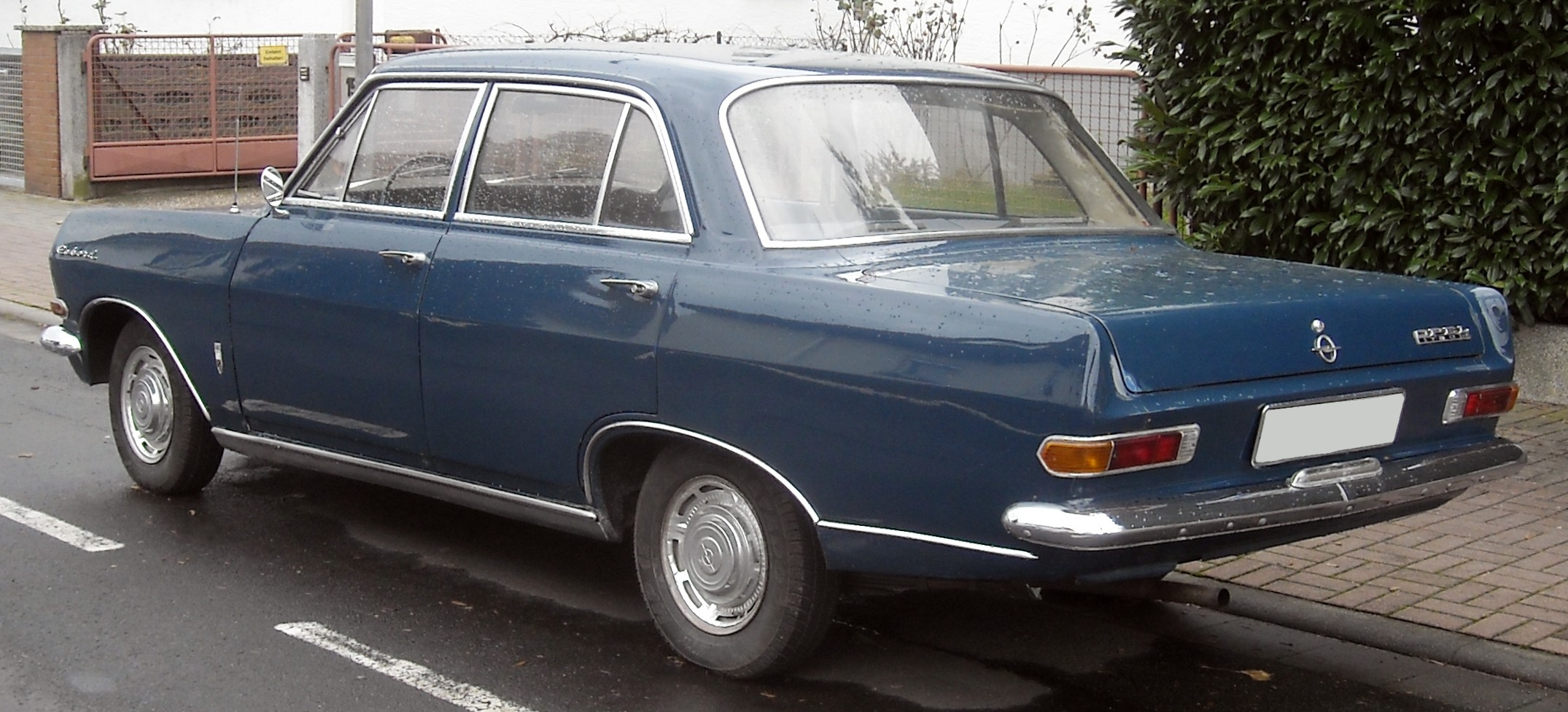
Opel Rekord A 4-door saloon

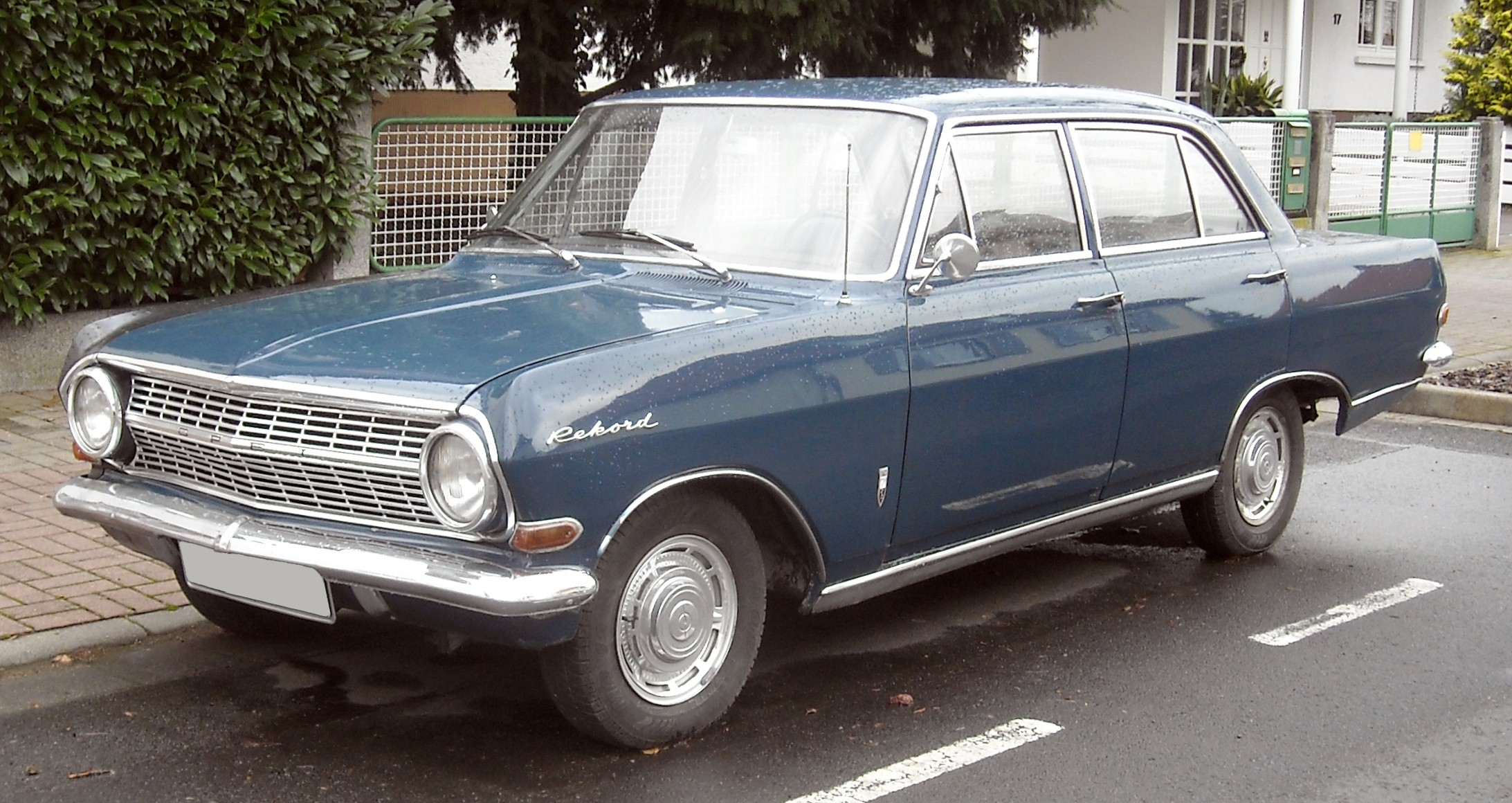
Opel Rekord A 4-door saloon

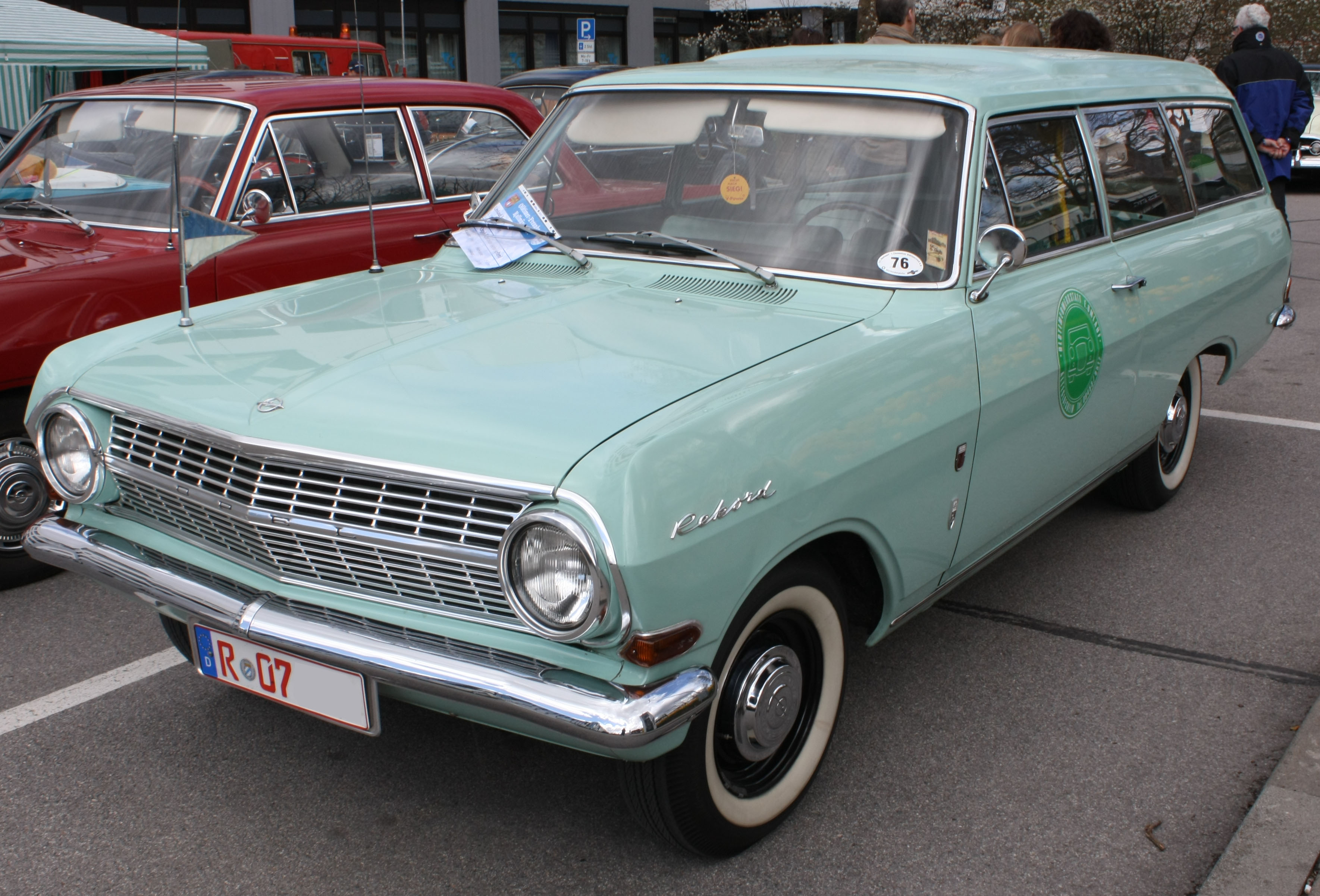
Opel Rekord Caravan 3-door estate

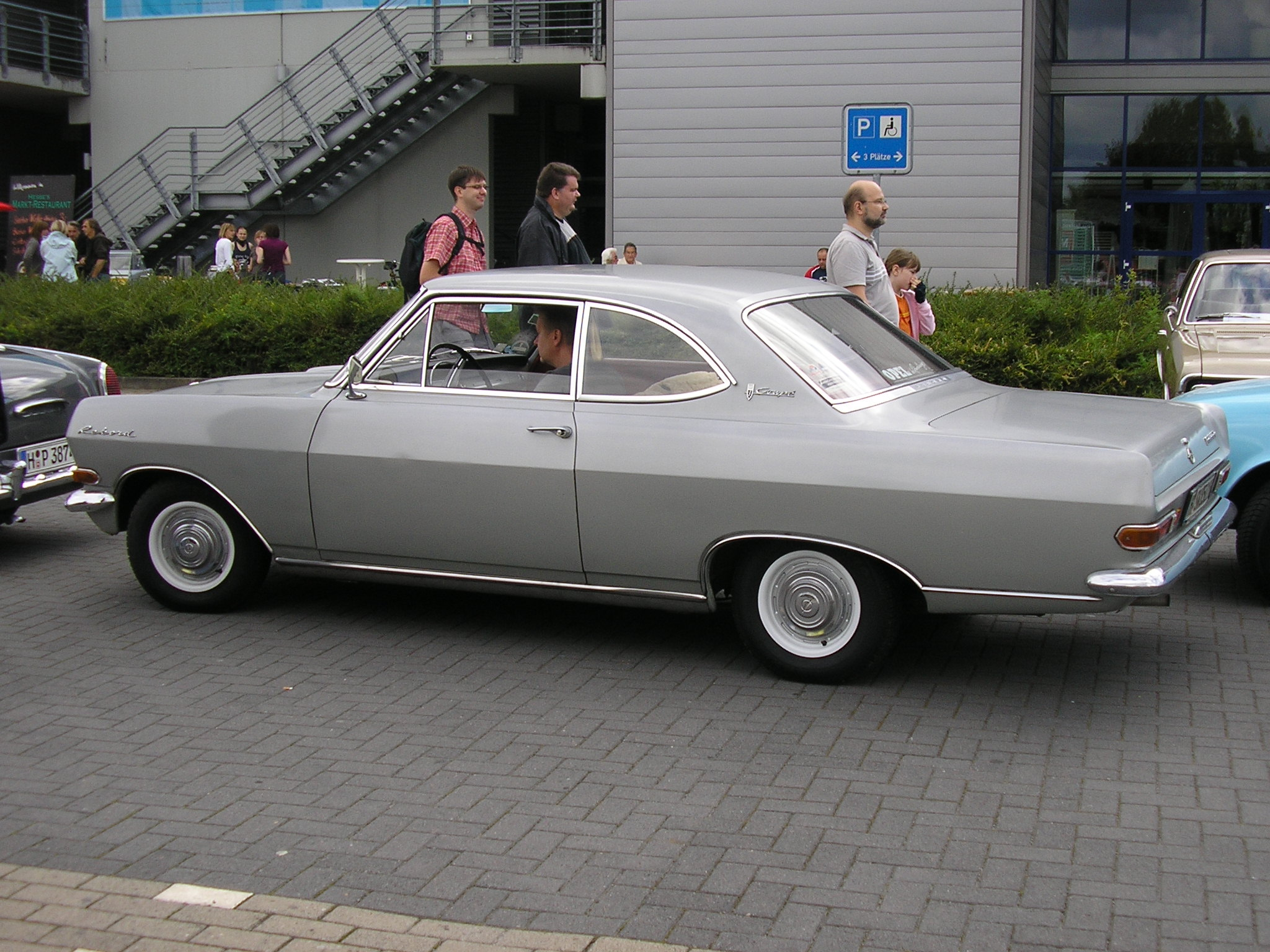
Opel Rekord A coupé

The Opel Rekord Series A is a large family car introduced in March 1963, by Opel as a replacement for the Opel Rekord P2. It was fractionally shorter but also wider than its predecessor with a wheelbase approximately 10 cm longer.

The Rekord (Series A) combined a stylish modern body with a range of engines little changed since 1937. In August 1965 it was replaced by the Opel Rekord Series B which from the outside was surprisingly similar, but which under the bonnet would introduce a new generation of four-cylinder engines that would power Rekords until 1986, when Rüsselsheim produced its last Opel Rekord.

== The car ==
The Rekord A that appeared in March 1963 was a robust response to the success of the Ford Taunus 17M. The design of the new Rekord sedan came not from Germany but from the General Motors Technical Center in Warren, Michigan, and was inspired by the successful Chevrolet II. It was styled to look slimmer and more sporty than its predecessor, but underneath its reassuringly clean design the Rekord A remained faithful to the trusted technical layout of previous models, from which the 1488cc and 1680cc four-cylinder overhead valve engines were taken, albeit now with an enlarged carburetter and claimed maximum power which even on the entry-level cars, came in at 55 hp (40 kW).

== The name ==
The original sales material named the car the Opel Rekord P3, which would have been a logical continuation from the previous model, known as the Opel Rekord P2. The decision to stress the newness of the design by calling it the Opel Rekord A was evidently taken very late in the day.

Until 1959 previous versions had been badged as Opel Olympia Rekords, and while the Olympia name had now disappeared from the car's official name, the word "Olympia" was still inscribed across the glove box lid in chrome script. The 1937 Opel Olympia had redefined the Opel range, being one of the first monocoque designs in Europe, and the company had tooled up to produce it in huge numbers. Evidently Opel were keen to keep alive the memory of the first Olympia.

== Body configurations ==
The relatively extensive range of body types followed the pattern of the predecessor model. The top seller was the saloon, available with either 2 or 4 doors. There was a "CarAVan" estate, but still only with three doors which was normal in Germany, although by now estates of this size produced in France, Italy, England or Sweden almost invariably came with a second set of doors for the passengers in the back. Opel also offered a three-door delivery van which was essentially identical to the estate except that the rear side windows and C-pillar were covered with a metal panel.

A coupé version was also assembled on the Rüsselsheim production line along with the Sedan and the CarAVan. The design, which heavily penalised rear seat head-room in order to provide a more stylish profile, was the work of Opel's German development team, working with the already finalised North American design of the sedan.

Cabriolet versions were also available. Based on the Rekord A coupé, these were conversions from the body builders Autenreith until they ceased production in 1964, and thereafter by Karl Deutsch. This approach made them much more expensive than the other cars in the range, and the cabriolet conversion was not offered with the smaller 1,488 cc engine. Very few Rekord A cabriolets were sold.

== Engines ==
=== Four cylinders ===
Unlike the modern bodywork, the 1,488 cc OHV four-cylinder water-cooled engine was very little changed since it had first been offered in the Opel Olympia back in 1937. Available minimum fuel octanes had been progressively increased since 1945, however, and even the entry level, now with a compression ratio of 7.25:1, now came with a claimed maximum power of 55 hp (40 kW) at 4,500 rpm. A 36 mm diameter carburetor, previously included on the larger four-cylinder engine, was now included across the range. In addition the 1680 cc four-cylinder version of the engine, first offered in the 1959 Rekord P1 was offered as an option now with 60 hp (44 kW) or, in return for a raised 8.0:1 compression ratio, 67 hp (49 kW) on the 1700S version of the engine. Torque was correspondingly increased on the more powerful engines. All the four-cylinder engines retained their side camshafts driving the cylinder valves by a combination of rods and rocker arms. By now the side camshaft four-cylinder engine was viewed as old fashioned, but over the years it had acquired a reputation for reliability.

=== Six cylinders ===
In March 1964, the Rekord A became the first Opel Rekord to be available with a six-cylinder engine. The engine in question was the 2,605 cc unit, shared with the newly introduced 1964 Opels Admiral, Kapitän and Diplomat. On all three applications maximum power output of 100 hp (74 kW) was claimed at this stage.

The new six-cylinder powered Opel Rekord L-6 had an advertised top speed between 163 and 168 km/h (101 - 104 mph) making it the first Rekord able to offer a top speed above 100 mph in non-metric markets (chiefly, in this case, the UK and the US). But the car was not an unqualified delight. Fuel efficiency slumped, the car needing 12 litres of "super grade" high octane fuel to cover 100 km. The six-cylinder engine was also heavy: there was no mention of any power-assisted brakes or power-assisted steering option on the Rekord A, the latter feature being reserved for luxury cars such as the Opel Admiral and Kapitän. Neither feature would have been expected at the Rekord's price level in Europe in the 1960s, but it was nonetheless noted that the Rekord L-6 was heavy to drive in slow urban traffic.

The six-cylinder Rekord L-6, along with the Admiral, Kapitän and Diplomat are also noteworthy as the first Opels to come with 12-volt electrical systems. Hitherto Opel customers, like Volkswagen customers and (until 1967) German Ford customers all had to make do with 6-volt electrics.

== Brakes ==
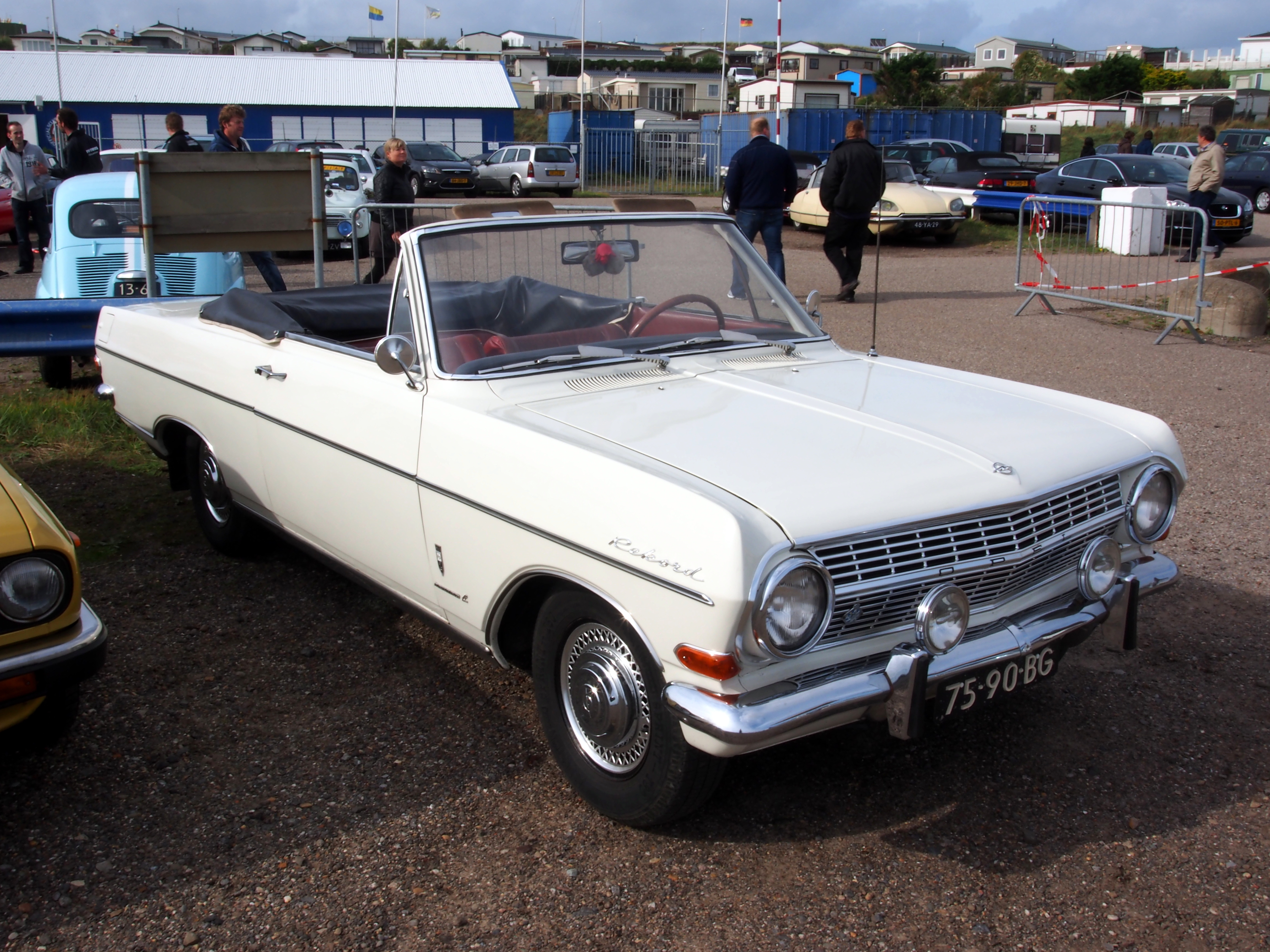
A 1966 Cabriolet conversion by Karl Deutsch

The four-cylinder Rekord A, like its predecessor, came with hydraulically controlled drum brakes all-round. 230 mm drums replaced the standard 200 mm diameter drums for the rear wheels of the CarAVan and panel van vehicles.

The six-cylinder Rekord, with its extra weight, came with front disc brakes included in the price, and the larger 230 mm diameter drums from the estate cars at the back.

== Transmission and running gear ==
The Rekord A took its three-speed all-synchromesh transmission from its predecessor, but this was now offered only with the 1,488 cc engine. A four-speed all-synchromesh unit was available as an extra on 1,488 cc cars and included in the price where a larger engine was specified. Although most cars continued to be delivered with a column mounted gear change, a floor mounted gear lever positioned between the front seats was also available. The option of an "Olymat" automatic clutch provided by Fichtel & Sachs was offered. The system was broadly similar to the Fichtel & Sachs "Saxomat" automatic clutch offered at this time by other German automakers. The 2,605 cc engine on the Kapitän and Admiral came with a new automatic gear-box, but no fully automatic transmission was offered with this engine when fitted in the Rekord.

Other principal mechanical elements on the Rekord A such as the suspension and steering systems were also lifted largely unchanged from the Rekord P2, and conformed to the norms of the time.

== Commercial ==
At launch the entry level the 1,488 cc two-door Rekord came with a domestic market manufacturer's recommended price of DM 6,830. At the other end of the range a factory built Rekord coupé L-6, powered by the six-cylinder 2,605 cc engine borrowed from the Kapitän, could be purchased for DM 9,310. Customers wishing to pay for a coach-builder cabriolet conversion would need to find DM 11,765 for a car with the 1700S (1,680 cc, 90 PS) four-cylinder engine or (from 1964) DM 13,060 for a six-cylinder Rekord cabriolet.

The Rekord A was produced at an annual rate slightly ahead of its predecessor. It was a commercial success. It was formally replaced in August 1965 after a 29-month production run during which 887,488 cars had been produced. As before, the nearest competitor in terms of price, size, power and target market came from Ford. The new Ford Taunus 17M was introduced in 1964 and during a three-year production run it would chalk up 710,059 units. The Opel Rekord would never challenge the smaller cheaper Volkswagen Beetle for top slot in the West German sales charts, but the success of the Rekord A and its successors ensured that the Rekord's market dominance within its own class was never again threatened by Ford Germany or anyone else.

== Technical data ==
Opel Rekord A (1963–1965)
Engine	1500 (1963–65)	1700 (1963–65)	1700S (1963–65)	L-6 (1964–65)
Motor:	Four-stroke straight-four engine			Four-stroke straight-six engine
Bore × Stroke:	80 mm × 74 mm (3.1 in × 2.9 in)	85 mm × 74 mm (3.3 in × 2.9 in)		85 mm × 76.5 mm (3.3 in × 3.0 in)
Displacement:	1,488 cc (90.8 cu in)	1,680 cc (102.5 cu in)		2,605 cc (159.0 cu in)
Maximum power:	55 PS (40 kW) at 4,500 rpm	60 PS (44 kW) at 4,300 rpm	67 PS (49 kW) at 4,400 rpm	100 PS (74 kW) at 4,600 rpm
Maximum torque:	106 N⋅m (78 lb⋅ft) at 2,000–2,600 rpm	120 N⋅m (89 lb⋅ft) at 1,800–2,400 rpm	125 N⋅m (92 lb⋅ft) at 2,200–2,900 rpm	181 N⋅m (133 lb⋅ft) at 2,400 rpm
Compression ratio:	7.25:1		8.0:1	8.2:1
Fuel feed:	Opel downdraft carburetor (licensed from Carter) with 36 mm Ø			
Valve gear:	Two overhead valves per cylinder, cam-in-block, pushrods and rocker arms			
Cooling:	Water-cooled			
Transmission:	3–speed or 4-speed manual, column or floor mounted shift		4–speed manual, column or floor-mounted shift	
Front suspension:	Double wishbone suspension with balljoints, coil springs, and hydraulic dampers			
Rear suspension:	Live axle with semi-elliptical leaf springs and hydraulic dampers — CarAVan has an extra leaf			
Brakes:	Hydraulically activated drum brakes, Ø 200 mm (CarAVan rear Ø 230 mm)			Hydraulically activated discs at front, Ø 230 mm drums at rear
Body and chassis:	Steel unibody chassis with steel body			
Track front/rear:	1,321 / 1,276 mm (52.0 / 50.2 in)			1,325 / 1,279 mm (52.2 / 50.4 in)
Wheelbase:	2,639 mm (103.9 in)			
Length:	4,512 mm (177.6 in)			
Unladen weight:	970–1,135 kg (2,138.5–2,502.2 lb)			
Top speed:	130 km/h (81 mph)	135 km/h (83.9 mph)	140–144 km/h (87.0–89.5 mph)	163–168 km/h (101.3–104.4 mph)
0–100 km/h:	23–25 s	21–22 s	17–18 s	13–14 s
Fuel consumption:	10.0–10.5 l/100 km 28.2–26.9 mpg_{‑imp}; 23.5–22.4 mpg_{‑US} (Regular)		10.0 l/100 km 28.2 mpg_{‑imp}; 23.5 mpg_{‑US} (Super)	12.0 l/100 km 23.5 mpg_{‑imp}; 19.6 mpg_{‑US} (Super)

== See also ==
- Opel Rekord
- Opel Commodore
