= Opel Rekord Series B =

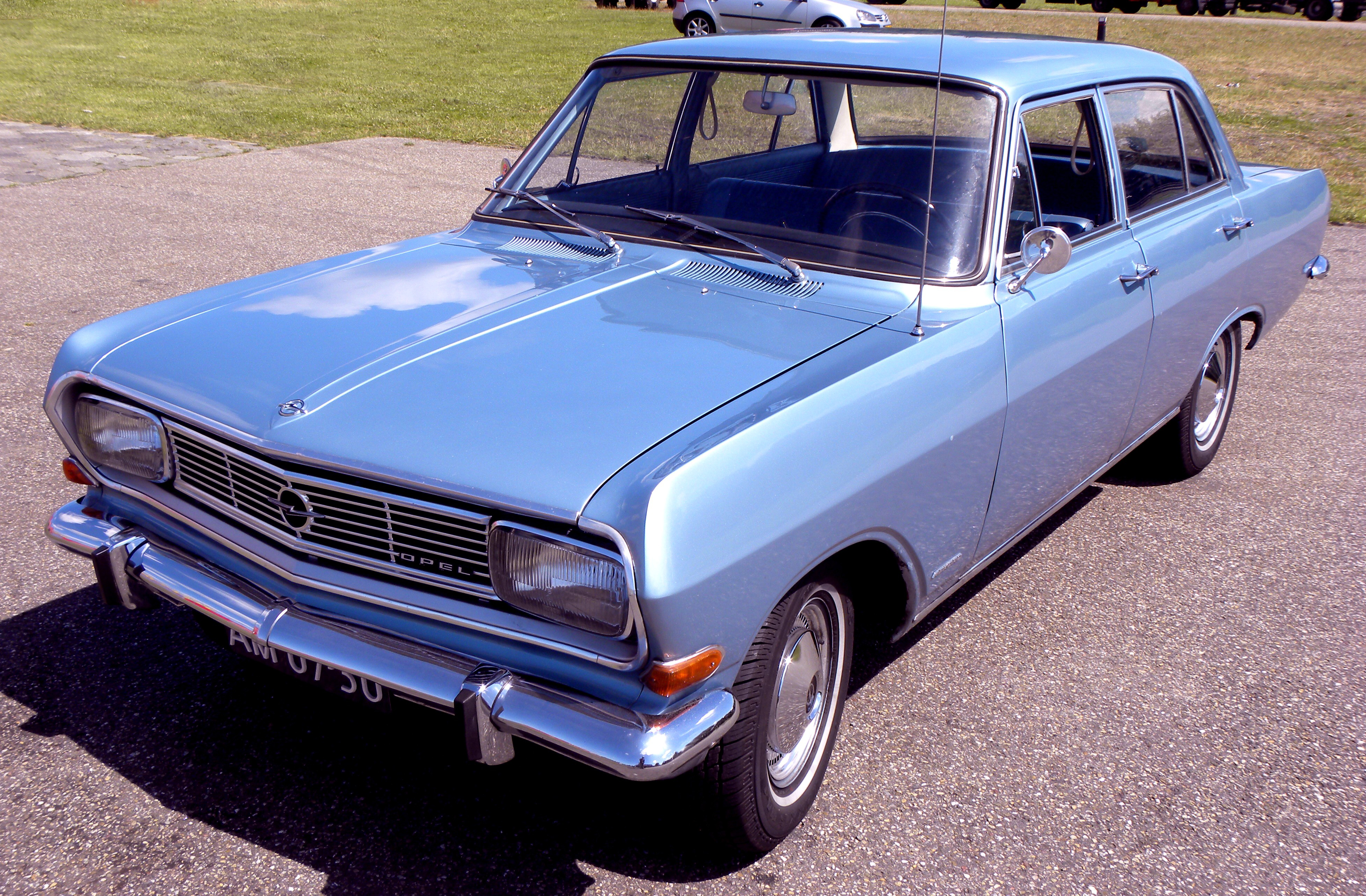

Overview
- Manufacturer: Opel (General Motors)
- Production: August 1965 – July 1966
- Assembly: Germany: Rüsselsheim

Body and chassis
- Class: Large family car (D)
- Body style: 2/4-door saloon 3-door estate 3-door van 2-door coupé 2-door convertible (Karl Deutsch conversion)

Powertrain
- Engine: 1492 cc I4; 1698 cc I4; 1897 cc I4; 2605 cc I6
- Transmission: 3-speed manual 4-speed manual (included with six cylinder engines and optional with others); 2-speed GM "Powerglide" automatic (optional with 1900S engined version)

Chronology
- Predecessor: Opel Rekord Series A
- Successor: Opel Rekord Series C

The Opel Rekord Series B is a large family car that was introduced in August 1965 by Opel as a replacement for the Opel Rekord Series A and stopgap until the delayed Rekord C was ready for sale. Produced only until July 1966, it shared the wheelbase and 1,696 mm (66.8 in) width of its predecessor, but the front and rear panels were restyled to give it a more modern appearance.

Previous Rekords were noteworthy for combining eye-catching new bodies with old-fashioned mechanicals, including a four-cylinder engine that dated back to 1937. By the 1960s the old engine was at long last being replaced in the Rekord B by a newly designed inline four-cylinder with a unique camshaft in head (CIH) configuration. This design, developed by Opel's parent company, General Motors, in Detroit, integrated the camshaft into the cylinder head, but aside rather than above the valves, making it still an overhead valve (OHV) rather than an overhead camshaft (OHC) engine. The unconventional valvetrain nonetheless offered a performance-boost for the Rekord, and was offered in a range of three displacements from 1,492 cc (91.0 cu in) to 1,897 cc (115.8 cu in). As the engine was developed further during the later 1960s, 1970s and 1980s increased torque was seen, resulting, along with the design's durability and inexpensive manufacture, in it surviving into the mid 1990s fitted to the Rekord B's distant successors, the Omega and Senator.

== History ==
Opel had originally intended to launch their new generation of four-cylinder engines in an all new model (which became the Rekord C), but as the scheduled 1965 launch date approached it became clear that other key elements of the design would not be ready. With the marketing department and dealers geared up for a new model, the decision was taken to present the new engines in updated, transition bodywork. The resulting Rekord B received (then highly unusual) rectangular headlights and certain brightwork themes of the coming Rekord C, but little else in common in styling. The Rekord B received four bold round tail light units similar to those planned for the forthcoming Opel GT. The interior design and even the colour and trim options were largely carried over from the Rekord A. The new model was produced between late summer 1965 and mid-summer 1966, replaced on the Opel production line during the annual vacation shut-down by the Rekord C, which began to roll of it by August.

At launch the entry level 1492cc two door Rekord came with a domestic market manufacturer's recommended price of DM 6,980. At the other end of the range a factory built Rekord coupé L-6, powered by the six cylinder 2,605cc engine borrowed from the Kapitän, could be purchased for DM 9,570. Power assisted brakes were available for an extra DM 95, which was also the cost for specifying a four speed gear box in place of the standard three speed transmission. Rekord 1900S customers wishing to specify and pay for the GM Power-gilde two speed automatic transmission were required to find an extra DM 950.

The Rekord B was produced between 1965 and 1966 for approximately ten months. During this period, 296,627 were produced. As before, the nearest competitor in terms of price, size, power and target market came from Ford. A new Ford Taunus 17M was introduced in 1964 and during its three-year production run it chalked up a total of 710,059 units. The Opel Rekord would never challenge the smaller cheaper Volkswagen Beetle for top slot in the West German sales charts, but the success of the Rekord B and its successors ensured that the Rekord's sales chart dominance in its own class was never again threatened by Ford Germany or anyone else.

=== Opel Olympia ===
Earlier models had carried the name "Opel Olympia Rekord", and although this had been shortened to "Opel Rekord" in 1959, Opel retained an attachment to the Olympia name. The body and 1.5-litre engine of the Opel Rekord B also featured in a cut price model badged as the "Opel Olympia". This came with only a basic specification, along with the smallest of the Rekord engines and a three speed transmission. Although the "Olympia" name would reappear on a smaller Kadett based car, this was the last time Opel used the "Olympia" name in connection with an Opel Rekord. It was a sign of rising prosperity and rising equipment levels that the 1966 Rekord based Opel Olympia was the last Opel for which it was necessary to pay extra if you wanted your car fitted with a heater.

== Body ==
The relatively extensive range of body types followed the pattern of the predecessor model. Top seller was the saloon, available with either 2 or 4 doors. There was a "CarAVan" estate, but still only with 3 doors which was normal in Germany, although by then estates of this size produced in France, Italy, England or Sweden almost invariably came with a second set of doors for the passengers in the back. Opel also offered a three-door delivery van which was essentially identical to the estate except that the rear side windows were replaced with metal panels. In addition, a factory built coupé was again offered.

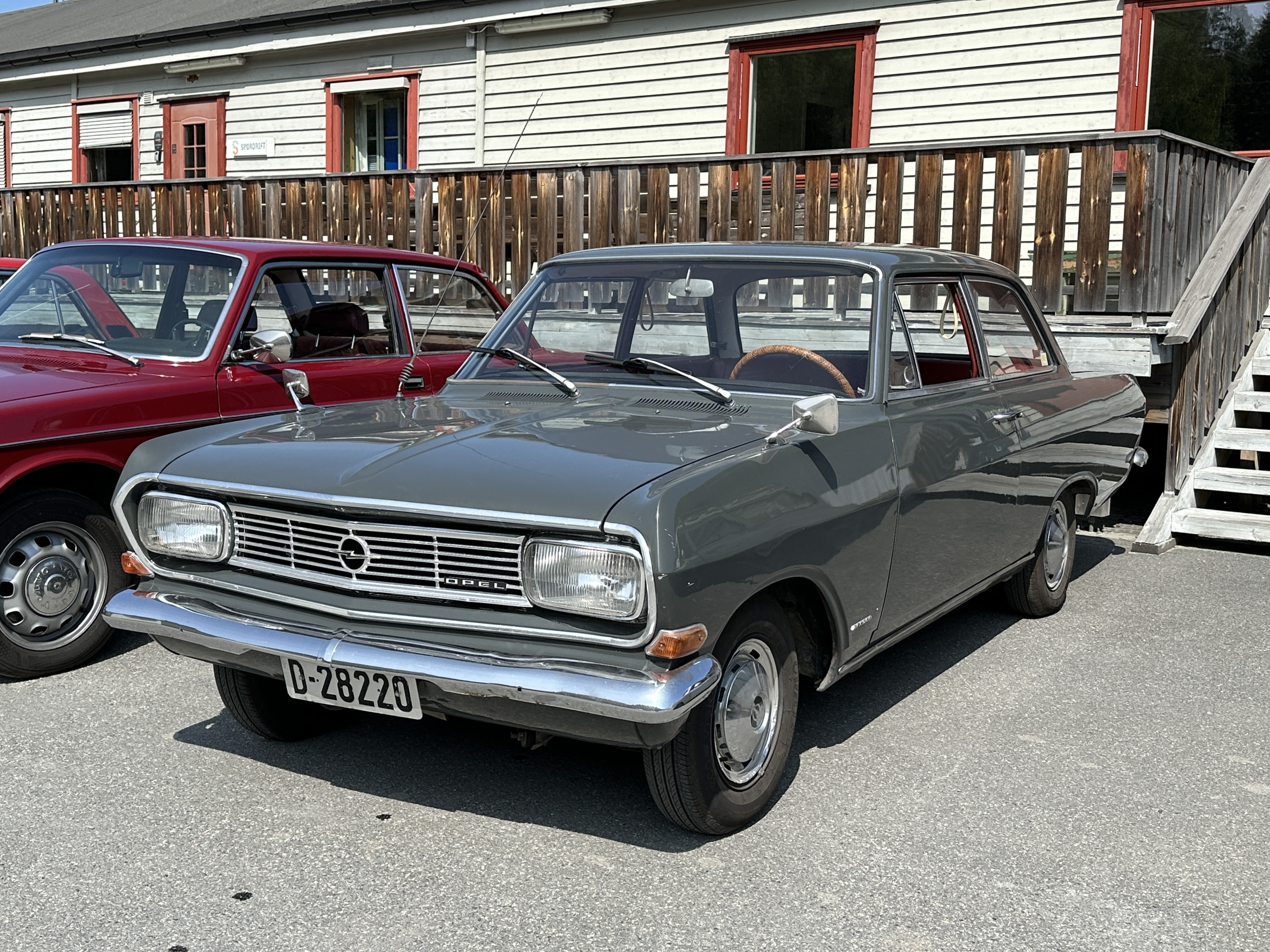
Opel Rekord B 2-door saloon

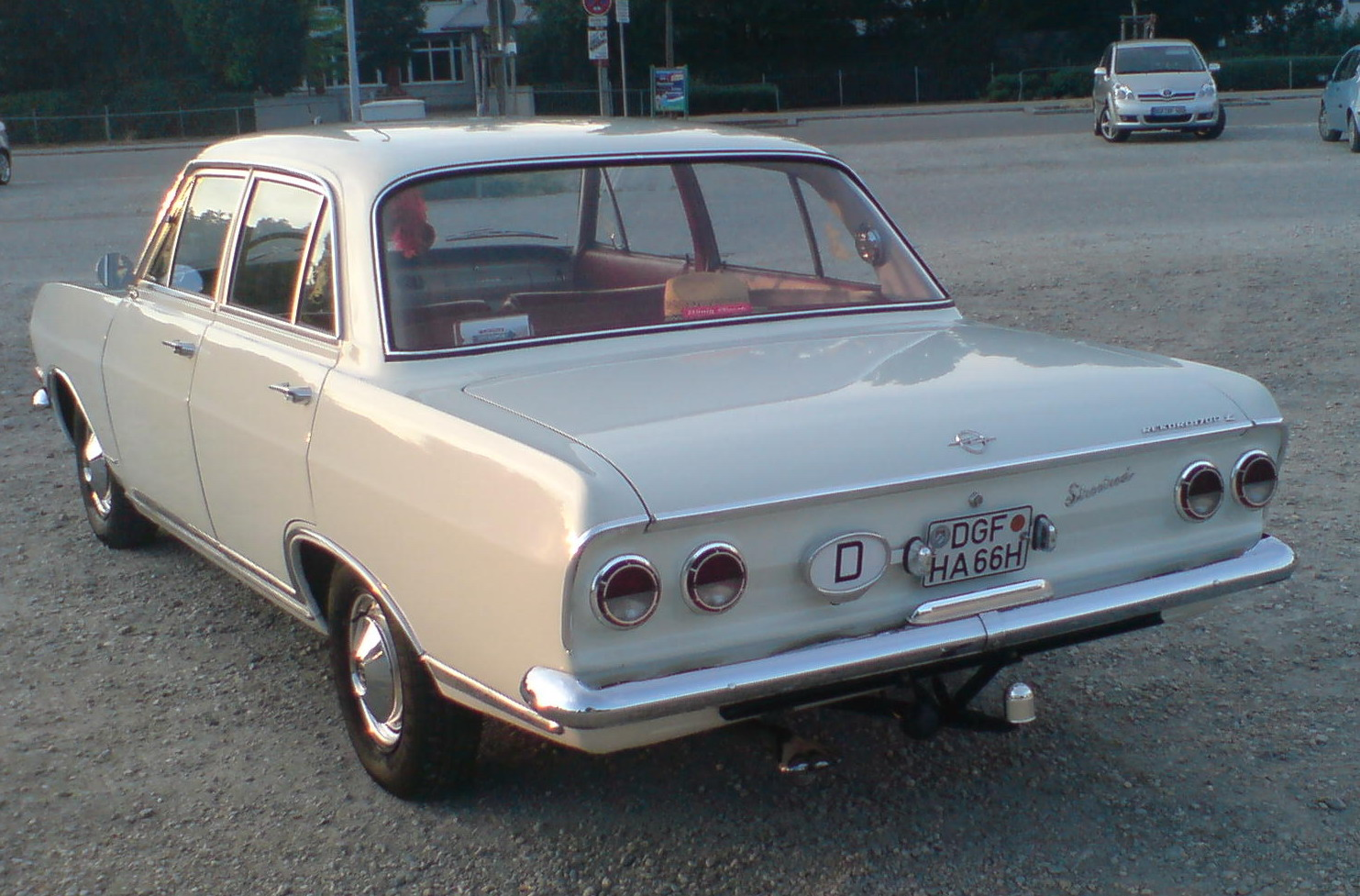
Opel Rekord B 4-door saloon

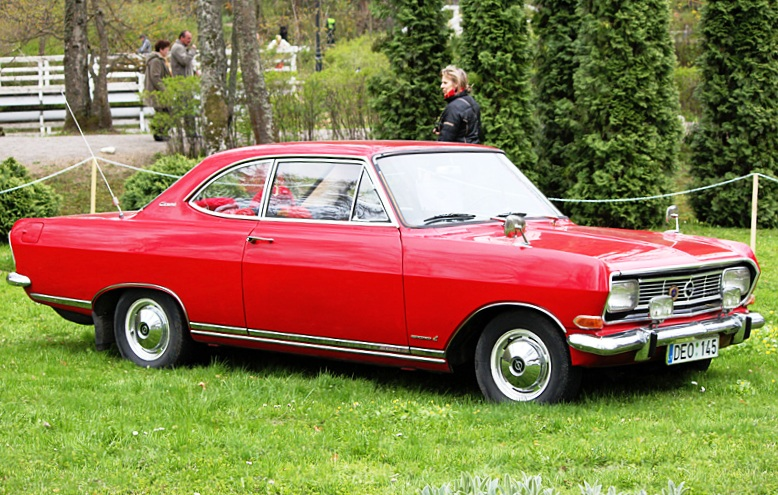
Opel Rekord B Coupé

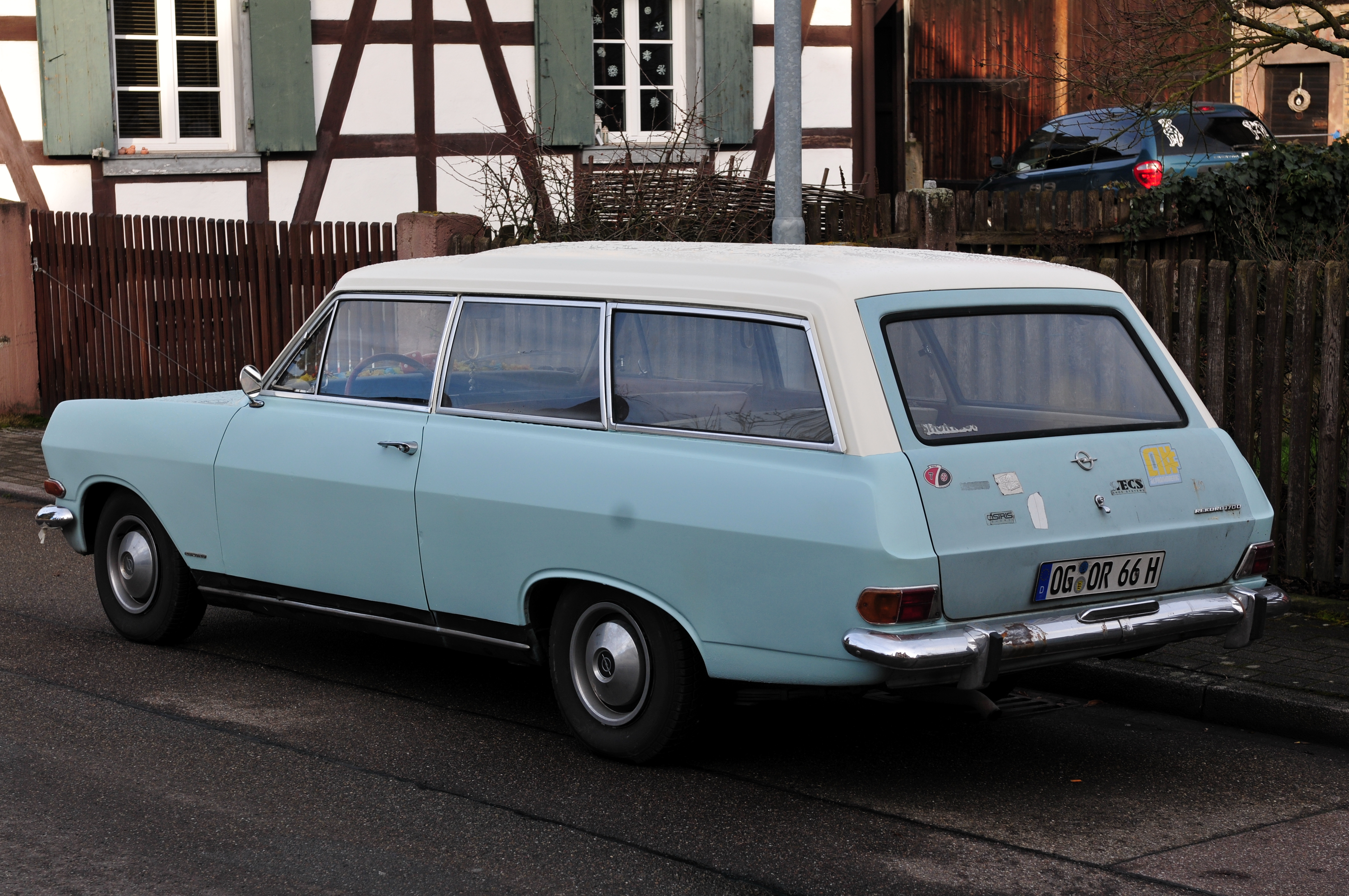
Opel Rekord B Car-A-Van

== Engines ==
=== Four cylinder ===
For the Rekord B the manufacturer introduced a new generation of four cylinder engines to replace the robust but by the then technically outdated engine first seen in the 1937 Opel Olympia. Several manufacturers replaced pre-war side-valve engines with new overhead camshaft engines during this decade, and the new Opel also carried its camshaft directly above the cylinders. This did away with the old rods and rocker linkage that had been a feature of the old engines. However, instead of operating directly on the cylinder valves, the camshaft still operated the valves using rocker arms because the camshaft itself was positioned too low above the cylinders to permit direct action from the camshaft on the valves. One reason for this may have been cosmetic. Other automakers such as BMW with their 1500 launched in 1962 and Volkswagen with their NSU designed K70 (which finally made it to the showrooms in 1970) squeezed vital centimeters off the height of the engine unit by canting it over at an eccentric angle in the engine bay. Opel's so-called Camshaft in Head (CIH) engine configuration similarly enabled a succession of Opels to feature the low bonnet lines that style-conscious product development departments favoured. The camshaft on the new Opel engine was chain driven, which also represented a change from the 1930s design philosophy implicit in the directly cogwheel driven camshaft included in earlier generations of Opel Rekord.

The cam-in-head design four cylinder engine was introduced on the 1900 S version of the Rekord optionally equipped with fully automatic transmission. The engine was available in 1,492 cc (91.0 cu in), 1,698 cc (103.6 cu in), and 1,897 cc (115.8 cu in) displacements. All had the same 69.8 mm stroke length, with the bore varying from 82.5 to 93.0. Claimed power output ranged between 60 hp (44 kW) on the smallest engine and 90 hp (66 kW). The 1492cc engine still accepted "normal" grade petrol, but the larger two engines, with higher compression ratios, both required higher octane fuels. The 1492cc engine still came with a traditional "manual" choke, while the larger engines both came with a "semi-automatic" choke. The "Carter licensed" carburetor that had been fitted to the old four cylinder engines was then replaced by outsourced Solex and Zenith carburetors.

The new four-cylinder engine range self-evidently had plenty of scope for further development, and continued to power Opel Rekords until the model's 1986 demise.

=== Six cylinder ===
Unlike the four cylinder Rekord B, there was nothing new about the engine fitted in the six cylinder top-end model. This was the 2605cc unit already seen in the Rekord-A L6, and which with these dimensions had first appeared in the 1959 Opel Kapitän. However, the basic design of this unit went back to the 1937 Opel Super Six. The 1959 upgrade had left this unit with a claimed 100 hp (74 kW) of horsepower which should have provided a useful performance boost over the fastest of the new four cylinder powered Rekords. The six cylinder Rekord B was indeed the fastest in the range, but only by a small margin: much of the extra power was needed to cope with the extra weight of the engine which also, as with the Rekord A, made the steering very heavy in urban traffic. As before, the manufacturer reserved power assisted steering for their luxury models, the Opels Admiral, Kapitän and Diplomat.

== Transmission ==
The standard transmission package for the saloon and estate-bodied Rekord Bs featured a manual all-synchromesh gearbox, controlled by a column mounted lever. Customers could choose between three or four forward speeds.

Coupé buyers found the four speed manual transmission, but controlled using a centrally positioned floor mounted gear lever, included in the price.

The big news on transmission was the option, for the first time on a Rekord, of fully automatic transmission. This was restricted to buyers of cars fitted with the largest four cylinder engine, known as the "1900S". The transmission fitted was a General Motors Powerglide system, well known in North America for more than a decade. The system was simple and durable, but had been designed for use with the larger engines and there were only two forward speeds. Using it in a four-cylinder Opel gave rise to a noticeable performance deficit.

As before, the option of an "Olymat" automatic clutch provided by Fichel & Sachs was offered to buyers specifying the three speed transmission. The system was similar to the Fichel & Sachs "Saxomat" automatic clutch available at this time from several German automakers.

== Brakes ==
All Rekord B's came with disc brakes at the front and drum brakes at the back, controlled using a dual circuit system and brake booster. This was a progression from the situation with the Rekord A, in respect of which only had servo assist on the front (disc) brakes, not at the rear drums. Disc brakes on Rekord A was standard on the coupé and 4-door De Luxe, and optional on the sedan during 1965.

== Technical data ==
Opel Rekord B (1965–1966)
	1500	1700 S	1900 S	L-6
Engine:	Four-stroke straight-four engine			Four-stroke straight-six engine
Bore × Stroke:	82.5 mm × 69.8 mm (3.2 in × 2.7 in)	88.0 mm × 69.8 mm (3.5 in × 2.7 in)	93.0 mm × 69.8 mm (3.7 in × 2.7 in)	85 mm × 76.5 mm (3.3 in × 3.0 in)
Displacement:	1,492 cc (91.0 cu in)	1,698 cc (103.6 cu in)	1,897 cc (115.8 cu in)	2,605 cc (159.0 cu in)
Maximum power:	60 PS (44 kW) at 4800 rpm	75 PS (55 kW) at 5200 rpm	90 PS (66 kW) at 5100 rpm	100 PS (74 kW) at 4600 rpm
Maximum torque:	103 N⋅m (76 lb⋅ft) at 2800–3600 rpm	127 N⋅m (94 lb⋅ft) at 2500–2900 rpm	146 N⋅m (108 lb⋅ft) at 2500–3100 rpm	181 N⋅m (133 lb⋅ft) at 2400 rpm
Compression ratio:	8.2:1	8.8:1	9.0:1	8.2:1
Fuel feed:	Single downdraft carburetor		Single twin-choke downdraft carburetor	Single downdraft carburetor
Valvetrain:	Chain driven single camshaft in head (CIH), two overhead valves per cylinder, short pushrods and stamped-steel rocker arms			
Cooling:	Water-cooled			
Transmission:	3- or 4-speed manual, column or floor-mounted shift		3- or 4-speed manual, column or floor-mounted shift GM Powerglide 2-speed automatic (optional)	4-speed manual, column or floor-mounted shift
Front suspension:	Double wishbone suspension with balljoints, coil springs and hydraulic dampers			
Rear suspension:	Live axle with semi-elliptical leaf springs and hydraulic dampers — CarAVan has an extra leaf			
Brakes:	Hydraulically activated disc brakes in front (238 mm mm Ø), drum brakes at rear (230 mm mm Ø)			
Body and chassis:	Steel unibody chassis with steel body			
Track front/rear:	1,321 / 1,276 mm (52.0 / 50.2 in)			1,325 / 1,279 mm (52.2 / 50.4 in)
Wheelbase:	2,639 mm (103.9 in)			
Length:	4,529–4,551 mm (178.3–179.2 in)			
Unladen weight:	990–1,135 kg (2,183–2,502 lb)			
Top speed:	133 km/h (83 mph)	146–150 km/h (91–93 mph)	154–162 km/h (96–101 mph)	163–168 km/h (101–104 mph)
0–100 km/h:	22–24 s	17–24.5 s	13.5–17 s	13–14 s
Fuel consumption:	11.0 l/100 km 25.7 mpg_{‑imp}; 21.4 mpg_{‑US} Regular octane	12.0–12.5 l/100 km 23.5–22.6 mpg_{‑imp}; 19.6–18.8 mpg_{‑US} (High octane)	12.0–13.0 l/100 km 23.5–21.7 mpg_{‑imp}; 19.6–18.1 mpg_{‑US} (High octane)	12.0 l/100 km 23.5 mpg_{‑imp}; 19.6 mpg_{‑US} (High octane)

== See also ==
- Opel Rekord
- Opel Commodore

== Sources ==
Werner Oswald: Deutsche Autos 1945–1975. Motorbuch Verlag, Stuttgart 1975, ISBN 3-87943-391-7, pp. 88–93.
