= 1st German Antique Police Car Museum =

Museum of historic German police vehicles

Coordinates: 50.7963°N 08.7265°E

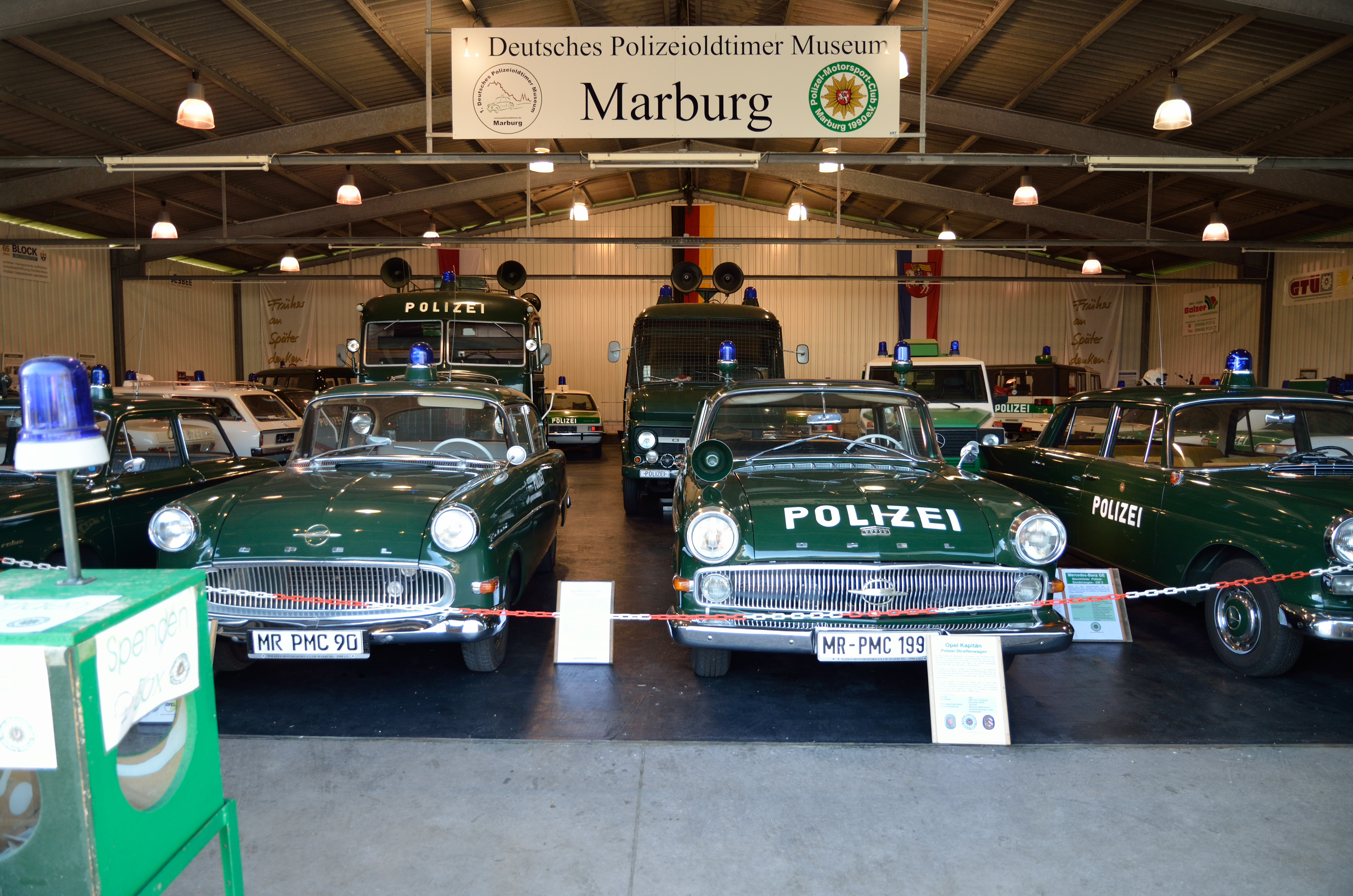
Hall I of the museum

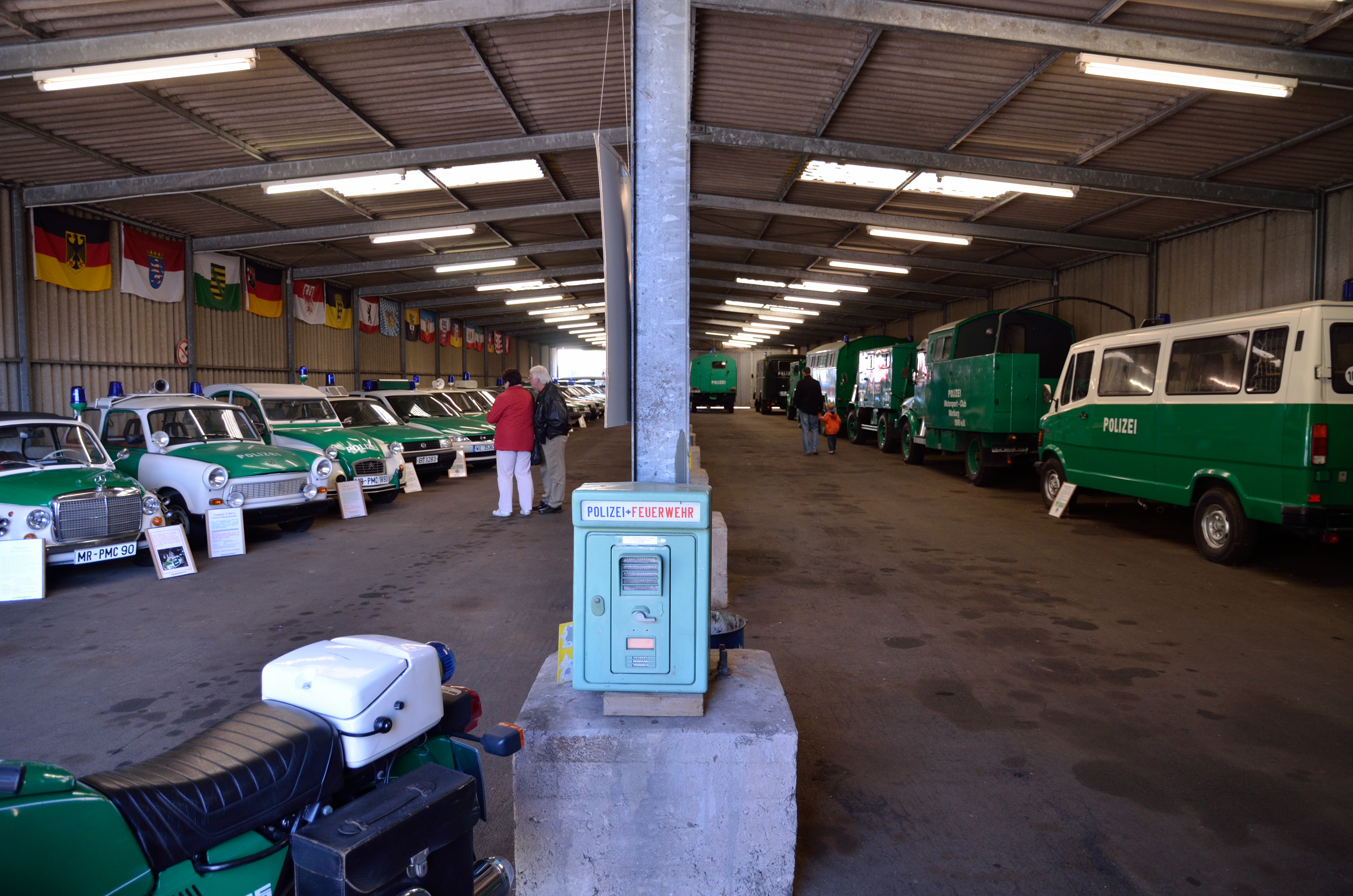
Hall II of the museum

The 1st German Antique Police Car Museum (German - 1. Deutsche Polizeioldtimer-Museum) is a museum of historic German police vehicles in the Wehrshausen district of the German city of Marburg.

== History ==
It was established on 24 June 2000 as part of the tenth anniversary celebrations by the Polizei-Motorsport-Club Marburg 1990 e. V.., with the Hessian Interior Minister Volker Bouffier as its patron. Collecting historic vehicles was originally a side-aspect of the Club - it made its first acquisition in 1991, a 1950s Opel Rekord P1. The museum building was officially opened on 12 July 2003 and since then it has been open from April to October, usually on Sundays.
