= Opel Rekord P2 =

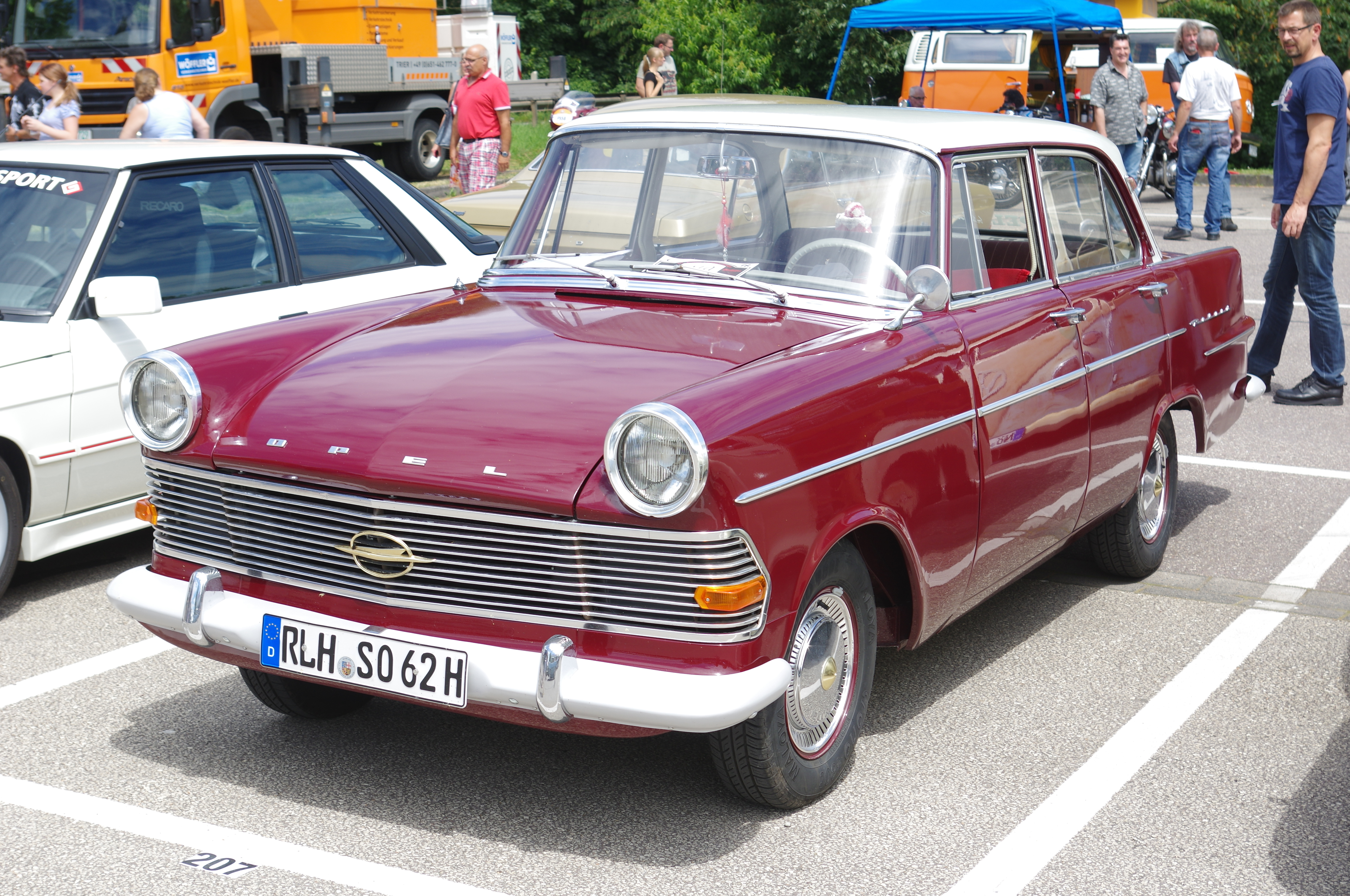

Overview
- Manufacturer: Opel (General Motors)
- Production: August 1960 – March 1963
- Assembly: Germany: Rüsselsheim; South Africa: Port Elizabeth (GMSA)

Body and chassis
- Class: Large family car (D)
- Body style: 2/4-door saloon 3-door estate 3-door van 2-door coupé 2-door pickup (South Africa only)

Powertrain
- Engine: 1,488 cc I4; 1,680 cc I4
- Transmission: 3-speed manual 4-speed manual (optional)

Chronology
- Predecessor: Opel Rekord P1
- Successor: Opel Rekord Series A

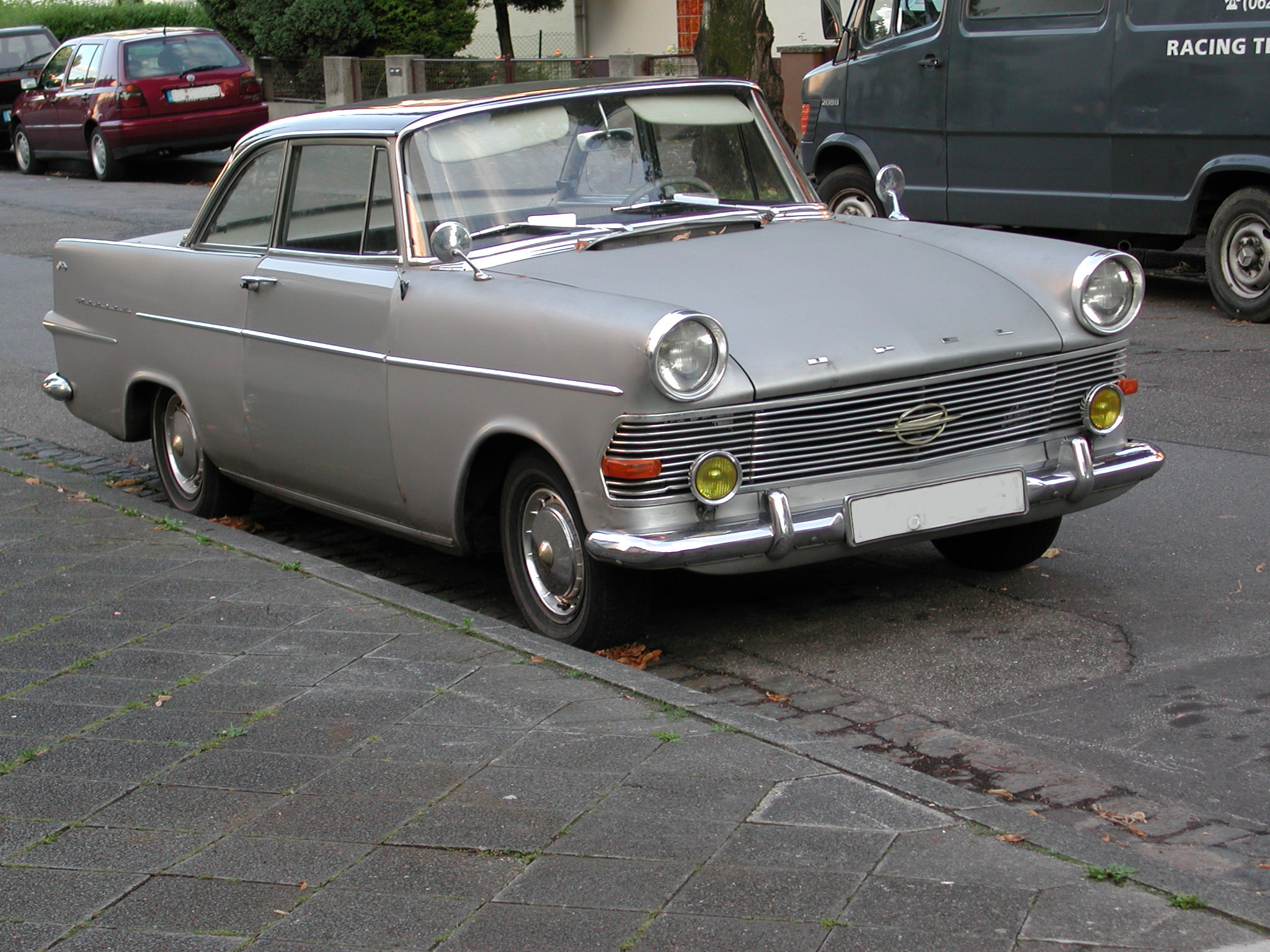
Opel Rekord P2 coupé.

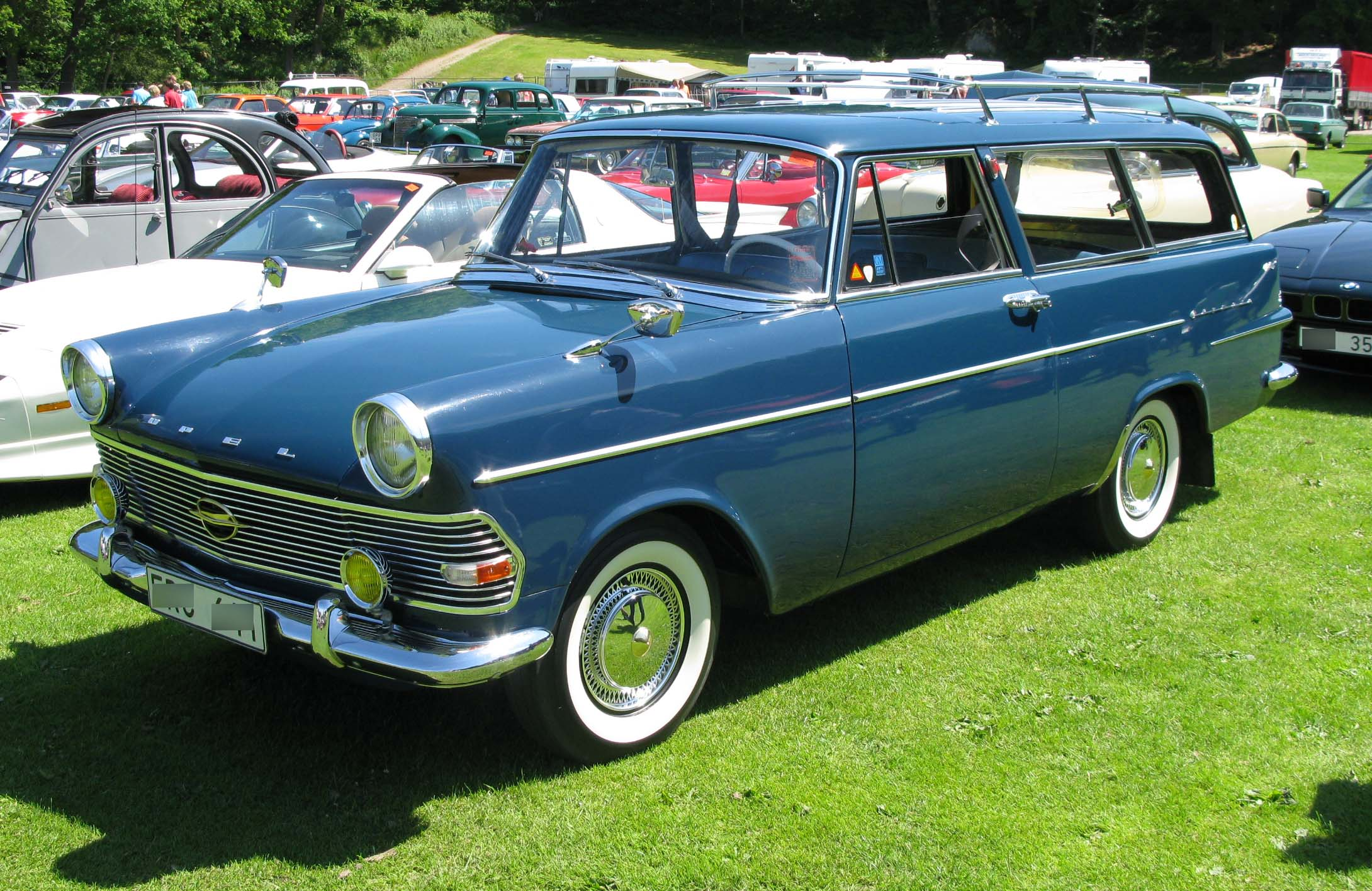
Opel Rekord P2 Caravan.

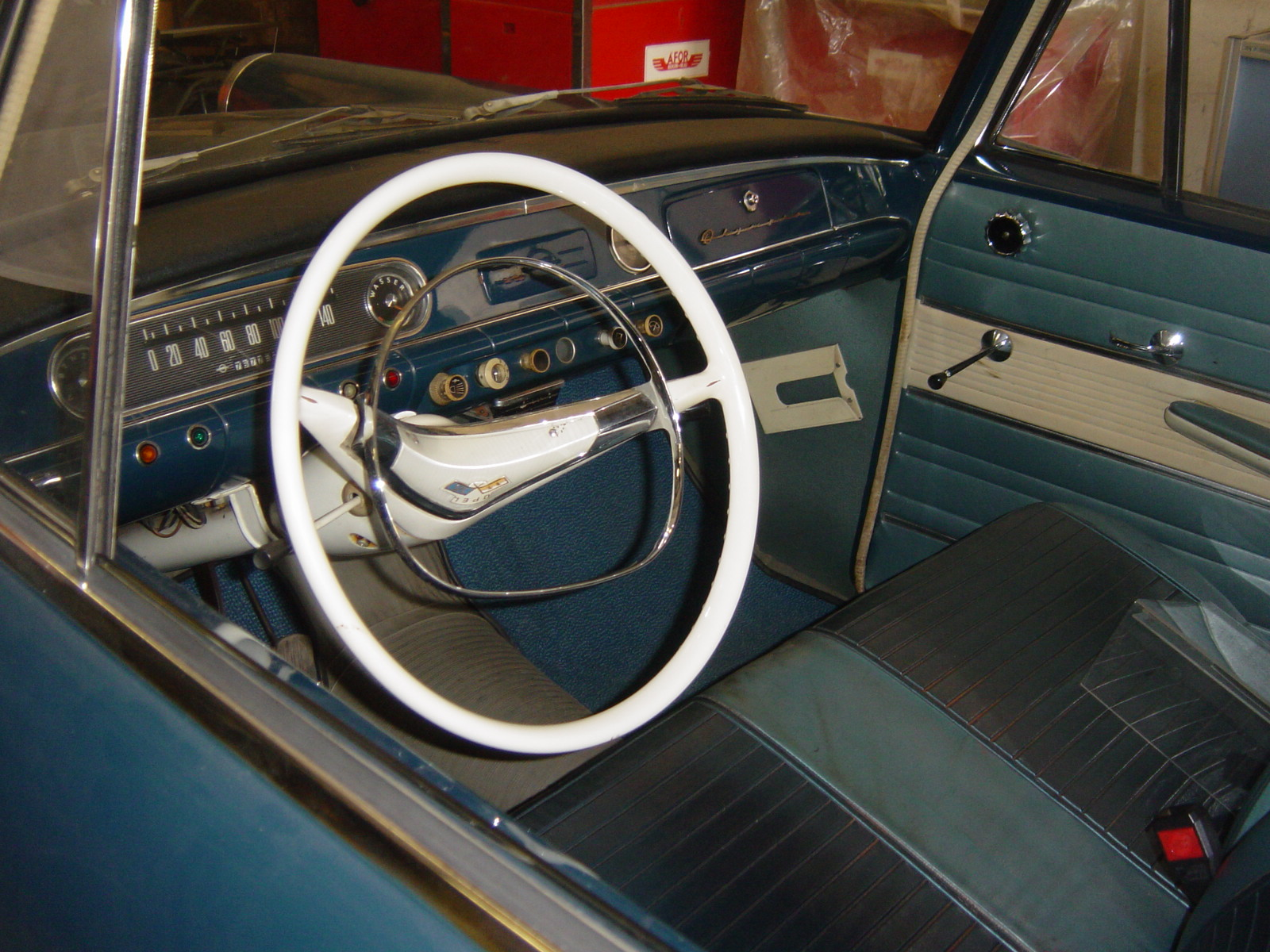
Opel Rekord P2 interior

The Opel Rekord P2 is a large family car that was introduced in the summer of 1960, by Opel as a replacement for the Opel Rekord P1. It shared its 2,541 mm wheelbase with its predecessor, but was nonetheless a little longer and wider. The wrap-around windscreen which had been a defining element of the Rekord P1, and which had given rise to the P for "Panorama" designation, was now gone, but the P designation remained and the driver's view out, assisted by relatively thin A-pillars, remained good.

A departure with the P2 was a volume produced coupé version. A coupé version of the P1 had been offered but this was a conversion by a specialist body builder which made it hugely expensive and it found few buyers. Opel were able to price the factory produced P2 coupé far more competitively and it sold well. However, the big seller in the Rekord range was, as before, the saloon version, available with two or four doors. The Rekord P2 consistently achieved second place in the West German sales charts, beaten to the top slot only by the smaller and cheaper Volkswagen Beetle. Despite selling at a rate marginally ahead of that achieved by its successful predecessor, the Rekord P2 was replaced in February 1963, after only 30 months, by the Rekord Series A.

== The car ==
The style of the Rekord P2 followed the fashion trends of the time, being less ornate than its predecessor, and in consequence being perceived as "less American looking". The front grille was wider and the tail fins almost completely disappeared, although the embellishment of body creases around the rear lights was curiously elaborate. The panoramic screen was gone which made it possible for the front doors to be wider, facilitating easier entry for the driver and passengers.

As on the previous model, customers could specify two-tone colour schemes both for the exterior paint work and for the interior trim.

In technical terms the car in most respects followed its predecessor, though some attempt was made to improve secondary safety through attention to the detailing of the interior.

The glove box lid still carried the name "Olympia", a reference to the fact that the predecessor model had been badged as the Opel Olympia Rekord until 1959, and a tribute to the original 1937 Opel Olympia which had been a defining model for the manufacturer, both because of its (then) innovative monocoque construction and because of the quantities in which the company tooled up to produce it.

== Body configurations ==
By the standards of European automakers at this time, the range of body types was extensive. Top seller was the saloon, available with either two or four doors. There was also a three-door "Caravan" estate and a three-door delivery van which was essentially identical to the estate except that the rear side windows were replaced with metal panels.

Coupé and cabriolet versions were offered. These were initially conversions by the Darmstadt body builders Autenrieth which made them very expensive. However, in August 1961 Opel started to build Opel Rekord P2 coupés in volume along with the saloons and estates on the Rüsselsheim assembly lines, and from this time the price of the coupé was much reduced. There was still a price to be paid by passengers in the back seat in terms of the drastically reduced rear head-room provided by this body type, but the P2 coupé nevertheless sold well. The company never attempted to provide Rekord P2 cabriolets directly from the production line. These continued to be offered by the bodybuilders Autenrieth. However, the convertible conversion was priced at DM 11,635 at a time when entry level Rekord P2s came with a manufacturer's recommended retail price of DM 6,545. It remained very rare: in 2005 it was thought that eight of the twenty built survived.

The Rekord P2 was also assembled by General Motors S.A. in South Africa, in right-hand drive form. Cars of German origin sold well there as many Afrikaners resisted buying British after the atrocities of the Boer War.

== Engines ==
Unlike the modern bodywork, the 1,488 cc ohv four-cylinder water-cooled engine was very little changed since it had first been offered in the Opel Olympia back in 1937. The claimed power for this engine had been increased in 1959, while it still powered the previous Rekord, to 50 PS (37 kW) at 3,900 rpm, and this remained the power unit for the entry level Rekord P2 throughout its production run.

The 1,680 cc engine offering 55 PS (40 kW) at 4000 rpm, which had also first been seen in the predecessor model in 1959, was also available from the outset in the Rekord P2. For those specifying the more comfortable "L" version of the car, from June 1962 the company also offered a 60 PS (44 kW) "S" engine supported by a compression ratio increased from 7.25:1 to 8.0:1, a carburetor diameter increased from 30 mm to 36 mm and, for the first time in a Rekord, the requirement for customers to use premium grade (increased octane) fuel.

== Transmission and running gear ==
The Rekord P2 took its three-speed all-synchromesh transmission from its predecessor, along with the column mounted gear lever through which it was controlled. However, the P2 was also the first Rekord on which, as an option, buyers could specify a four-speed all-synchromesh transmission, still controlled using a column mounted gear lever.

The P2 was offered with an "Olymat" automatic clutch provided by Fichtel & Sachs. The system was broadly similar to the Fichtel & Sachs "Saxomat" automatic clutch beginning to be offered at this time by other German automakers.

Other principal mechanical elements on the P2 such as the suspension and steering systems were also lifted largely unchanged from the Rekord P1.

== Commercial ==
At launch the entry level 1,488 cc two-door record came with a manufacturer's recommended price of DM 6,545.

The Rekord P2 was produced at an annual rate slightly ahead of its predecessor. It was a commercial success. However, this was in the context of a growing economy and a growing auto-market in West Germany and in several key export markets. During the thirty-month period between summer 1960 and February 1963, Opel recorded production of 787,684 Opel Rekord P2s. For much of this time it was West Germany’s second best seller, beaten to the top slot only by the smaller cheaper and seemingly unstoppable Volkswagen Beetle. However, 1960 also saw the launch of a new Ford Taunus 17M. The "Badewanne" Taunus, so called because commentators claimed that it resembled a bath-tub, and the Opel Rekord P2 were closely matched in terms of size, specification and price. Several times in 1961 and again in 1962 the monthly sales statistics showed the Rekord pushed into third place by the Taunus 17M. This was the only time that the Rekord's domination of the West German family car market would be challenged in this way, but the overall Taunus sales of 669,731 during the four years from 1960 to 1964 still indicate that the Rekord was outselling the Taunus more often than not during the early 1960s.

Technical Data Opel Rekord P2 (1960–1963)
	1500 (1960–1963)	1700 (1960–1963)	1700 S (1962–1963)
Engine:	Four-stroke straight-four engine		
Bore × stroke:	80 mm × 74 mm (3.1 in × 2.9 in)	85 mm × 74 mm (3.3 in × 2.9 in)	
Displacement:	1,488 cc (90.8 cu in)	1,680 cc (102.5 cu in)	
Maximum power:	50 PS (37 kW) at 4000 rpm	55 PS (40 kW) at 4000 rpm	60 PS (44 kW) at 4100 rpm
Maximum torque:	106 N⋅m (78 lb⋅ft) at 2100 rpm	120 N⋅m (89 lb⋅ft) at 2100 rpm	125 N⋅m (92 lb⋅ft) at 1700–2000 rpm
Compression ratio:	7.25:1		8.0:1
Fuel feed:	Opel downdraft carburetor (licensed from Carter) with 30 mm (1.2 in) Ø (1700S 36 mm (1.4 in) Ø)		
Valvetrain:	Two overhead valves per cylinder, cam-in-block, pushrods and rocker arms		
Cooling:	Water-cooled		
Transmission:	3–speed manual with column shift (4–speed manual with column shift optional)		
Front suspension:	Double wishbone suspension with balljoints, coil springs and hydraulic dampers		
Rear suspension:	Live axle with semi-elliptical leaf springs and hydraulic dampers — CarAVan has an extra leaf		
Brakes:	Hydraulically activated drum brakes, Ø 200 mm (Caravan rear Ø 230 mm)		
Body and chassis:	Steel unibody chassis with steel body		
Track front/rear:	1,265 / 1,280 mm (49.8 / 50.4 in)		
Wheelbase:	2,541 mm (100.0 in)		
Length:	4,515 mm (177.8 in)		
Unladen weight:	910–975 kg (2,006.2–2,149.5 lb) (Caravan: 1,000–1,015 kg (2,204.6–2,237.7 lb))		
Top speed:	125–128 km/h (77.7–79.5 mph)	130–132 km/h (80.8–82.0 mph)	135–140 km/h (83.9–87.0 mph)
0–100 km/h:	24–27 s	20–22 s	20 s
Fuel consumption:	9.5–10.5 l/100 km 29.7–26.9 mpg_{‑imp}; 24.8–22.4 mpg_{‑US}		9.5 l/100 km 29.7 mpg_{‑imp}; 24.8 mpg_{‑US}

== See also ==
- Opel Rekord
