= Opel Rekord P1 =

Opel Olympia Rekord (1957–1959) Opel Rekord (1959–1960) Opel Rekord P1 (in retrospect)
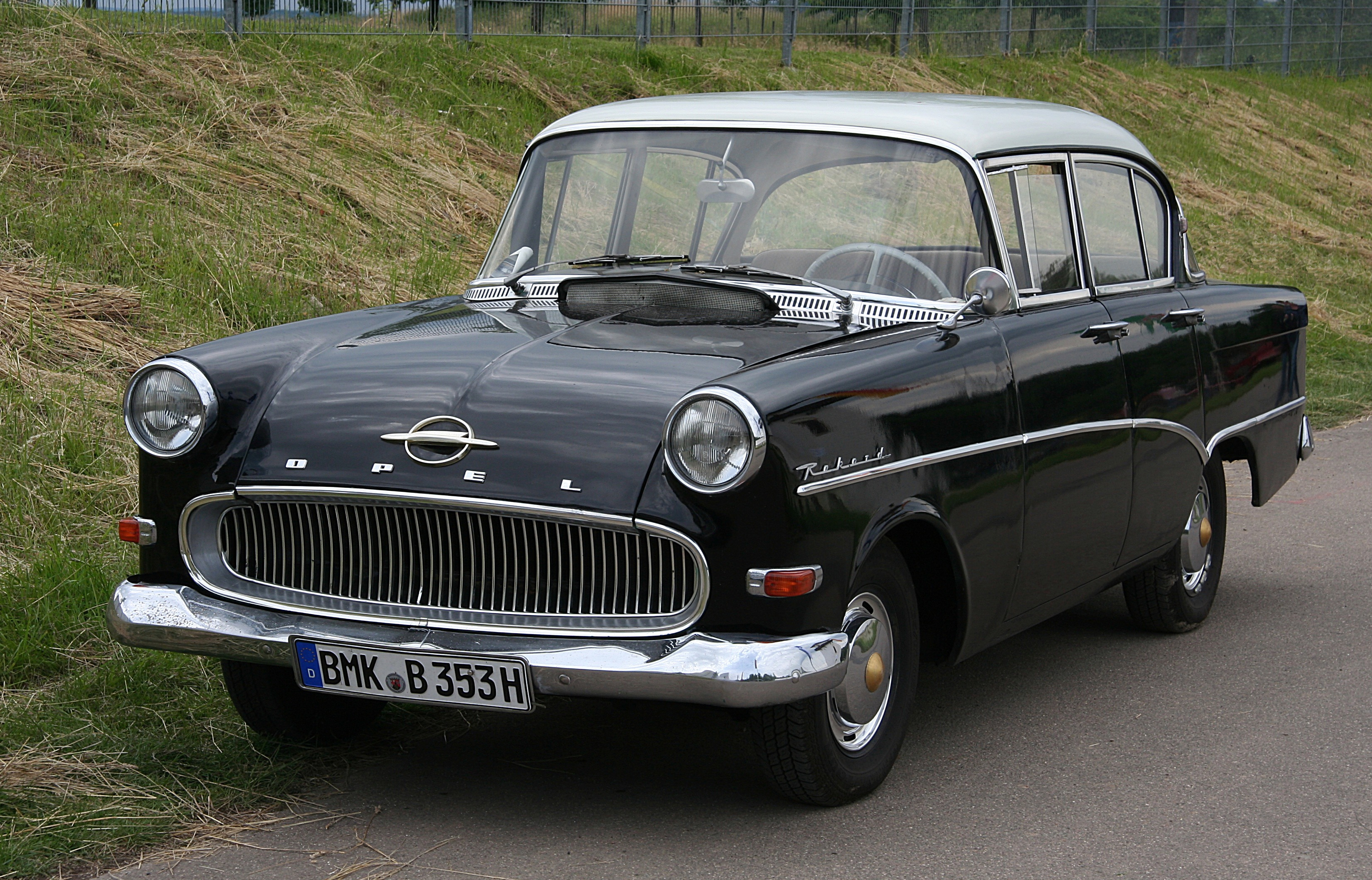

Overview
- Manufacturer: Opel (General Motors)
- Production: August 1957 – July 1960 (until 1962 for Opel 1200)
- Assembly: Germany: Rüsselsheim; South Africa: Port Elizabeth (GMSA)

Body and chassis
- Class: Large family car (D)
- Body style: 2/4-door saloon 3-door estate 3-door van 2-door pickup (South Africa)

Powertrain
- Engine: 1,205 cc I4 (Opel 1200); 1,488 cc I4; 1,680 cc I4
- Transmission: 3-speed manual

Chronology
- Predecessor: Opel Olympia Rekord
- Successor: Opel Rekord P2

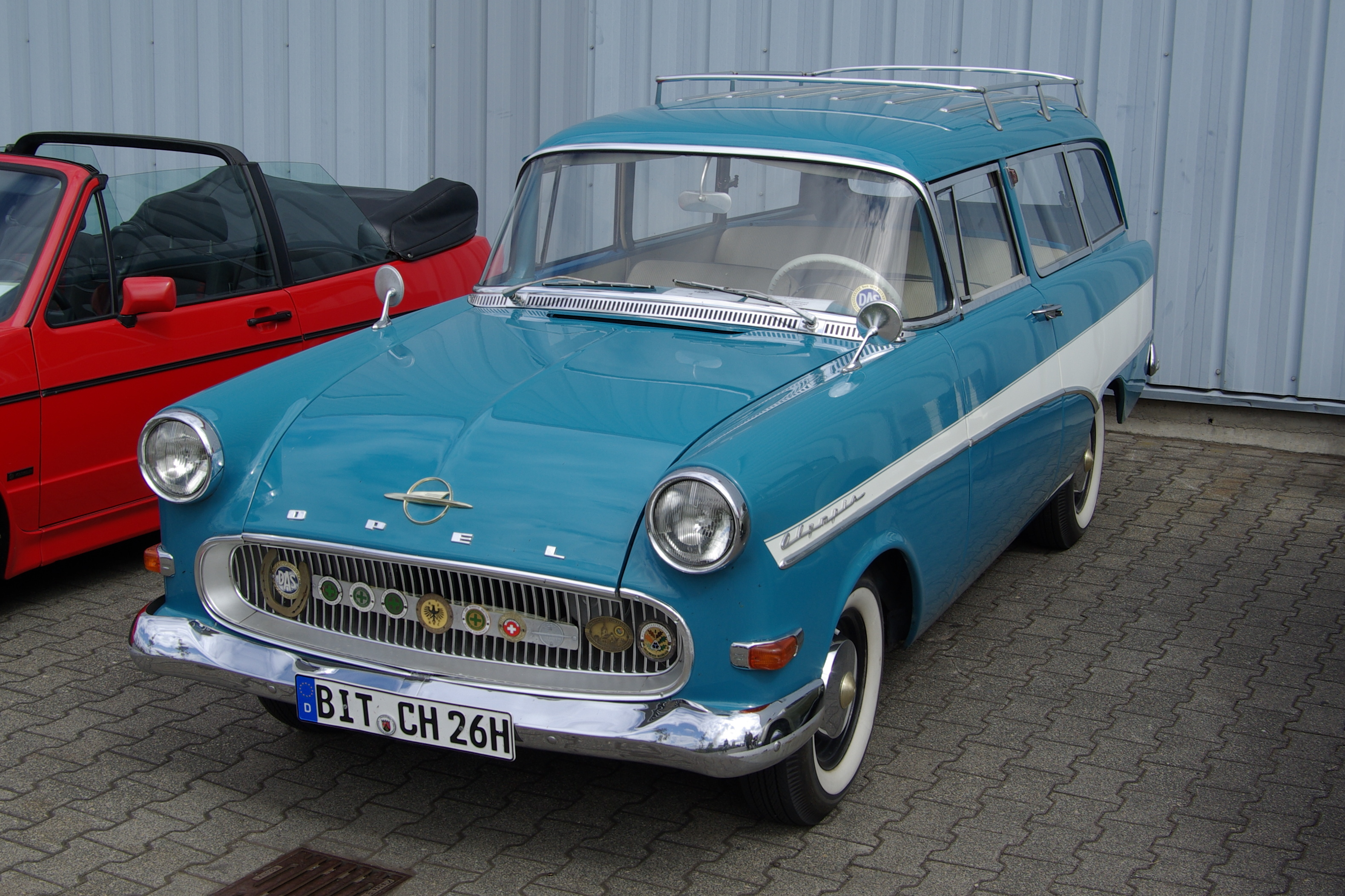
The estate version was branded as the Opel Rekord Caravan.

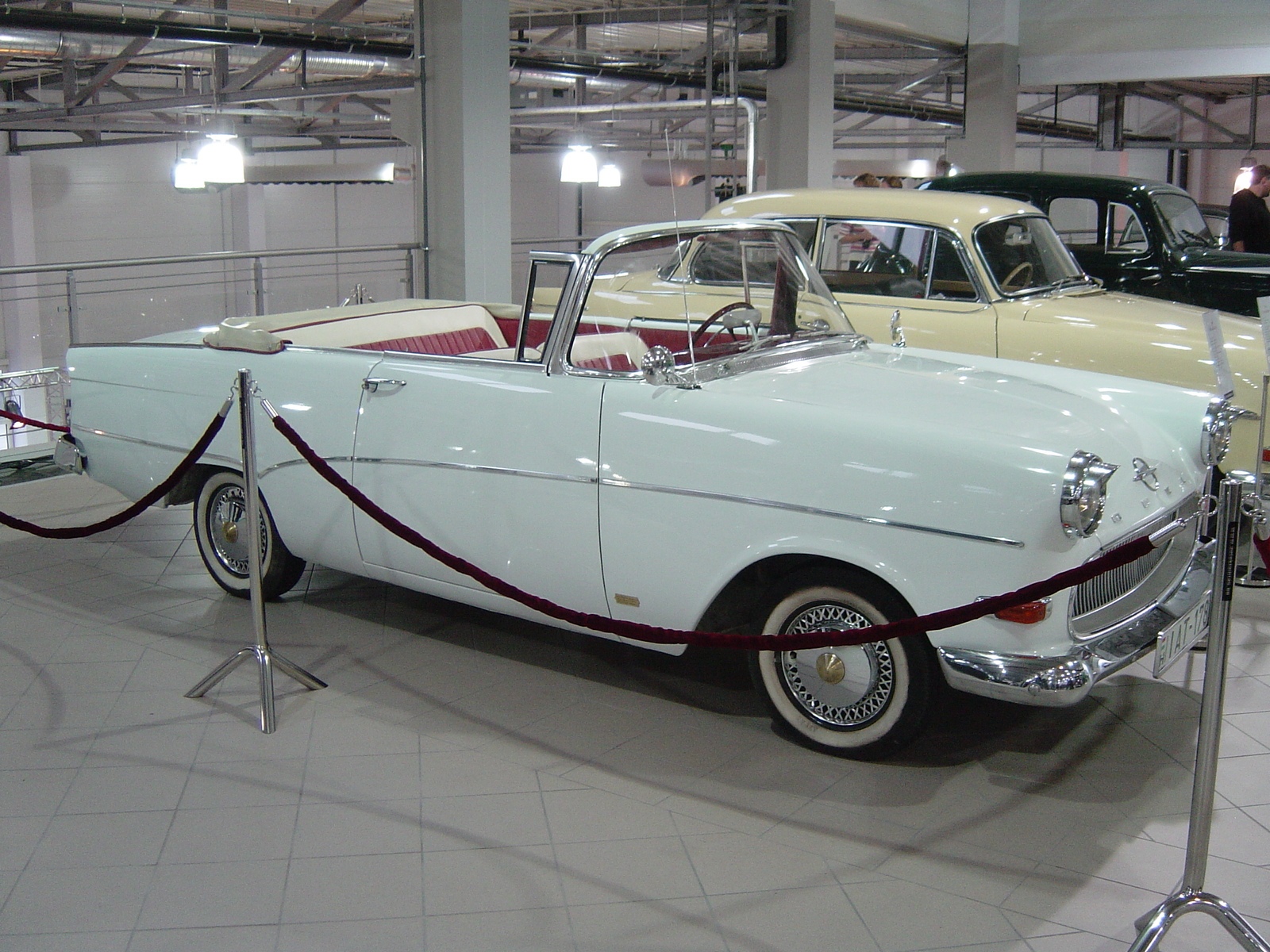
The Opel Rekord P1 cabriolet and coupé conversions were always extremely rare.

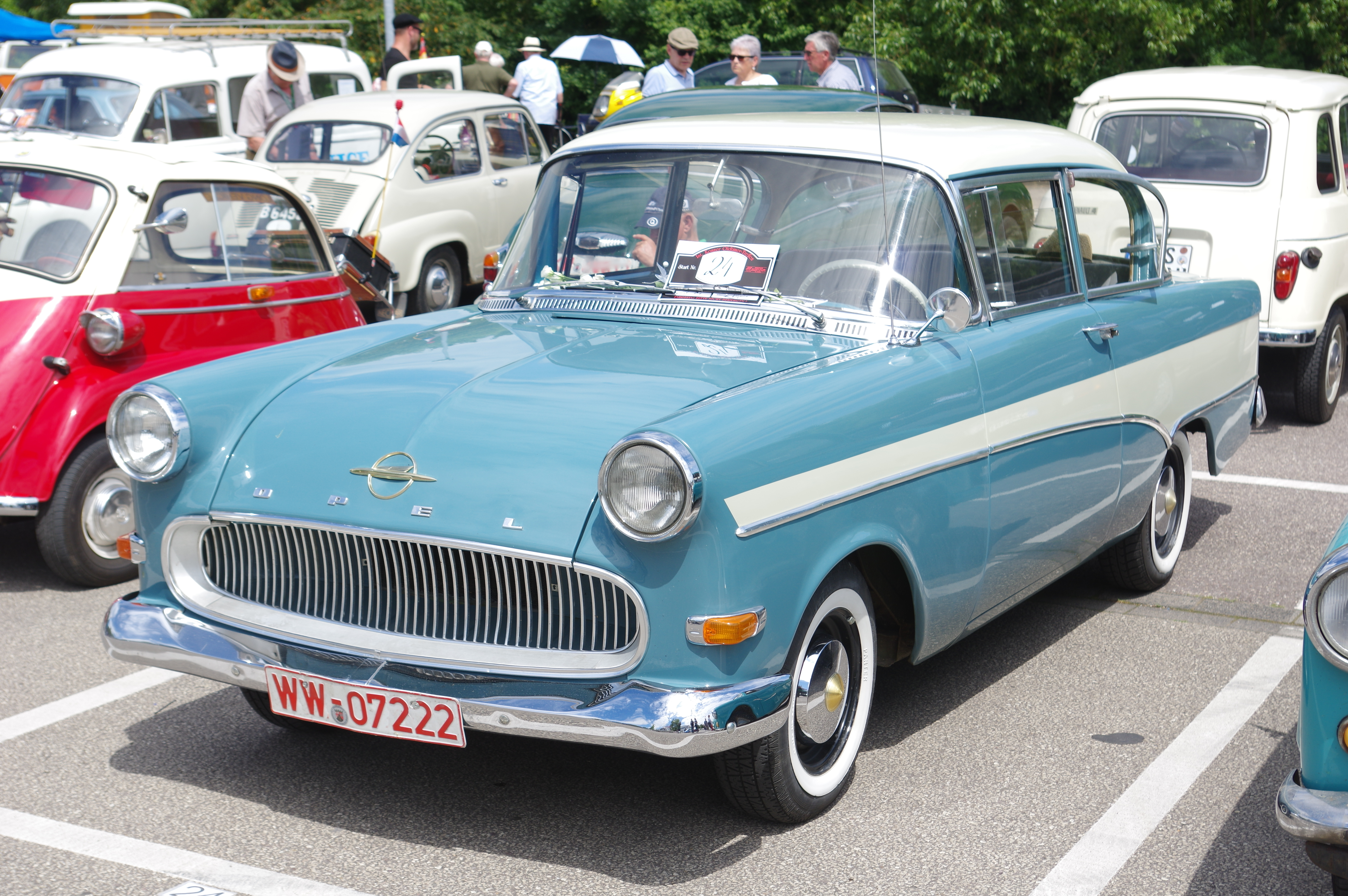
Although the Rekord was now available with four doors, the two-door sedan continued to be a strong seller.

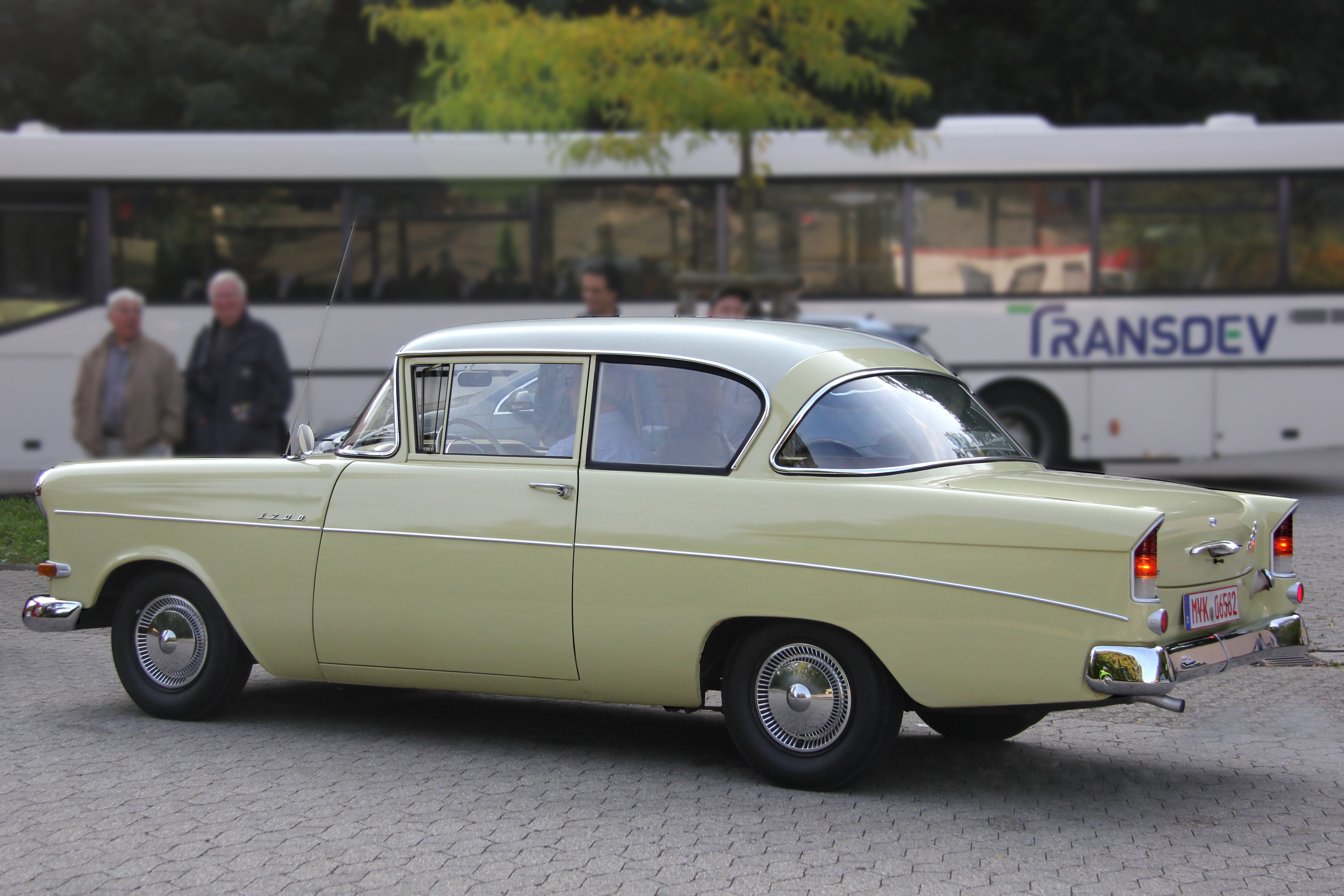
The stripped down Opel 1200 appeared at the end of 1959 and was offered until 1962, two years after the Rekord on which it was based had been replaced.

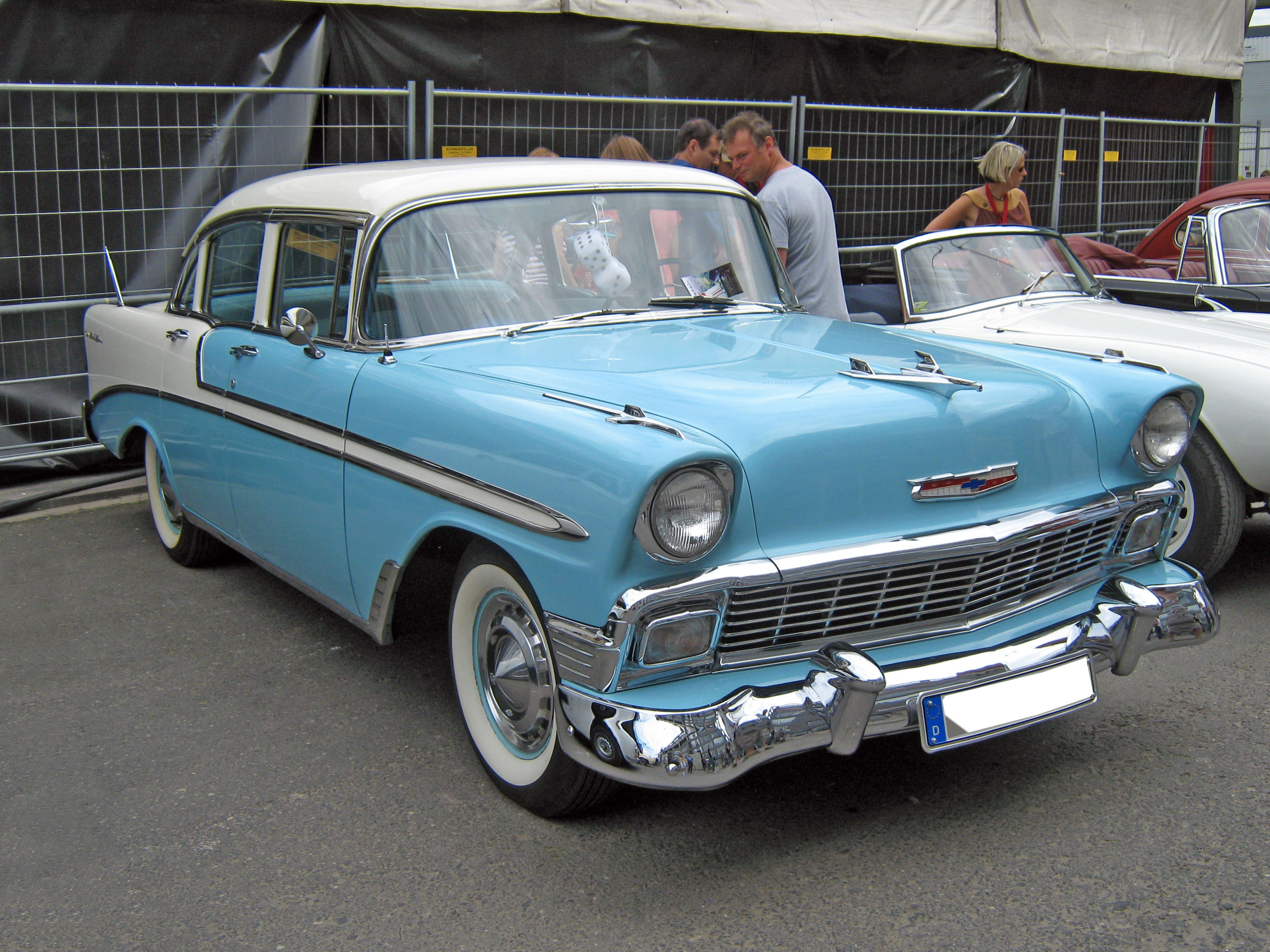
Chief designer Hans Mersheimer was thought to have taken particular inspiration for the Rekord P1 from the 1956 Chevrolet Bel Air.

The Opel Rekord P1 (branded for its first two years as the Opel Olympia Rekord P) was a large family car introduced in August 1957, in time for the Frankfurt Motor Show, by Opel as a replacement for the previous year's Opel Olympia Rekord. It was larger than its predecessor and featured an eye-catching US-style wrap-around windscreen and rear window, reminiscent of its General Motors Luton-built cousin, the Vauxhall Victor F, which had appeared in England a few months earlier.

The Opel Rekord P1 sold very well, consistently achieving second place in the West German sales charts, beaten to the top slot only by the smaller and cheaper Volkswagen Beetle. The manufacturer departed from the habit established with the predecessor model of facelifting the front grille and other trim details every year, but the P1 nevertheless experienced a relatively short production run. The P1 was replaced in mid-1960 by the Opel Rekord P2, although the body of the Rekord P1 continued to be offered on the Opel 1200, itself a reduced specification version of the Rekord P1, until 1962.

Unlike the modern bodywork, the 1,488 cc OHV four-cylinder water-cooled engine was very little changed since it had first been offered in the Opel Olympia back in 1937. Claimed power output at launch was unchanged from the previous model's 45 PS (33 kW) at 3900 rpm. However, from July 1959 the compression ratio was increased, so that the 1,488 cc engine offered a claimed 50 PS (37 kW) of maximum power. Customers could also specify a larger 1,680 cc engine for which the published maximum power output was 55 PS (40 kW) at 4,000 rpm.

== Public launch ==
On 13 August 1957 the Opel Chairman Edward W. Zdunek presented the Opel Olympia Rekord P in the local town hall at Rüsselsheim. The "P" in the name stood for "Panorama", a reference to the view out of the wrap-around windscreen. However, in 1960 the successor model appeared, branded as the Opel Rekord P2, and at this point the car launched in 1957 became known retrospectively as the Opel Rekord P1. At a time when mid-range incomes were expanding fast on the back of West Germany's so called post-war "Wirtschaftswunder" (economic miracle) the Olympia Rekord targeted the family car market, which was also a strength of the mother company in the United States.

== Showroom appeal ==
The panoramic front and rear windows were believed to be copied from recent North American designs such as the latest Special and Roadmaster. Quickly the car was dubbed in the motoring press as the „Bauern-Buick“ (Peasant's Buick), although chief designer Hans Mersheimer was thought to have taken particular inspiration from the 1955 version of the Chevrolet Bel Air. Other unusual features redolent of the new optimism of the age were the two tone paint-work, complemented by two tone interior trim.

== Name changes ==
The 1957–60 Opel (Olympia) Rekord P1 came with different names, depending on date and type. At the 1957 launch it was called the "Opel Olympia Rekord", or, sometimes, the "Opel Olympia Rekord P". The next year a reduced specification 1,196 cc powered version was introduced called simply the "Opel Olympia".

In July 1959 the standard model, at the same time as receiving more power, became simply the "Opel Rekord". The cut-price "Opel Olympia" was now stripped even of its former name, being branded from 1959 simply as the "Opel 1200". This stripped down, cut-price version continued to be produced with the Rekord P1 body for over two years after the mainstream model had migrated to the Rekord P2 body. The Opel 1200 was only available with two-door sedan bodywork.

It was also offered as the Opel 1500 with a 1.5 litre engine.

== Mechanical ==
The new car received a newly developed front axle with negative camber and a new steering system incorporating paired control arms of uneven lengths.

The transmission was a three speed manual system controlled using a column mounted lever. That was a similar arrangement to that on the previous model which had received an all-synchromesh gear box for its final year: for the new model synchromesh was included for all three forward ratios from the beginning.

The 1488cc engine had also been uprated for the final year's production on the previous model's production run, and now provided a claimed 45 hp maximum power output at 3900 rpm.

Although the P1 changed very little outwardly during its year production run, the three-year period would be characterized by several important changes to the engines and to other mechanical elements.

== Body ==
The car was launched as a two-door saloon in 1957. In 1958 a four-door version became available: a three-door estate and panel van versions were also introduced in 1958. The panel van used the same body as the estate but with the rear side windows replaced with metal windows. Applying the English language statement "It is a car and a van" Opel branded this version as the CarAVan, a name which would continue to be applied to Opel estates, albeit in later years without the eccentric use of upper case letters, for several decades. For this version, the standard three-leaf rear leaf springs were replaced with more robust four-leaf equivalents. The CarAVan was particularly popular with self-employed tradesman, combining most of the driving characteristics of a car with the load-carrying potential of a small commercial vehicle.

A small number of cabriolet and coupé versions were also produced by the Darmstadt body builders Autenreith. These are extremely rare. It is thought 25 cabriolets were produced of which 4 survive: 2 of the 3 recorded coupés are also believed still to exist.

== Expanding the range downmarket ==
A year after the introduction of the Opel Olympia Rekord P1, Opel introduced a more basic version of the same car, featuring a reduced bore version of the otherwise familiar engine, to provide an engine capacity of 1205cc. This car had a higher compression ratio of 7.5:1, but the maximum power was nevertheless only 40 hp (29 kW) at 4,400 rpm and torque was also reduced. On introduction this car was branded as the "Opel Olympia", although in 1959 it was rebadged as the Opel 1200. Apart from the reduced name and engine size, this version also made do without most of the chrome adornment which was a feature of the standard Olympia Rekord, and the interior was also simplified.

== Evolution ==
=== Small improvements in 1958 ===
Even though the exterior remained little changed during its life, the car nevertheless underwent various improvements. When production restarted after the 1958 summer holiday shut-down, the interior mirror had been moved from its position on the top of the dashboard to a position at the top of the windscreen, improving the rear view for most drivers. It was also in 1958 that the windscreen wipers received their own electric motor: hitherto they had been mechanically powered from the camshaft with the help of a flexible linkage, a solution which Opel had first employed in 1937 on the Super Six.

=== Upgraded engines in 1959 ===
For 1959 the engines were upgraded. The Opel Olympia Rekord P1 (by now badged simply as the Opel Rekord) retained its 1,488 cc engine size, but claimed maximum power was now 50 hp at 4000 rpm. Responding (presumably) to the steady increase in the octane of standard fuel at this time, the compression ratio on the 1,488 cc engine was also raised from 6.9:1 to 7.25:1. The power increase was also helped by modifications to the cylinder head and exhaust manifold. Nevertheless, in most respects the 1,488 cc engine remained little changed since Opel had first installed it in the 1937 Opel Olympia.

1959 was also the year that a larger engine was available as an option. It shared the 75mm stroke of the 1,488 cc engine (and of the 1,196 cc engine fitted in the down-market Olympia and 1200 models) but the bore was increased from 80 to 85 mm, providing an increase in engine capacity to 1,680 cc. Maximum speed, which was given as 125 km/h (78 mph) for the 1,488 cc power car, was raised to 132 km/h (82 mph) with the larger engine which also offered a useful increase in available torque.

=== Semi-automatic optional from 1959 ===
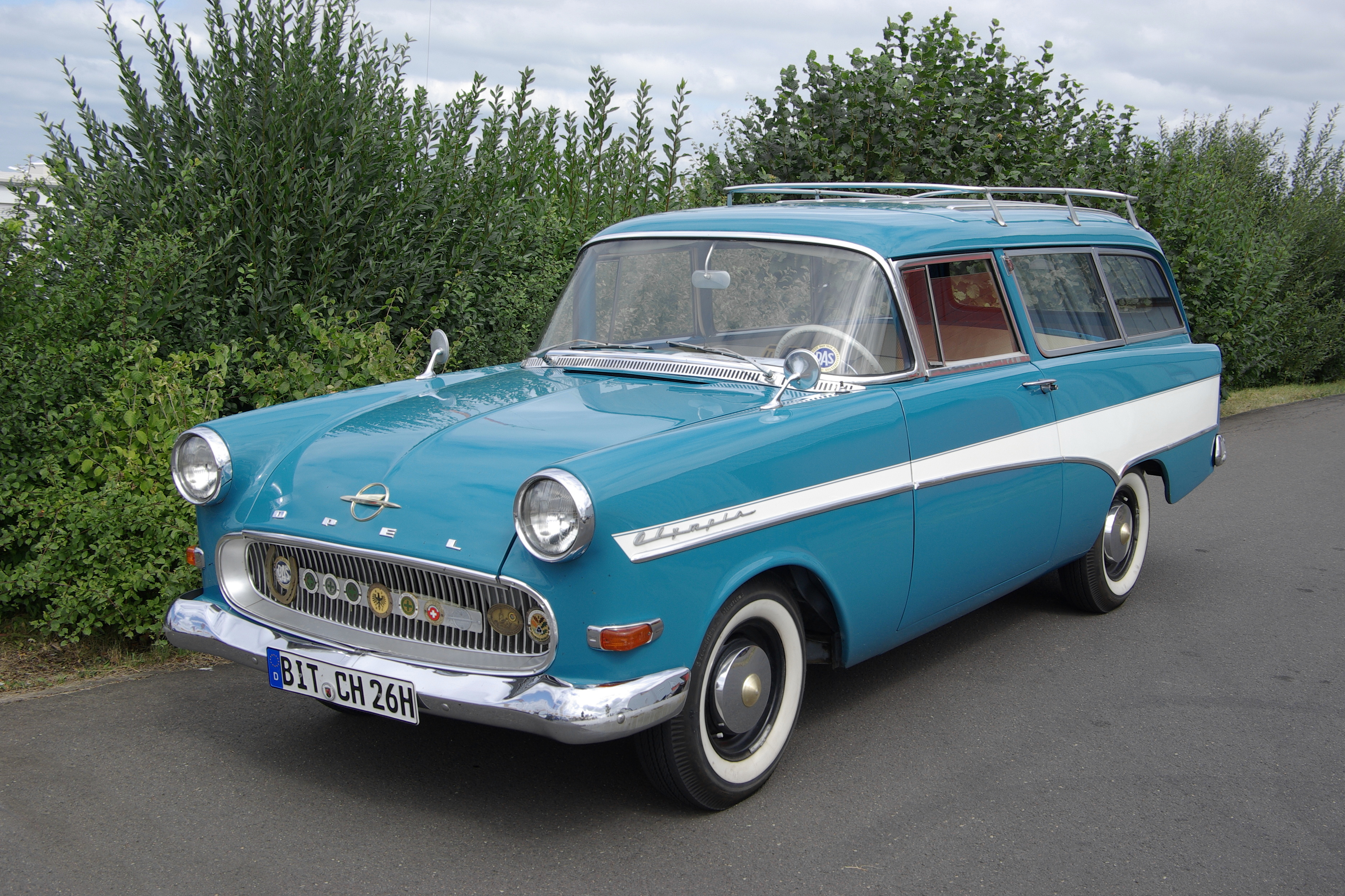
1960 Opel Olympia Rekord P1 1500 Caravan, 1488 cc, 4 cylinder, 45 hp, original condition.

For its final year, the P1 was offered with an "Olymat" automatic clutch provided by Fichel & Sachs. The system was broadly similar to the "Saxomat" automatic clutch beginning to be offered at this time by other German automakers. On the Opel it was not particularly popular.

== Swiss assembly ==
Since 1934 General Motors had operated a small assembly operation on a site behind the train station in Biel. By 1959 a small number of Opel Rekord P1s were being assembled at the General Motors factory in Biel. These cars came only with the larger 1,680 cc 55 hp engine. They carried even more exterior chrome than the "normal" Rekord P1, and came in two-tone paint work, the roof colour being always white. The interior trim was also finished in a two-tone colour scheme, and employed leather upholstery. The Swiss assembled cars were sold only in Switzerland: only ten are thought to survive.

Perhaps of most significance to subsequent generations of Opel drivers was the name of the Swiss assembled Rekord: It was badged as the "Opel Rekord Ascona", after the resort on the Ticinese north shore of Lake Maggiore. The Ascona name would reappear just over ten years later on a new volume model introduced as Opel's answer to the Fords Taunus and Cortina.

== South African assembly ==
The Rekord P1 was also assembled (like its successor) at the General Motors plant in South Africa: here the steering wheel had to be positioned on the right side of the car. A special pickup truck version was also produced for the local market. A few of these were produced with the steering wheel on the left side of the car and exported to Europe.

South African Rekords and Olympias originally received the 1.5-liter engine with 55 hp SAE (41 kW). For 1960 the 1.7-liter engine was installed in all but the lowliest two-door Olympia, offering 63 hp SAE (47 kW).

== Commercial ==
At launch, the entry level 1,488 cc two-door Rekord came with a manufacturer's recommended price of DM 6,385. In this price bracket its most obvious competitor was the slightly shorter but also slightly wider and more powerful Ford Taunus 17M.

During the three-year period between 1957 and 1960 Opel recorded production of 817,003 Olympia Rekords. It was still produced at about half the rate of the Volkswagen Beetle, but it was repeatedly West Germany's second best seller. During the same three years Ford recorded production of 239,978 Ford Taunus 17Ms.

Slightly more than 50% of the Rekord P1s were exported, mostly within continental western Europe. The manufacturer also promoted the model strongly in the USA where arrangements were put in place for it to be sold through the Buick dealer network. The Rekord P1 won a reputation as a reliable car representing good value for money. Its memory endured and on 2 October 2003 it was commemorated in a ceremony attended by the German President who was presented with a greatly enlarged image of a new 55 Pfennig postage stamp depicting the Rekord P1.

== Technical data ==
Opel (Olympia) Rekord P1 (1957–1960)
	Opel Olympia / 1200 (1958–62)	Opel Olympia Rekord 1500 (1957–60)	Opel Rekord 1500 (1959–60)	Opel Rekord 1700 (1959–60)
Engine:	Four-stroke straight-four engine			
Bore × Stroke:	72 mm × 74 mm (2.8 in × 2.9 in)	80 mm × 74 mm (3.1 in × 2.9 in)		85 mm × 74 mm (3.3 in × 2.9 in)
Displacement:	1,196 cc (73.0 cu in)	1,488 cc (90.8 cu in)		1,680 cc (102.5 cu in)
Max. power:	40 PS (29 kW) at 4400 rpm	45 PS (33 kW) at 3900 rpm	50 PS (37 kW) at 4000 rpm	55 PS (40 kW) at 4000 rpm
Max. torque:	82 N⋅m (60 lb⋅ft) at 2500 rpm	98 N⋅m (72 lb⋅ft) at 2300 rpm	106 N⋅m (78 lb⋅ft) at 2100 rpm	120 N⋅m (89 lb⋅ft) at 2100 rpm
Compression ratio:	7.5:1	6.9:1	7.25:1	
Fuel feed:	Opel downdraft carburetor (licensed from Carter) with 30 mm Ø			
Valve gear:	Two overhead valves per cylinder, cam-in-block, pushrods and rocker arms			
Cooling:	Water-cooled			
Transmission:	3–speed manual, column shift			
Front suspension:	Double wishbone suspension with balljoints, coil springs, and hydraulic dampers			
Rear suspension:	Live axle with semi-elliptical leaf springs and hydraulic dampers — Caravan has an extra leaf			
Brakes:	Hydraulically activated drum brakes, Ø 200 mm (Caravan rear Ø 230 mm)			
Body and chassis:	Steel unibody chassis with steel body			
Track front/back:	1,260 / 1,270 mm (49.6 / 50.0 in)			
Wheelbase:	2,541 mm (100.0 in)			
Length:	4,433 mm (174.5 in)			
Unladen weight:	910–975 kg (2,006.2–2,149.5 lb) (Caravan: 1,000–1,015 kg (2,204.6–2,237.7 lb))			
Top speed:	119 km/h (74 mph)	125–128 km/h (78–80 mph)		130–132 km/h (81–82 mph)
0–100 km/h:	33 s	24–27 s		20–22 s
Fuel consumption:	9.0 l/100 km 31.4 mpg_{‑imp}; 26.1 mpg_{‑US} Regular	9.5–10.5 l/100 km 29.7–26.9 mpg_{‑imp}; 24.8–22.4 mpg_{‑US} Regular		10.0–10.5 l/100 km 28.2–26.9 mpg_{‑imp}; 23.5–22.4 mpg_{‑US} Regular
