= Vauxhall Carlton =

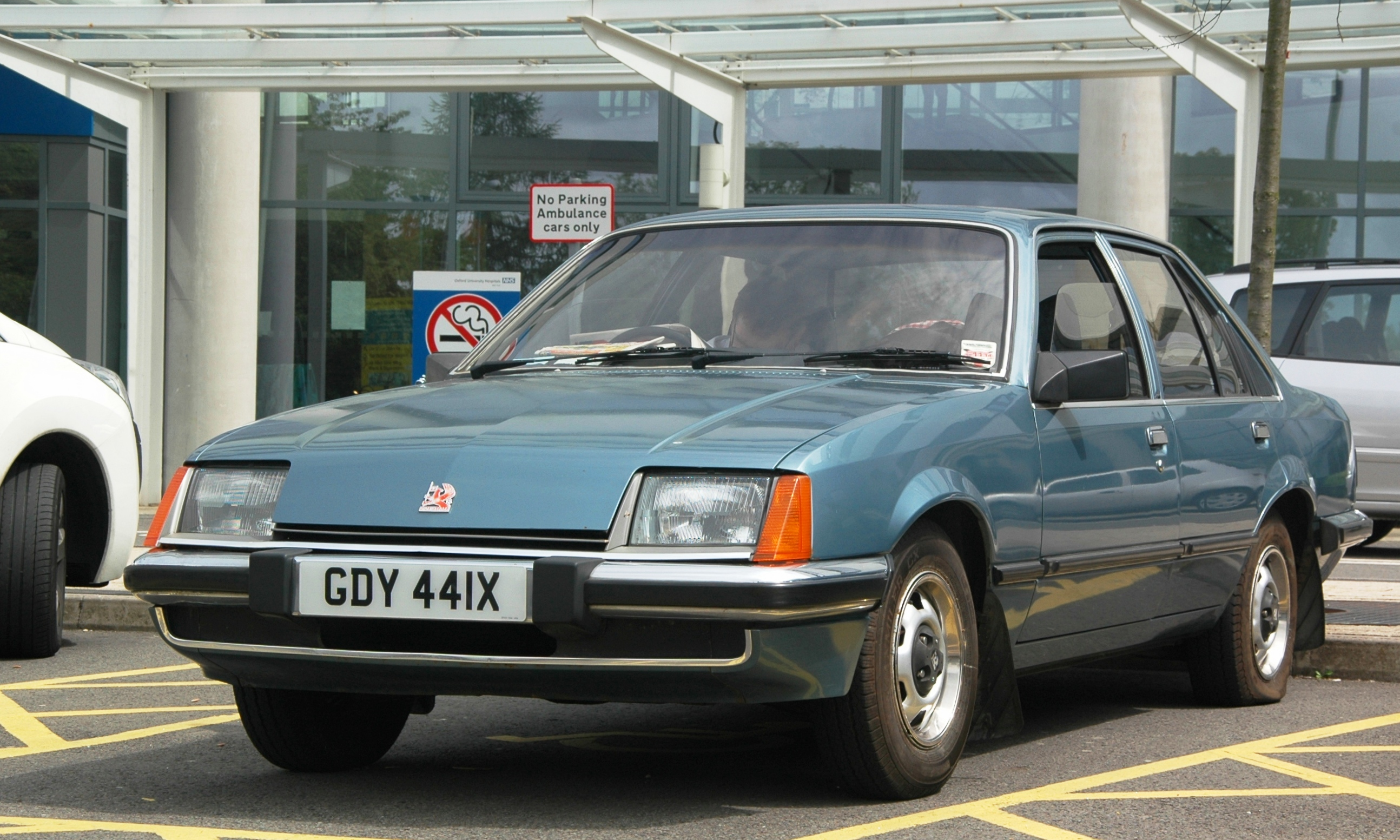
- Pre-facelift Carlton Mk 1 saloon

Overview
- Manufacturer: Vauxhall (General Motors)
- Also called: Opel Rekord E; Opel Omega A
- Production: 1978–1994
- Assembly: United Kingdom: Luton (Mk.1); West Germany: Rüsselsheim (Mk.2)

Body and chassis
- Class: Executive car
- Body style: 4-door saloon; 5-door estate
- Layout: FR layout
- Platform: GM V-body
- Related: Opel Rekord; Holden VB Commodore; Holden VC Commodore; Holden VH Commodore

Chronology
- Predecessor: Vauxhall Victor/VX series
- Successor: Vauxhall Omega

The Vauxhall Carlton is a series of large family car/executive car sold in two distinct generations by the Vauxhall division of GM Europe between 1978 and 1994. The Carlton was based on the Opel Rekord E (Mk.1) and Omega A (Mk.2).

With the exception of the pre-facelift Mk.1 cars, most Carltons were manufactured by Opel in Rüsselsheim, and differed only from their Opel Rekord/Omega sisters in badging and trim.

It was replaced by the Omega B in 1994, mirroring the standardisation of model names across both GM Europe brands.

== Mark I (1978–1986) ==
Main Article: Opel Rekord E

The first Vauxhall Carlton was introduced in September 1978 as a replacement for the ageing VX1800/VX2300 saloons, built in Luton from components made at the Opel plant at Rüsselsheim. Whilst its predecessor was loosely based on the Opel Rekord D, the relationship between the Carlton and the corresponding Opel Rekord E was much more obvious - being essentially the same car, retaining Opel-sourced powertrains, but with Vauxhall's typical "droop snoot" front end (which had debuted three years earlier with the Chevette and Cavalier) that featured no traditional grille, and a slightly different rear end with the number plate moved down to the rear bumper. The other difference was the dashboard, which featured the hooded instrument binnacle going across the whole width of the car with wooden embellishment, compared to the plainer dash of the Rekord. It was a traditional large saloon or estate with rear-wheel drive and a spacious, comfortable interior and was available in "L" trim only. Power came from a 2.0–litre carburettor Opel CIH engine which gave reasonable performance, refinement and economy. There were some impressive options available, including central door locking, alloy wheels and electric windows, which gave it an advantage over most of its similarly-priced competitors.

It was designed to compete directly with the Ford Granada, which was consistently the most popular car of that size in Britain during the 1970s. It also competed with British Leyland's Princess and Rover SD1 model ranges, as well as foreign competitors including the Citroën CX and Renault 20/30. It was launched shortly before the Peugeot 505.

=== Relationship with other models ===
Lengthened, more powerful models, based on the Carlton and Rekord, were also available. Positioned directly above them was the Vauxhall Viceroy which was a Carlton with the larger 2.5 L or 3.0 L six-cylinder Opel cam-in-head engine (CIH) (the corresponding Opel was the Opel Commodore), and differed also in that it featured a chrome grille with the "white cross" motif (from the VX4/90) in place of the Carlton's painted droop snoot nose. The Viceroy/Commodore however sold poorly and were discontinued after the "E2" facelift in 1982, and a six-cylinder engine would not appear in the Carlton again until the MK2 GSi 3000 model. As with the Opel Rekord E, being a member of the V-body family; the Carlton also has commonality with the Holden Commodore produced for the Australian and New Zealand markets.

The Vauxhall Royale and Vauxhall Royale Coupé were in essence, long wheelbase versions of the Carlton/Viceroy with altered "six light" styling that were positioned at the top end of the range only featuring six-cylinder engines. These were essentially badge engineered versions of the Opel Senator and Monza, respectively, although a confusing situation resulted in the United Kingdom as a result of General Motors' decision to merge the Vauxhall and Opel dealer networks and marketing - the Royale was dropped at the 1982 facelift and was relaunched in the UK as the Opel Senator and Monza for the 1983 model year, but the former changed back to Vauxhall badging for the 1985 model year. The Monza continued as an Opel until it was deleted in 1987.

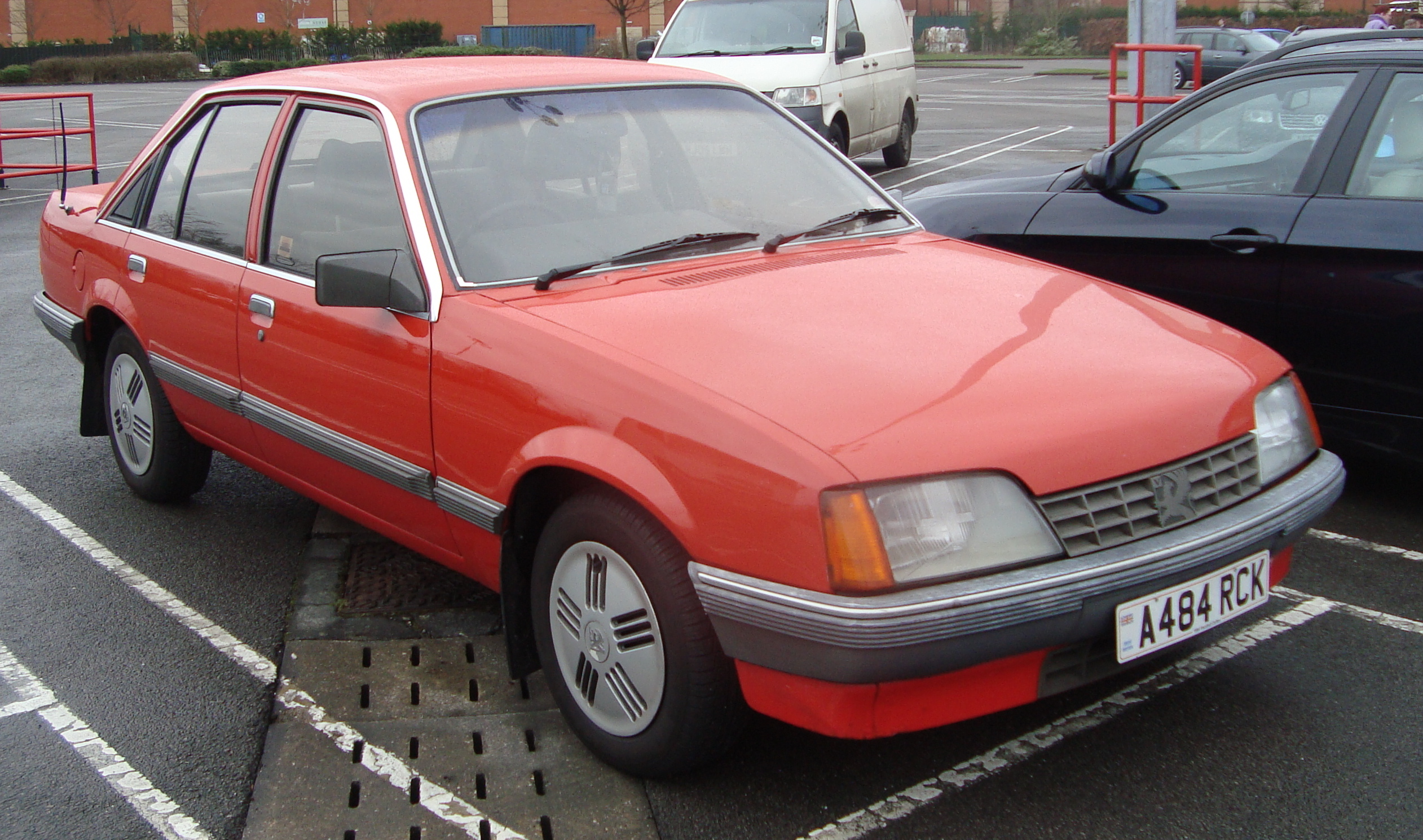
Post-facelift Vauxhall Carlton Mark I saloon

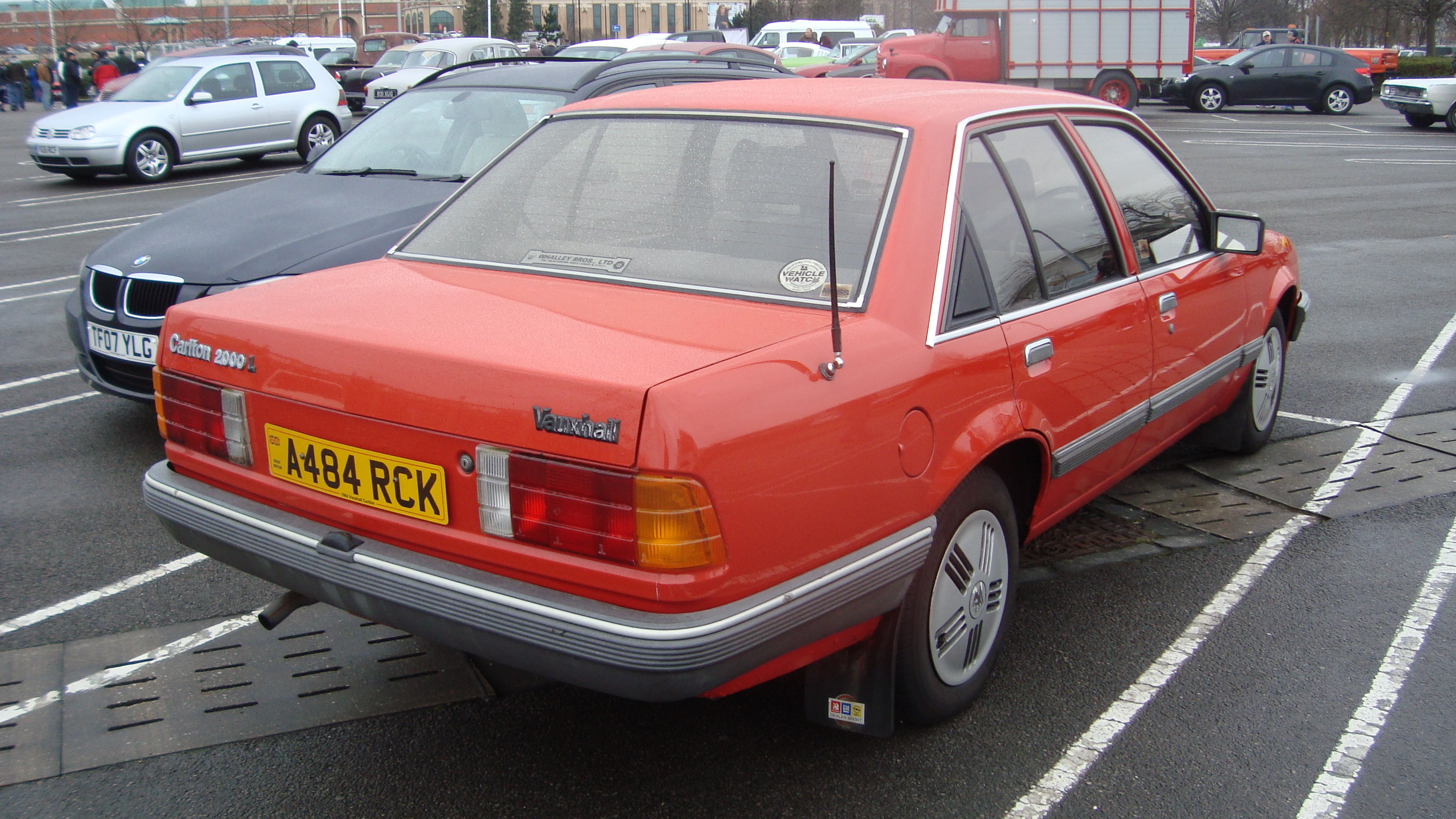
Post-facelift Vauxhall Carlton Mark I saloon

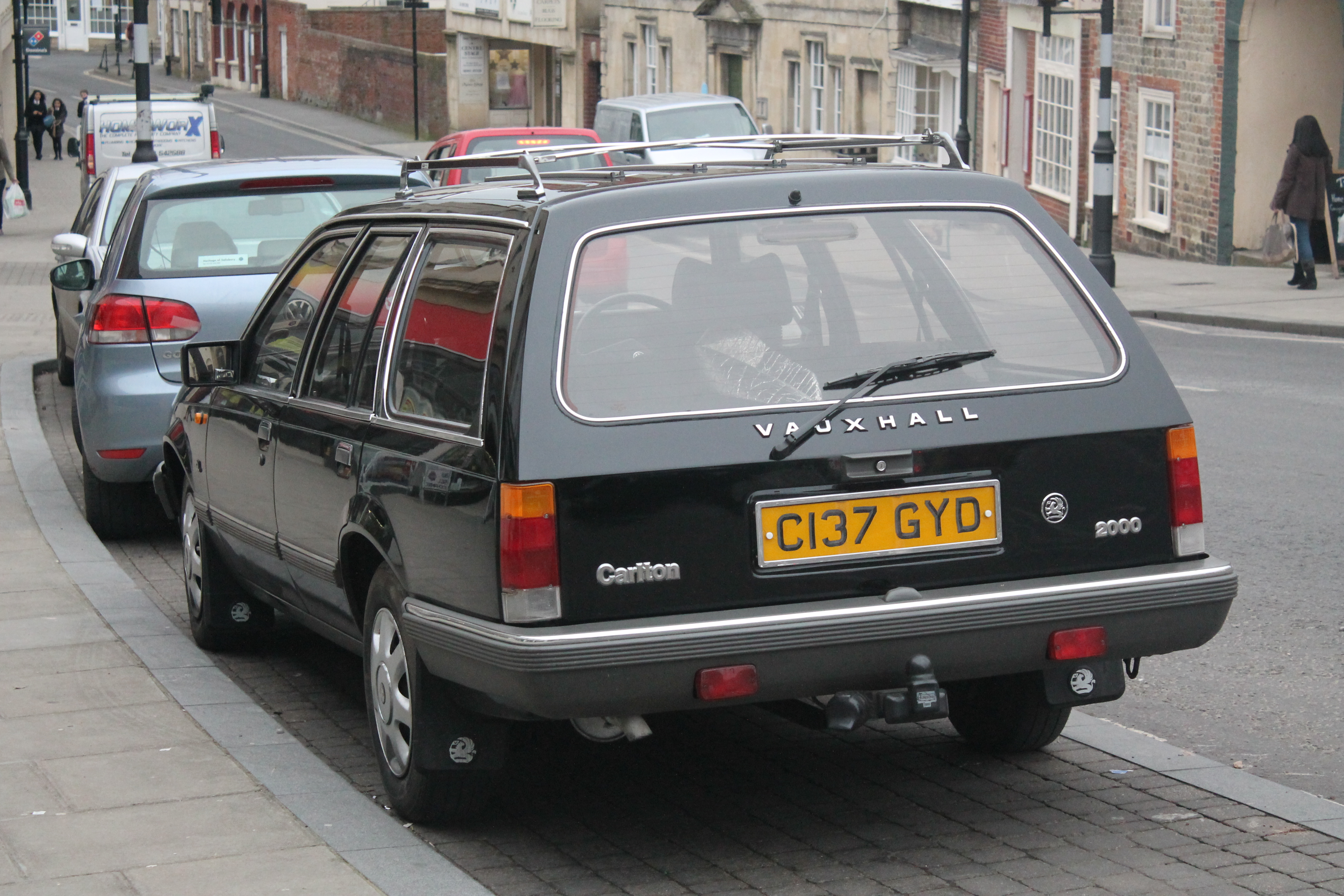
Post-facelift Vauxhall Carlton Mark I estate

The Carlton was also sold in left hand drive in continental European markets, including the Netherlands, Belgium, the Scandinavian countries, Italy, and Portugal, alongside its Rekord counterpart.

=== Facelift ===
The introduction of the facelifted "E2" Opel Rekord in 1982, marked the convergence of both the Rekord and Carlton (and in fact the final convergence of the Opel and Vauxhall ranges as a whole), with both cars now differing only in badging, whilst UK production ceased and all Carltons were built alongside their Rekord sisters in Rüsselsheim. The update saw the disappearance of the droop snoot front, in favour of a more traditional (though still angled) grille shared with the Rekord. The rear was reprofiled with a higher boot lid and new rear lamps. Both cars also shared the new dashboard moulding and redesigned interior. This also marked the end of UK sale of the Opel Rekord, as the Opel brand was being phased out in the UK, as well as the sale of the Carlton outside the UK, as the Vauxhall brand was withdrawn from the rest of Europe.

The 1983 facelift also saw the introduction of a wider engine range with the Family II engine from the Ascona/Cavalier in a 1.8 L carburettor form, whilst the older CIH unit continued in the 2.0 L carburettor and 2.0 L fuel injection form. In 1984, a range topping 2.2 L CIH fuel injected petrol became available in the CD trim. A 2.3 L diesel version was also available . A wider range of trim levels consisting of "L", "GL" and "CD" were also introduced at this time. A 2.0 L fuel injection engine was introduced for the 1984 model year and was replaced by a 2.2 L fuel injection engine for 1985.

== Mark II (1986–1994) ==
Main Article: Opel Omega A

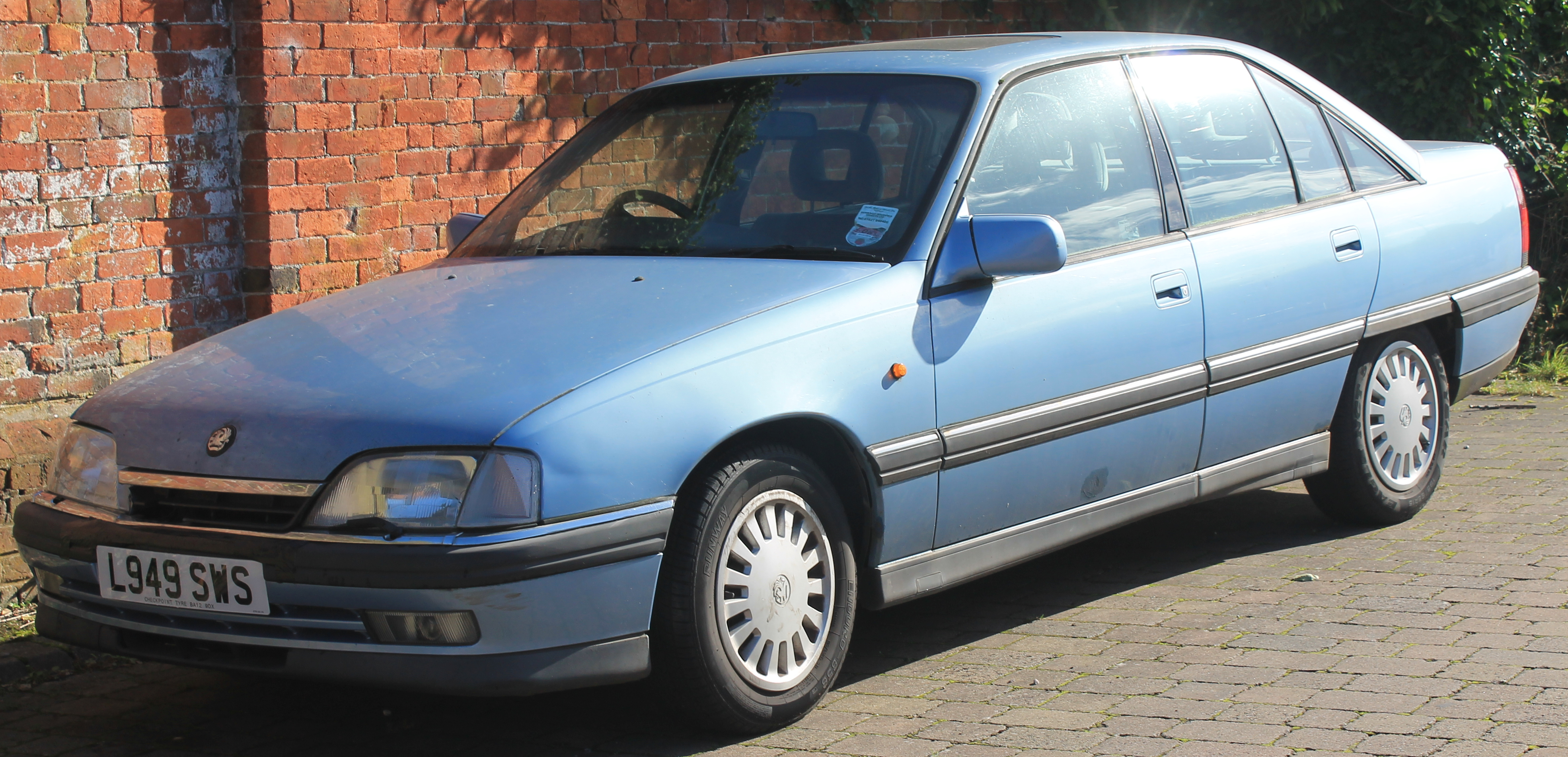
1993 Mark II Carlton GL 2.0 i sedan

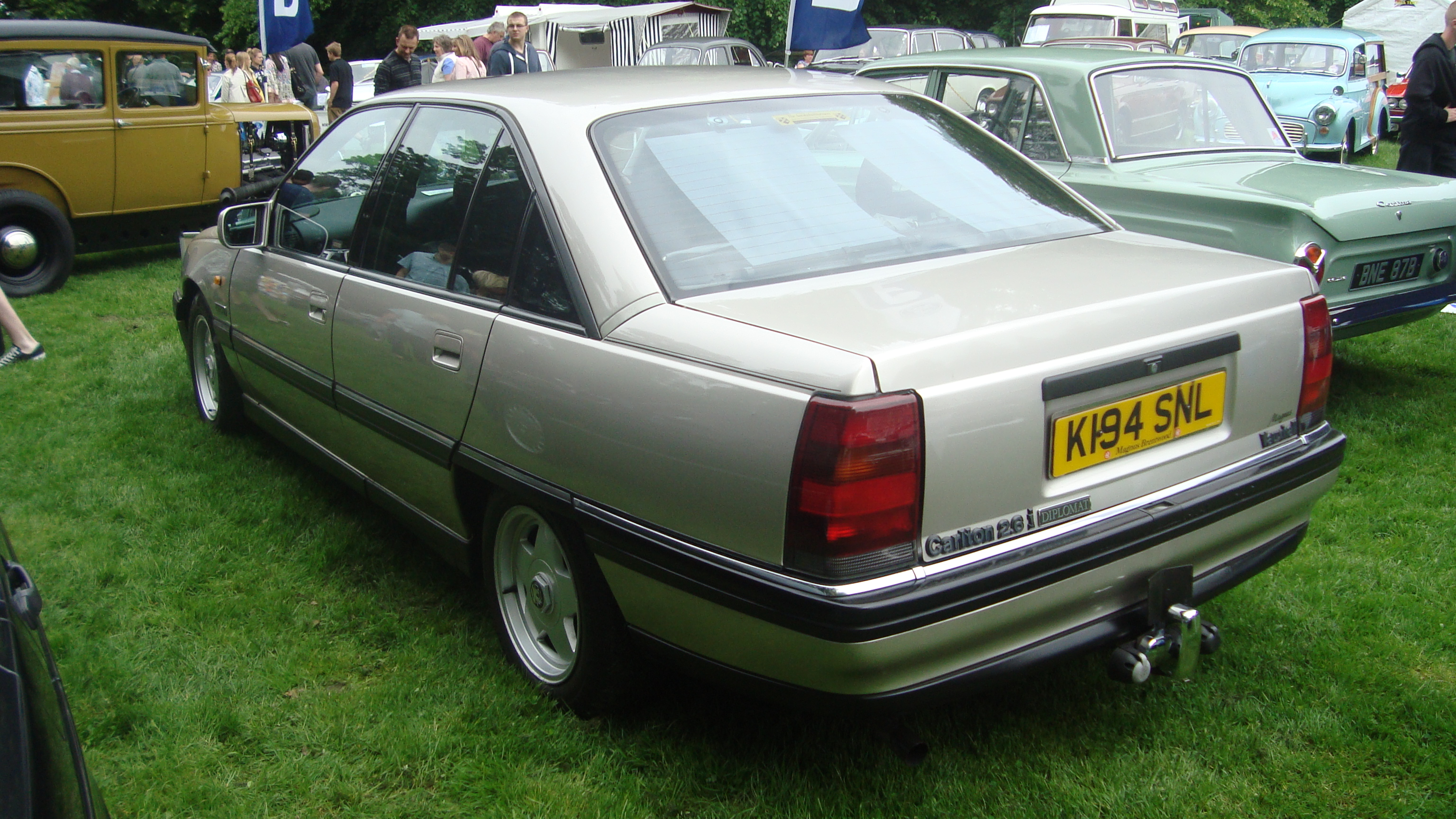
1992 MK II Vauxhall Carlton 2.6i Diplomat sedan

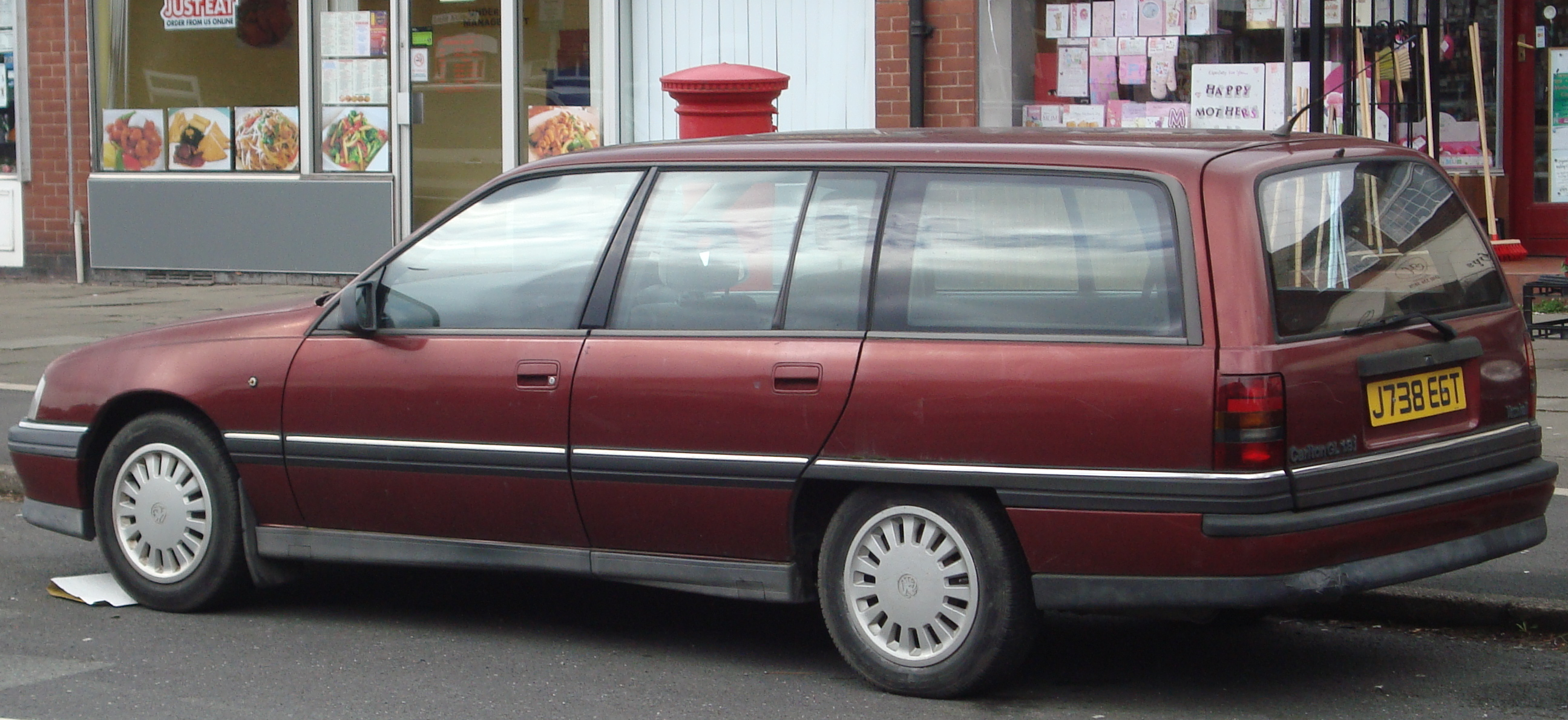
1992 Mark II 1.8 GL estate

Opel chose to name its 1986 replacement car in this segment Omega rather than Rekord. Vauxhall stayed with the Carlton name. On its launch in November 1986 the Vauxhall Carlton / Opel Omega saloon and estate range earned itself the accolade of European Car of the Year - the second Vauxhall/Opel product to achieve this distinction, two years after the Astra/Kadett won the accolade.

=== Relationship with other models ===
The Carlton (Omega A) shared its platform again with the Senator this time known in both Opel and Vauxhall forms by the same name: Senator. Interior dashboard and trim also differed The Senator body-shell was different between the B and C/D pillars, and used different rear doors and a larger rear quarter-light, resulting in a higher roof-line at the rear, in order to give rear seat passengers slightly better headroom. This had a corresponding effect on the aerodynamics, with the Carlton achieving a drag coefficient of Cd=0.28 against the Senator's Cd=0.30.

The same GM V platform was also used in Holden variants and other GM products.

Vauxhall scrapped the Carlton nameplate in early 1994, but the name of its Opel equivalent, the Omega, lived on, as it was applied to the Carlton's replacement, the Opel Omega B1. Although the models had always shared the same platform, and the replacement was again based on the GM V Platform, GM had the Vauxhall equivalent adopt the Opel name (a drive towards homogenization of European market model names was taking place throughout the range) and so the Carlton's replacement was sold as the Vauxhall Omega. There was no equivalent up-market Senator variant in the new range.

=== Mark II engine line-up ===
All of the 4-cylinder engines available in the Carlton Mk II were the GM Family II engines in 1.8L and 2.0L capacities. The Opel Omega A was offered with a large 2.4L Opel CIH engine in certain European markets, but this variant was never offered in the Carlton. New to the Carlton's line-up with the Mark II were two straight-6 engines with 2.6 and 3.0–litres. These were both 12-valve engines, again from the Opel CIH family, but later 3.0-litre models were offered with 24-valves, producing much more power and torque. As well, Vauxhall used the "Dual-Ram" intake manifold, which lets the car breathe as two separate three-cylinder engines below 4,000 rpm, but changes the intake manifold profile at 4000 rpm to increase the runner length, thus increasing total engine output.

In addition to the straight-6 engines there was a range of straight-4s. Starting with the 1.8-litre family 2 engine, and including the 2.0L C20NE, with 115PS and 125lb.ft torque. There was also a 2.3 turbo diesel available with 100PS and 160lb.ft torque.

=== Special Lotus version ===
In 1990, Vauxhall launched a high performance 377 bhp (281 kW) Lotus Carlton in collaboration with Lotus Cars. (An Opel version was also produced as the Lotus Omega.) It was built with a 3615 cc six-cylinder twin-turbo engine (designated C36GET) capable of over 176 mph (283 km/h), making it officially (for the time) the fastest full four-seater that had ever been made. It cost £48,000 – well over double the price of a standard Carlton. As a result, Vauxhall's original plans to sell about 1,000 in the UK ended in 440 UK cars being sold. For those with less money there was the 3000GSi 24v, with a top speed of 146 mph (235 km/h).

=== GSi 3000 & Diamond ===
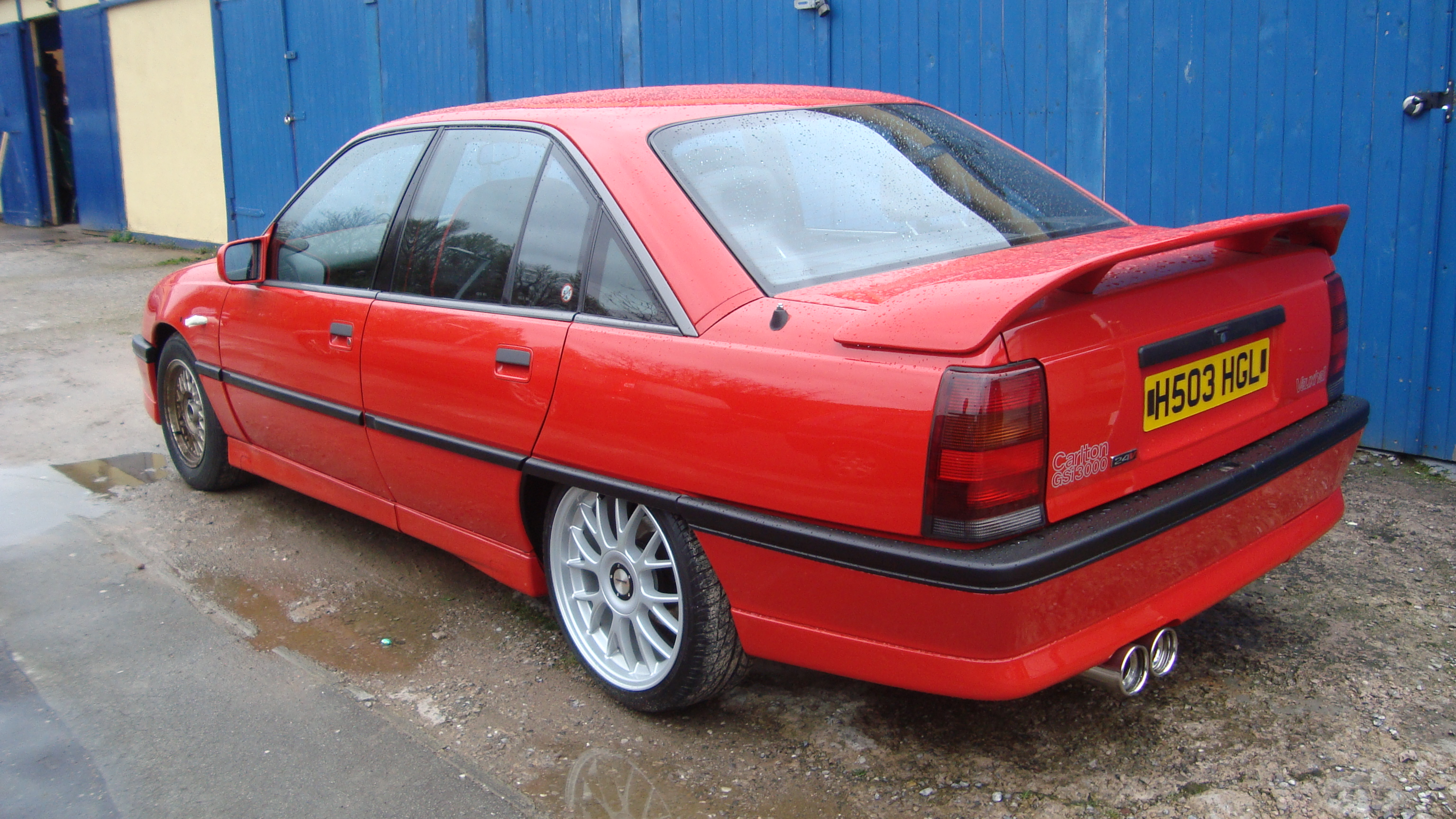
GSi 24v

Prior to the Lotus tuned version, the range topper was the GSi 3000 upon which the Lotus Carlton was based. At launch in 1986 it had 177 hp (130 kW) giving it a top speed of 134 mph (216 km/h). In 1990, power was increased by going from two valves per cylinder to four, creating a 24-valve engine, resulting in 204 hp (150 kW) which allowed 0-62 mph to be dispatched in 7.6 seconds and increased the top speed to 149 mph (240 km/h). It was also available with an Automatic gearbox, which reduced the top speed to 146 mph (235 km/h) and increased the 0–62 mph time to 8.6 seconds. There was also a Carlton Diamond 3.0 24v Estate available. Identical to the GSI but with an estate body shell and without some of the sporting accoutrements, it sold in much more limited numbers (90) and so is a much rarer sight.

=== Guinness World Record ===
In June 1992 two teams from Horley Round Table, Surrey, UK, set a Guinness World Record time of 77 hours 34 minutes, driving a total 6,700 km across the then 12 EC countries in two Vauxhall Carlton 24V 3000 GSi's (J870 FFM and J751 DYC). The Carltons were provided by Vauxhall Motors and the record attempt was also supported by Mobil Oil and the Royal Automobile Club.

== Survival rate ==
As of September 2023, 206 examples of the Carlton were still on Britain's roads, with most remaining examples believed to be the high performance 3000 GSi and Lotus versions of the MK2 model.
