= Opel Monza =

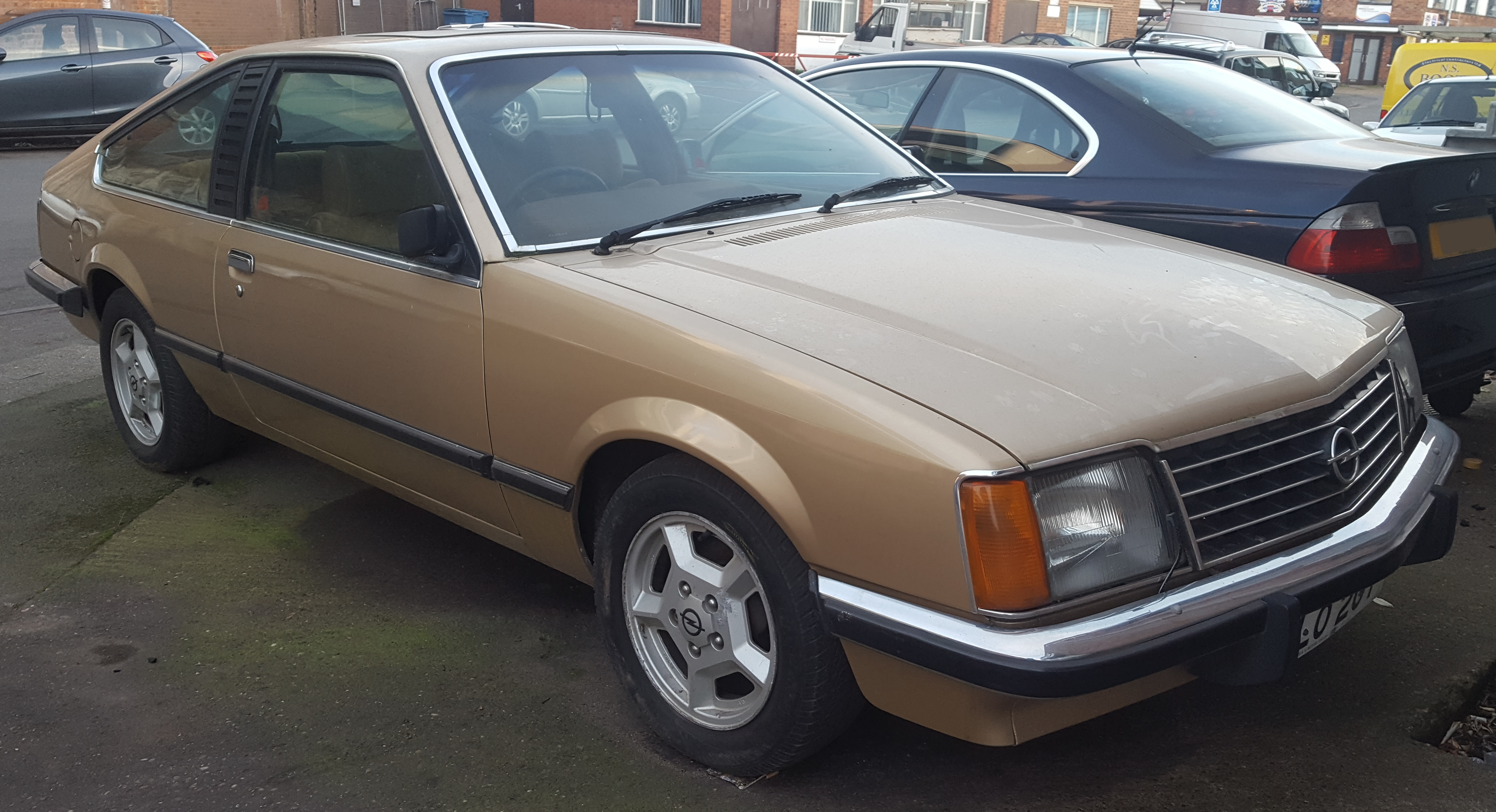

Overview
- Manufacturer: Opel
- Also called: Vauxhall Royale Coupé
- Production: 1977–1986
- Assembly: West Germany: Rüsselsheim
- Designer: George Gallion

Body and chassis
- Class: Executive car (E)
- Body style: 2-door fastback coupé
- Layout: Front-engine, rear-wheel-drive
- Platform: V platform
- Related: Bitter SC Coupé; Opel Senator A

Powertrain
- Engine: 2.0E, 2.5E, 2.8S, 3.0S, 3.0E, 3.0E GSE
- Transmission: A1: 3-speed automatic 4-speed manual A2: 4-speed automatic 5-speed manual

Dimensions
- Wheelbase: 2,670 mm (105.1 in)
- Length: 4,692 mm (184.7 in)
- Width: 1,734 mm (68.3 in)
- Height: 1,380 mm (54.3 in)
- Curb weight: 1,375–1,420 kg (3,031–3,131 lb)

Chronology
- Predecessor: Opel Commodore Coupé

The Opel Monza is an executive fastback coupe produced by the German automaker Opel from 1977 to 1986. It was marketed in the United Kingdom as the Vauxhall Royale Coupé by Vauxhall.

== Monza A1 (1977–1982) ==
The Monza was planned as a successor for the Commodore Coupé. In the late 1970s the Commodore C model was made as a two-door version (as was the Rekord E1), but still as a sedan type car. The first model of the Commodore the "A" series had a regular coupé in the production line and Opel desired to make a newer version of their large luxury coupé. Work began in 1976 and in 1978 the first Monzas were available to buy. The cars to compete with would be the Mercedes-Benz C123 and later the Mercedes-Benz C124 and the BMW 6 Series (E24) models (coupe models), and any other large luxury coupe. There was plenty of space inside for the class, and the seats were upmarket.

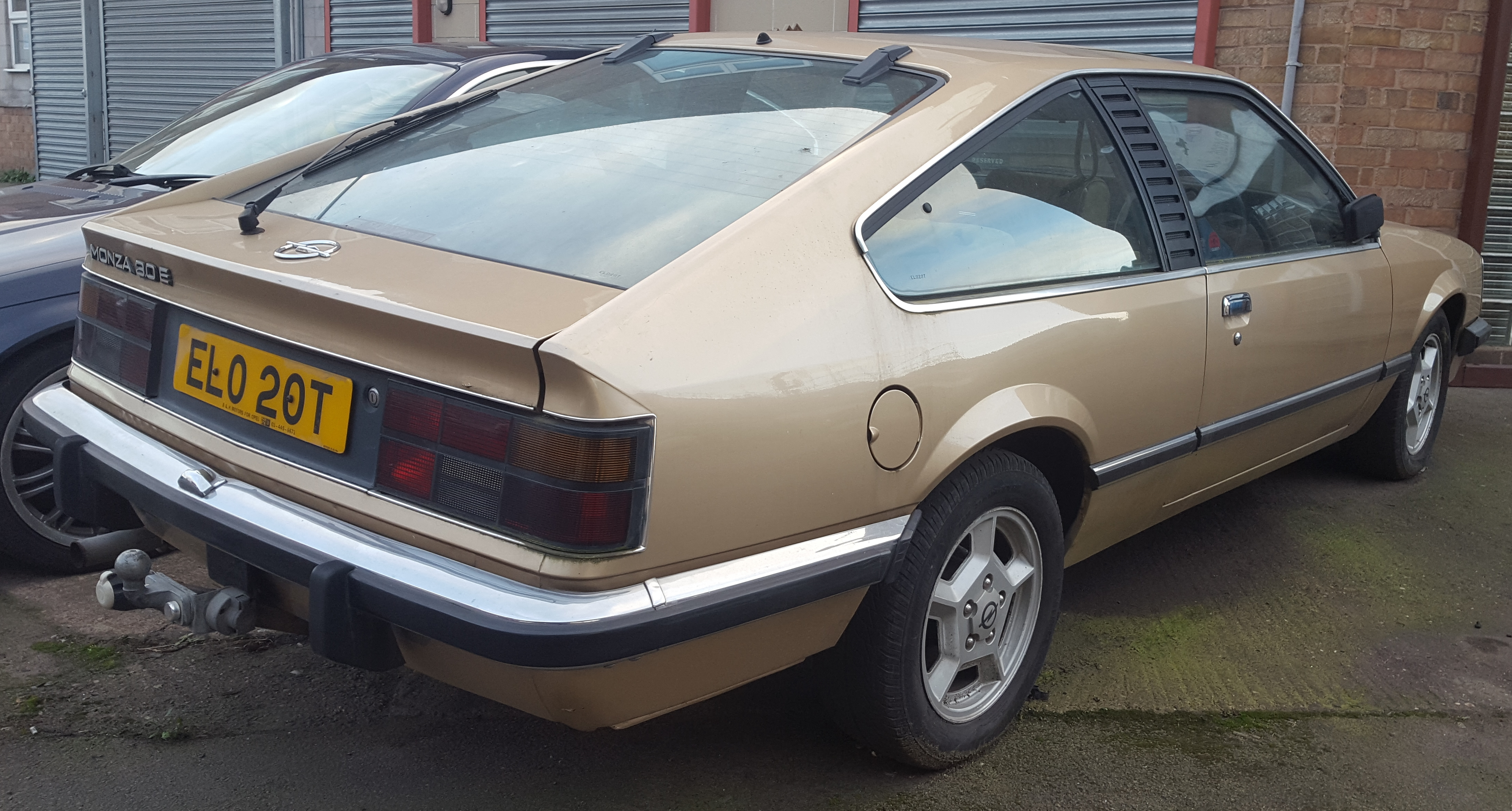
Opel Monza coupe rear (1977–1982)

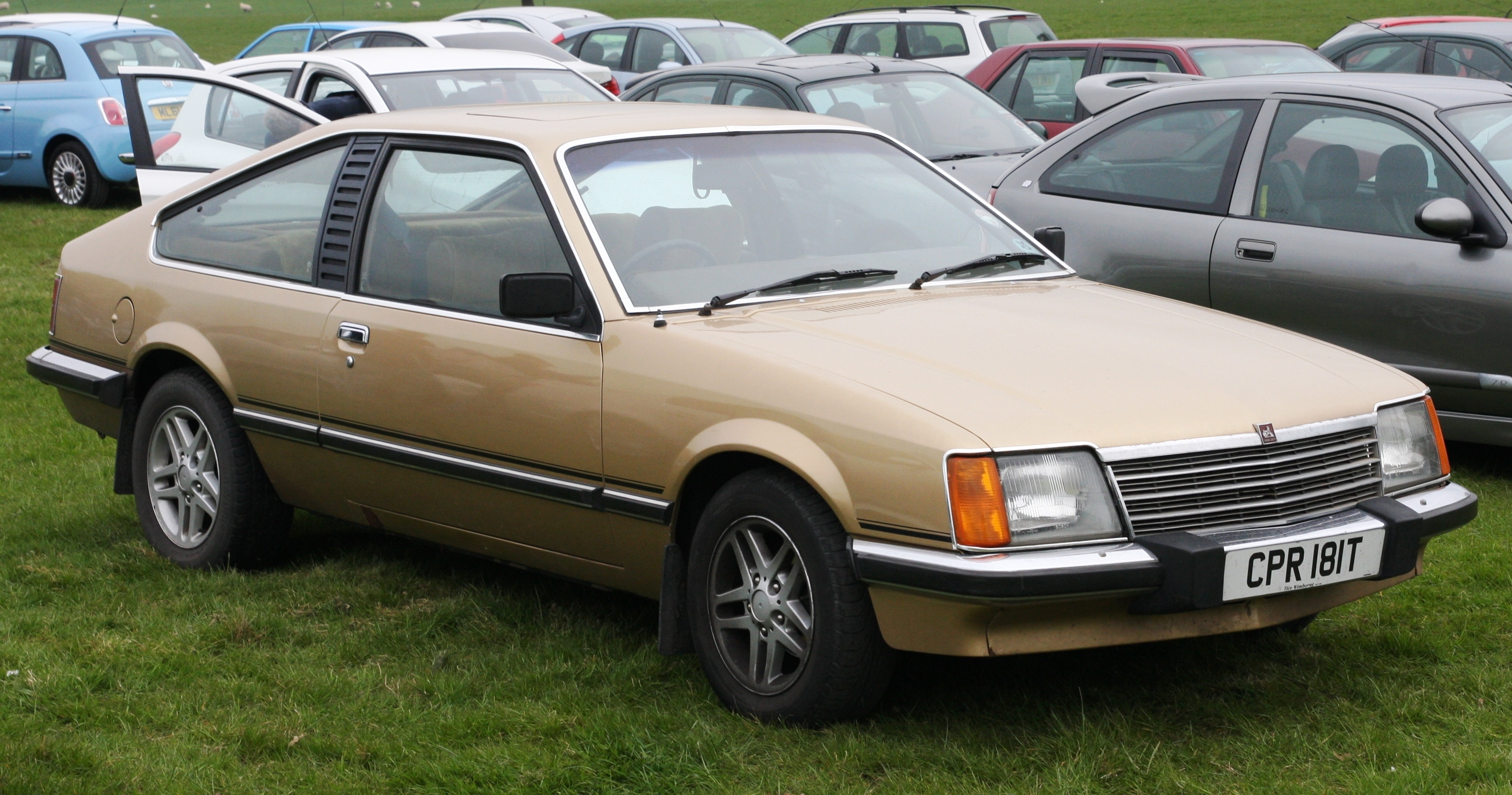
Vauxhall Royale coupe

The internals consisted of parts mainly borrowed from the Rekord E1 and later the E2, which meant cloth seats, and much plastic on the dashboard and inner doors. Even the rev counter and the tachometer were taken directly from the Rekord E models. The model experienced some gearbox problems. The engine range for the Monza A1 consisting of the 3.0S, the 2.8S, the newly developed 3.0E and later the 2.5E (the 3.0 had 180 bhp and 248 Nm with fuel injection), gave a wide range. The three-speed Borg Warner automatic transmission from the Commodore range needed to be modified to cope with the new and improved power outputs. Opel's own four-speed manual gearboxes were not up to the job and, instead of putting in a more modern five-speed manual gearbox, Opel turned to gearbox and transmission producer Getrag, and installed the Getrag 264 four-speed manual gearbox in the early Monzas. But when people bought a big, luxurious coupé they wanted modern products as well, and Opel obliged, as soon the Getrag 240 (for the 2.5 engines) and the Getrag 265 (for the 3.0E), both 5-speed manual gearboxes, replaced the old 4-speed gearbox.

The Monza, however, sharing the same layout as the Senator A1, had very good driving abilities. It handled well, thanks to the newly developed MacPherson strut system for the front of the car, as used on the Rekord E1 and E2, and the new independent rear suspension gave the car soft, yet firm, driving characteristics and excellent stability for such a big car. The engine range, however non-economical, was also very good, and few problems with the extremely reliable engines. The six-cylinder engines were all overhead camshaft. Many parts on the engine, such as the water pump and drive train were the same parts as used on the four-cylinder version. This meant that this was an engine not only tested for many years in the Commodore, Admiral and Diplomat range, but also very reliable. Although the first generation of 3.0E engines in the Monza A1 had overheating problems when standing still, this could easily be fixed by fitting an oil-cooler.

Opel introduced the "C" package. The "C" cars were fitted with extra instruments (oil pressure, voltmeter etc.) and the interior was either red, dark blue, green, or brown.

The A1 also came with a sports package or "S" package. The cars all were marked as "S" models on the front wings, and came with 15-inch Ronal alloy wheels and a 45% limited slip differential

Four well-sized adults had plenty of space. Even the boot was large, and the rear seats flipped down to make even more space. The A1 was not a great hit at the customers even though it was relatively cheap.

With the 3.0-litre engine, the Monza was at that time the fastest car Opel had ever built. Being capable of speeds as high as 215 km/h (134 mph), and a 0–100 km/h (62 mph) acceleration time of 8.2 seconds.

== Monza A2 (1982–1986) ==
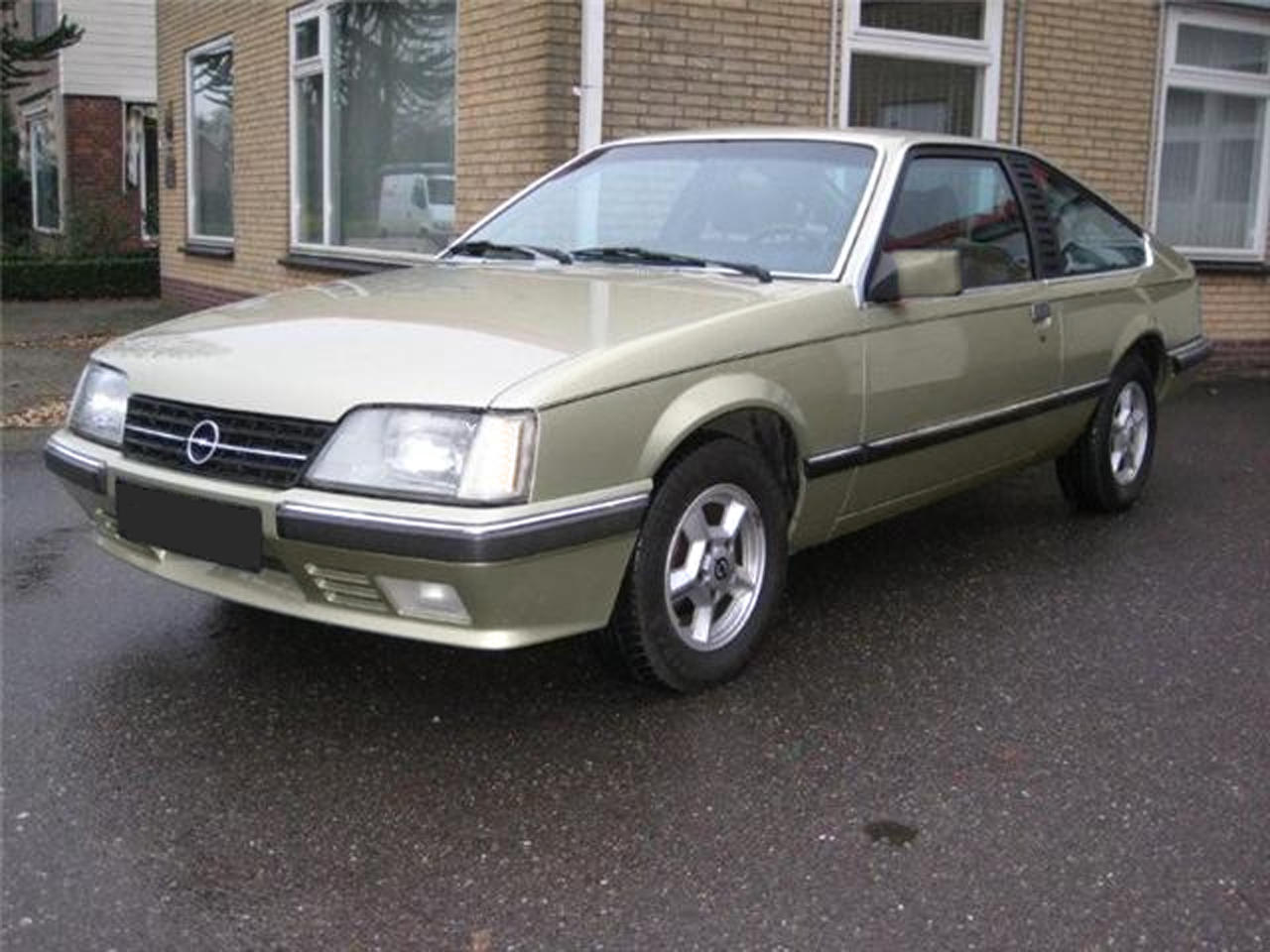
Opel Monza (1982–1986)

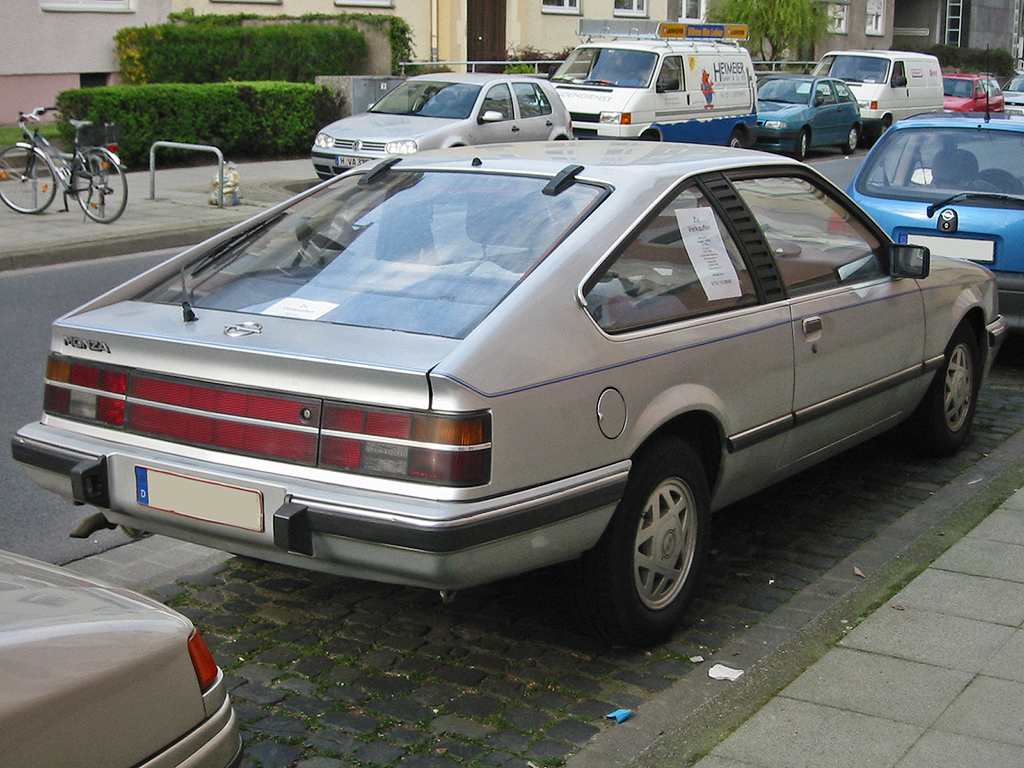
Opel Monza rear (1982–1986)

In 1982, the Monza, Rekord and Senator all got a face-lift and were named the A2 (E2 for the Rekord). The A2 looked similar to the A1 overall but with some small changes to the front end. The headlights noticeably increased in size, and the front was more streamlined than the A1. The car was much more slippery, with drag resistance down by around ten percent (from 0.40 to 0.35 $\scriptstyle C_\mathrm x\,$). Also the chrome parts like bumpers etc. were changed to a matt black finish, or with plastic parts. The bumpers were now made of plastic and gave the Monza the look of a sports car in appearance, and actually did look similar to the Opel Manta, despite the ample size difference. The rear lights were the same and the orange front indicators were now clear glass, giving a much more modern look to the car. Overall the update was regarded as successful although retrospectively some of the purity of the lines of the early car were lost.

At a time of rising fuel prices, the need for fuel efficiency was becoming paramount, and Opel decided to change the engine specifications of the Monza. This meant introducing both the inline four-cylinder CIH 2.0E engine from the Rekord E2 (replaced by the torquier 2.2 in October 1984). However, as the Monza weighs almost 1400 kg, given the 115 PS of the two engines, the cars were considered underpowered and thus unpopular. The 2.5E was given a new Bosch injection system so between 136 and 140 PS was available. The 2.8S was taken out of production. The 3.0E engine stayed the top of the range. The 3.0E was given an upgraded Bosch fuel injection and fuel consumption improved somewhat.

The cars now came with more luxurious interior, electrically controlled side mirrors and even an on-board computer, recording fuel consumption, speed and range.

The launch of the A2 in the UK saw the demise of the Vauxhall Royale Coupe, which had been sold alongside the Monza, resulting in only the Opel model being available on the market. The Royale was disparagingly described by Autocar as "an effeminate, frilly, titivated version of the [Monza] with fussy wheels and an unpleasant (often pastel-shaded) velour-smothered interior".

=== Monza GSE ===
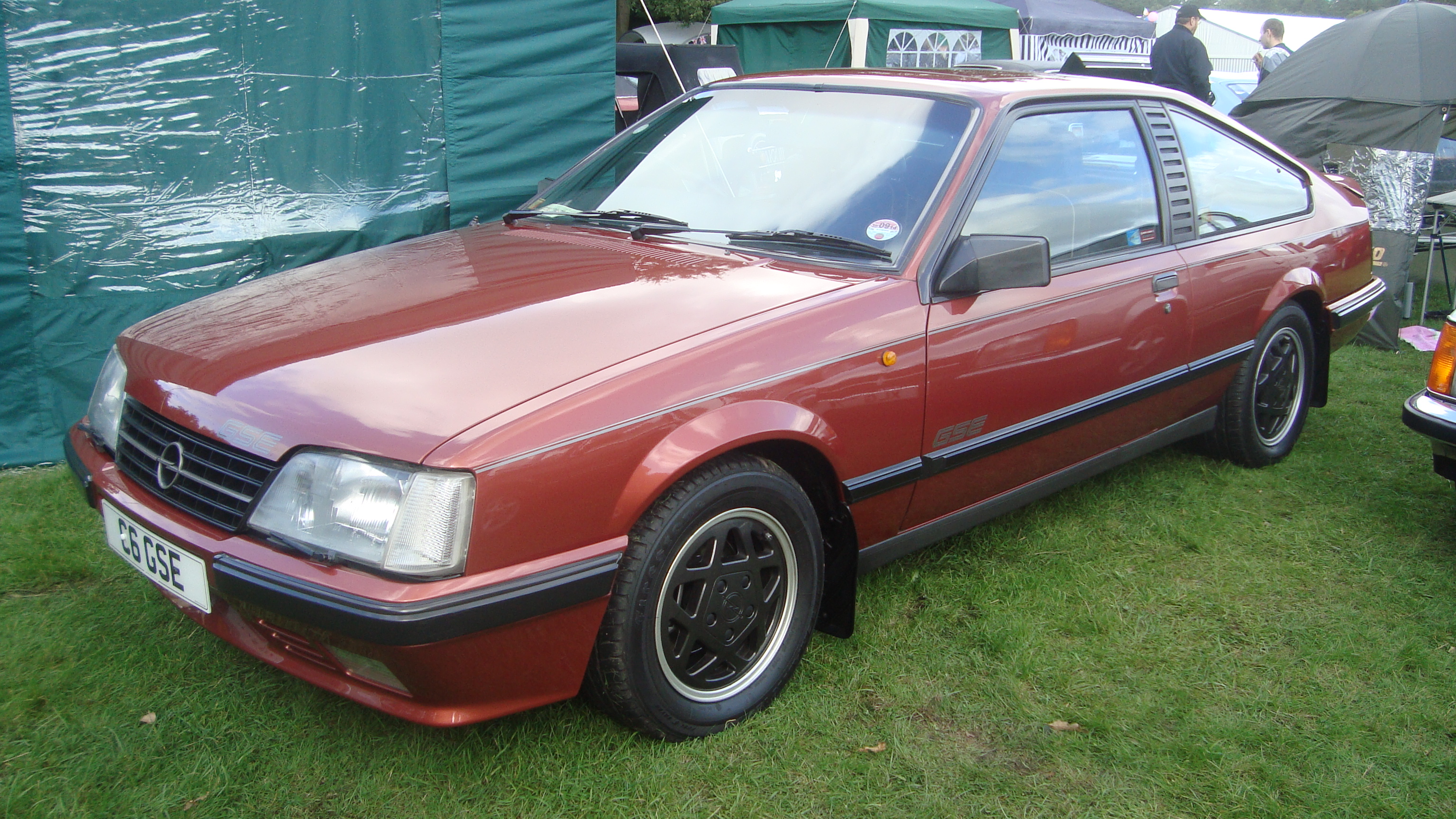
Opel Monza GSE (1983–1986)

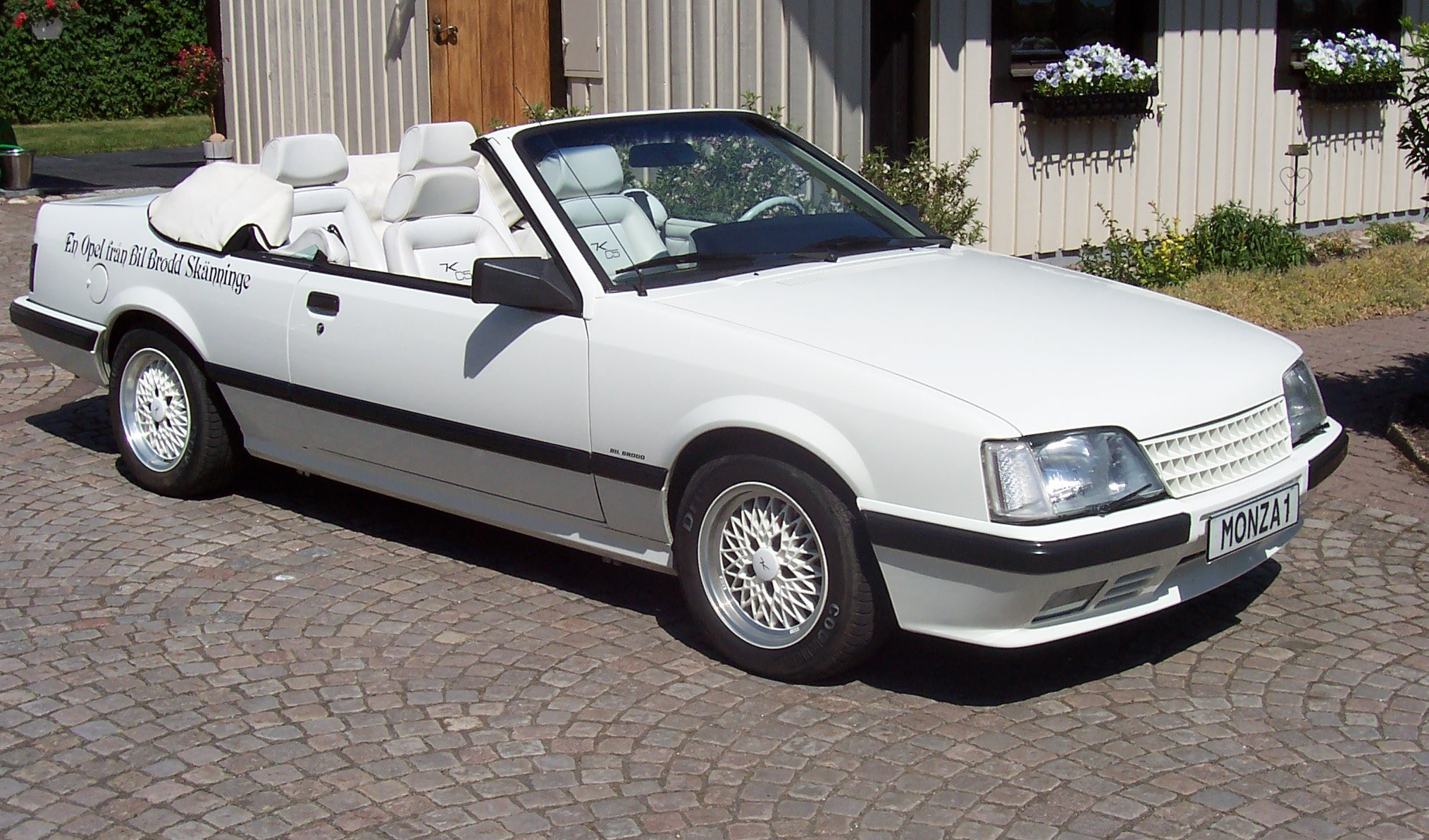
Opel Monza convertible: Keinath C5

The last incarnation of the Monza was the GSE edition in mid-1983; basically the A2 car, but a high-specification model which had Recaro sports seats, digital LCD instruments, firmer suspension, the Getrag five-speed manual transmission, an enhanced all-black interior, and a small boot spoiler. Also GSE models are equipped with a 40% limited slip differential, an addition that had to be ordered separately on earlier 3.0E cars when purchasing.

By the time the Senator was updated to the new Senator B and the Monza cancelled, 43,812 Monzas had been built. There was no direct Monza replacement, although the idea of a large Opel/Vauxhall sporting car was carried on in the Lotus Carlton/Lotus Omega saloon. Bitter Cars put a 4.0 engine under the hood as a prototype. Three were built; two left hand drive and one right hand drive, one left hand drive burned out on a motorway in Germany and the other is in a museum, but the right hand drive one is in Somerset, UK.

== Holden Monza ==
In Australia, local racing legend Peter Brock had plans to import, modify and market the Opel Monza Coupé as the Holden Monza with the Holden 5 Litre V8 fitted, through his own HDT (Holden Dealer Team) business, but the plans eventually fell through. This was due to the expense of adapting the car to Australian Design Rules. One model was built with modifications, including a 5.0-litre Holden V8 engine.

== Other uses of the Monza name ==
In South Africa, a saloon version of the smaller Opel Kadett E was also sold as the Opel Monza. In Brazil and Venezuela, a version of the Opel Ascona C was sold as the Chevrolet Monza, which featured a three-door fastback body unique to Latin America. There was also an unrelated Chevrolet Monza in the United States.

Since 2019, Chinese buyers have been offered another Chevrolet Monza, this time a four-door sedan.

== 2013 Monza Concept ==
2013 Monza Concept
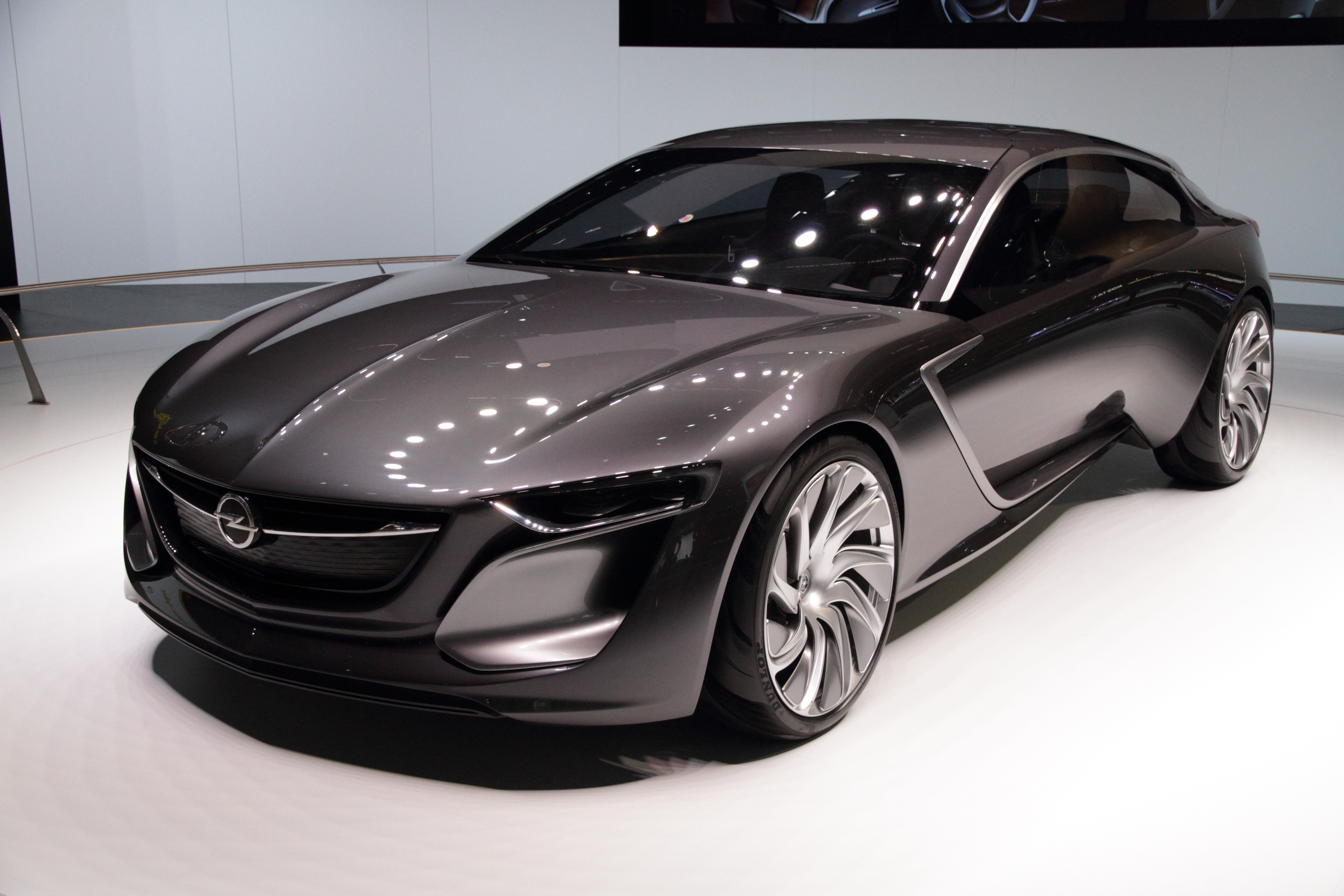

Overview
- Manufacturer: Opel
- Also called: Vauxhall Monza (United Kingdom)
- Production: 2013 (Concept car)
- Designer: Friedheim Engler under Mark Adams

Body and chassis
- Class: Executive car (E)
- Body style: 3-door 2+2 fastback coupé
- Doors: Gullwing doors
- Related: Opel Flextreme GT/E

Powertrain
- Engine: 1.0 L B10XFL SIDI turbo I3 (CNG); 1.4 L Voltec I4 (Petrol)
- Transmission: 1-speed Voltec 4ET50 Multi-mode electric transaxle
- Hybrid drivetrain: Series hybrid/Parallel hybrid (GM Voltec)
- Battery: Li-ion

The Opel Monza Concept is a three-door 2+2 fastback coupé plug-in hybrid concept car with 2 gullwing doors for easy access to the rear seats unveiled at the Frankfurt Motor Show in September 2013. The concept was also shown under the British Vauxhall marque.

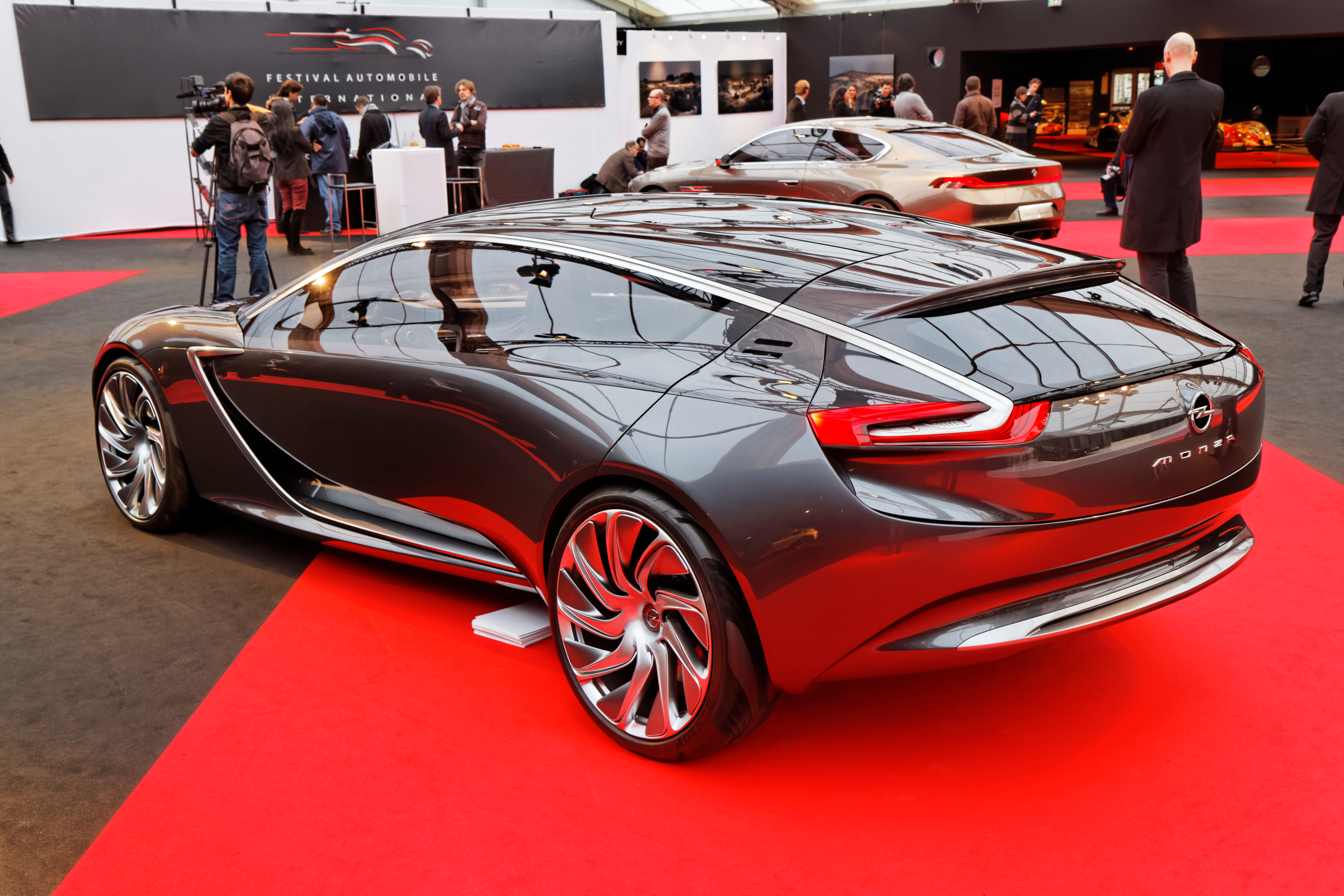
Rear view

The concept shares the same basic plug-in hybrid setup as the Chevrolet Volt and Opel Ampera called "VOLTEC", but using a turbocharged 1-liter 3-cylinder natural gas-powered engine as its range extender instead of General Motors’ current 1.4-liter gasoline Voltec engine. The Monza Concept is the first car to feature cutting-edge LED projection infotainment.

Dr. Karl-Thomas Neumann, the CEO of Opel, has been quoted as saying "The Monza Concept is nothing less than our vision of the automotive future". According to Opel, this concept is the role-model for the next generation of Opel cars, and because of its modular chassis design, future cars based on it would be able to accommodate gasoline, diesel or electric power.

Chief designer Ed Welburn of General Motors said "The gullwing doors will go into production and concept".
