= Opel Senator =

Executive car produced by the German automaker Opel

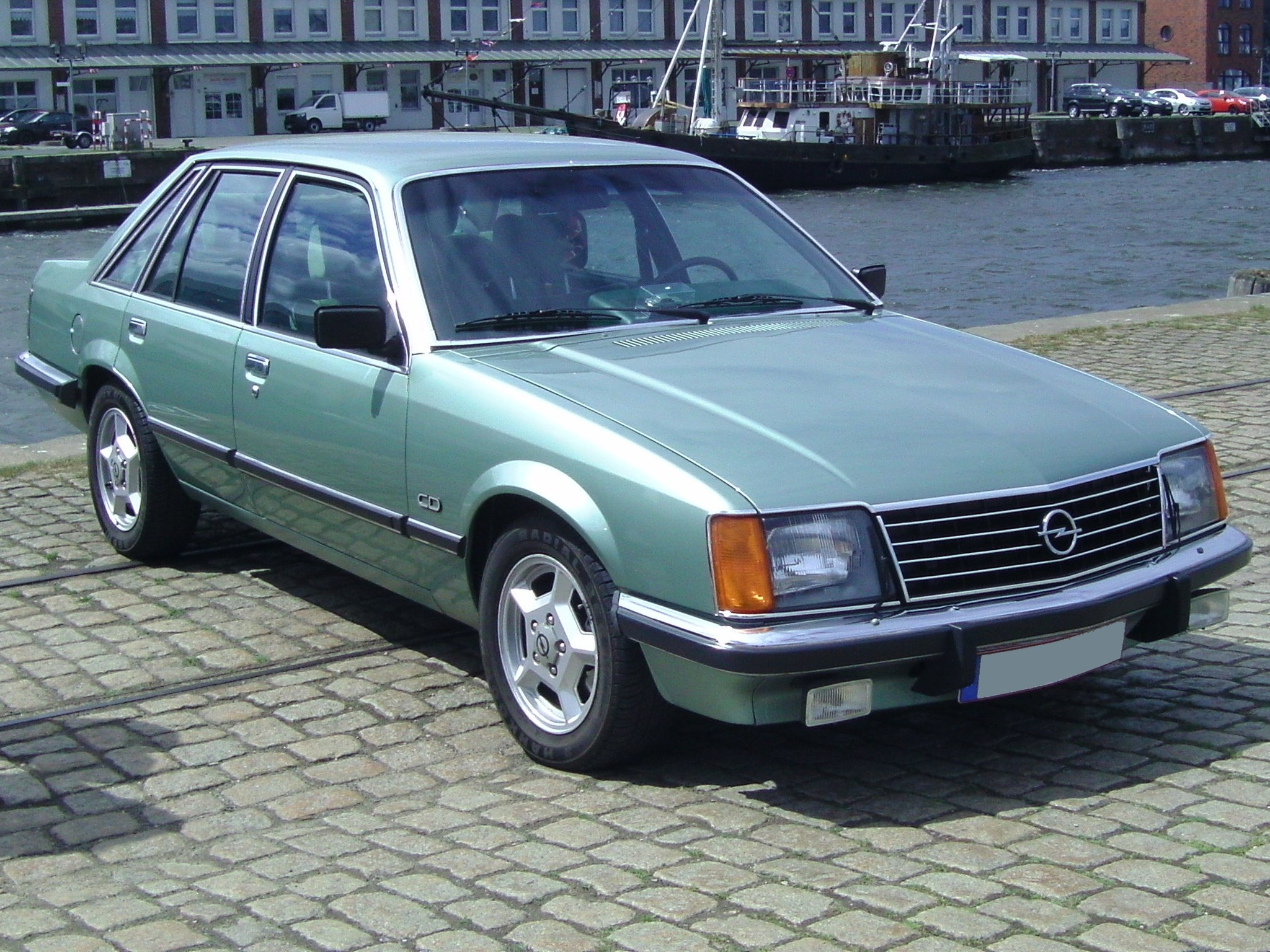
- A first generation Opel Senator

Overview
- Manufacturer: Opel (General Motors)
- Production: 1978–1993

Body and chassis
- Class: Executive car (E-segment)

Chronology
- Predecessor: Opel Kapitän/Admiral/Diplomat; Vauxhall Ventora
- Successor: Opel Omega B

The Opel Senator is a full-size executive car (E-segment) produced by the German automaker Opel, two generations of which were sold in Europe from 1978 until 1993. A saloon, its first incarnation was also available with a fastback coupé body as the Opel Monza and Vauxhall Royale Coupé. The Senator was, for its entire existence, the flagship saloon model for both Opel and Vauxhall.

Through the international divisions of General Motors, it was also known in various markets as the Chevrolet Senator, Daewoo Imperial (in South Korea), Vauxhall Royale (until 1983), and the Vauxhall Senator (which took the place of the Royale on Vauxhall models when the Opel brand was phased out from 1983). It was also sold as the Opel Kikinda in Yugoslavia, where it was produced under licence by IDA-Opel in Kikinda, Serbia, after which it was named.

The original Senator was a de facto replacement for Opel's KAD cars (the Opel Kapitän, Admiral and Diplomat), which competed in the F-segment (full-size luxury) in which the KAD cars had sold poorly. Sister company Vauxhall had already abandoned the segment with the demise of its Cresta/Viscount models some years earlier, leaving the Ventora model (a luxury derivative of the FE Victor/VX4) as its flagship offering, but this was axed in 1976 with no direct replacement.

The Senator shared its platform with the smaller Opel Rekord, the latter being lengthened to make the Senator. The second generation of that car, from 1987, shared its base with the Rekord's Opel Omega successor, which was again lengthened to produce the Senator.

== Senator A (1978–1986) ==
Senator A
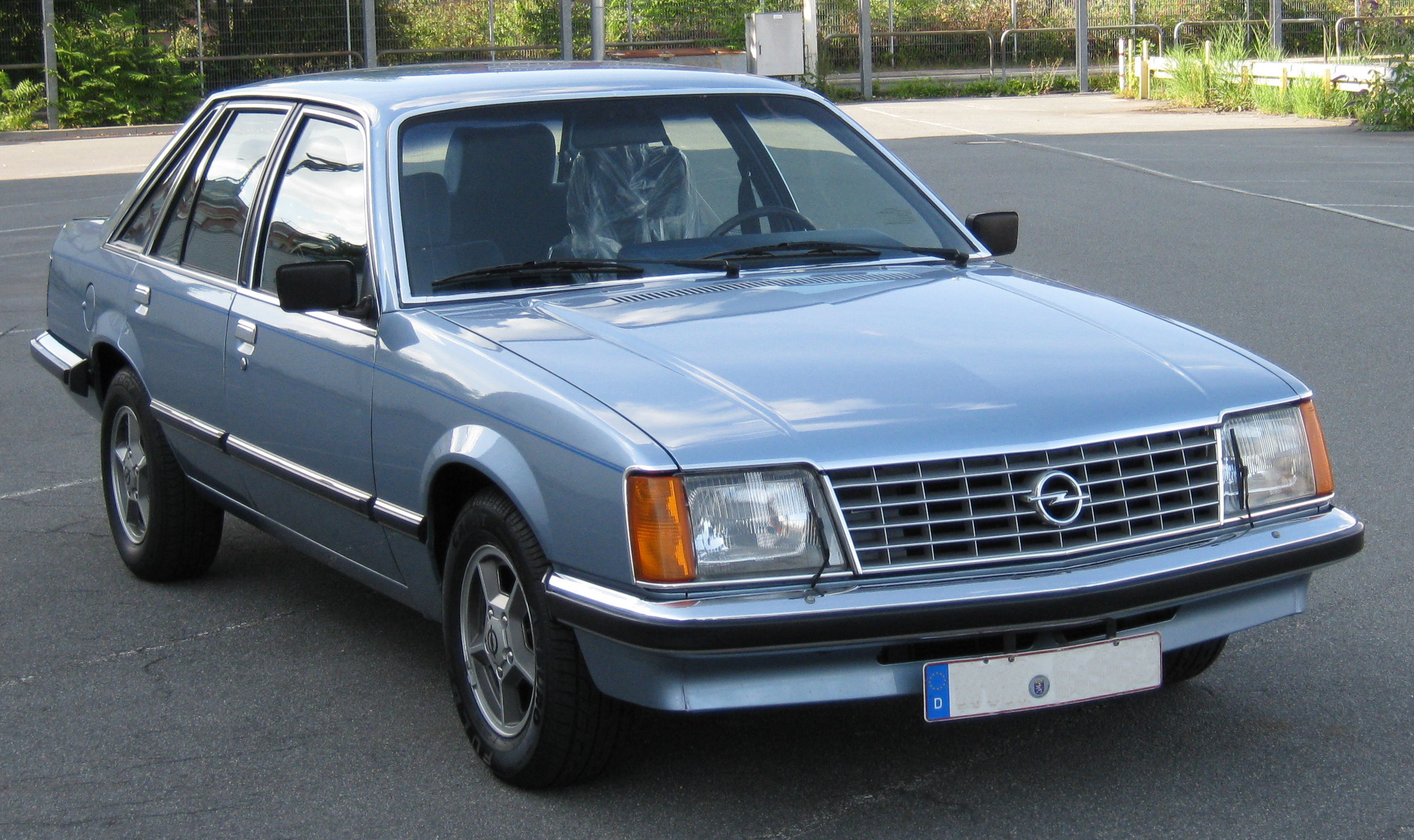

Overview
- Also called: Chevrolet Senator (South Africa); Opel Kikinda (Yugoslavia); Vauxhall Royale (UK, until 1983); Vauxhall Senator (UK, from 1984)
- Production: 1978–1986
- Assembly: Germany: Rüsselsheim; Yugoslavia: Kikinda

Body and chassis
- Class: Executive car (E-segment)
- Body style: 4-door saloon/sedan
- Layout: FR layout
- Platform: V platform (RWD)
- Related: Opel Monza; Opel Rekord Series E; Daewoo Royale Salon Super; Bitter SC Coupé; Holden Commodore (VB)

Powertrain
- Engine: petrol: 1979 cc 20E I4; 2197 cc 22E I4; 2490 cc 25E I6; 2784 cc 28S I6; 2969 cc 30S/30E I6; 4093 cc Chevrolet 250 I6 (ZA); diesel: 2260 cc 23DT turbo I4; 2260 cc 23DK Comprex I4

Dimensions
- Wheelbase: 2,685 mm (105.7 in)
- Length: 4,810 mm (189.4 in)
- Width: 1,722 mm (67.8 in)
- Height: 1,415 mm (55.7 in)
- Curb weight: 1,335–1,450 kg (2,943–3,197 lb)

The Senator A was the last part of a joint model programme executed by GM in the 1970s to develop a common series of vehicle platforms for both its European brands (and also for the Holden brand in Australia). The first two product families of this strategy – the T-Car (Kadett C/Chevette) and the U-Car (Ascona B/Manta B/Cavalier) had already been released. The V-Car (or V78) platform would simultaneously provide the next-generation Opel Rekord, a replacement for the Vauxhall FE Victor, and a 'stretch' version to replace the unsuccessful 'KAD' cars, and act as a flagship for both Opel and Vauxhall.

The Senator, therefore, emerged as a long wheelbase version of the Opel Rekord E, complemented by a three-door fastback coupé version on the same platform called the Opel Monza, which was intended as a successor for the Opel Commodore coupé.

=== Names and markets ===
The Senator A and Monza were initially sold in the United Kingdom as the Vauxhall Royale (and Vauxhall Royale Coupé). Unlike other members of the joint Opel/Vauxhall model programme of the period, the Royale was simply a badge engineered version of the Senator with only detail differences from its Opel sister.

Following the merger of the UK Opel and Vauxhall dealer networks in 1982, the Opel marque was repositioned as a performance-luxury brand, and the Vauxhall Royale models were dropped in favour of the Opel Senator/Monza, coinciding with the "A2" mid-cycle facelift. This policy was reversed in late 1984, with the Senator reverting to Vauxhall branding for the 1985 model year, but the Monza remained on sale as an Opel until its discontinuation at the end of 1987.

The vehicle was also available in South Africa as the Chevrolet Senator until 1982, when it was rebadged as an Opel. It filled the gap left by the Holden-based Chevrolet Constantia and Chevrolet Caprice Classic, which were sold there from 1975 to 1978. The Chevrolet Senator was fitted with a locally built version of Chevrolet's 250 inline-six (4,093 cc), with 132 PS (97 kW). The post-1982 South African Opel Senator received Australian-built, six-cylinder engines. In Serbia, the locally assembled Senator received the 2.5-litre six and was badged the "Opel Kikinda".

The Senator and Rekord E were used as the base vehicle from which the Holden Commodore was developed for the Australian and New Zealand markets. The later VK Commodore was a hybrid between the two Opel cars, featuring the Senator's six-light glasshouse grafted onto the Rekord E derived shell. The Daewoo Royale did the reverse, utilizing the Opel Rekord E2 glasshouse combined with the Senator front, except for the Daewoo Royale Salon Super, which used the Senator bodyshell in its entirety (albeit with different taillights). Later models were heavily facelifted, modernizing their appearance and masking their Senator origins.

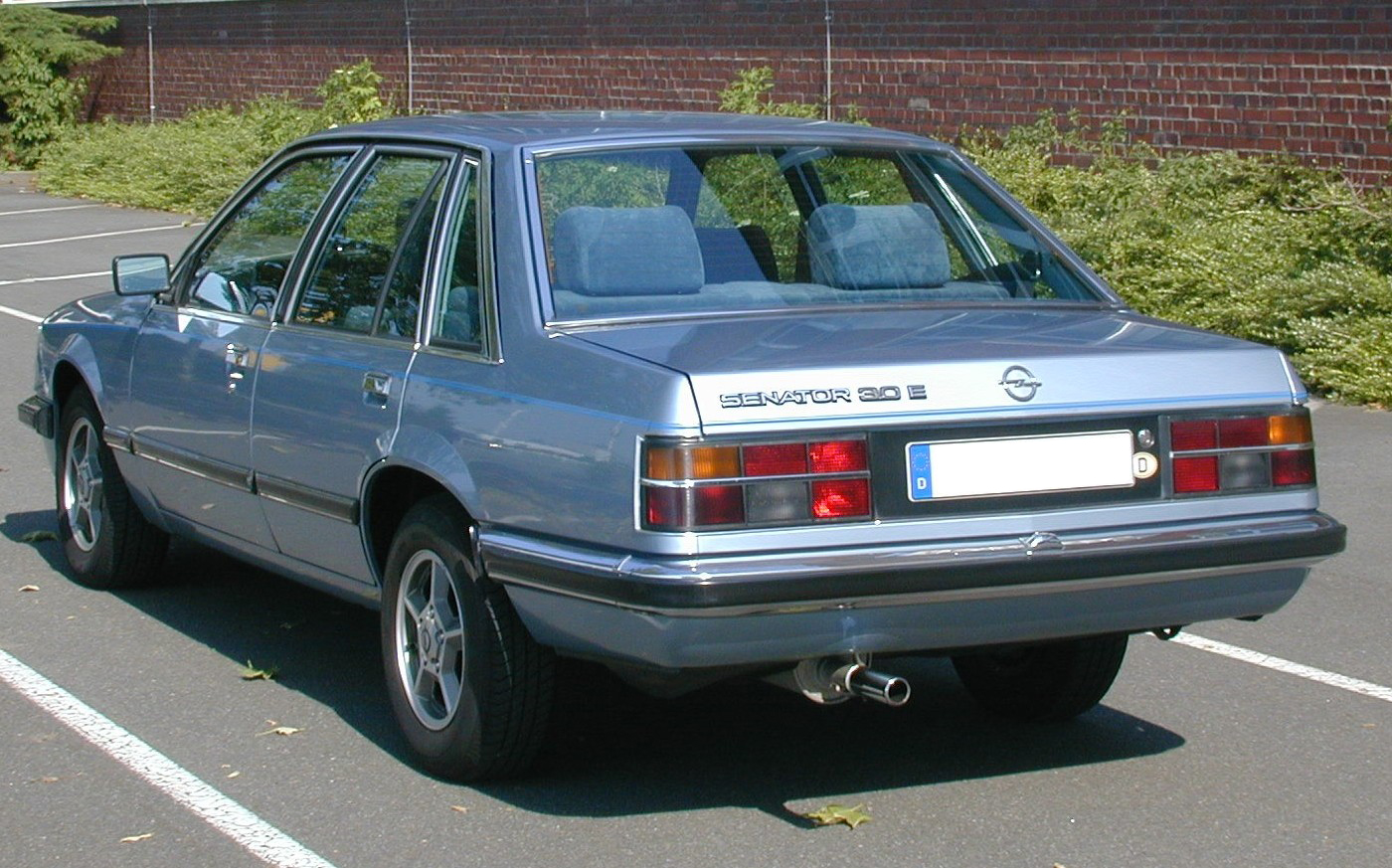
Opel Senator A1 rear
(1978–1982)

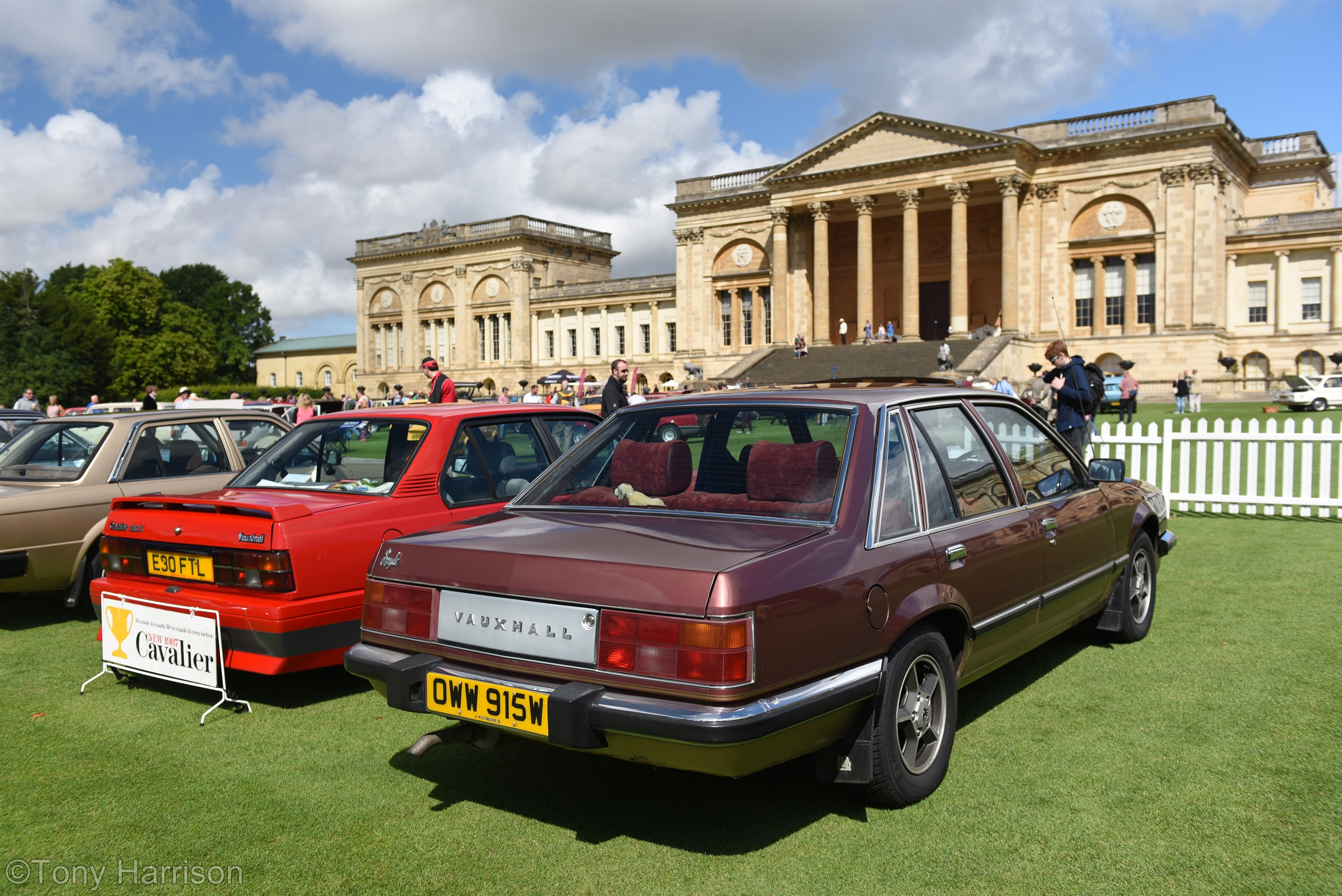
Vauxhall Royale saloon

=== Engines ===
The engine range for the first phase of the model's life included the 2.8S and the newly developed 3.0E, which had 180 PS (132 kW; 178 hp) and 248 N⋅m (183 lb⋅ft) with fuel injection. The three-speed automatic transmission was Opel's own design introduced in 1969, and was manufactured in Opel's transmission plant in Strasbourg, it was modified to cope with the new and improved power outputs.

Opel's own four speed manual transmission was not up to the job and they turned to transmission producer Getrag, who installed their 264 four speed manual gearbox in the early four cylinder Monzas. This was replaced by the five speed 240 for the 2.5 and 2.8 engines, and the 265 gearbox for the 3.0E.

The straight-six engines were all of the Opel cam-in-head engine design, as used in the earlier Commodore models and originating from the 1.7 and 1.9-litre straight four engines first used in the 1966 Kadett and Rekord. Opel would stick with the CIH engine design up until the 2.4 Frontera in 1993.

With the 3.0 litre engine, the Monza was the fastest car Opel had built, capable of 215 km/h (134 mph), and 0–100 km/h (0–62 mph) in 8.5 seconds. In June 1981, the fuel injected 2.5E engine also used in the smaller Commodore was added to the Senator/Monza lineup. With 136 PS (100 kW) it was very close to the now irrelevant 2.8 and its 140 PS (103 kW), and the 2.8S was discontinued in 1982.

=== Facelift (A2) ===
The original Senator and Monza were facelifted in November 1982, although the Senator "A2" (as it is usually called) only went on sale in March 1983. In the United Kingdom, it was initially sold only as an Opel, before being rebadged as a Vauxhall in 1984. The A2 Monza was only sold as an Opel.

The facelifted car looked similar to its predecessor, with relatively minor changes: smoothed-off headlights increased in size, and chrome parts were changed to a matt black or colour coded finish. The car was much more slippery, with drag resistance down (from 0.45 to 0.36 $\scriptstyle C_\mathrm x\,$). The top of the range 3.0E received upgraded Bosch LE-Jetronic fuel injection.

Interiors were improved with an altered dashboard and the new instrument pack with larger dials used in the Rekord E2, and engines changed. Now, the fuel-injected straight-four 110 PS (81 kW) two-liter cam-in-head unit from the Rekord E2 was available, although with little fanfare; this and the 2.5 essentially replaced the Commodore which was itself quietly retired in 1982. Power of the 2.0 was soon increased to 115 PS (85 kW). In March 1983 a 2.3-litre turbodiesel (shared with the Rekord) became available, and a few months later ABS-brakes (hitherto only available for the Senator CD) became an available option across the entire Senator/Monza range. At the Paris Show in September 1984 the 2.5E was given a new LE-Jetronic Bosch fuel injection system; power inched up to 140 PS (103 kW). The 2.0E was replaced by the torquier 2.2E, still with the same max power. Only the 3.0E engine remained untouched, although its name was changed to 3.0i. On the transmission side, the Strasbourg-built THM180 three-speed automatic was replaced by a four-speed unit. For the 1985 model year, the digital instrument display introduced in the Kadett E was available on the top models, although buyers could opt for the conventional analogue dials as a delete option. The trim surrounding the windows was more blacked out than before as well, although ample chrome remained. the four-cylinder models were never sold in Vauxhall form in the United Kingdom.

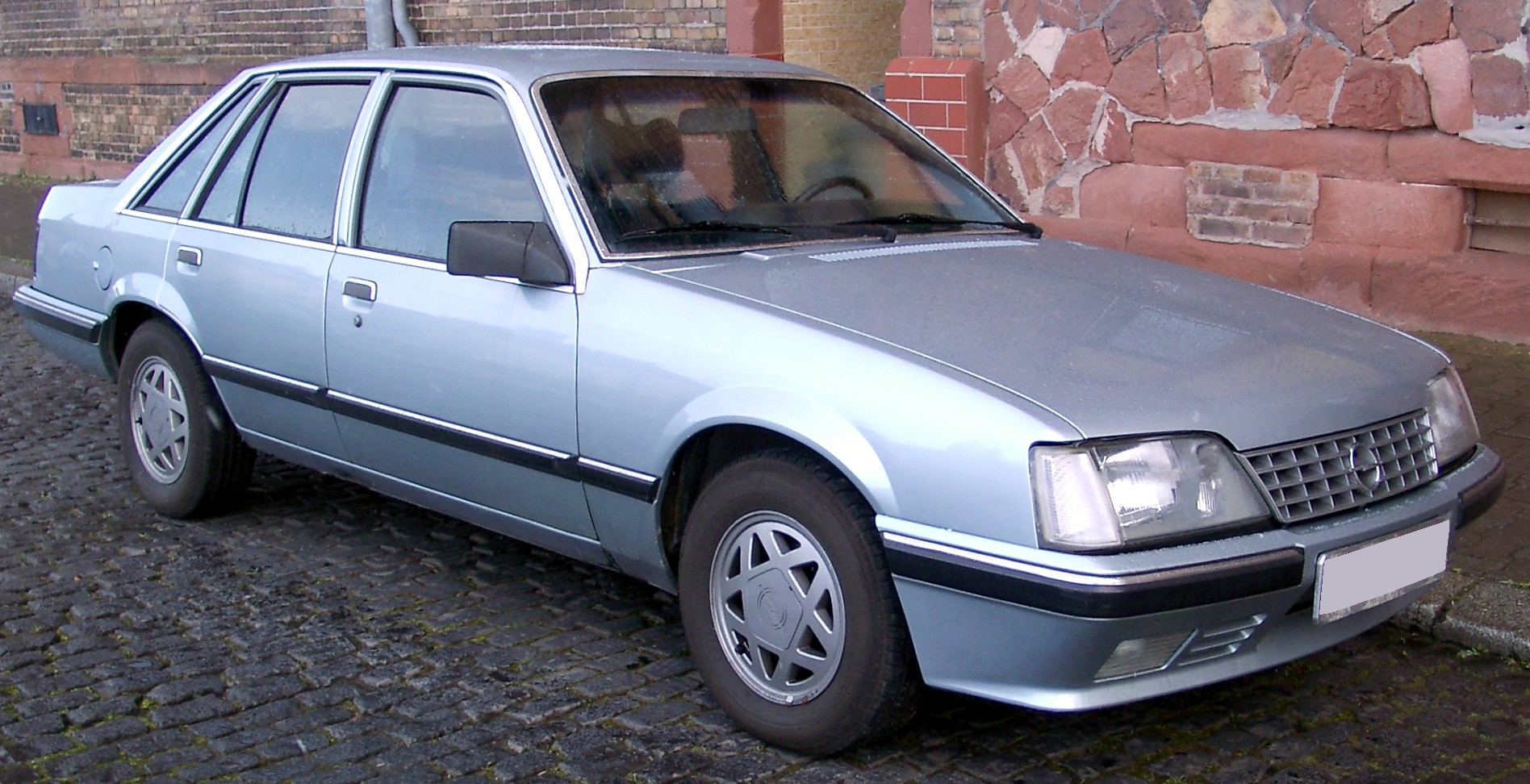
Opel Senator A2 (1982–1986)

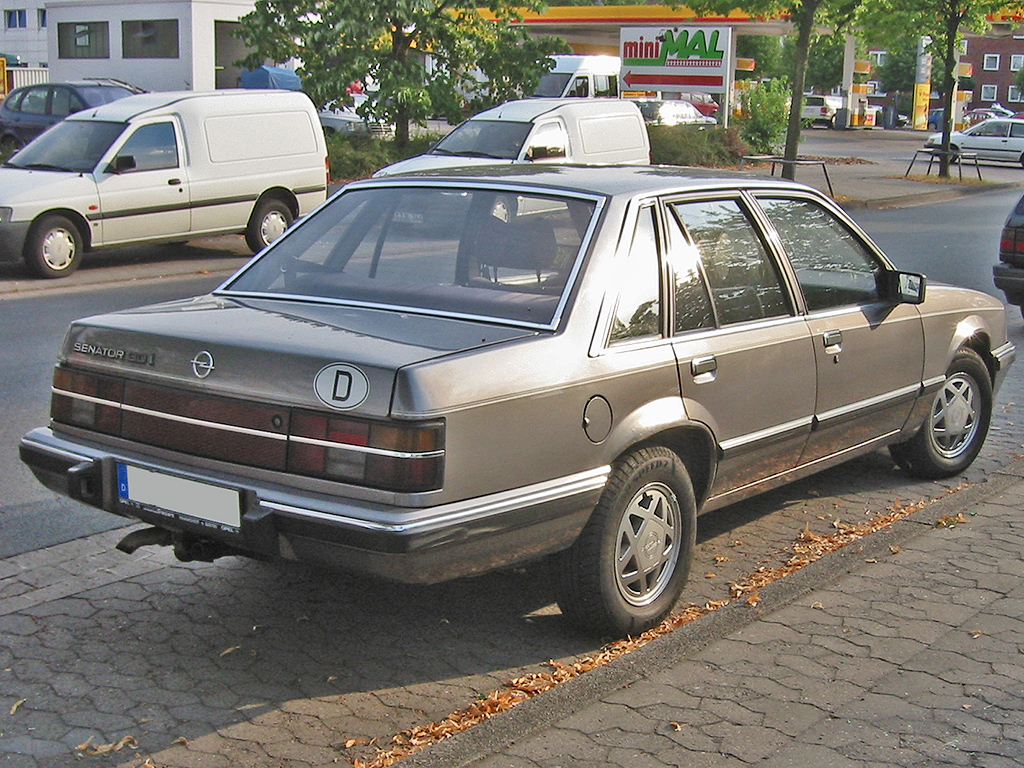
Opel Senator A2 (rear)

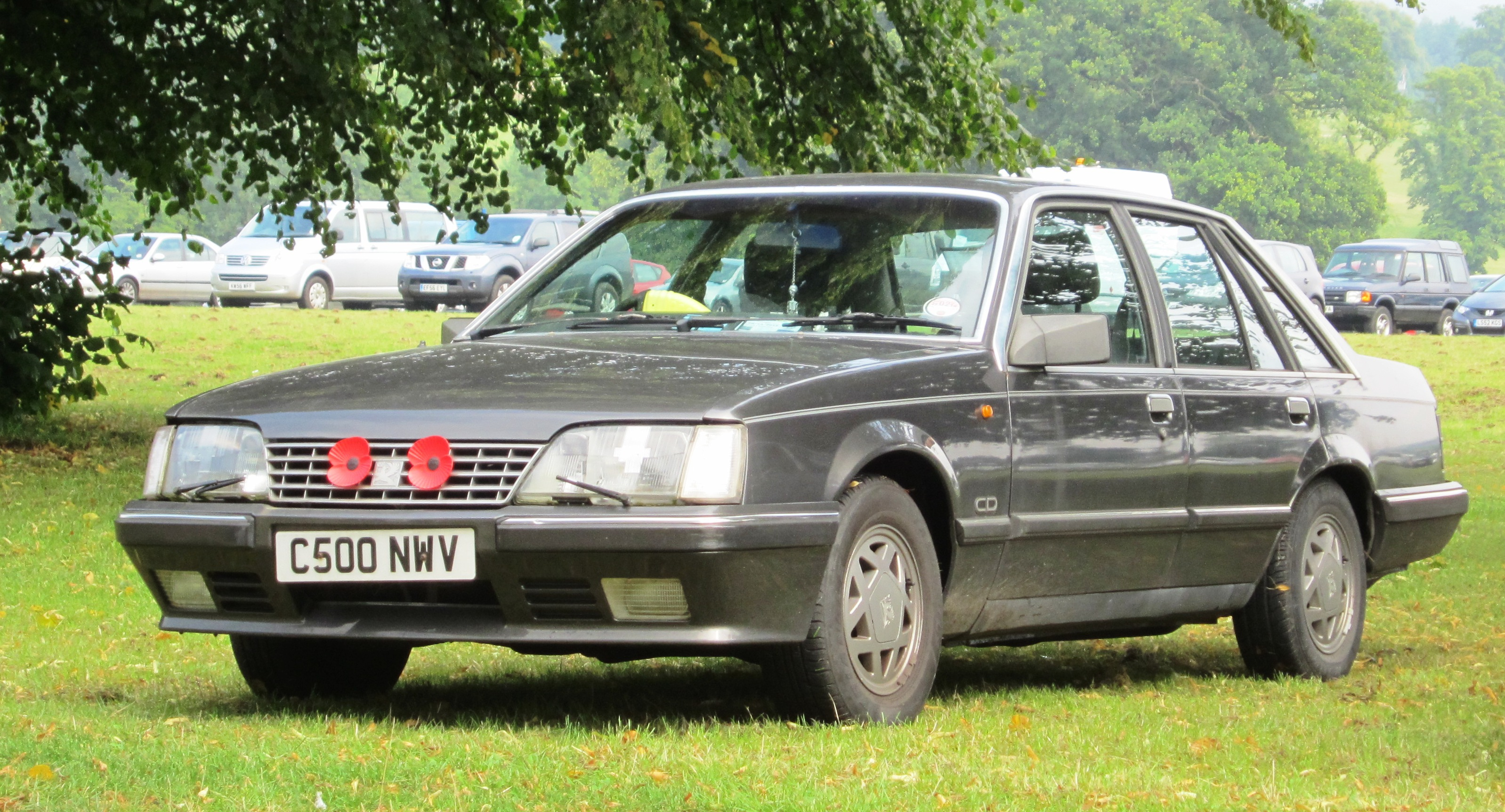
Vauxhall Senator (A2)

Shortly thereafter, in November 1984, a supercharged diesel version (Comprex) was shown – at the time, the only production car in the world to use this technique. Going on sale in 1985, this rare experimental version (1,000 units planned) was officially built by Irmscher rather than Opel. The Comprex offered 95 PS (70 kW) and a 172 km/h (107 mph) top speed, and acceleration figures showed a twelve percent improvement over the turbodiesel. Like the other Rekord and Senator diesels, it had a pronounced bulge in the bonnet. The Comprex offered marginally higher power than the turbodiesel, but more importantly, 90 percent of the maximum torque was available from 1300 rpm. From September 1985 until the end of production in the end of summer 1986, a catalyzed version of the 3.0E was available, with power down to 156 PS (115 kW).

=== Variants ===
A four-wheel drive conversion was also available, engineered by Ferguson, who had previously provided similar modifications for the Jensen FF. Rather expensive, this could also be retrofitted to an existing car. The system uses a viscous coupling to distribute power with a 60/40 rearward bias, to improve traction while maintaining the Senator's handling characteristics. These were used by British Forces Germany under the BRIXMIS (British Commanders' in Chief Mission to the Soviet Forces in Germany) operations for the collection of technical intelligence. The same kit was also used by Bitter Cars for a four-wheel-drive version of their SC coupé, beginning in the end of 1981.

A limited edition convertible version was also available in Germany, built by the company Keinath, who reinforced the car heavily, adding to the overall weight of the car.

== Senator B (1987–1993) ==
Senator B
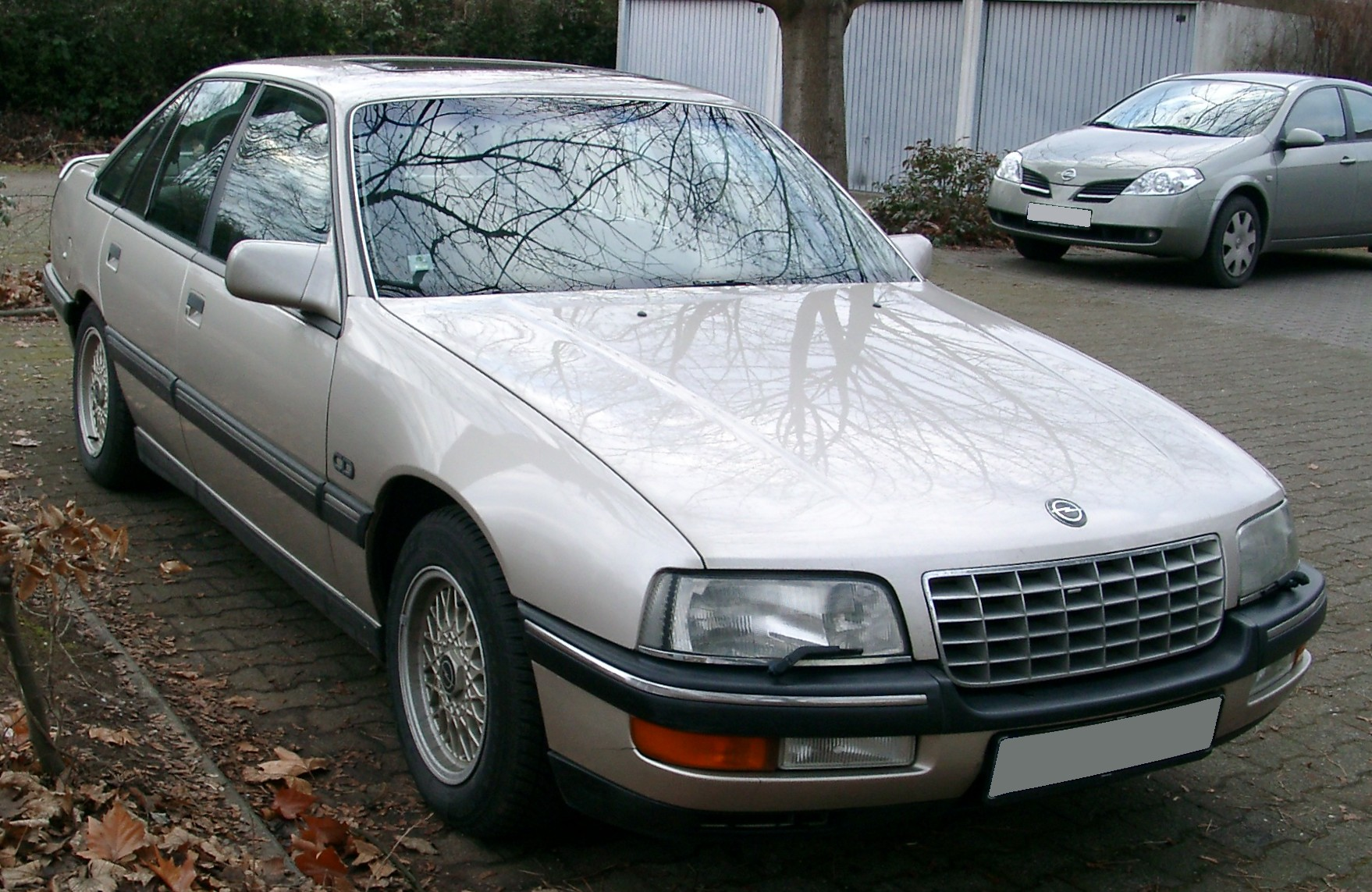

Overview
- Also called: Vauxhall Senator
- Production: 1987–1993
- Assembly: Germany: Rüsselsheim

Body and chassis
- Class: Executive car (E-segment)
- Body style: 4-door saloon/sedan
- Layout: FR layout
- Platform: V platform (RWD)
- Related: Holden Commodore (VN)

Powertrain
- Engine: 2.5 L 25NE I6; 2.6 L C26NE I6; 3.0 L C30NE I6; 3.0 L C30SE 24V I6; 4.0 L Irmscher C40SE 24V I6
- Transmission: 4-speed automatic 5-speed manual

Dimensions
- Wheelbase: 2,730 mm (107.5 in)
- Length: 4,845 mm (190.7 in)
- Width: 1,785 mm (70.3 in)
- Height: 1,455 mm (57.3 in)
- Curb weight: 1,450–1,650 kg (3,197–3,638 lb)

A new model, the Senator B (marketed without the "B" suffix), arrived in the spring of 1987, a longer-bodied version of the Opel Omega. There was no Monza equivalent.

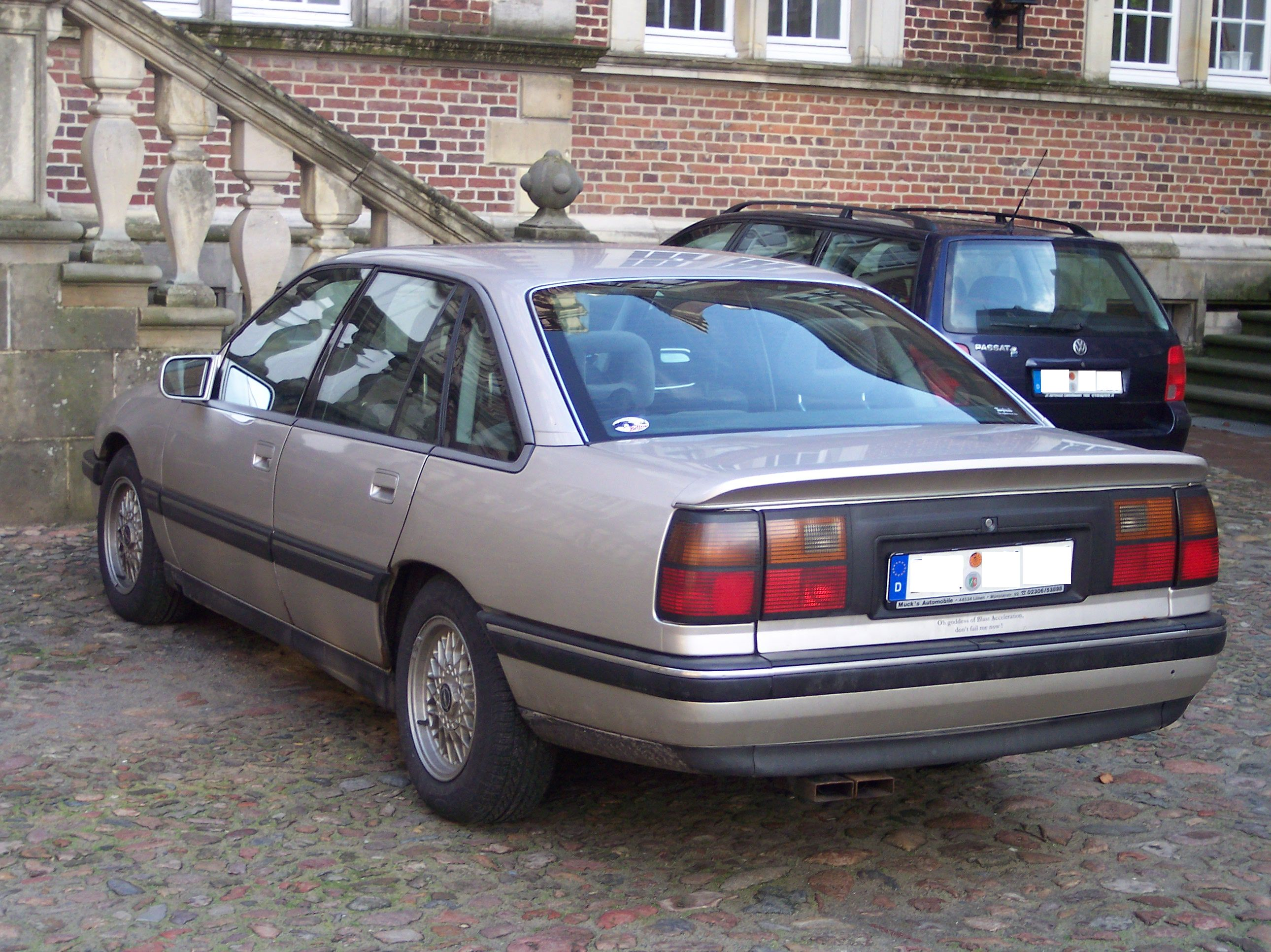
Opel Senator B rear

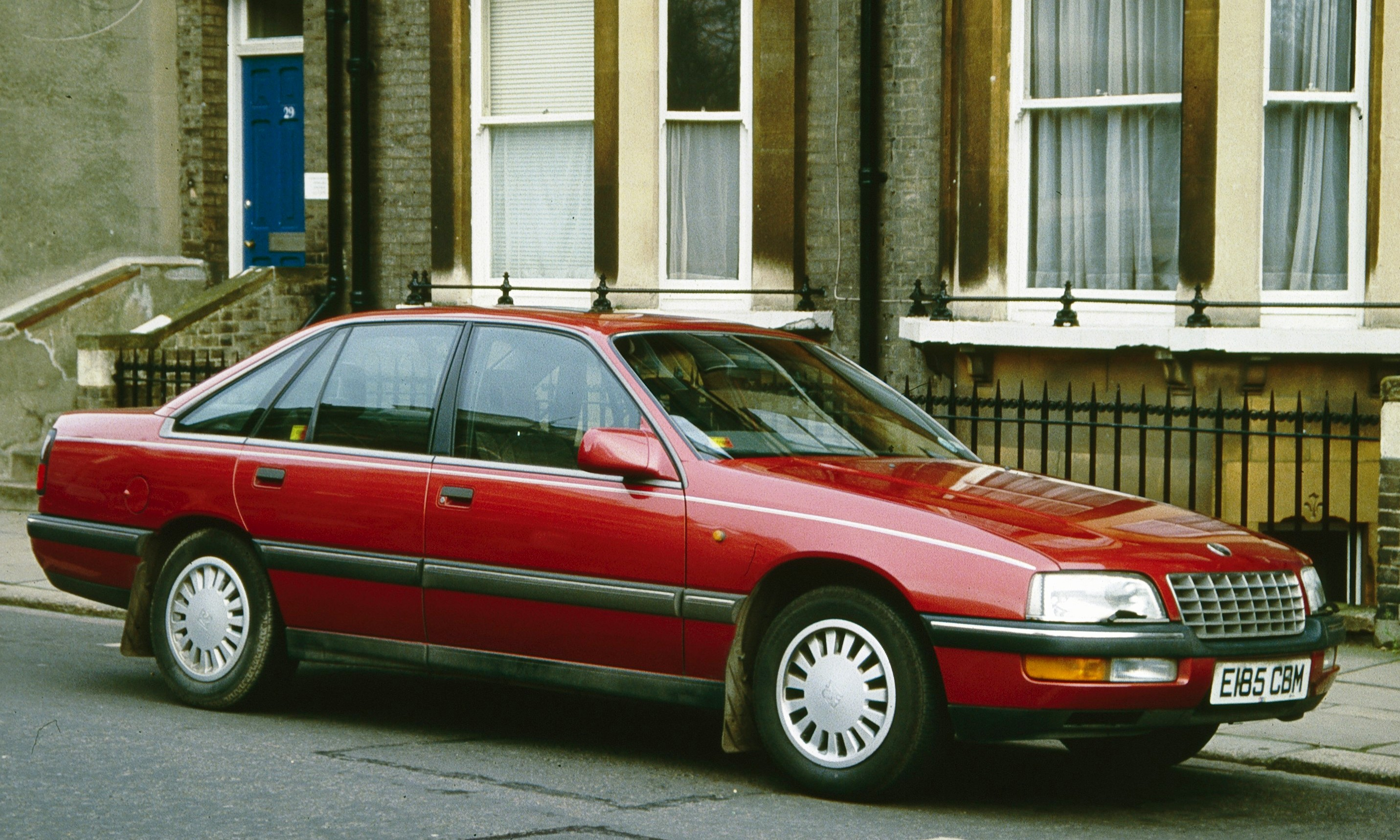
Vauxhall Senator B

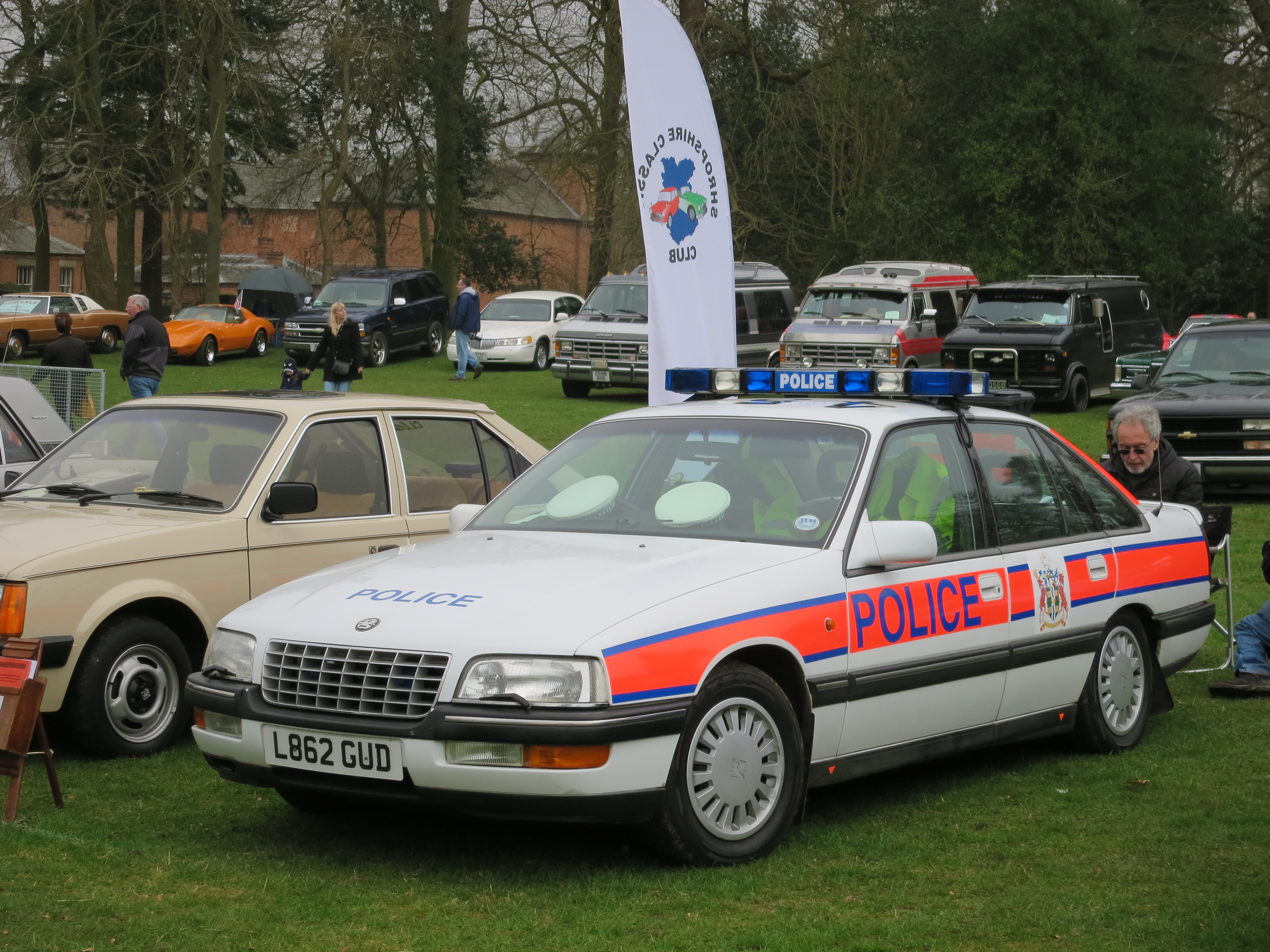
A Thames Valley Police Vauxhall Senator B

There were various versions of the Senator B: twelve valve 2.5 L and 3.0 L sized engines were released in 1987 along with a luxury "CD" model with the 3.0 L engine. The CD version boasted Electronic adjustable suspension, "ERC", for the first time in a mass-produced European car, air conditioning, heated seats also in the back, genuine walnut panels, leather covered centre console, trip computer and cruise control.

The cars were available with either five speed manual or four speed automatic gearboxes. A digitally controlled 4-speed automatic from Aisin-Warner equipped with three different switching programs Sport, Economy and Winter. It was also equipped with torque delay at each shift, called "torque retard", for not notable gear changes. In winter mode the car starts on the third gear and switches immediately to fourth as soon as possible to prevent spinning wheels and instability. This mode remains to the speed of 80 km/h and then automatically switches off. The gearbox also had built-in diagnostic system and emergency program. Later Lexus and Volvo used similar versions of this transmission. As a luxury car, there were many options, but much was also standard. Options included leather seats, heated seats both front and rear, and electronic air conditioning including refrigerator in the glove box.

LCD instrumentation was also an option. Digital electronic power steering ZF-Servotronic, the same as in the BMW 7 Series, was standard, as was a new front axle design which allowed the axle to slide under the car in a crash and thus increasing the length of the deformation zone and prevent deformation of the footwell. The 3.0 24V was equipped with BBS styled multispoke alloy wheels made by Ronal.

A 24-valve version of the 3.0-litre six was introduced in 1989, generating 204 PS (150 kW; 201 hp) – compared with 177 PS (130 kW; 175 hp) for the older twelve valve version. This model was very popular with police forces in the United Kingdom, with several cars being supplied to multiple forces with upgraded police specification for traffic policing service, with the notable exception of the Metropolitan Police. The main feature of the new engine was a "Dual Ram" system, increasing torque at low engine speeds by means of a redirected air flow system which engages at 4,000 rpm. The engine in police service was capable of a speed of up to 140 mph (230 km/h), although the bonnet was prone to rippling at such high speeds.

Opel tuners Irmscher introduced a 4-litre version of the Senator and it went on sale in Germany only in late 1990. Power increased to 272 PS (200 kW), it was equipped with a body kit and alloy wheels, while the car's interior benefitted from buffalo hide, added wood panels, and lots of power equipment. For 1990 the 2.5 L was replaced by a 2.6 L Dual Ram. The twelve-valve, 3-litre version was deleted from the range in 1992. CD versions of the 2.6 L (UK market only), and a 24 valve 3.0 L were available up to the model's withdrawal in 1993.

With the second generation Omega presented at the end of 1993 and available for sale from March 1994, Opel considered themselves sufficiently represented in the upper end of the market by the top specification Omega B. Production of the Opel Senator B ended in the autumn of 1993 with only 69,943 cars produced since the car's launch six and a half years earlier. Annual production had slumped from 14,007 in 1990 to 5,952 in 1992, with only 2,688 cars produced in 1993. Following the announcement of the discontinuation of the Senator, the government of the United Kingdom would order a final batch of around 200 Vauxhall Senators in 1993 for diplomatic and policing use prior to moving over to the Vauxhall Omega, and on some police forces they entered service a year or more later with M plate registrations.

Technical data of Opel Senator B (1987–1993)
Opel Senator	2.5 i 25NE	2.6 i C26NE	3.0 i C30NE	3.0 i C30SE	Irmscher 4.0 i C40SE
Engine:	Inline-six, SOHC, 12V			Inline-six, DOHC, 24V	
Displacement:	2490 cc	2594 cc	2969 cc		3983 cc
bore x Stroke:	87 x 69.8 mm	88.8 x 69.8 mm	95 x 69.8 mm		98 x 88 mm
Max power/rpm:	140 PS (103 kW) at 5200	150 PS (110 kW) at 5600	156 PS (115 kW) at 5400; 177 PS (130 kW) at 5800	204 PS (150 kW) at 6000	272 PS (200 kW) at 5800
Max torque/rpm:	201 N⋅m (148 lb⋅ft) at 4000	216 N⋅m (159 lb⋅ft) at 3600	200 N⋅m (148 lb⋅ft) at 3900; 235 N⋅m (173 lb⋅ft) at 4400	265 N⋅m (195 lb⋅ft) at 3600	387 N⋅m (285 lb⋅ft) at 3300
Fuel System:	Electronic multipoint injection (Bosch LE-Jetronic)	Digitally controlled multipoint injection (Bosch Motronic)			
Cooling:	water				
Transmission:	4-speed automatic, 5-speed manual				5-speed manual
Brakes:	Front: ventilated disc brakes Ø 280 mm, rear: ventilated disc brakes Ø 270 mm			Front: ventilated disc brakes Ø 296 mm, rear: disc brakes Ø 270 mm	
Body structure:	Sheet steel, unibody construction				
Track front/rear:	1,462 mm (57.6 in)/1,484 mm (58.4 in)				
Wheelbase:	2,730 mm (107.5 in)				
Length:	4,845 mm (190.7 in)				
Dry weight:	1,450–1,650 kg (3,195–3,640 lb)				
Top speed:	210 km/h (130 mph)	215 km/h (134 mph)	225 km/h (140 mph)	240 km/h (149 mph)	255 km/h (158 mph)
0–100 km/h (0–62 mph):	10.5 s	9.8 s	9.0 s	7.8 s	6.5 s
