= Hardtop =

Automobile roof

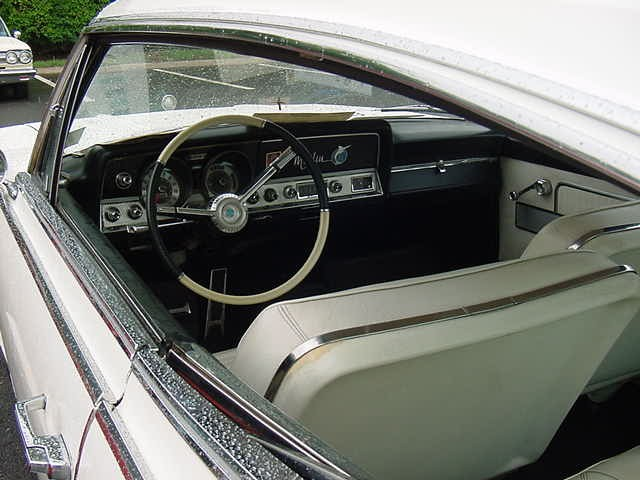
1965 Rambler Marlin, a pillarless hardtop

A hardtop is a rigid form of automobile roof, typically metal, and integral to the vehicle's design, strength, and style. The term typically applies to a pillarless hardtop, a car body style without a B-pillar. The term "pillared hardtop" was used in the 1970s to refer to cars with a B-pillar but frameless door glass, like a pillarless hardtop.

In some cases, a hardtop roof can be detachable (often designed to be stored in the trunk) or retractable within the vehicle itself.

== Pillarless hardtop ==
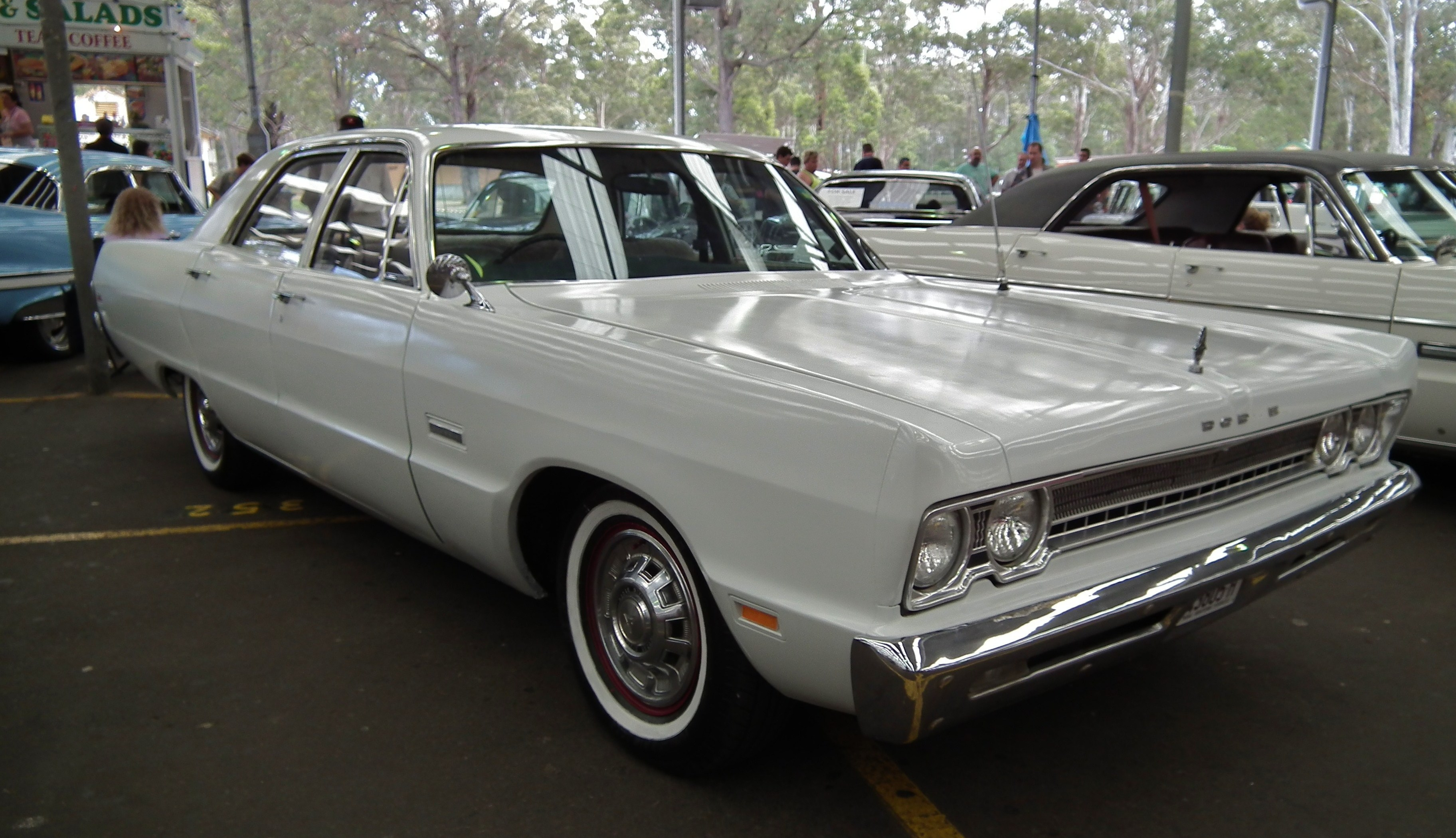
1969 Australian Dodge Phoenix four-door sedan has a B-pillar and painted window frames

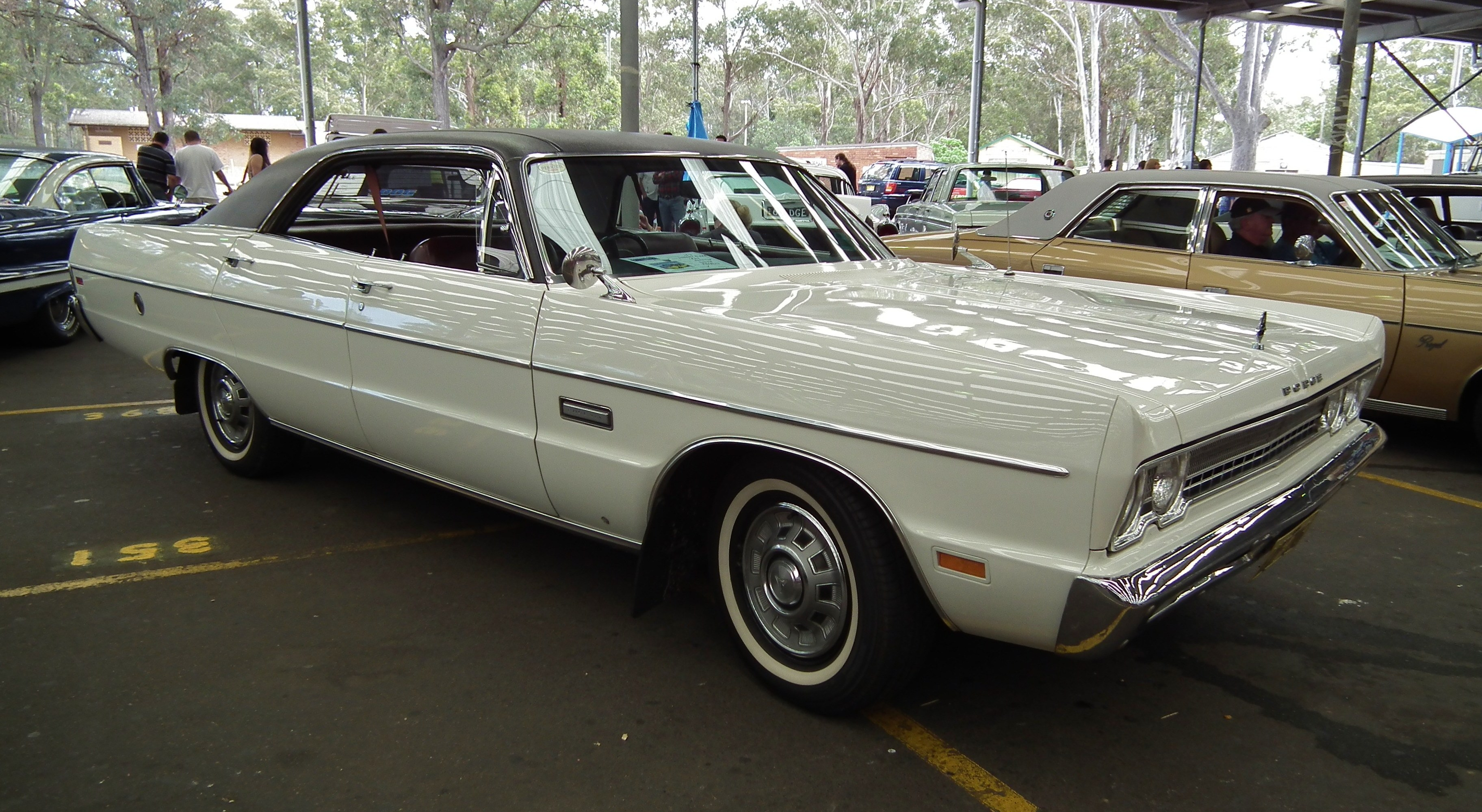
1969 Dodge Phoenix 400 four-door hardtop. The lack of a B-pillar and window frames, added vinyl roof, wider C-pillar, and softened roofline create an appearance similar to a convertible.

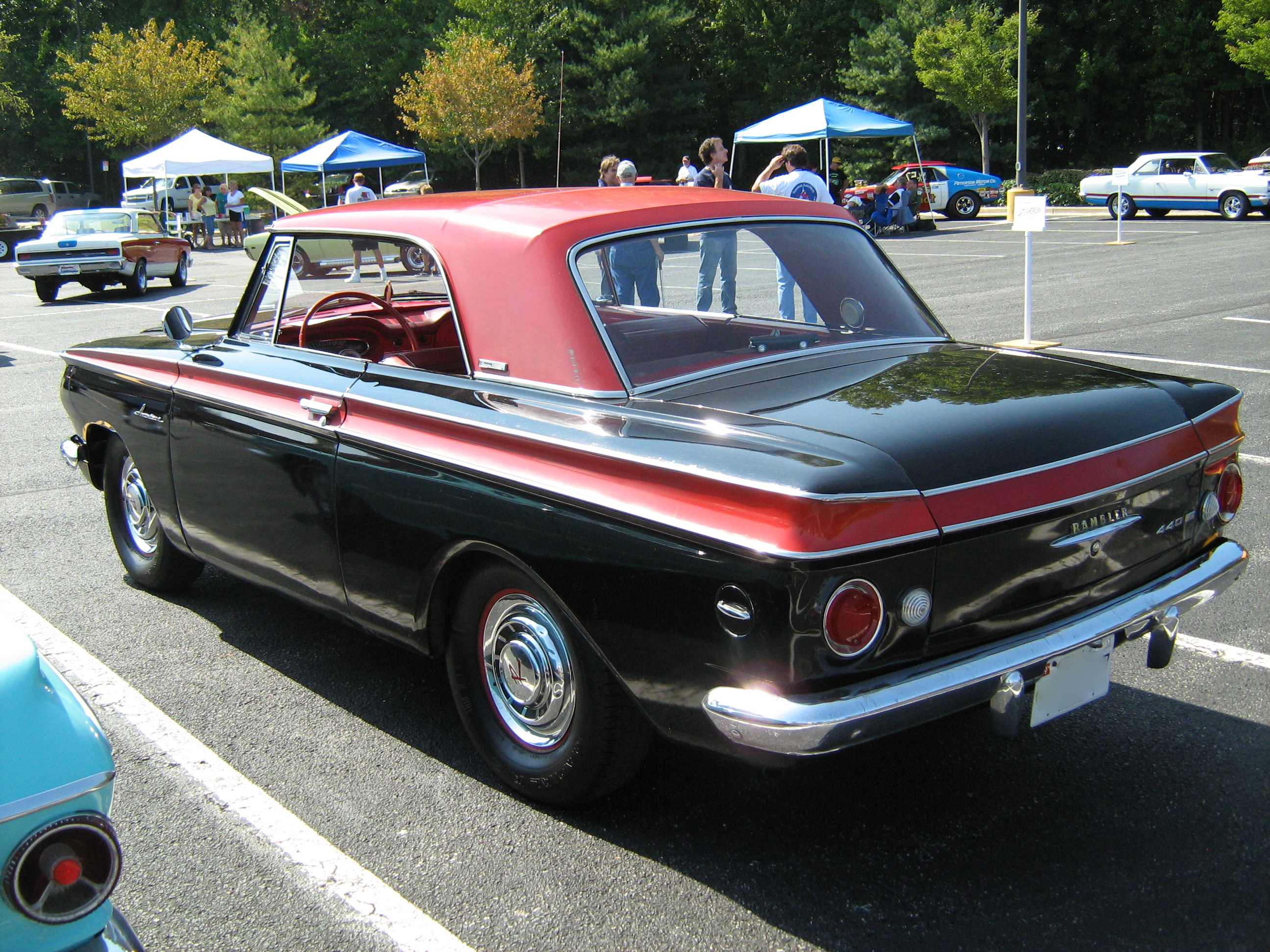
1963 Rambler American hardtop featured roof styling with crease lines to resemble convertible top bows

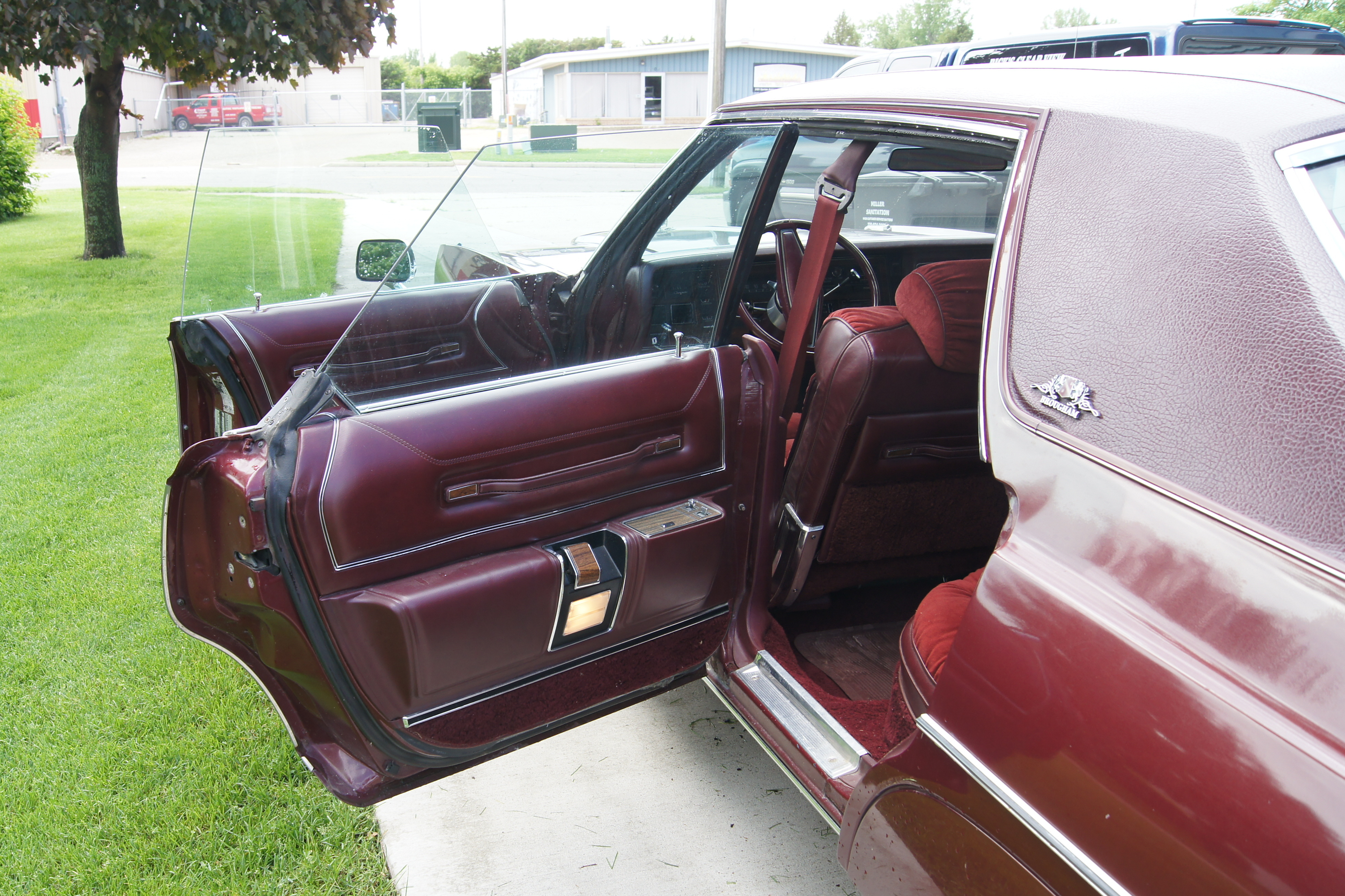
1976 Chrysler New Yorker with doors open. Note the absence of a driver's vent window and half-height pillar to which the rear doors attach.

The pillarless hardtop (abbreviated as "hardtop") is a post-World War II car body designed with no center or B-pillar or glass frames. If window glass frames are present, they are designed to retract with the window when lowered. This creates an impression of uninterrupted glass along the side of the car. Even the smaller automakers like Packard introduced two-door hardtops in 1952 "as a response to America's newly discovered fondness for sportier looking cars that resembled a convertible, but had the comfort and convenience of a two-door sedan."

In one instance, stylists added faux ribbing to a hardtop roof to make it appear to be like a convertible top, By the mid-1960s, optional vinyl roofs became widely available in virtually all model lines, reinforcing the convertible look in hardtops.

A pillarless hardtop is inherently less rigid than a pillared body, so it requires additional underbody strength to prevent shaking. Production hardtops commonly share the frame or reinforced body structure of the contemporary convertible model, which is reinforced to compensate for the lack of a fixed roof. The hardtop design received criticism that its roof structure may not provide adequate protection during a rollover crash.

Subsequent research reported that rates of serious or fatal injury in hardtop models (both two- and four-door versions), as well as four-door station wagons, were significantly lower than sedans, while the rates of any degree of injury for those same body styles were also significantly lower. A 1980 study for evaluation of rollover test devices reported that a greater degree of roof crush was associated with hardtop body styles, but severe passenger injury was not more frequent than in the other car body styles.

The hardtop body style began to disappear, along with convertibles, in the mid-1970s, partly due to concerns about safety and regulations in the United States that would be onerous for pillarless models to meet, as well as the downsizing trend with less ornate designs.

The ascendancy of monocoque construction also made the pillarless design less practical. Some models adopted modified roof styling, placing the B-pillars behind the tinted side window glass and painting or molding the outer side of each pillar in black to make them less visible, creating a hardtop look without actually omitting the pillar. Some mid- to late-1970s models continued their previous two-door hardtop bodies, but with fixed rear windows or a variety of vinyl roof and opera window treatments.

By the end of the 1990s, almost all hardtop designs were discontinued as structural integrity standards increased.

Hardtops were typically more expensive than regular sedan models when new. They are more collectible than standard models of the same vehicle, which have a B-pillar.

=== Origins ===
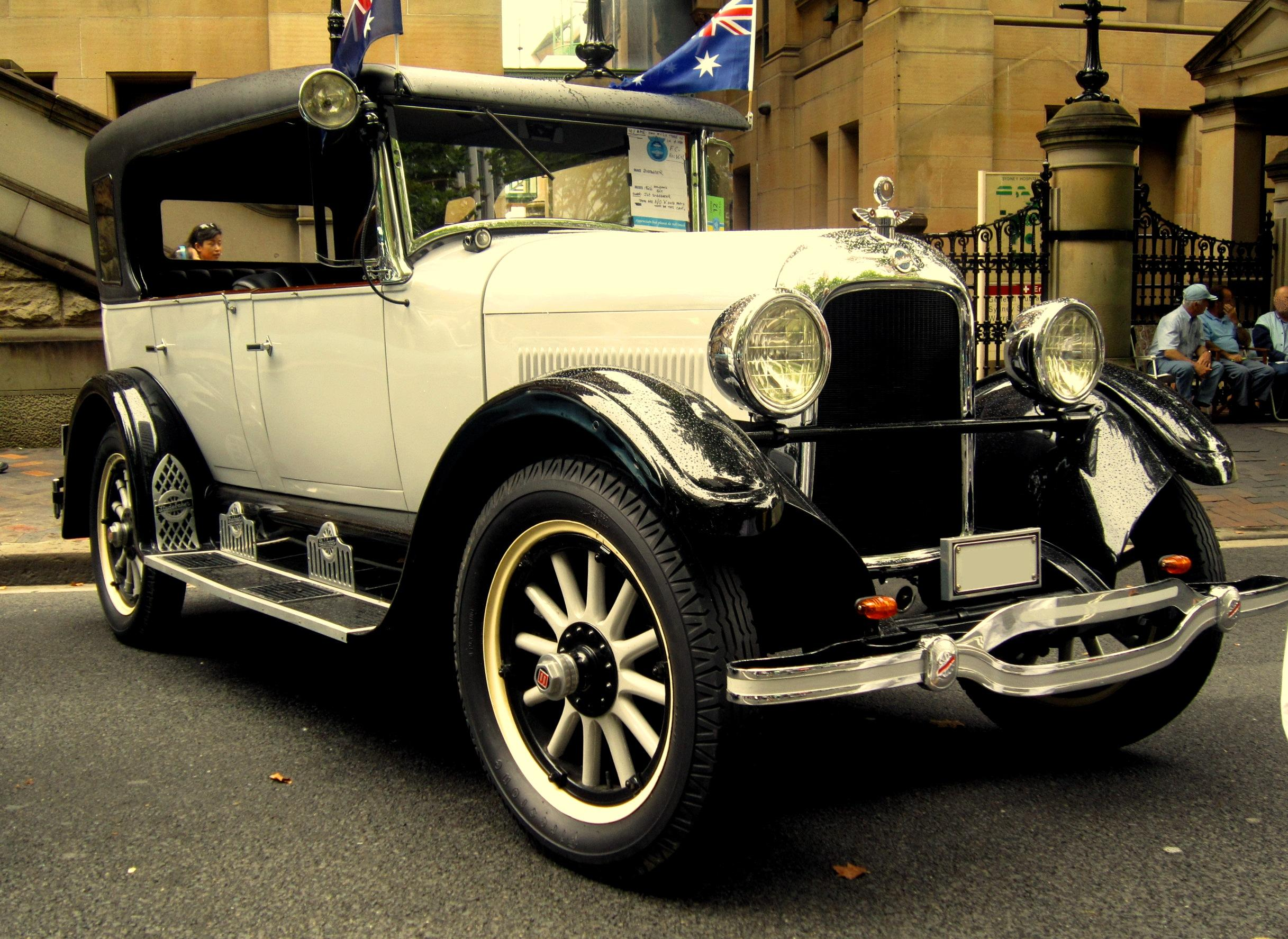
California Top on a 1926 Studebaker Special Six Phaeton

Early automobiles had no roof or sides, but by 1900, several cars were offered with fabric roofs and primitive folding tops. However, cars with fully closed bodies (i.e., with a rigid roof and sides) grew in popularity and soon became the norm.

In 1915–1918, the first pillarless hardtop cars were produced, then called "convertible cars" (or "touring sedans" or "Springfields"). The Springfield design featured folding upper frames on the doors, and the rear glass frames were removable and stored under or behind the seats. In the late teens, Cadillac offered a sedan with removable "B" pillars.

Another form of early pillarless hardtop is the "California top", originating in Los Angeles and most popular from 1917 to 1927. These were designed to replace the folding roofs of touring cars, to enclose the sides of the car for better weather protection. One objective of these aftermarket tops was to bring the cost of the closed car nearer to the prices of corresponding open cars. Automobile dealers were encouraged to equip an open car with a California top to demonstrate that they were "cool and clean in summer, and warm and dry in winter." The hard tops were frequently equipped with celluloid windows that retracted like a roller blind for open sided motoring offering a low-cost compromise between an open and closed car.

=== United States ===
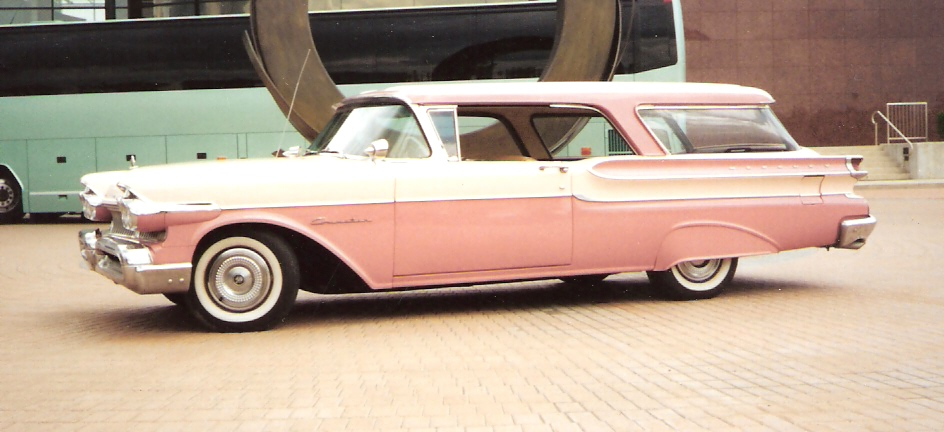
Two-door hardtop wagon:
1957 Mercury Commuter

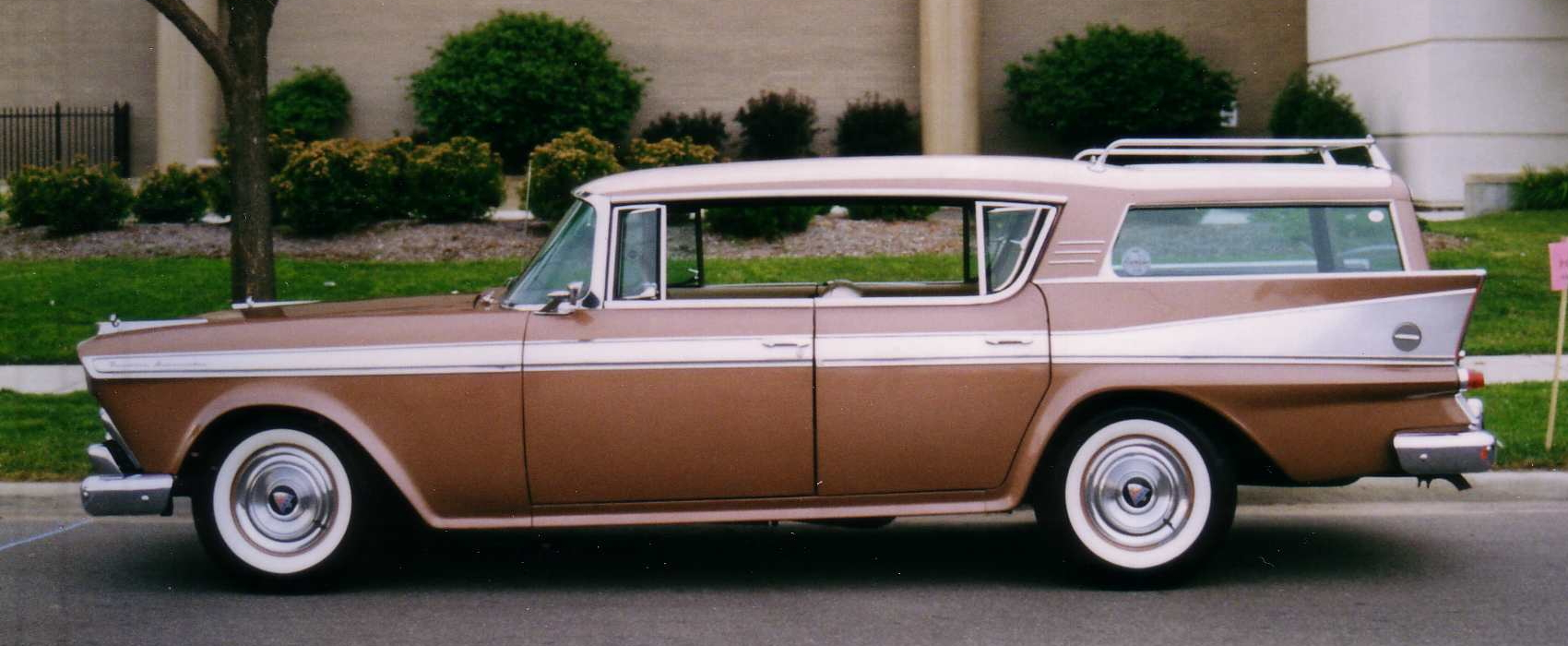
Four-door hardtop wagon:
1958 Rambler Ambassador

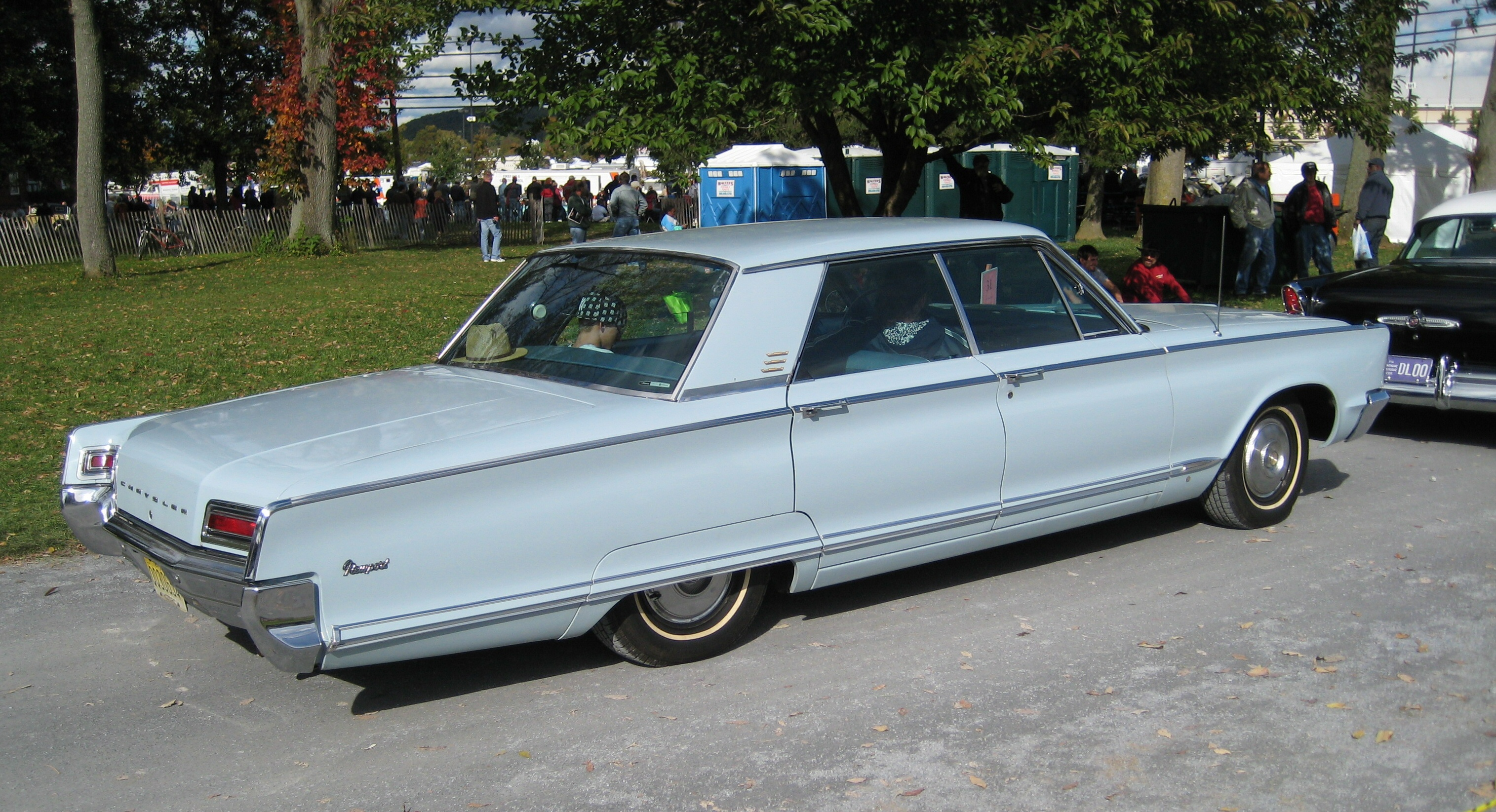
Four-door hardtop sedan:
1966 Chrysler Newport

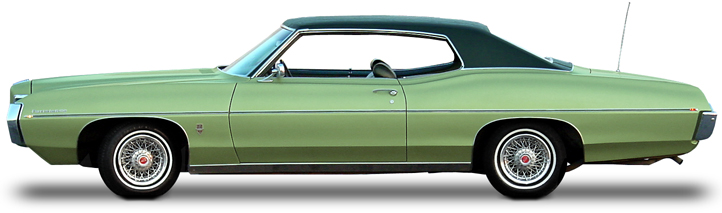
Two-door hardtop coupe:
1969 Pontiac Parisienne

There were a variety of hardtop-like body styles dating back to 1916. Chrysler Corporation built seven pillarless Town and Country hardtop coupes as concept vehicles in 1946, and even included the body style in its advertising that year, called the Town and Country Custom Club Coupe. In 1951, Plymouth offered the Cranbrook Belvedere as a low-priced hardtop two-door until 1953.

Mass-production of hardtops began with General Motors, which launched two-door, pillarless hardtops in 1949 as the Buick Roadmaster Riviera, Oldsmobile 98 Holiday, and Cadillac Coupe de Ville. They were purportedly inspired by the wife of a Buick executive who always drove convertibles, but never lowered the top.

The Kaiser-Frazer 1949 Virginian was an early example of a four-door hardtop, albeit with a removable thin, chrome- and-glass 'B' pillar held on by five screws. The car was designed to have a convertible look, and padded nylon or cotton was applied over the roof, contributing to the soft-top appearance.

Two-door hardtops became popular with consumers in the 1950s, while the two-door sedan body design fell out of favor among buyers.

In 1955, General Motors introduced the first four-door hardtops. Following the pattern established by the two-door variants, GM utilized the same special sub-designations for the pillarless four-door body types within all their brands in North America. The term de Ville was used for Cadillac, Riviera was used for Buick, Holiday was used for Oldsmobile, Catalina was used for Pontiac, and Bel Air was used for Chevrolet.

Other manufacturers also designated unique names for their pillarless models. Ford called them Victoria; Chrysler used Newport for its luxury division; Imperial used the name Southampton; Packard named them Mayfair; and Hudson's were Hollywoods. Nash used the Country Club moniker, while pillarless Studebakers were called Starliners, a name later used by Ford for its Galaxie hardtop.

By 1956, every major U.S. automaker offered two- and four-door hardtops in their respective model lineups. General Motors restyled its new models and offered four-door hardtops from every division and nearly every series except the lowest-priced lines. Chrysler also offered two- and four-door hardtops for every brand, from Imperial, Chrysler, DeSoto, Dodge, and Plymouth.

In 1956, the first four-door hardtop station wagons were introduced to the Rambler line by American Motors Corporation. The following year, the Mercury Commuter hardtop wagons became available in both two- and four-door body styles. Chrysler built four-door hardtop station wagons through 1964 in both the Chrysler and Dodge 880 lines.

Throughout the 1960s, the two-door pillarless hardtop was the most popular body style across most lines that offered such a model. Even on family-type vehicles like the Chevrolet Impala, the two-door hardtop regularly outsold four-door sedans. Some car lines (such as the 1957-64 Cadillac and 1965–69 Corvair) offered only pillarless models, with no pillared sedans. So prevalent were true hardtops that Popular Mechanics had to describe that the new full-sized 1967 Oldsmobile Delmont models even included a "pillar" sedan.

The U.S. industry's last pillarless two-door and four-door hardtops were in the 1978 Chrysler Newport and New Yorker lines. Since then, no U.S. manufacturer has offered a true hardtop in regular production.

=== Europe ===
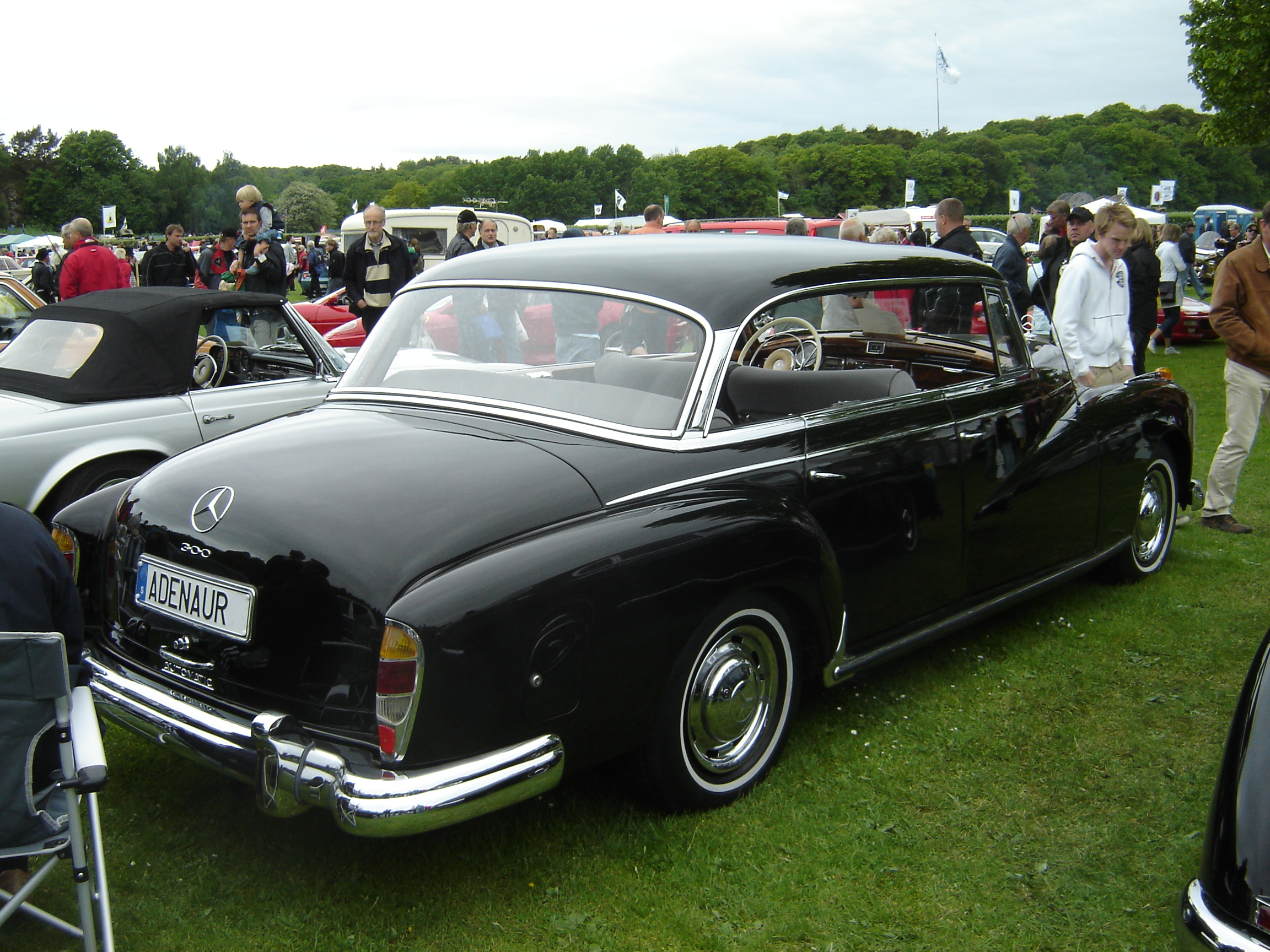
The Mercedes-Benz 300d was marketed as a "pillarless phaeton"

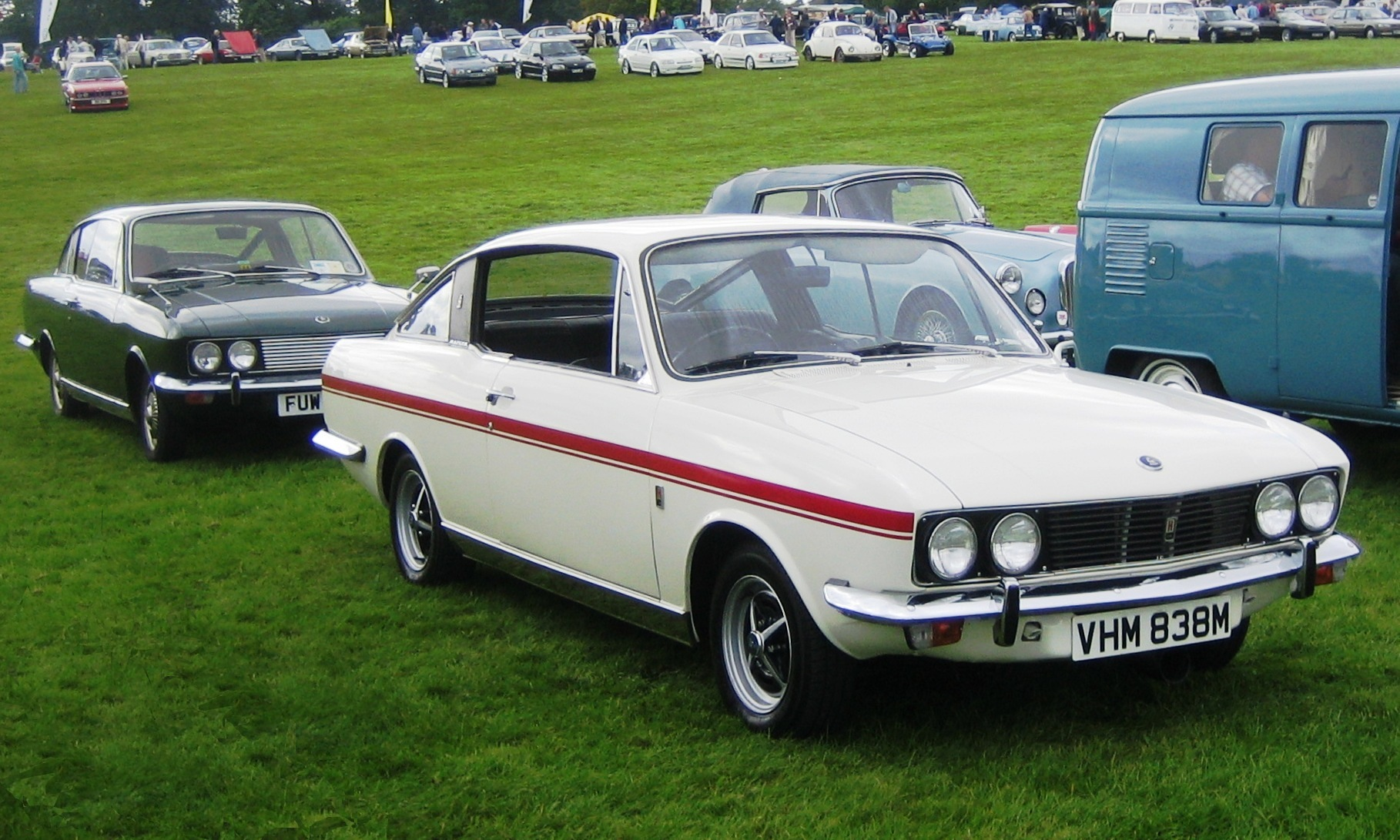
Two 1973 Sunbeam Rapiers: first with side windows lowered and raised on the second car

Various European manufacturers have produced hardtops without B-pillars (usually coupes). However, they are rarely marketed as pillarless hardtops. Examples include the current Bentley Continental GT, the 2008 Bentley Brooklands, the 2001-2003 Renault Avantime, the Rolls-Royce Wraith, and the 2012-2017 Ford B-Max. The 1958-1964 Facel Vega Excellence is one of the few four-door hardtops produced in Europe.

German pillarless hardtops included cars from Taunus, a Ford subbrand. Namely the Ford Taunus P5 and Ford P7, including both P7A and P7B versions. They had regular coupe versions with B pillars, but the Hardtop Taunus models had no B pillar and provided an open-air feel inside the car when all the windows were rolled down. DKW was the only German manufacturer that offered pillarless two-door windows, as well as wrap-around windows at the back of the glasshouse from 1953 (3=6 F91) onward, and with a wrap-around windscreen since 1959 (1000 Coupe).

British pillarless hardtops included the Sunbeam Rapier and the Ford Consul Capri (355), which, unlike American models, sold fewer cars than their regular center-pillar saloon versions.

A New Mini two-door sedan has been marketed as a hardtop in the United States, and includes a structural B-pillar on the inside that is disguised on the exterior by a black border on the fixed rear windows.

The Mercedes E-class Coupe (C238) from 2016 is an example of a modern pillarless design.

=== Japan ===
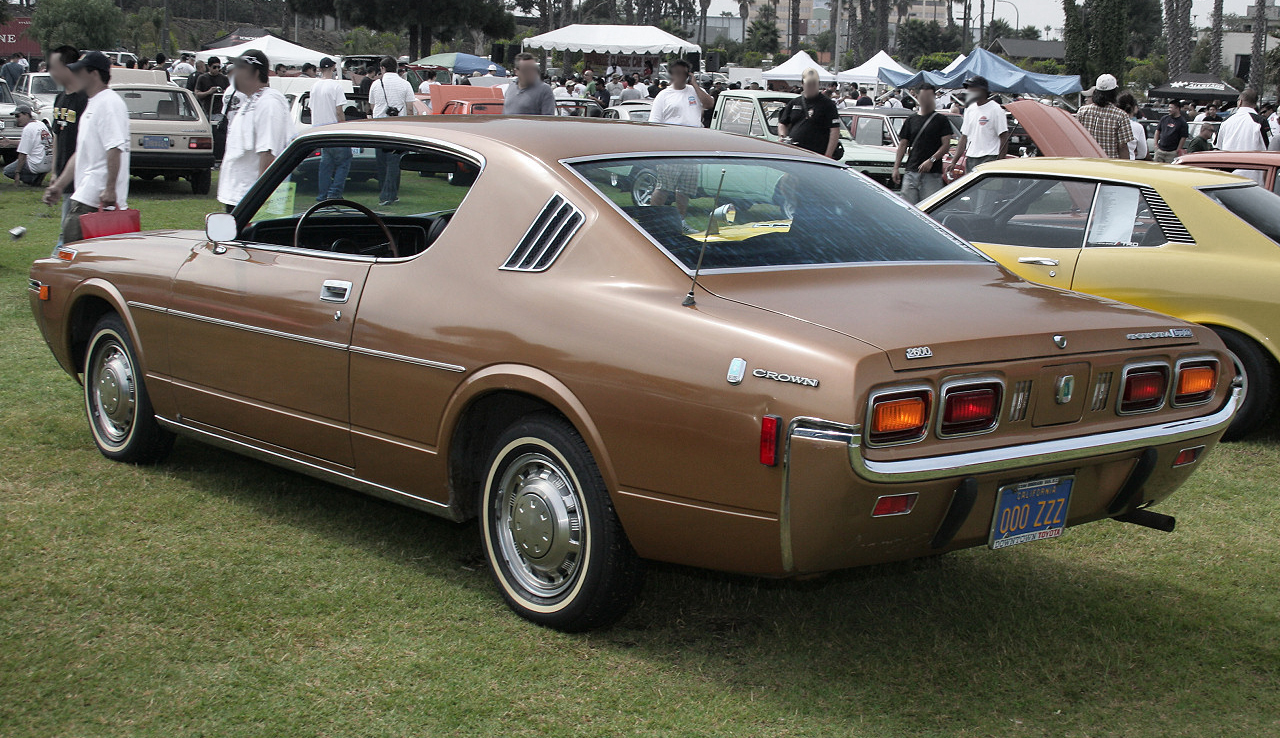
1972 Toyota Crown with side windows lowered

In July 1965, Toyota introduced Japan's first two-door hardtop in the third generation Toyota Corona line. This was followed by several manufacturers offering the popular body style with a luxury-car appearance. During the 1970s, Toyota produced the Toyota Crown in a genuine two-door hardtop, while offering a pillared four-door hardtop sedan.

Nissan followed suit with the Nissan Cedric and Nissan Gloria but offered a genuine pillarless four-door hardtop along with a two-door hardtop body style, with the latter "rendered as a premium quality personal car." Subaru introduced a new compact coupe as a genuine two-door hardtop with the Subaru Leone in 1971. The pillarless hardtop models were more expensive and luxurious than the sedan versions.

In the 1980s, Toyota continued the design with a pillared four-door hardtop Mark II, while Nissan again offered a genuine hardtop sedan with its Laurel. Toyota introduced a genuine four-door hardtop with the Toyota Carina ED, followed by the Toyota Corona EXiV. Mazda marketed its Luce and Subaru from 1989 until 2009 with their Legacy/Outback sedans and station wagons as a pillared hardtop.

== Detachable hardtops ==
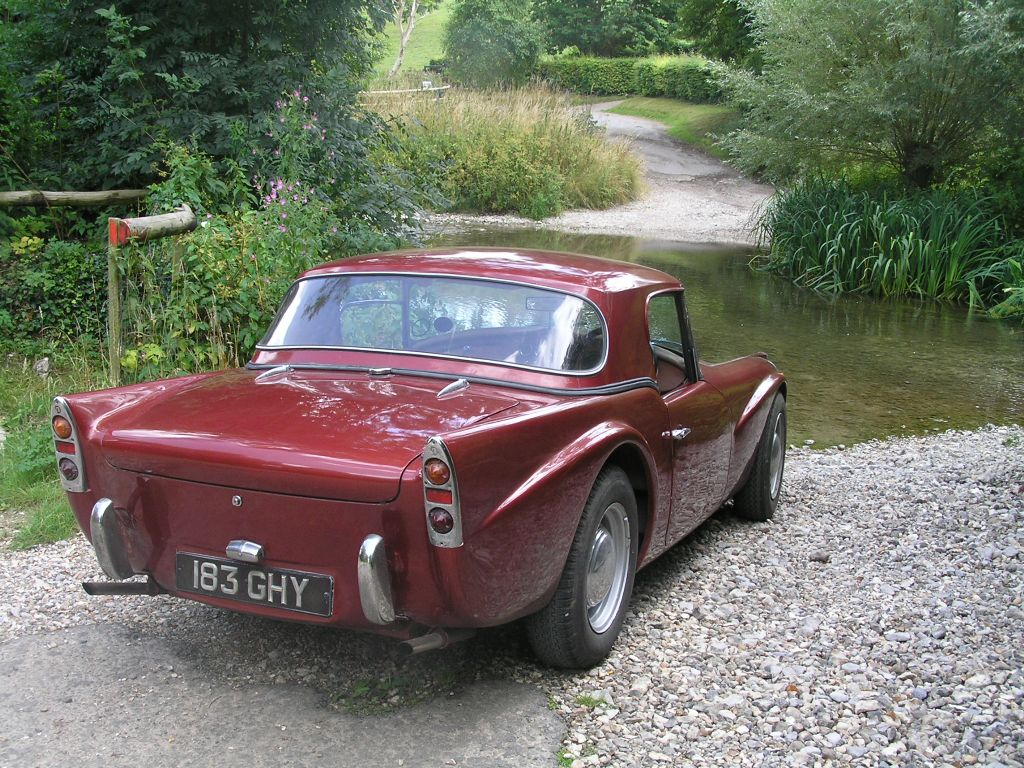
1959 Daimler SP250 with detachable hardtop

A detachable hardtop is a rigid, removable roof panel that is often stored in a car's trunk/boot.

== Retractable hardtops ==
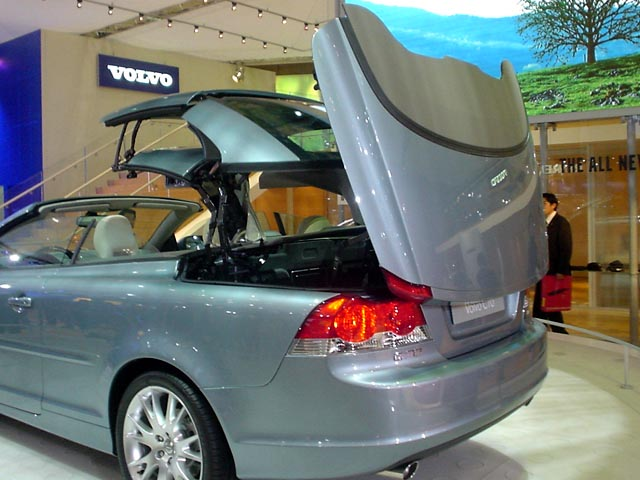
2005 Volvo C70 with retractable hardtop

A retractable hardtop (also known as a coupé convertible or coupé cabriolet) is a type of convertible that forgoes a folding textile roof in favor of an automatically operated, multi-part, self-storing roof with rigid sections that are opaque, translucent, or independently operable.
