= Ford P7 =

Ford 17M (1967–1971) Ford 20M (1967–1971) Ford 26M (1969–1971)
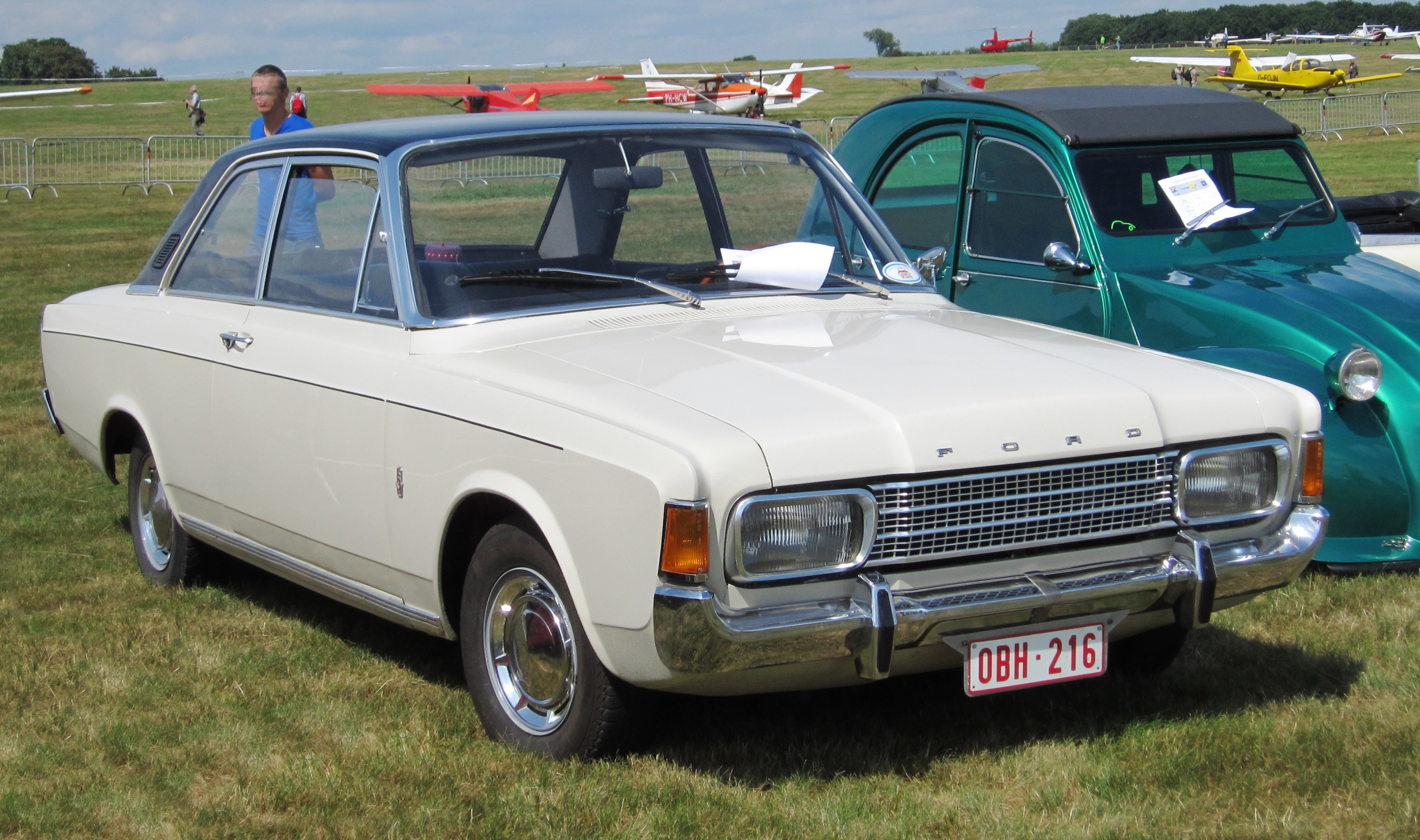
- Ford 17M 2 door saloon (P7b)

Overview
- Manufacturer: Ford Germany
- Also called: Ford Taunus P7a (1967–1968); Ford Taunus P7b (1968–1971)
- Production: September 1967 – December 1971
- Assembly: Germany: Cologne-Niehl; Belgium: Genk; South Africa: Port Elizabeth (FMCSA); South Korea: Ulsan (Hyundai)

Body and chassis
- Class: Executive car (E)
- Body style: 2-door or 4-door saloon 3-door or 5-door "Turnier" estate car 2-door coupé 2-door coach-built (Karl Deutsch) cabriolet

Powertrain
- Engine: 1498 cc Taunus V4; 1699 cc Taunus V4; 1812 cc Cologne V6 (from 1968); 1998 cc Cologne V6; 2293 cc Cologne V6; 2550 cc Cologne V6 (from 1969)
- Transmission: 4-speed all-synchromesh manual with column-mounted shifter floor-mounted lever sometimes included or optional 3-speed automatic (26M, optional at extra cost on some others)

Dimensions
- Wheelbase: 2,705 mm (106.5 in)
- Length: 4,627–4,735 mm (182.2–186.4 in) (P7a); 4,673–4,721 mm (184.0–185.9 in) (P7b)
- Width: 1,756 mm (69.1 in)
- Height: 1,464–1,478 mm (57.6–58.2 in)
- Curb weight: 1,050–1,230 kg (2,315–2,712 lb)

Chronology
- Predecessor: Ford Taunus 17M P5
- Successor: Ford Granada

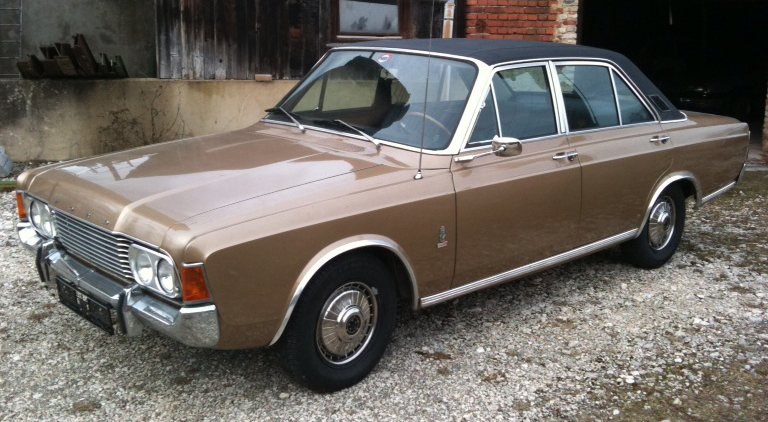
Ford 26M (P7b) with four doors

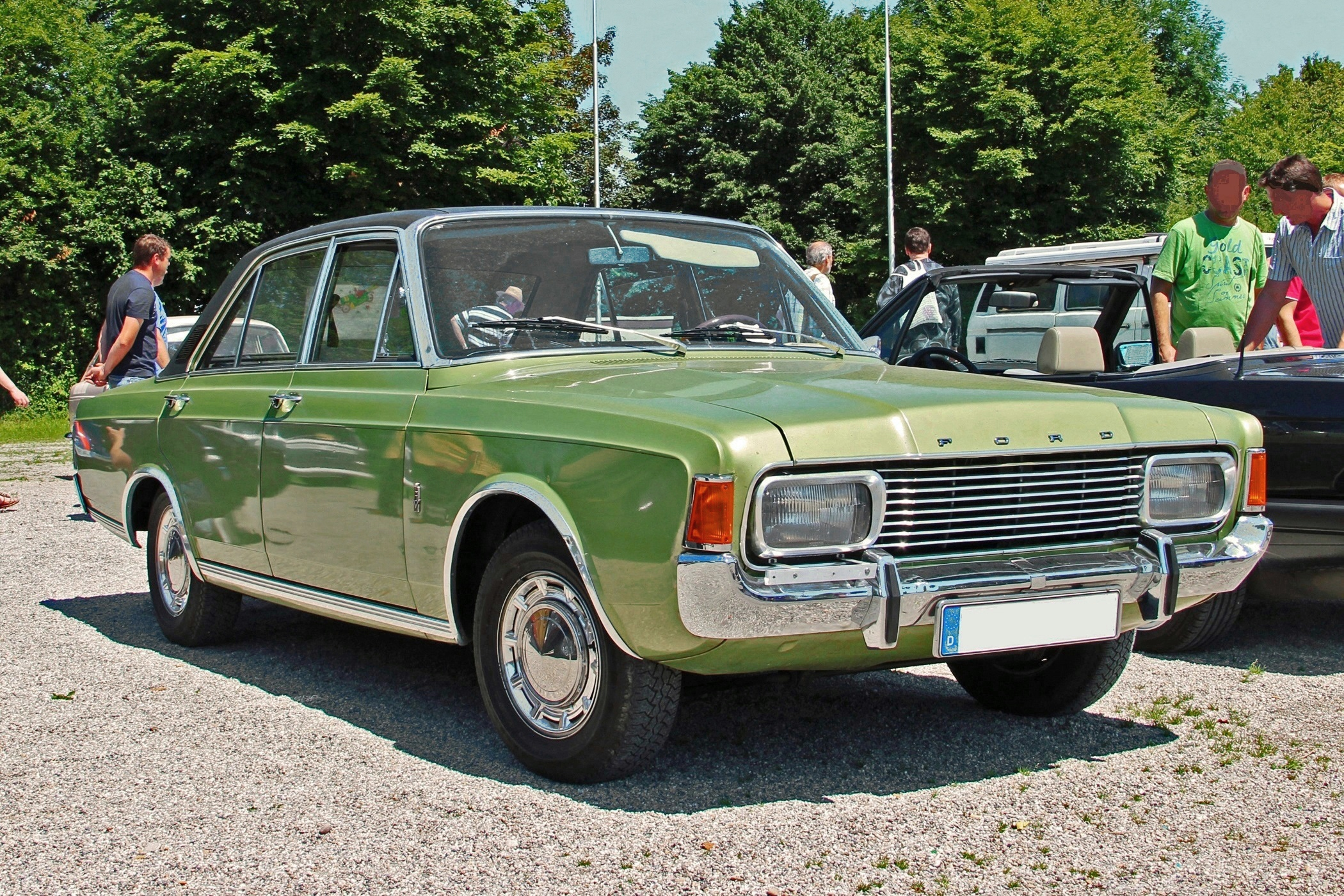
Ford 17M (P7b) with four doors

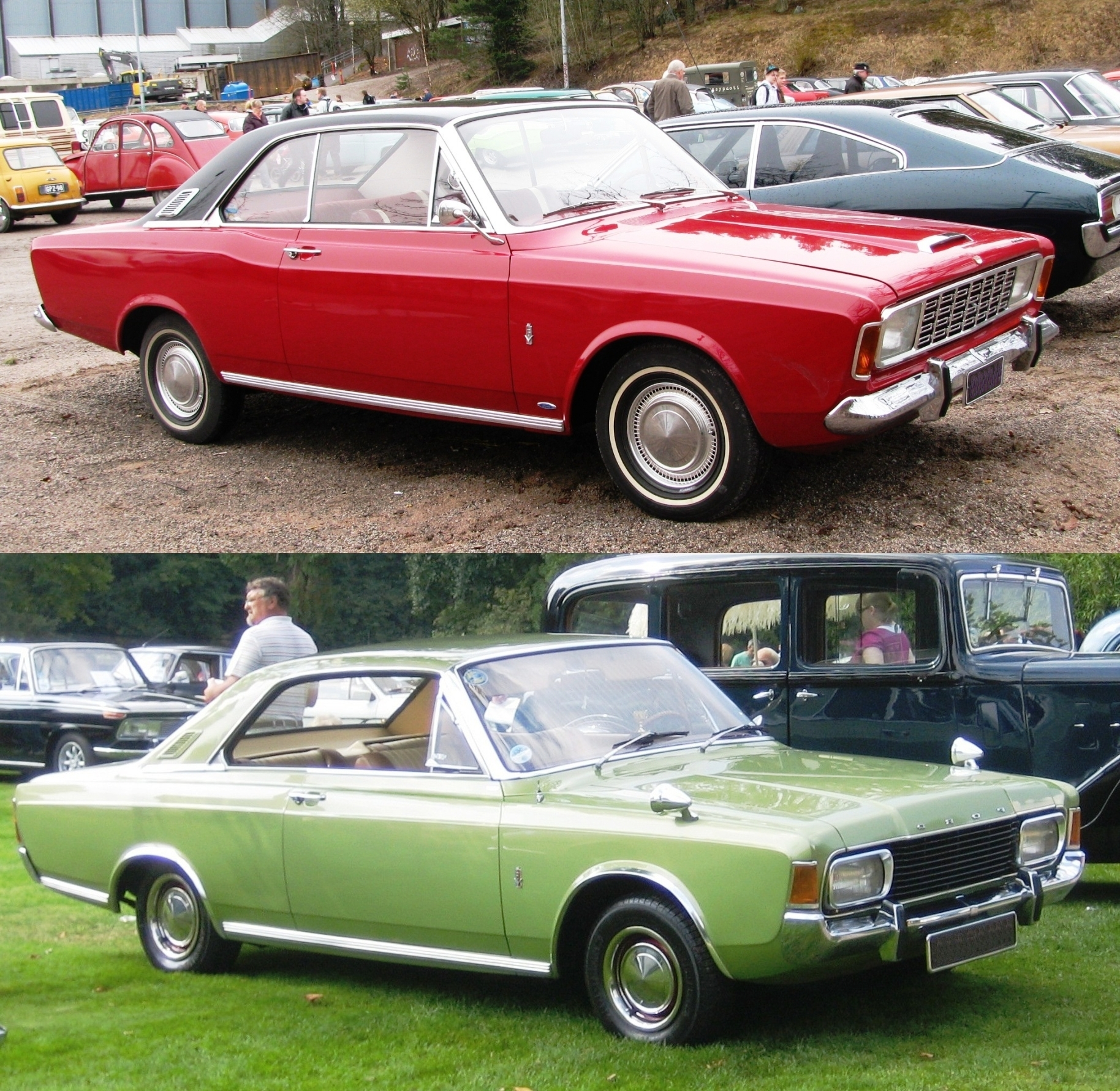
The facelift of 1968, undertaken when the car had been on sale for less than a year, did not significantly change the overall silhouette of the car (here shown as a two-door coupé), but the new version came with several of the bumps and creases removed.

The Ford P7 is a range of large family saloons produced by Ford Germany between autumn 1967 and December 1971. The P7 was marketed as the Ford 17M, Ford 20M and Ford 26M.

At launch, the 17M was available with four different engine sizes, ranging from 1.5 to 2.3 litres. The more lavishly appointed 20M was also offered, but only with the larger two engines. The range was subsequently broadened further, and from 1969, the 26M joined the range, featuring the same body, but a larger engine, automatic transmission as standard, and various other luxury features.

The Taunus 17M name had been applied to a succession of family saloons from Ford Germany since 1957, but the introduction of the 1967 car coincided with the removal of the "Taunus" name. Nevertheless, for the avoidance of confusion, the 17M and 20M models introduced in 1967, as well as the 26M introduced in 1969, are usually identified, in retrospect, as the Ford P7. It was the seventh newly designed German Ford to be launched after the Second World War, so it was from inception known within the company as Ford Project 7 (P7) or more simply as the Ford P7.

During the months following its introduction, sales were disappointing and the company rushed to produce an extensively face-lifted model. This appeared, with various styling changes and a modified range of engine options, in August 1968, less than a year after the P7's introduction. To differentiate between the model produced before August 1968, and that produced between August 1968 and the end of 1971, the former is normally designated as the Ford P7a and the latter as the Ford P7b. The P7a had slightly different bodywork up front for the four-cylinder (17M) and six-cylinder (20M) models, with a 72 mm (2.8 in) longer front overhang. The P7b did away with this barely noticeable distinction.

Between September 1967 and August 1968, 155,780 P7a models were produced. Between August 1968 and December 1971, 567,482 P7b models were produced.

== Evolutionary design and a lukewarm reception ==
The Ford Taunus P7 inherited its wheelbase from the previous model, but the new body was nevertheless longer and wider, though lower. This reflected the design trends evident throughout western Europe at the time, but the extent of growth in the footprint of the Ford P7 was matched by few other cars, although a very similar trend had been evident at Dagenham where Ford of Britain's new Zephyr Mk IV model had also excited national press comment because it took up so much more road-space than its predecessor.

The P7 was also longer and wider than the Opel Rekord, which still set the standard for large family cars in Germany; a feeling in the press was expressed that its styling was more Anglo-American than mainstream European. An otherwise not unsympathetic review in August 1967 described the car as a Volksstrassenkreuzer, and expressed the view that such a "peoples' boulevard cruiser" might be out of tune with the spirit of the marketplace, at least in Europe. Doubts in the press would not have mattered too much if the new 17M had enjoyed a warmer welcome in the showrooms, but it was the warmer welcome received from the market in 1968 by two new entrants to the segment, the Audi 100 and the imported Peugeot 504, which suggested that the antennae of the journalist may have been more accurately attuned to the preferences of Germany's family car market than those of Ford's marketing department.

=== Engine ===
As on the previous (Taunus) 17M, the engine was front-mounted and drove the rear wheels.

In 1967, where the previous 17M had offered a choice of only two engine sizes, the new car offered, from the beginning four, starting at the bottom of the range with the 1498 cc "low compression" V4 engine already offered in the smaller 15M. Most 17Ms, nevertheless, continued to be delivered with the 1699 cc V4. Also familiar to drivers of the previous generation of 17Ms will have been the 1998 cc V6 1998 cc, with which Ford continued to offer a six-cylinder saloon at a bargain price. The same 1998 cc engine was the entry-level unit for the new Ford 20M, which also shared the body of the 17M. Newly available in both the 17M and the 20M was a V6 "high compression" 2293 cc unit. This shared the 60.14 mm (2.4 in) stroke of the 2.0-litre motor, but had its cylinders bored out by an extra 6 mm (0.2 in) to 90 mm (3.5 in). The 1.7- and 2.0-litre units were available either in low- or high-compression forms. The high-compression engines offered a claimed increase of about 5 PS (4 kW; 5 hp) in maximum power, but drivers of high-compression engined cars had to pay more at the petrol/gas station for "super" grade higher-octane fuel. Across the range of engines offered in 1967, the maximum advertised power output ranged between 60 and 125 PS (92 kW; 123 hp)

With the extensive facelift that followed the annual works shutdown at the end of summer 1968, the engine range was also broadened with the introduction of an 1812 cc V6 "high compression" unit. This 82 PS (60 kW; 81 hp) engine was fitted in an aggressively priced version of the 17M, offered at a starting price of 9150 Marks. 1968 also had the arrival of a new version of the V6 "high compression" 2293 cc unit, now offering 125 PS (92 kW; 123 hp).

In 1969, a further bid was made to broaden the P7 range towards the market territory occupied by the smaller models from Mercedes-Benz. The 26M launched that year shared the body and most of the elements of the 20M, but added to it a long list of luxury touches such as the automatic gear box, power steering, sunroof, twin headlamps, bigger front brakes and tinted windows. The 26M also offered a new V6 engine of 2550 cc. The cylinder dimensions were identical to those of the four-cylinder 1699 cc V4 engine from the 17M, which helped with the standardisation of componentry. The larger engine in the 26M offered the same 125 PS (92 kW; 123 hp) as the top version of the 2293 cc unit previously offered in the 20M, but in the 26M torque was increased by 10%.

=== Wide body ===
The body was an all-steel monocoque structure, following what had by now become a universal pattern among the larger European automakers. Promotional material made much of the spacious interior and massive boot/trunk space resulting from the car's 1,756 mm (69.1 in) width, and the correspondingly wide track was credited with ensuring good handling and road holding.

Body configurations were the same as those offered on the previous (Taunus) 17M range. Top sellers from the range were the two- and four-door saloons, and the three- and five-door "Turnier" estates were also heavily promoted. A version of the three-door "Turnier" with the side windows behind the B pillars replaced by steel panels was made available for people whose work and tax status called for a small van, but who nevertheless preferred to drive a car. A two-door coupé was offered. The Ford P7 was also the last of a long line of German Fords to be offered, at considerable extra cost, as a two-door coachbuilt Karl Deutsch cabriolet.

The top-of-the-range 26M only came as a four door saloon or two-door coupé, and was distinguished by its black vinyl roof and increased use of chrome and wood décor for its interior embellishments.

=== Running gear ===
In most important respects, the underpinnings of Taunus P7 were remarkably little changed from those of the previous model. However, with the 1967 models, Ford did finally join other automakers at this level of the market in providing a 12-volt electrical system at no extra cost.

A four-speed all-synchromesh manual gearbox came as a standard feature. The gearbox was controlled with a column-mounted lever in the lower-priced models, but floor mounting of gear levers was by now seen as a preferred location, and the more expensive models provided this. The automatic gearbox, where specified, was also controlled using a floor-mounted lever positioned between the two separate front seats.

Also inherited from the previous model was the combination of disc brakes at the front and drum brakes at the rear, but now with twin braking circuits as an additional safety feature, and servo-assistance. The 26M received enlarged front brake discs to complement its power-assisted steering, twin halogen headlights, and twin exhaust pipes.

The front suspension geometry was developed from that of the Ford P5 and again incorporated MacPherson struts. Telescopic dampers also improved the suspension of the wheels at the back of the car where the steel beam axle and the semielliptical leaf springs would have been familiar to drivers of earlier Taunus models. The rear suspension setup was by now seen as rather outclassed in comparison with traditional rivals from Opel, and tended to undermine any aspirations for the 26M version of the relatively lowly 17M/20M to compete in a higher class than the earlier 17M had attempted. The antiquated rear axle would be replaced by a more up-to-date semitrailing arm arrangement on the successor model, but Ford nevertheless remained curiously attached to the old combination of a rigid rear axle and leaf springs, and by now. uniquely among Germany's mainstream automakers, were still selling this rear axle configuration to buyers of the Ford Capri until 1984.

=== New name ===
Various theories have been put forward as to why the "Ford Taunus 17M" name of the P5 was replaced with "Ford 17M" for the P7. The most likely explanation seems to be that the Ford of Germany, which for the first time since the war, now had a German general (managing) director, in Max Ueber, who had previously worked as the company's sales director, took the view that the longer name was for most purposes too much of a mouthful.

=== Facelifts and upgrades ===
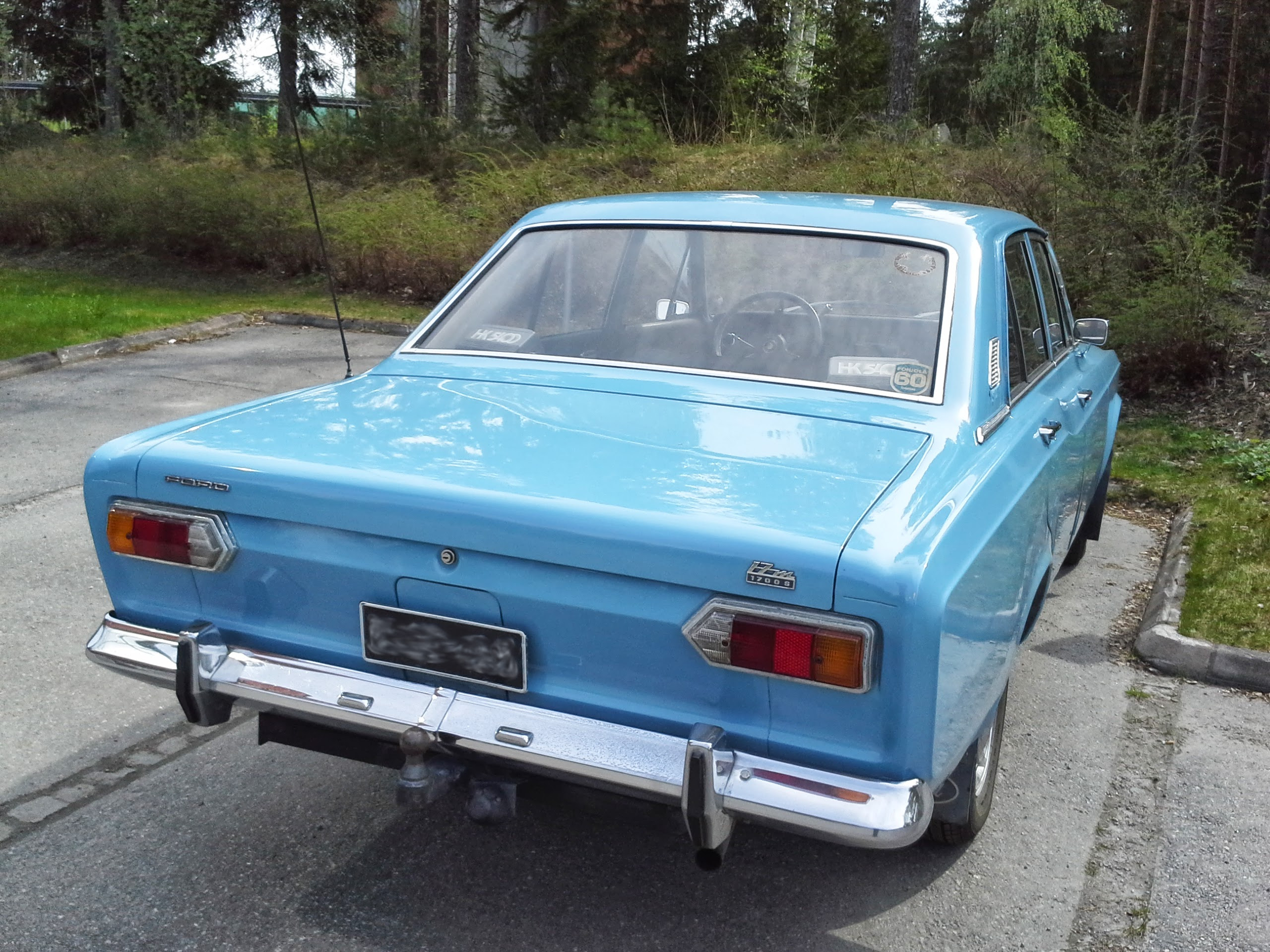
Ford 17M 1700S P7a, showing the early horizontal taillights

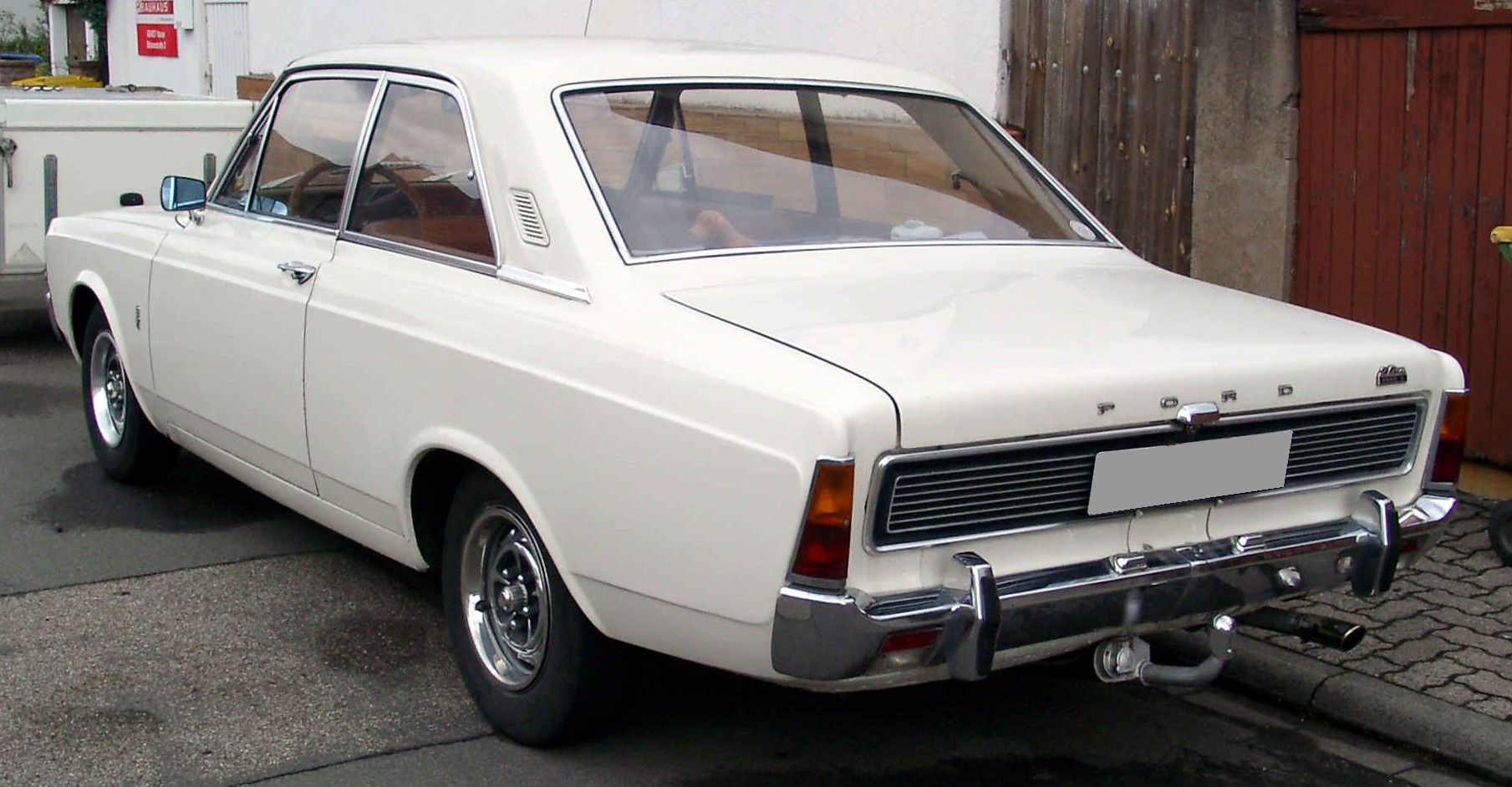
Ford 20M Hardtop P7b, facelifted rear

The emergency face-lift of 1968 left the overall silhouette of the P7 little changed, but a number of the fussier elements disappeared. The cheese-grater grille was replaced by a set of thin parallel bars and at the corners the meeting points between the lights and the bumpers were tidied up. The bumpers themselves were redesigned, with a new profile. The fake scoop on bonnet on the 20 TS was dropped, and also the "TS" name. Elsewhere various bumps and creases disappeared from the body work including a kink outlined in the panel below and slightly ahead of the C-pillar, which was one of the decorative features that had been criticised for what was seen as a sign of excessive Anglo-American influence. What was left was a simplified form that in some ways left the car looking larger than ever, but the overall impression was calmer.

The Marketing Department researched their files and retrieved for the Ford P7b a slogan coined for Bahnsen's innovatively styled 1960 Taunus P3, "Linie der Vernunft" which loosely translates as "rational form". This they now applied to the P7b. Now, as ten years earlier, the intention was to point up an aesthetic contrast between a newly simplified 17M model and an over-decorated predecessor.

=== Commercial ===
The P7, with its wider engine range was aimed at a significantly broader market segment than the Taunus P5. It is also noteworthy that the market segment for large family cars represented a greater share of the total market in Germany than in most European markets. Germany's top selling large family car, the Opel Rekord was for several years the second best selling car in Germany, beaten to the top spot only by the Volkswagen.

With 155,780 units sold during the ten month life of the P7a, the car was actually being produced at a significantly slower rate than the less ambitiously targeted Taunus P5. The company's hard work in promoting the car, the simplified lines of the P7b, and a relatively benign economic backdrop accounted for an improved rate during the period of slightly above three years between August 1968 and December 1971 during which 567, 482 of the cars were produced. The dominance in the sector enjoyed by the Opel Rekord was not challenged, however, and while neither Ford nor Opel will have been unduly alarmed by Volkswagen's ventures into the production of large family cars with their interesting but commercially unpersuasive 411/412 and K70 models, the arrival in 1968 of the Audi 100 suggested than the market place for large family cars was not about to become any more comfortable for Ford.

==== South Africa ====
Unusually for a German-designed Ford at the time, the 20M was produced in right hand drive in South Africa, where it was available with a 3.0-litre Essex engine. A version of the 17M was also marketed, fitted with the locally built 2.0-litre Essex V4, as well as one version powered by the Essex 2.5-litre V6.

=== Replacement ===
Production of the P7 came to an end in December 1971. Some sources give the car's final year as 1972 which presumably reflects Ford's ability to continue to supply, from "inventory" cars that could be registered as new, though they had been manufactured during the previous year. That was not unusual, although ceasing production of a model in December was.

Sales of the Ford P7 failed to keep pace with the growth in the German car market, which appears to have contributed to a major rethink. By 1971, Ford in the UK were still dominating local sales charts with their Escort and Cortina models, but were finding it increasingly difficult to manufacture cars to schedule or to a consistent quality level due to an increasingly uncooperative workforce, a problem across the UK motor industry. Ford in Germany seemed to have less trouble manufacturing cars to plan, with their plant in Genk (Belgium) still less than 10 years old and another new plant, at Saarlouis, having commenced large-scale production only in 1970. The problem in Germany was the different one of Ford's inability to retain market share against the market dominance of (especially) Opel and Volkswagen in the context of overall market growth. The creation of a new transnational organisational structure headed up since 1967 by Ford of Europe pointed the way to closer integration at all levels between Ford's principal European automaking businesses in Germany and Britain.

Prelaunch pictures of its successor started to appear in the press soon after P7 production ceased, although Ford waited until the Geneva Motor Show in March 1972 before formally presenting the Ford Consul/Granada. The new car came with engine sizes ranging from 1.7 to 3.0 litres, the largest engine resulting from the car's status as a joint project between Ford of Britain and Ford of Germany. In Germany, the new car featured a longer wheelbase and a larger engine at the top of the range than the market-leading Opel Rekord D, indicating that Ford wished to continue offering a little more car for the money than their principal rival. The Granada was nevertheless shorter than the P7, implying also some acknowledgment by Ford themselves that the Ford P7 had simply taken up more road space than the market expected of a large family car. The Granada was also shorter and narrower than the Ford Zephyr Mk IV produced by Ford of Britain, despite aspiring to replace both the P7 in Germany and the Zephyrs and Zodiacs in Britain. The large British Zephyrs had also been criticised for having become too large for the market niche their predecessor models had established, and only 102,417 Zephyrs together with 48,846 Zodiacs had been produced since the UK launch of the Mark IV versions of these cars in the spring of 1966. Publicity emphasizing the "European" style of the new Granada was, therefore, a response to marketplace criticism of both the last generation of Ford 17Ms in Germany and the last generation of Ford "Z-cars" in the UK.
