= Ford Taunus V4 engine =

Automobile engine

Ford Taunus V4
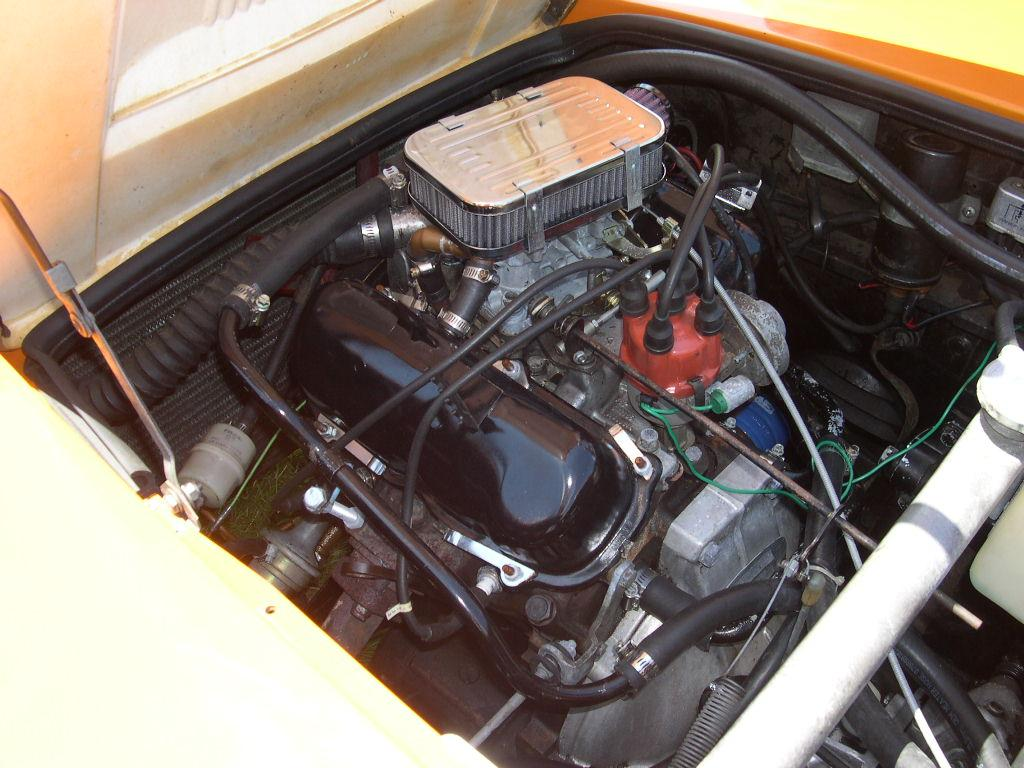
- Ford Taunus V4 in a Saab Sonett III

Overview
- Manufacturer: Ford Motor Company
- Also called: Taunus V4
- Production: 1962 – 1981

Layout
- Configuration: 60° V4
- Displacement: 1.2 L (1,183 cc); 1.3 L (1,288 cc); 1.5 L (1,498 cc); 1.7 L (1,699 cc)
- Cylinder bore: 80 mm (3.15 in); 84 mm (3.31 in); 90 mm (3.54 in)
- Piston stroke: 58.86 mm (2.317 in); 66.8 mm (2.63 in)
- Cylinder block material: Cast iron
- Cylinder head material: Cast iron
- Valvetrain: OHV 2 valves per cylinder

Combustion
- Supercharger: Naturally aspirated (stock)
- Turbocharger: None
- Fuel system: Carbureted
- Fuel type: Gasoline (Leaded)
- Oil system: Wet sump
- Cooling system: Jacketed block (stock)

Output
- Power output: 40–240 hp (30–179 kW)
- Torque output: 80–137 N⋅m (59–101 lb⋅ft)

Chronology
- Predecessor: Ford Sidevalve engine (1.2); Ford Taunus straight-four (1.5, 1.7)
- Successor: Ford Kent engine Ford Pinto engine

The Ford Taunus V4 engine is a 60° V4 piston engine with one balance shaft, introduced by Ford Motor Company in Germany in 1962. The German V4 was built in the Cologne plant and powered the Ford Taunus and German versions of the Consul, Capri, and Transit.

== Design ==
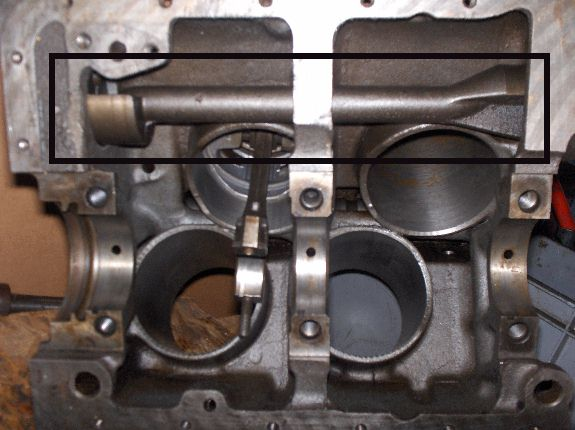
Balance shaft

In common with other V4 and V6 engines, but unlike longer V engines with more cylinders, the connecting rods do not share a crankpin on the crankshaft.

The V4 was later expanded into the Ford Cologne V6 engine that was used in the Ford Capri, Ford Taunus, Ford Cortina, Ford Consul, Ford Granada, Ford Sierra, Ford Scorpio, Ford Ranger, Ford Explorer, Ford Mustang, Mercury Capri, and many other cars. The V4 engine was also used in industrial applications: pumps, electrical generators, agricultural machinery and snowcats. In automobiles, the Taunus V4 was replaced by the Ford OHC/Pinto engine.

The V4 engine was originally designed by Ford for a new entry-level compact car intended for the US market to be called the Ford "Cardinal", which eventually evolved into the Taunus 12m P4. Ford abandoned the "Cardinal" project and instead built the Ford Falcon for North America, then sought other uses for the V4 engine. Ford bought several Saab 96s for early testing, and eventually sold the cars back to Saab with the V4 engines in them. Saab tested the V4s at their Trollhättan test track, which led Saab to acquire the V4 engine for their 95, 96, and 97 (Sonett) introduced in August 1966 (1967 production model). The V4 engine eliminated the need to mix oil with the fuel as in the two-cycle Saab "Shrike" engine, and produced better low end torque. Saab dealers offered the first owner a "Lifetime Warranty" for the V4 for US$50.

Applications:

- Ford Taunus
- Ford Consul
- Ford Transit
- Ford Capri
- Saab 95
- Saab 96
- Saab Sonett (II-V4 and III)
- Matra 530
- Ford Mustang I

== 1.2 ==
The 1.2 L (1,183 cc) version features an 80 mm × 58.86 mm (3.150 in × 2.317 in) bore and stroke. Output was 40 hp (29.8 kW) and 80 N⋅m (59 lb⋅ft) or 45 hp (33.6 kW) and 82 N⋅m (60 lb⋅ft).

Applications:

- 1962 – 1966 Ford Taunus 12M P4
- 1967 – 1968 Ford Taunus 12M P6

== 1.3 ==
The 1.3 L (1,288 cc) version had an 84 mm × 58.86 mm (3.307 in × 2.317 in) bore and stroke. Output was 50 hp (37.3 kW) and 95 N⋅m (70 lb⋅ft) or 53 hp (39.5 kW) and 98 N⋅m (72 lb⋅ft).

Applications:

- 1966 – 1970 Ford Taunus 12M P6
- 1969 – 1972 Ford Capri (Mercury Capri)
- Ford Transit 600

== 1.5 ==
The 1.5 L (1,498 cc) V4 had a 90 mm × 58.86 mm (3.543 in × 2.317 in) bore and stroke. It produced 55 hp (41 kW) and 107 N⋅m (79 lb⋅ft), 60 hp (44.7 kW) and 114 N⋅m (84 lb⋅ft) or 65 hp (48.5 kW) and 117 N⋅m (86 lb⋅ft) at 2500 rpm.

Applications:
- 1962–1966 Ford Taunus 12M P4
- 1966–1970 Ford Taunus 12M P6
- 1966–1970 Ford Taunus 15M P6
- 1964–1967 Ford Taunus 17M P5
- 1967–1971 Ford Taunus 17M P7
- 1969–1972 Ford Capri
- Ford Transit 1000
- 1967–1980 Saab 95 and Saab 96 (European market)
- 1967–1974 Saab 95, Saab 96 and Saab Sonett (USA market)
- The 1962 "Mustang I" Concept car (tuned to 90 hp (67 kW))
- 1970s Thiokol 1404 Imp snowcat

== 1.7 ==
The 1.7 L (1,699 cc) V4 had a 90 mm × 66.8 mm (3.54 in × 2.63 in) bore and stroke. It produced 65 hp (48.5 kW) and 129 N⋅m (95 lb⋅ft), 70 hp (52.2 kW) and 137 N⋅m (101 lb⋅ft) or 75 hp (56 kW) and 130 N⋅m (96 lb⋅ft).

Applications:
- 1966–1970 Ford Taunus 12M P6
- 1966–1970 Ford Taunus 15M P6
- 1964–1967 Ford Taunus 17M P5
- 1967–1971 Ford Taunus 17M P7
- 1965–1972 Ford Transit Mark I
- 1967–1972 Matra 530
- 1969–1972 Ford Capri
- 1972–1975 Ford Consul (German version)
- 1975–1981 Ford Granada (German version)
- 1971–1974 Saab 95, Saab 96 and Saab Sonett, low compression version with 65 hp (48 kW) (same as its contemporary 1500 cc 95/96) for USA market

Some DKW Munga, a Jeep-like vehicle used by the German army, were retrofitted with the Taunus V4 to replace its original two-stroke engine.

Since the Saab 96 was used for rallying it was also tuned. In the rally versions it was bored and stroked to 1.8 and 1.9 L (1,815 and 1,933 cc) giving around 150 hp (112 kW) in the naturally aspirated version and 200 hp (149 kW) DIN at 7000 rpm in the Saab 96 RC Turbo version, doing 0 to 100 km/h (62 mph) in five seconds. SAAB also tuned the engine to 240 hp (179 kW).

== See also ==
- Ford Essex V4 engine
- Ford Cologne V6 engine
