= Ford Taunus P6 =

Ford Taunus 12M (1966–1967) Ford 12M (1967–1970) Ford Taunus 15M (1966–1967) Ford 15M (1967–1970)
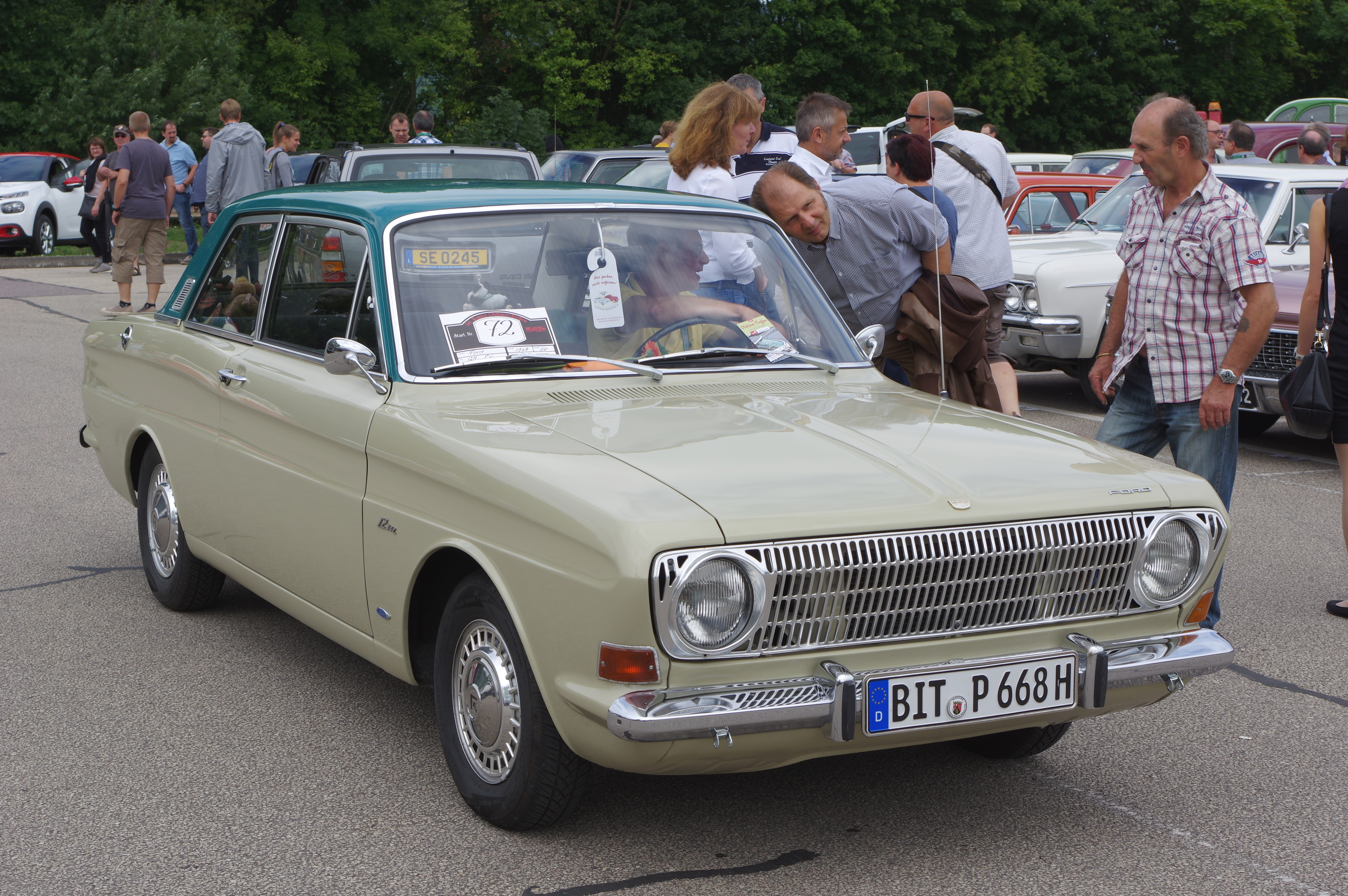

Overview
- Manufacturer: Ford Germany
- Also called: Ford Taunus P6
- Production: 1966–1970
- Assembly: Germany: Cologne-Niehl; Belgium: Genk

Body and chassis
- Class: Large family car (D)
- Body style: 2 or 4-door saloon 3-door “Turnier” estate car 2-door coupé

Powertrain
- Engine: 1183 cc V4 cylinder water-cooled (1967–1968); 1305 cc V4 cylinder water-cooled 1498 cc V4 cylinder water-cooled 1699 cc V4 cylinder water-cooled
- Transmission: 4-speed column mounted all-synchromesh manual central floor-mounted lever available from February 1968

Dimensions
- Wheelbase: 2,527 mm (99.5 in)
- Length: 4,389 mm (172.8 in)
- Width: 1,603 mm (63.1 in)
- Height: 1,385 mm (54.5 in)/1,400 mm (55.1 in)/1,425 mm (56.1 in) coupé/saloon/kombi
- Curb weight: 845–925 kg (1,863–2,039 lb)

Chronology
- Predecessor: Ford Taunus 12M P4
- Successor: Ford Taunus TC

The Ford Taunus 12 M is a range of large family saloons that were produced by Ford Germany between 1966 and 1970. There were two different engine sizes in the 12M. Two larger engines were available in the otherwise very similar Ford Taunus 15 M. From the outside the 15M was differentiated by its grille and rectangular headlights from the 12M which had round front lights. A complicating feature was the availability, at extra cost, of one of the larger engines from the 15M in the 12M.

== History ==
It was first shown in September 1966. In August 1967 the model's first and most significant facelift was marked by the removal of the “Taunus” name, and after this the cars were known simply as the Ford 12 M and the Ford 15 M.

The Taunus 12M name had been applied to the car's predecessor and the 15M name had also been used until 1959 for an earlier model. This is why the 12M and 15M models introduced in 1966 are usually identified, in retrospect, as the Ford Taunus P6. It was the sixth newly designed German Ford to be launched after the war and for this reason it was from inception known within the company as Ford Project 6 (P6) or the Ford (Taunus) P6.

Between September 1966 and August 1970 when it was replaced 668,187 Ford (Taunus) P6s were produced. This was uncannily close to the 672,695 units of the predecessor model produced between 1962 and 1966. The Taunus P6 used different names for different engine sized cars, and it is recorded that approximately 385,000 of those produced were the (mostly smaller-engined) 12Ms while the larger-engined 15Ms accounted for approximately 285,000.

== Evolutionary design ==
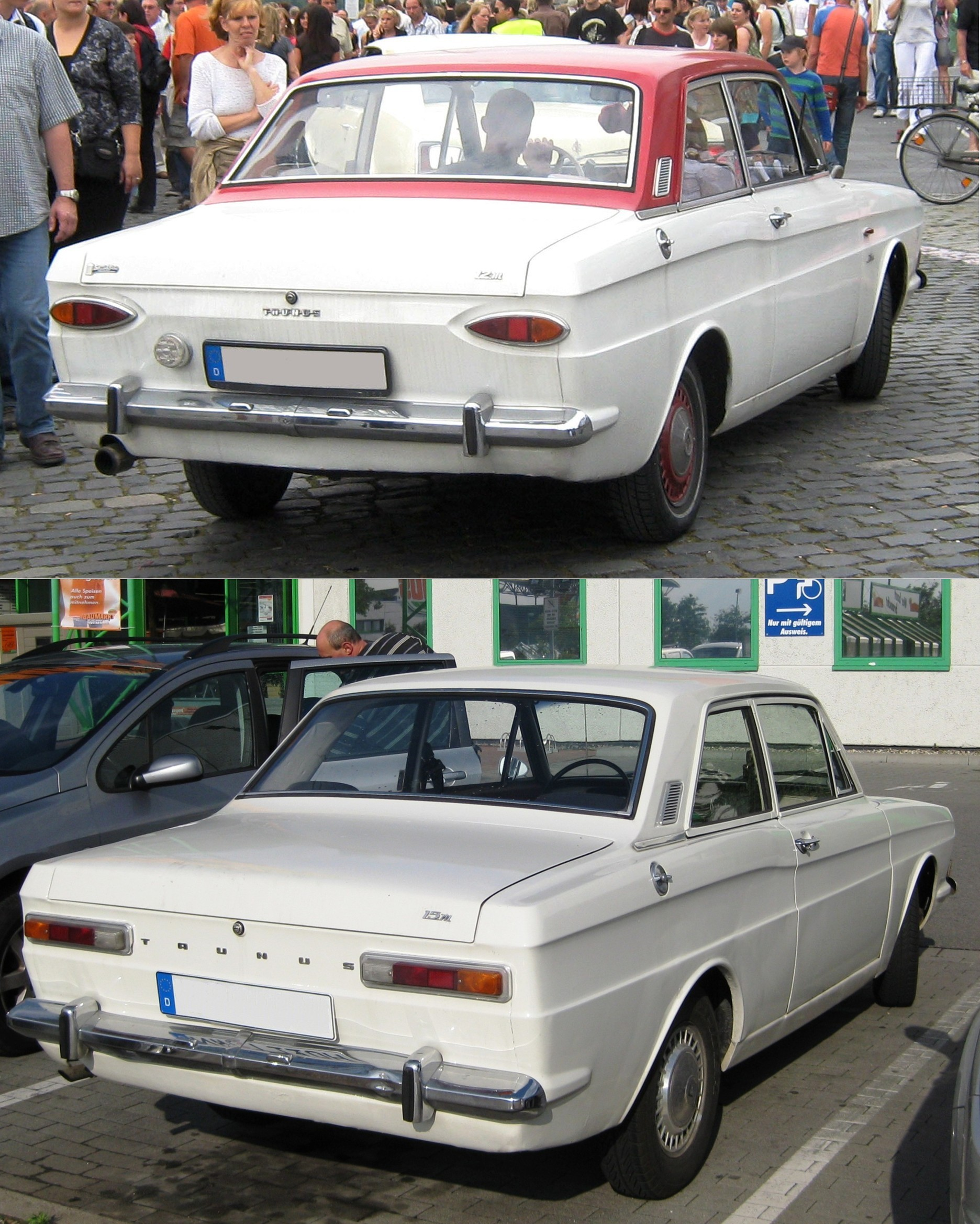
The rear light clusters on the 12M took the form of an extended lozenge. The rear light clusters on the 15M were rectangular.

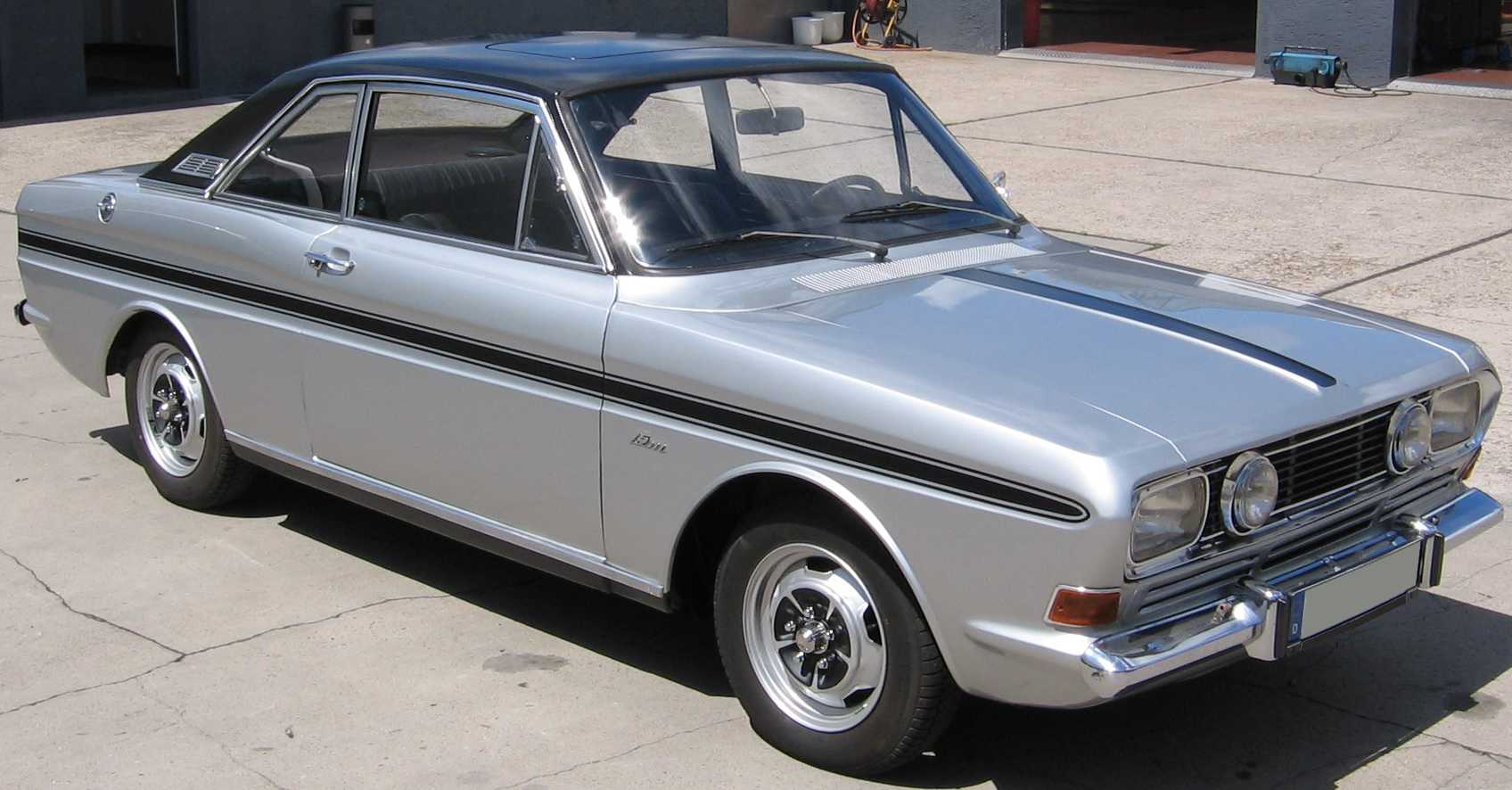
The Ford 15M Rallye Sport (RS), especially in its coupe form, acquired something approaching cult status among a determined body of enthusiasts.

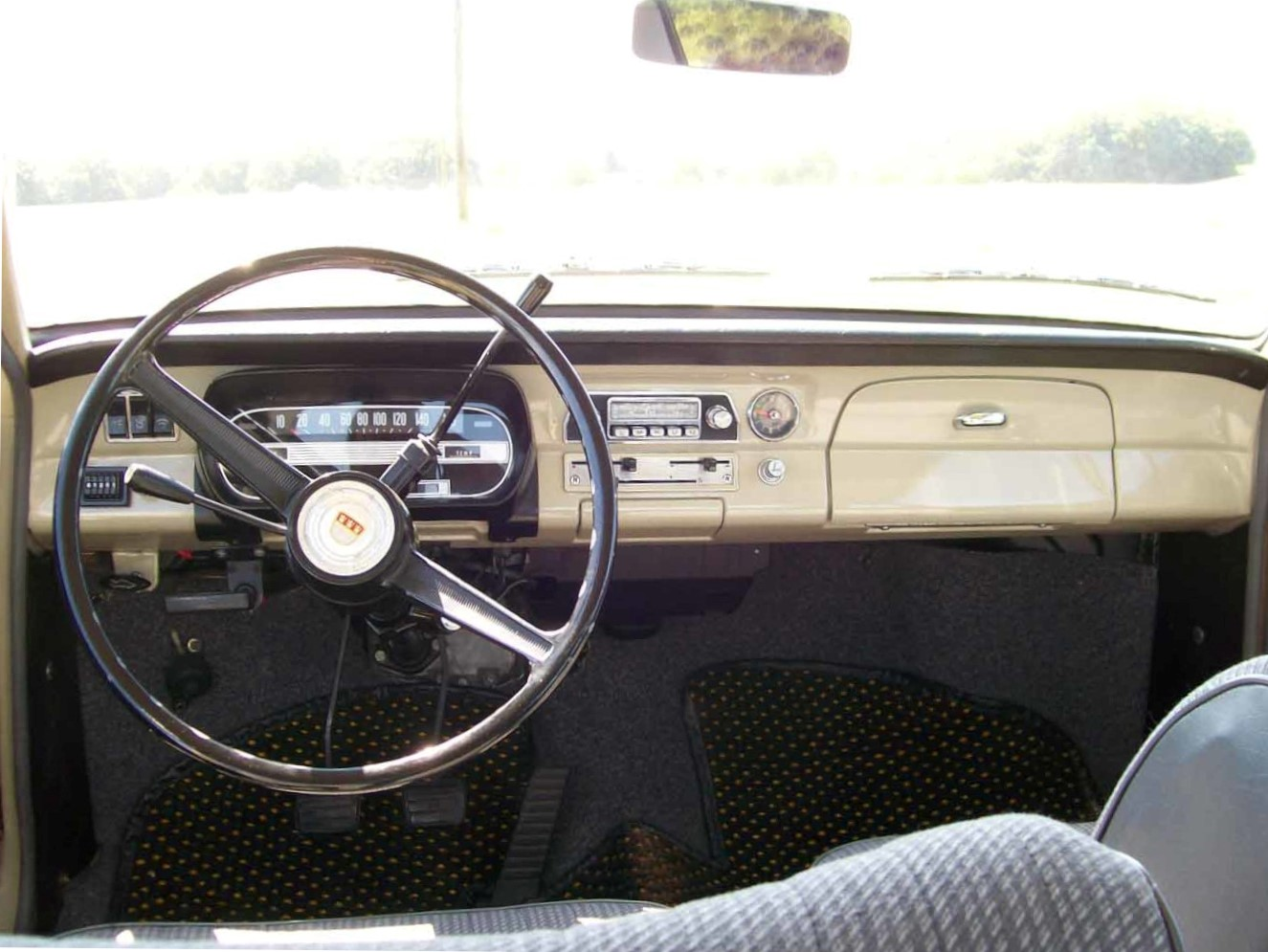
Ford 12M: what the driver saw in 1967.

The Ford Taunus P6 inherited its wheelbase from the previous model but the new body was nevertheless longer and wider, though lower. This reflected the design trends evident throughout western Europe at the time. The car also inherited the V4 engine and front-wheel drive configuration which in 1960 had marked out its predecessor as an innovator. However, the P6 came with a choice of four different engine sizes whereas P4 buyers had been obliged to choose between just two.

The 12M and 15M shared the same body, but the front grille and headlamp treatments differed as did the rear light clusters. The rear light clusters on the 12M, reminiscent of those of the previous model, took the form of an extended lozenge. The rear light clusters on the 15M were rectangular.

=== Engines ===
As on the previous Taunus 12M, the engine was front-mounted and drove the front wheels. In France and Britain this layout was beginning to gain wider acceptance thanks to cars such as the Peugeot 204 and the Morris 1100, but in Germany, apart from pioneering models from the by now relatively low volume Auto Union brands that had introduced front wheel drive in the 1930s and applied it ever since, the Ford Taunus 12M/15M was still regarded as idiosyncratic in using this configuration.

Between 1967 and 1968 the entry level Ford Taunus 12M was offered with the 1183 cm³ V4 engine that had powered its predecessor and for which a maximum power output of 45 PS/hp at 5,000 rpm was claimed.

Most 12Ms were sold with a newly introduced 1305 cm³ V4 version of the same engine, but bored out by an additional 4 mm (0.2 in). This unit was offered at launch and throughout the model life. Two different versions promised different levels of power, at either 50 or 53 PS/hp. The more powerful of these two was only offered between 1967 and 1968. The two engines were designated as “LC” and “HC” engines, which was short for “Low Compression” and “High Compression”. The oil companies were at the time introducing to German motorists “super” grade higher octane fuels at correspondingly higher prices, which encouraged car manufacturers to offer improved performance versions of cars using higher compression ratios than had hitherto been usual.

The next engine up, available as an optional extra on the 12M, and the standard engine on the 15M, was of 1498 cc. It shared the same 58.86 mm (2.3 in) stroke length of both the smaller engines fitted in the 12M, but for this application the bore was increased to 90 mm (3.5 in).

In 1967, a year after the model's introduction, a 1699 cc engine became available for the faster Ford 15Ms. This larger V4 engine had first appeared in 1964 in the larger Ford Taunus 17M. Unlike the less powerful units used in most 12Ms and 15Ms, these 1699 cc units were available only with the relatively high 9:1 compression ration, and all required to be fuelled with “super” grade high octane petrol/gasoline.

=== Body ===
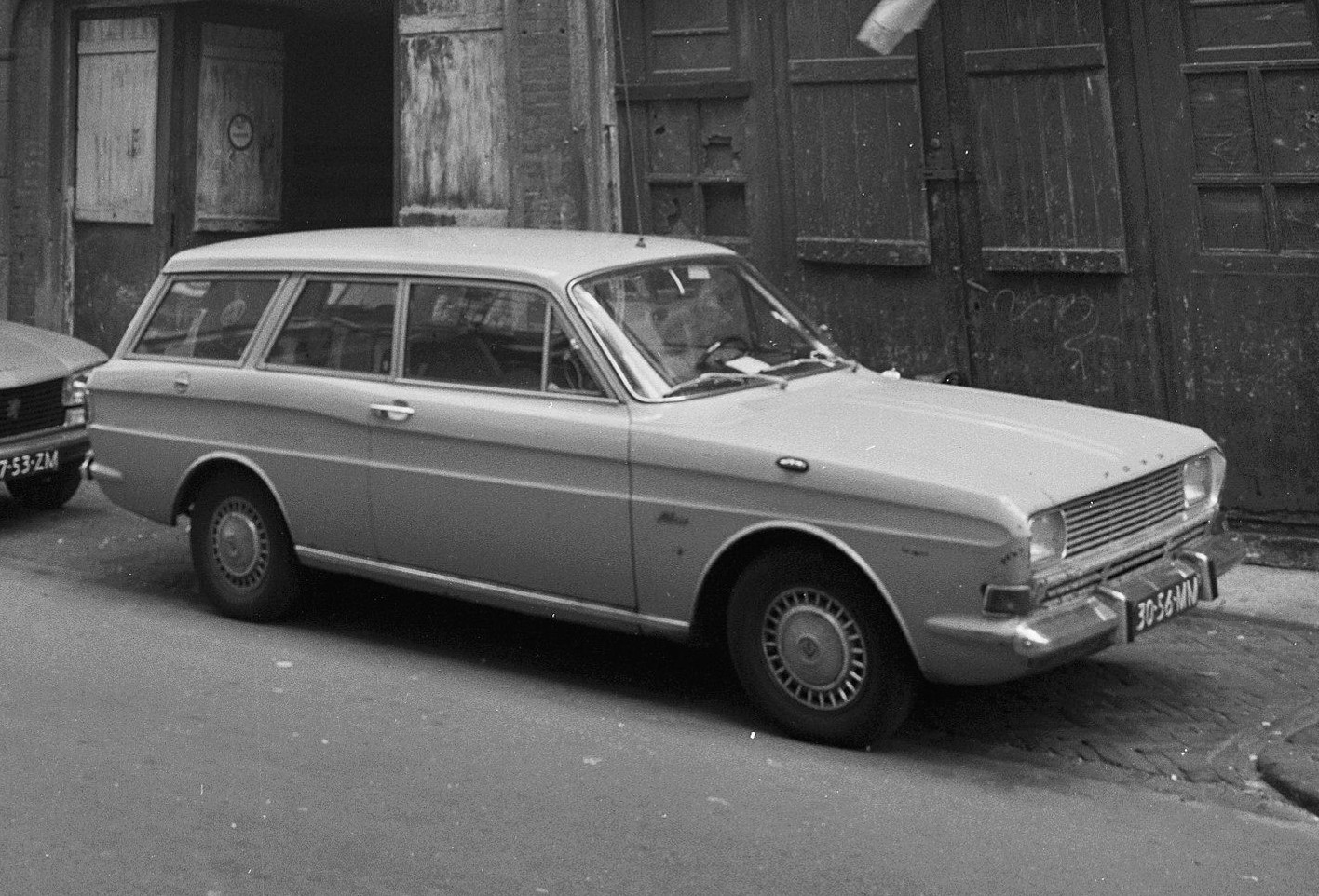
A P6 15m Turnier

The body was an all-steel monocoque structure, following what had by now become a universal pattern among the larger European automakers. The choices were broadly the same as for the previous model: Most buyers chose between the two-door and four-door saloon. A three-door station wagon ("Turnier") was also produced as was a two-door coupé, similar to the two-door saloon up to waist level, but with a shortened roof line and an increased rake for the back window, restricting severely the available headroom for those sitting in the back of the car. But there was an absentee: the P6 was the first post war Ford Taunus design for which the company offered no coach-built cabriolet version.

A feature of the body that was loudly proclaimed in Ford's advertising was its interior roominess, reflected in its generous exterior dimensions. The car was marketed and, with its less powerful versions, priced, squarely against the Volkswagen and the Opel Kadett. Opel had noticed Fords getting larger, and the new Kadett B which appeared in 1965 was 100–200 mm (3.9–7.9 in) longer (depending on body type) than the Kadett A. However, the Ford (Taunus) P6 which appeared in 1966 was 200–300 mm (7.9–11.8 in) longer even than the new Kadett.

=== Running gear ===
In most important respects, the underpinnings of Taunus P6 followed those of the previous model. A four-speed all-synchromesh manual gear box, which in the previous model had been an option, was now a standard feature, however. The gear box was controlled with a column-mounted lever, which was by now mainstream in Germany. However, from February 1968 it became possible, at extra cost, to specify a floor-mounted gear change lever between the (for these models) individual front seats. For the range topping Ford Taunus 15M RS introduced in March 1968 the floor-mounted gear change was a standard feature.

Also inherited from the previous model was the combination of disc brakes at the front and drum brakes at the rear. September 1967 saw the introduction of twin braking circuits as an additional safety feature, and in February 1968 servo-assistance for the braking system was introduced as an option on most models and included in the price for the more expensive versions of the car.

The front suspension geometry was developed from that of the Ford P4 and again incorporated MacPherson struts which combined with the class leading width of the car's 1,321 mm (52.0 in) track encouraged the manufacturer to promote the car's handling and cornering qualities. Telescopic dampers also improved the suspension of the wheels at the back of the car where the steel beam axle and the semi-elliptical leaf springs would have been familiar to drivers of earlier Taunus models.

=== Facelifts and upgrades ===
The Ford (Taunus) P6 seems to have undergone a far more extensive collection of upgrades during its four years in production than earlier Ford Taunus models. This may well have reflected the increasing competitiveness of the German auto-market which grew considerably, though not without reversals, through the 1960s.

The first and most extensive facelift came after just a year. Advertising of the time highlights a long list of improvements covering matters such as instrumentation and upholstery, although many of these, with the benefit of five decades of hindsight, appear very trivial. Following the annual summer vacation shut-down the cars that came off the production line from September 1967 nevertheless appeared with restyled grilles and dashboards. Many mainstream cars had by now accumulated long lists of optional extras, and on the Taunus P6 there was a resorting of which items of extra equipment came at extra cost and which were included in the price of the various versions of the car. The “Taunus” name was removed: from now on the Ford Taunus 12M was sold as the Ford 12M, and the name of the 15M was similarly diminished.

At this point the 6 volt electrical system was upgraded to a (since 1966 available as an optional extra) 12 volt system, reflecting the progressively greater demands placed upon the electrical systems from the growing complexity of componentry which had already persuaded most of the Ford's competitors to take this step many years earlier. Though it probably figured in Ford's thinking that, except on cars exported to the US, Volkswagen themselves continued to offer some models with only 6-volt electrical systems until 1972.

The upgraded cars for September 1967 also featured fuels tanks enlarged from 38 litres to 45 litres, which will presumably have marginally reduced luggage capacity, since the fuel tank was positioned on the right side of the boot/trunk, under the rear right-hand wing. The increase in fuel tank size applied to the saloons and the coupés but was not extended to the “Turnier” station wagon versions of the cars,

The engine cooling system was also modified for the September 1967 upgrade, and no longer incorporated an expansion tank. Autumn 1967 also saw the unveiling of the Ford 15M Rallye Sport generally referred to as the 15M RS. This model, especially in its coupe form, quickly acquired something approaching cult status among a determined body of enthusiasts. However, the 15M RS was itself upgraded in the Spring of 1968, which was when a floor-mounted gear change became standard equipment on this model.

Subsequent facelifts seem to have been restricted to rearranging the number of dials on the dashboard and reconfiguring the options list.

=== Commercial ===
In a static market the P6's achievement in matching its predecessor's annual volumes would have been counted a success, but the German auto-market was growing at this time. After 1962 small passenger car makers in Germany had to confront not merely the Volkswagen, but also the Opel Kadett. Between 1966 and 1970 Ford produced 668,187 of their P6 model, which equated to a rate of approximately 167,000 cars per year. Between 1965 and 1973 Opel produced 2,691,300 Opel Kadett Bs which equated to a rate of approximately 336,500 cars per year. Both cars were comfortably outsold on the domestic market by the Volkswagen Beetle according to the official statistics published monthly by Auto, Motor und Sport, and at this stage the Beetle still appeared unstoppable in key export markets.

=== Replacement ===
The Ford (Taunus) P6 failed to keep pace with the growth in the German auto-market which appears to have contributed to a major rethink. In 1970 Ford ceased to manufacture front-wheel drive cars, and would stick to the tried and tested and (it was said at the time) cheaper and simpler rear wheel drive configuration until the arrival in 1976 of the Ford Fiesta.

The 12M/15M was effectively replaced by two models, one of them smaller and one of them a little larger. The car having by now grown so much larger than principal domestic market competitors, no attempt was made, when replacing it, to persist with a Taunus in the small car class. Instead, Ford adapted the British Ford Escort design for production, from 1970, at a purpose built plant at Saarlouis. The Escort of this time succeeded instantly in Britain as a worthy successor to the smaller Ford Anglia. In Germany it was substantially smaller than any Ford offered in recent years, and it faced the market dominance of Opel and Volkswagen. The 1968 Escort offered cramped cabin space to challenge the Volkswagen owner's experiences, but without the Volkswagen's compensating virtues, and the Escort would have to wait until the launch of its next generation before it would begin to win a reasonable level of market acceptance in Germany.

At the upper end of the range the P6's replacement fared better at once, as the Taunus name returned and the Ford (Taunus) P6 was replaced by the rearwheel drive Ford Taunus TC. This shared the basic footprint and simplified architecture (though not at this stage most of its engines) with the British Ford Cortina Mark III. The Taunus TC would sell strongly against Opel’s Ascona, and was also helped in shared European export markets by the Cortina's supply problems resulting from lengthy strikes at Dagenham. The Taunus TC was produced at an annualised rate well ahead of the rates achieved by the Taunus P6.
