= Ford Taunus P5 =

Ford Taunus 17M Ford Taunus 20M
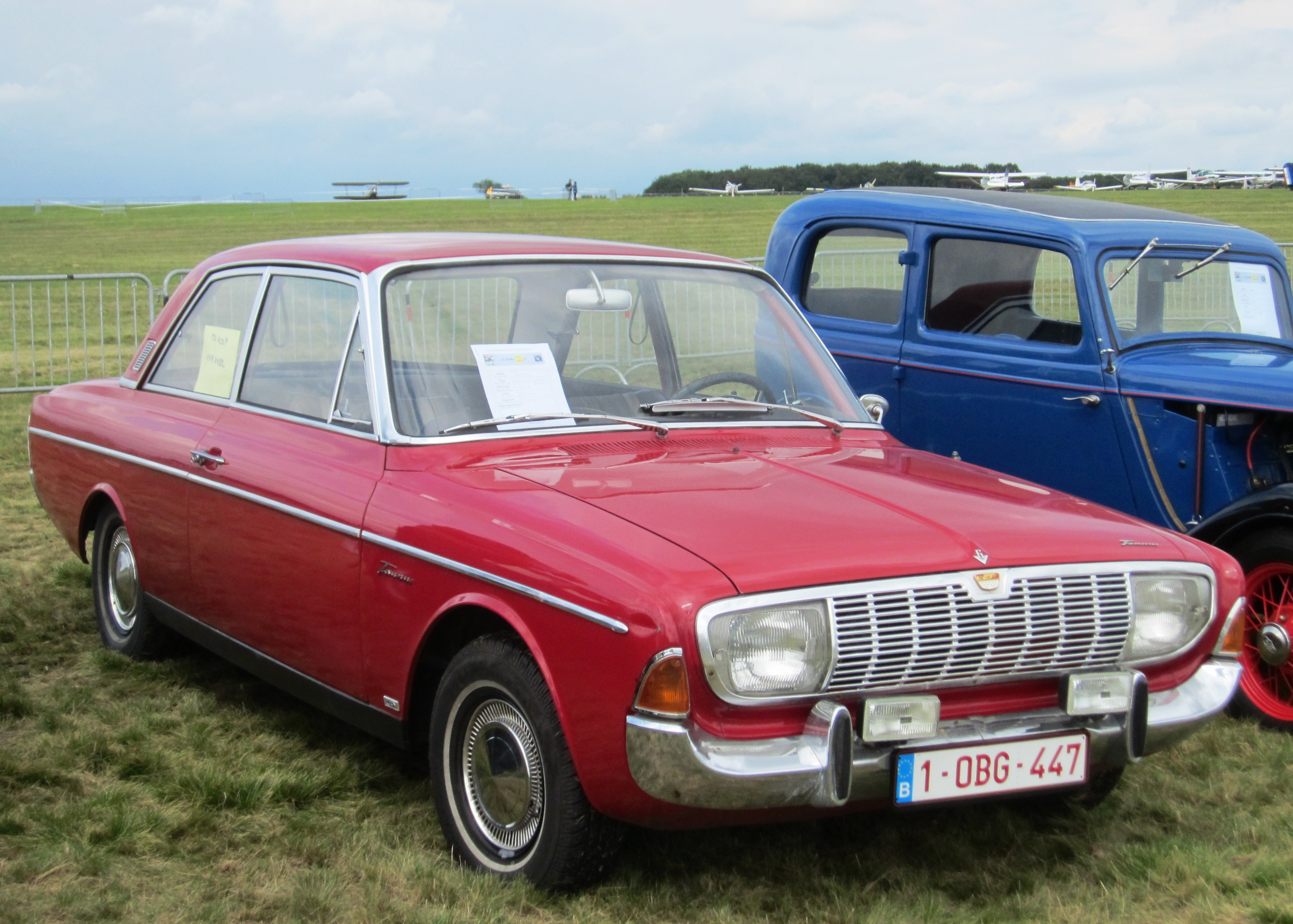

Overview
- Manufacturer: Ford Germany
- Also called: Ford Taunus P5
- Production: September 1964 – August 1967
- Assembly: Germany: Cologne-Niehl; Belgium: Genk; Portugal: Azambuja

Body and chassis
- Class: Executive car (E)
- Body style: 2-door or 4-door saloon 3-door or 5-door “Kombi” estate car 2-door coupé 2-door coach-built (Karl Deutsch) cabriolet

Powertrain
- Engine: 1498 cc V4 cylinder water-cooled 1699 cc V4 cylinder water-cooled 1998 cc V6 cylinder water-cooled
- Transmission: 3- or 4-speed all-synchromesh manual with column-mounted gear change lever 3-speed "Taunomatic" automatic (optional from 1966)

Dimensions
- Wheelbase: 2,705 mm (106.5 in)
- Length: 4,585 mm (180.5 in)
- Width: 1,715 mm (67.5 in)
- Height: 1,480–1,500 mm (58.3–59.1 in)
- Curb weight: 965–1,150 kg (2,127–2,535 lb)

Chronology
- Predecessor: Ford Taunus 17M P3
- Successor: Ford 17M/20M P7

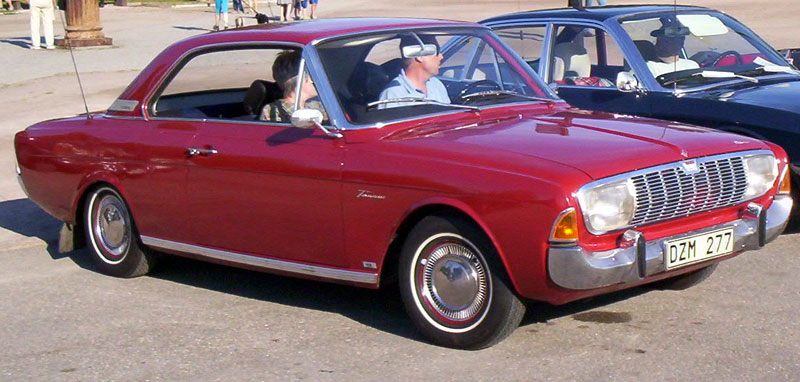
1966 Ford Taunus 20M TS Hardtop

The Ford Taunus 17M is a middle-weight family saloon that was produced by Ford Germany between 1964 and 1967. The entire range was first presented in September 1964 and volume production of the two and four door saloons began in November 1964. The "Turnier" estate version followed in January 1965 with coupé bodied cars coming along some time later.

The Taunus 17M name had been applied to the car's predecessor and it would apply also to subsequent Ford models which is why the 17M introduced in 1964 is usually identified, in retrospect, as the Ford Taunus P5. It was the fifth newly designed German Ford to be launched after the war and for this reason it was from inception known within the company as Ford Project 5 (P5) or the Ford Taunus P5.

The car was slightly larger in its overall exterior dimensions than its predecessor, but appeared in many respects to be a slightly toned down evolution from the more radical “Badewannetaunus” which it replaced. The big changes with the P5 were under the hood/bonnet where a broadened range of engines included, for the first time on a post-war German Ford, a V6 engine. The Ford Taunus P5, thus propelled, was West Germany's least expensive 6-cylinder-engined car, and the “Turnier” estate version could be promoted as Germany's first (and for some years only) six-cylinder estate.

== Evolutionary design ==
The Taunus P5 came as a modern monocoque three-box design, not dissimilar from its predecessor, but more conservative. The design continued with its predecessor's still unusual avoidance of round headlamps. The rear panel might have been seen as following the silhouette of a bathtub, and there were those who applied the “Wanne” (Tub) soubriquet, reminiscent of the “Badewanne” soubriquet of the P3, but the P5 appeared to be more of a committee design, which may explain why the automotive press was by now losing its previous enthusiasm for promoting a new catchy nickname for each new Ford Taunus model launched.

=== New engines ===
All the four-cylinder cars were badged as Taunus 17Ms. All the six-cylinder cars in the range were badged as Taunus 20Ms. A feature of all the engines which marked them out as "modern" was the oversquare cylinder dimensions.

The entry level Taunus 17M was fitted with the 1498 cc V4 engine first seen two years earlier in the “Cardinal” Taunus P4. The mainstream models were powered by a 1699 cc unit: this was now a newly developed V4 engine derived from the smaller 1498 cc unit with which it shared its 90 mm (3.5 in) bore, but the stroke was slightly lengthened. Claimed maximum power in 1964 for the two units was respectively 60 PS (44 kW; 59 hp) and 70 PS (51 kW; 69 hp), both at 4,500 rpm. A subsequently introduced version of the 1699 cc car came with a quoted power output of 75 PS (55 kW; 74 hp).

The Taunus P5 was the launch model for Ford's new V6 engine which was also a development from the company's V4 unit. The 1998 cc V6 version offered a claimed maximum power of 85 PS (63 kW; 84 hp) or, with a higher compression ratio, 90 PS (66 kW; 89 hp) achieved in both cases.at 5,000 rpm. Performance from the six-cylinder engine was boosted by the fitting, as standard equipment, of twin carburetters.

The P5 came with a “Startautomatik” which appears to have been a form of the automatic choke originally introduced in 1960 with the earlier 17M, but still something of a novelty in this class of car.

The least expensive of the six-cylinder 20Ms was aggressively priced at 7990 Marks. An Opel customer wishing to buy a six-cylinder car would need to find at least another 1400 Marks for the six-cylinder Kapitän-engined Opel Rekord which had been introduced in March 1964, presumably in anticipation of the arrival later in the same year of Ford's new six-cylinder Taunus.

=== Running gear ===
Power was transferred from the engine to the rear wheels via a three-speed all-synchromesh manual gear box controlled using a column-shift. A four-speed box was available as an optional extra. A three-speed fully automatic “Taunomatik” transmission, modelled closely on the North American "Fordomatic" was listed from May 1966, although it was nearly the end of 1966 before a few Taunus P5s thus equipped began to be delivered.

Front disc brakes had become a standard feature on the previous model towards the end of its production run, and the P5 carried over from the P3 the combination of front disc brakes and rear drum brakes. Servo-assistance for the brakes was standard on the top models and optional at extra cost further down the range.

The suspension followed what was becoming, especially for Fords in Europe, a conventional pattern, applying MacPherson struts at the front and a beam axle suspended on leaf springs at the back. The track was wider than on the previous models which a reporter at the time wrote was a cause of the P5's improved handling.

The electrical system was a six-volt one, which by now was seen as old fashioned. 12 V was introduced with the 1967 model.

=== Bodies ===
The car came with the same body options as before. Most customers chose the two- or four-door saloon. A “Turnier” estate was also offered with three or (for the first time on a Taunus) five doors. The Hardtop-Coupé which appeared only in 1966 was virtually indistinguishable from the two-door saloon up to the car's waist-level, but a shortened roof line and an increased rake for the rear-window ensured that the price of the coupé's elegance was paid by rear seat passengers in terms of severely restricted head room. As before there was also a 2-door coach-built (Karl Deutsch) cabriolet conversion, but few of these were made and the cabriolets appear to have been disproportionately expensive.

Inside all the cars came with a bench seat at the front and at the back as standard apart from the top-of-the-line Taunus 20M TS which included individual front seats as standard. Individual seats were available at extra cost on the less exalted models, as part of a (by the standards of the time) long list of optional extras. The boot/trunk could be locked from the outside, and when this was done the adjacent fuel filler flap was locked automatically at the same time.

=== Commercial ===
The Ford Taunus P5 was reasonably successful. The company produced 710,059 between 1964 and 1967.

Nevertheless, the market was also growing and sales of the car's principal competitor, the Opel Rekord, were moving ahead faster, with the Opel Rekord C the first of the two Opel Rekord versions that would each sell more than a million units. Unusually for a German-designed Ford at the time, the P5 was produced in right hand drive in South Africa and Southern Rhodesia.

=== Replacement ===
The Taunus P5 was replaced in 1967 by the Ford 17M/20M P7.

The Taunus P7 was considered blandly styled and sales disappointed. Ford found themselves obliged to rush out a heavily upgraded version in 1968. In that context, the Taunus P5 would be remembered as a greater commercial success than it may have appeared at the time.
