= Karl Deutsch GmbH =

German business

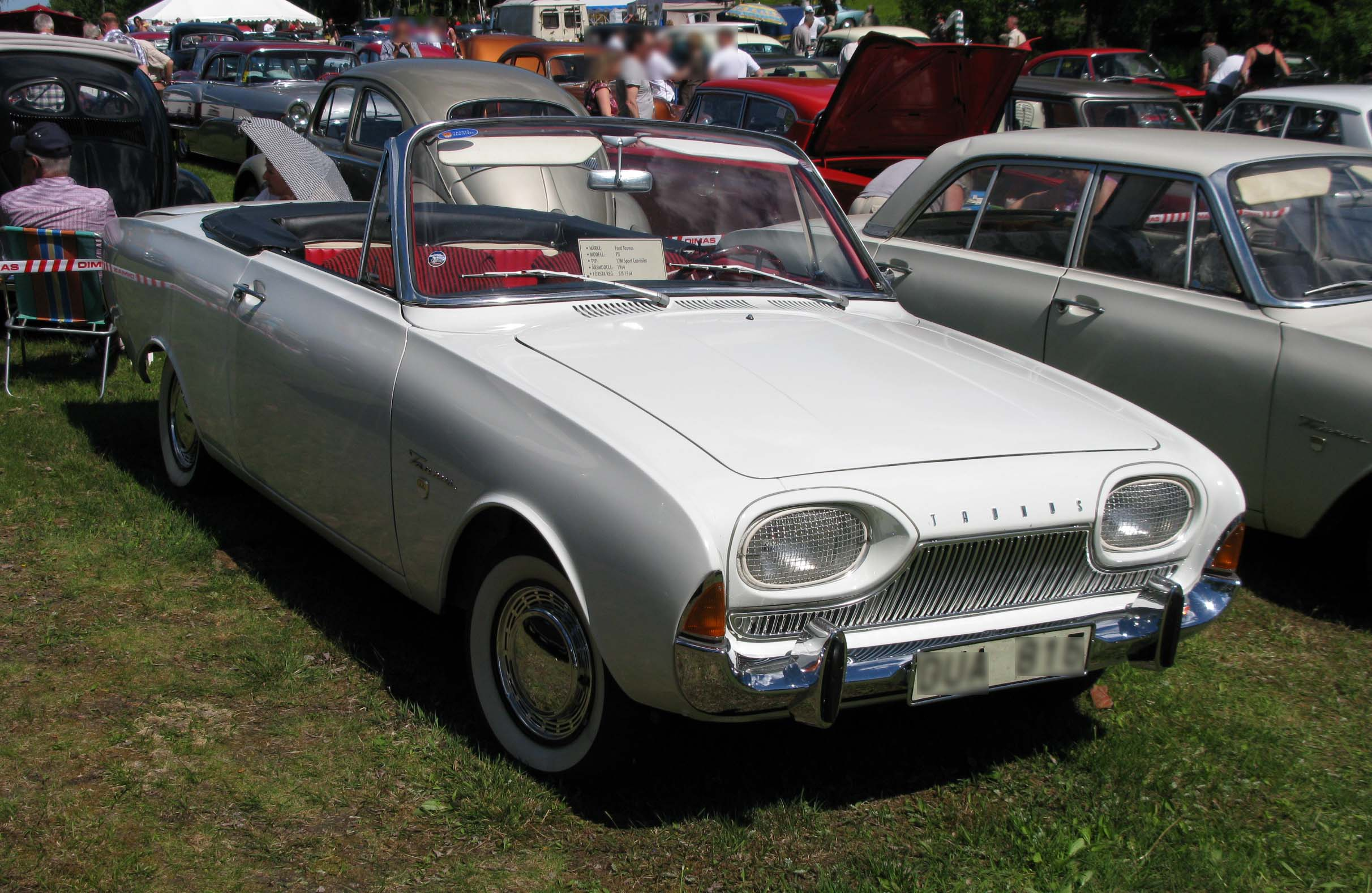
Karl Deutsch cabriolet conversion of a Ford Taunus P3.

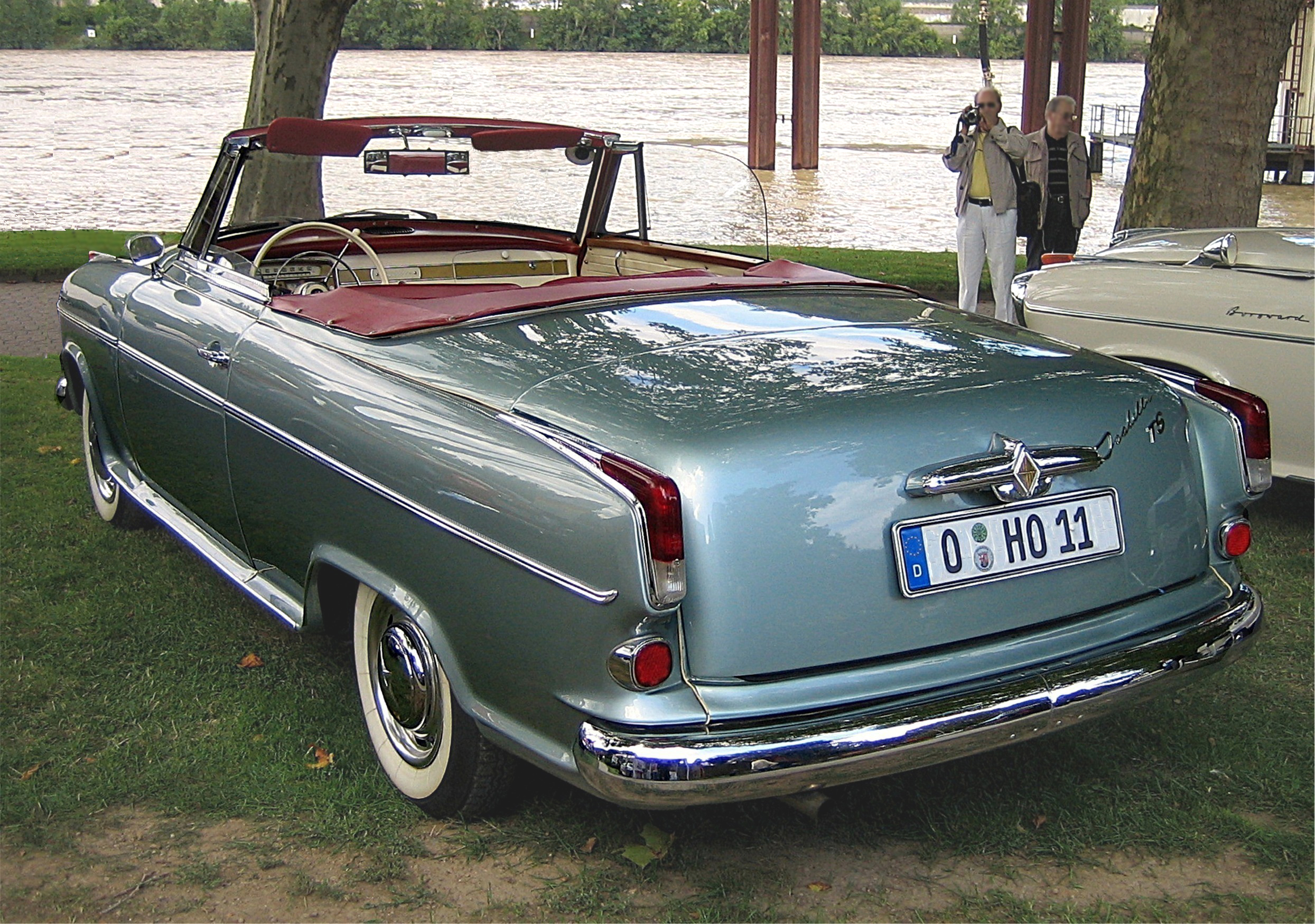
Karl Deutsch cabriolet conversion of a Borgward Isabella TS.

Karl Deutsch GmbH was a coach building firm known, in its later years, for converting mainstream motor cars into cabriolets. The business was located in Köln-Braunsfeld, a district on the west side of what today would be defined as central Cologne.

== History ==
In 1913 Karl Deutsch acquired the wheel-making business of J. W. Utermöhle GmbH. In 1916 Deutsch changed the name of the firm to Karl Deutsch GmbH, now concentrating on the production of trailers for the army.

After the war ended the company started building car bodies to spezial order on chassis manufactured by automakers. From 1930 bodies were provided for several batches of Horch cars and the company also provided car bodies to the Cologne-based subsidiary of Citroën. In 1929 Mayor Adenauer made available a 170,000 square meter site in the Cologne district of Köln-Niehl to Ford in order that they might massively expand and relocate their German assembly operations from Berlin: in 1931 the Ford Cologne plant started producing cars. Ford very soon became the most important customer for Karl Deutsch. By 1934 they were delivering to Ford 8 to 10 car bodies per day, and four years later this had increased to 30 daily. Customers also included Ford's business in the Netherlands.

After the Second World War the founder's son, Werner Deutsch, took over the business. Ford Germany remained the largest customer. However, in the mid-1960s Ford withdrew cabriolets from their model range. The company for a time continued to perform cabriolet conversions on Ford models in response to end-customer requests, and also produced cabriolet conversions for other automakers including Borgward and, following the closure of the Autenrieth coachbuilding firm, Opel.

Nevertheless, the economics of auto-production were changing, as increases in wage levels and employment taxes encouraged greater standardisation of components and sub-assemblies and the beginnings of the accelerating automation revolution that transformed manufacturing in the final decades of the twentieth century. These developments involved capital investment on a scale that the volumes available to a firm like Deutsch could never justify, and the continuing labour-intensive nature of the cabriolet conversion business created an ever-widening cost gap between the standard cars and the cabriolet versions with which, apart from the roof and some body strengthening inserts, they shared virtually all their components. The prices necessary to accommodate those cost differences became too high to be passed on to car buyers. Growing public debate about the perceived lack of secondary safety available from open topped cars further reduced demand for Deutsch cabriolet conversions. Operations came to an end in 1971.

Cabriolet conversions for English Company Crayford Engineering Ford Corsair Cabriolet (18) Ford Capri Cabriolet (32)

== Sources and further reading ==
- Werner Oswald (2005), Deutsche Autos Band 2 - 1920-1945 (in German), Stuttgart: Motorbuch Verlag, ISBN 3-613-02170-6
