= Opel cam-in-head engine =

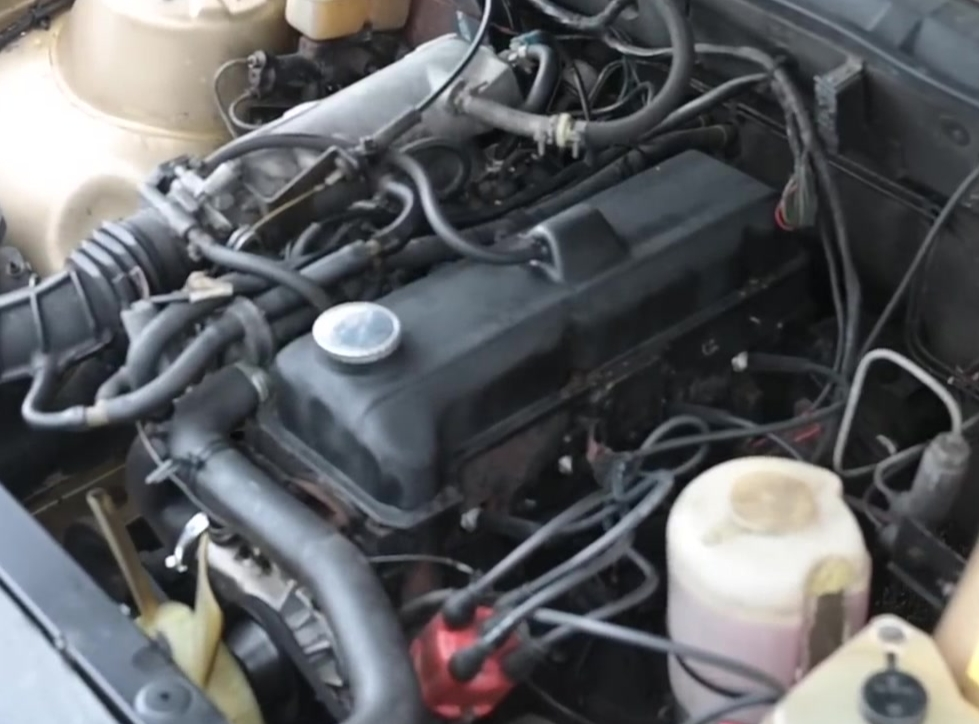
- A 4-cylinder 1,979cc (20E) fuel injected CIH engine in a 1984 Vauxhall Carlton (Opel Rekord E)

Overview
- Production: 1965 - 1998

Layout
- Configuration: Inline-4, Inline-6
- Displacement: Petrol four-cylinders: 1.5 L (1,492 cc; 91 cu in); 1.6 L (1,584 cc; 97 cu in); 1.7 L (1,698 cc; 104 cu in); 1.9 L (1,897 cc; 116 cu in); 2.0 L (1,979 cc; 121 cu in); 2.2 L (2,197 cc; 134 cu in); 2.4 L (2,410 cc; 147 cu in); Diesel four-cylinders: 2.0 L (1,998 cc; 122 cu in); 2.1 L (2,068 cc; 126 cu in); 2.3 L (2,260 cc; 138 cu in); Petrol six-cylinders: 2.2 L (2,239 cc; 137 cu in); 2.5 L (2,490 cc; 152 cu in); 2.6 L (2,594 cc; 158 cu in); 2.8 L (2,784 cc; 170 cu in); 3.0 L (2,968 cc; 181 cu in); 3.6 L (3,615 cc; 221 cu in)
- Cylinder bore: 82.5 mm (3.25 in); 85 mm (3.35 in); 87 mm (3.43 in); 88 mm (3.46 in); 88.8 mm (3.50 in); 92 mm (3.62 in); 93 mm (3.66 in); 95 mm (3.74 in)
- Piston stroke: 69.8 mm (2.75 in); 77.5 mm (3.05 in); 85 mm (3.35 in)
- Cylinder block material: Cast iron
- Cylinder head material: Cast iron Aluminium
- Valvetrain: Single cam-in-head 2 valves/cyl.; DOHC 4 valves/cyl.
- Compression ratio: 8.25:1, 9.0:1, 9.5:1

Combustion
- Turbocharger: Garrett T25 Twin-turbos (Lotus Carlton-Omega)
- Fuel system: Carburettor; Multi-port fuel injection
- Management: Bosch L-Jetronic, LE-Jetronic or Motronic
- Fuel type: Petrol; Diesel
- Oil system: Wet sump
- Cooling system: Water-cooled

Output
- Power output: 58–382 PS (43–281 kW; 57–377 hp)
- Torque output: 174–568 N⋅m (128–419 lb⋅ft)

Chronology
- Predecessor: Vauxhall Slant-4 engine; Opel Straight-6 engine (I6)
- Successor: GM Family 1 engine (1.5-1.7 L); GM Family II engine (1.8-2.4 L); GM 54-Degree V6 engine (I6)

The Opel cam-in-head engine (CIH) is a family of automobile engines built by former General Motors subsidiary Opel from 1965 until 1998, appearing extensively in Opel/Vauxhall badged cars during this period. Both four- and six-cylinder inline configurations were produced. The name derives from the location of the camshaft, which was neither cam-in-block nor a true overhead camshaft. In the CIH engine the camshaft is located in the cylinder head but sits alongside the valves rather than above them, so therefore effectively is still an overhead valve design. The valves are actuated through very short tappets and rocker arms. The engine first appeared in the Opel Rekord B in 1965, and was largely replaced in four-cylinder form by the GM Family II unit as Opel/Vauxhall's core mid-size engine in the 1980s, with the six-cylinder versions continuing until 1994 in the Omega A and Senator B. A large capacity 2.4L four-cylinder version continued until 1998.

A diesel version of the CIH was also developed. This engine debuted in the Opel Rekord D in 1972.

== Design ==
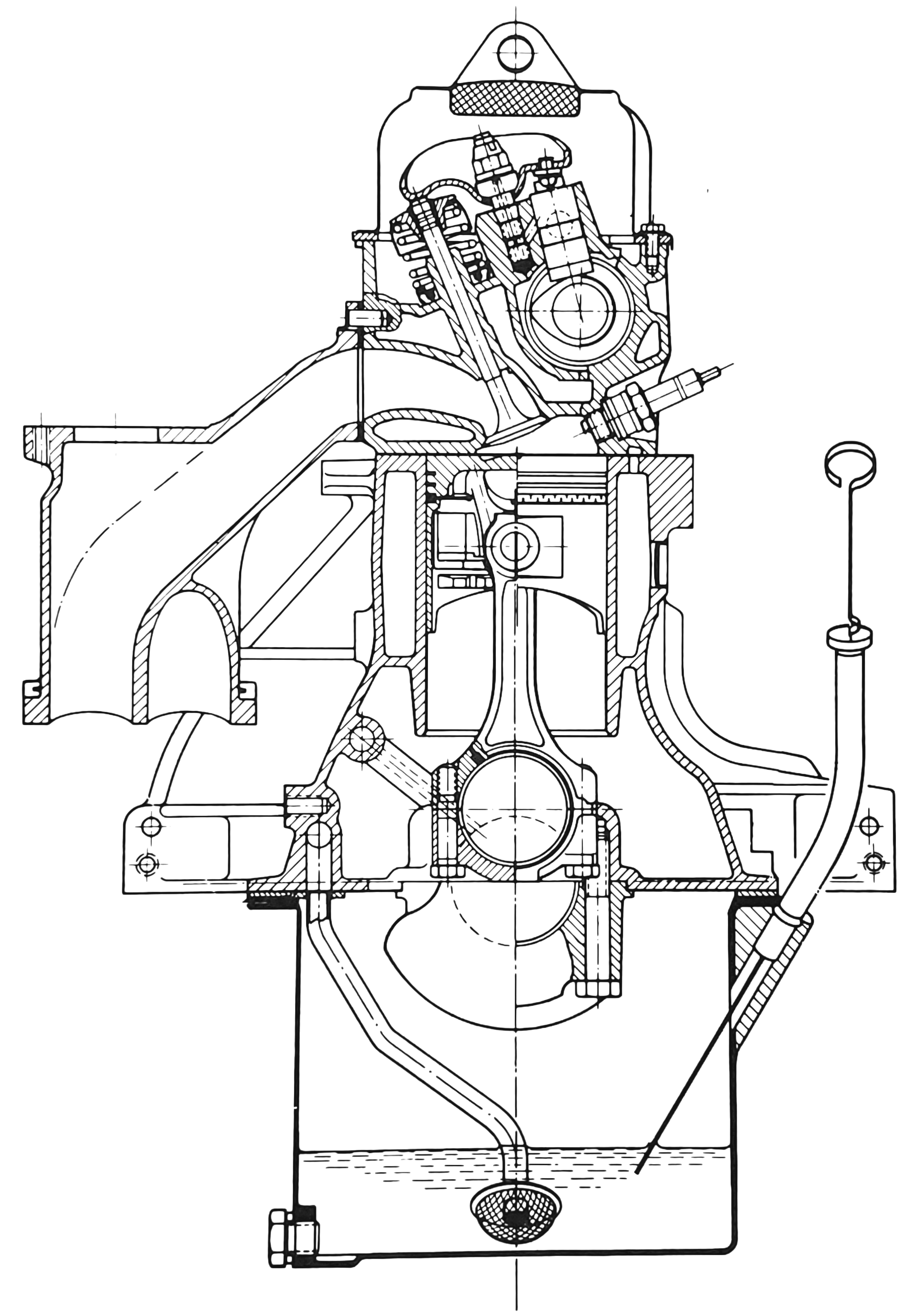
1.9L Opel CIH - front cross-section

The original design of the cam-in-head engine was done by General Motors in Detroit, Michigan.

Although the camshaft is in the cylinder head, the CIH is not a true overhead camshaft design. Rather it can be thought of as a cam-in-block engine with a greatly shortened valve drivetrain. The camshaft is driven by a roller chain. While the earliest engines use mechanical lifters, later versions use hydraulic tappets, which Opel pioneered for mass market production in the Family II unit which ultimately replaced the CIH. The cylinder head is a non-crossflow layout. This led to lowered fuel economy but was considerably cheaper to manufacture. The head and block are both made from cast iron. The CIH engine is oversquare, with the original three versions having a stroke of only 69.8 mm (2.75 in). Later engines of over two litres received longer strokes; up to 77.5 mm (3.05 in) for the 2.2 and 85 mm (3.35 in) for the 2.4 (also used for the 3.6 litre inline-six version).

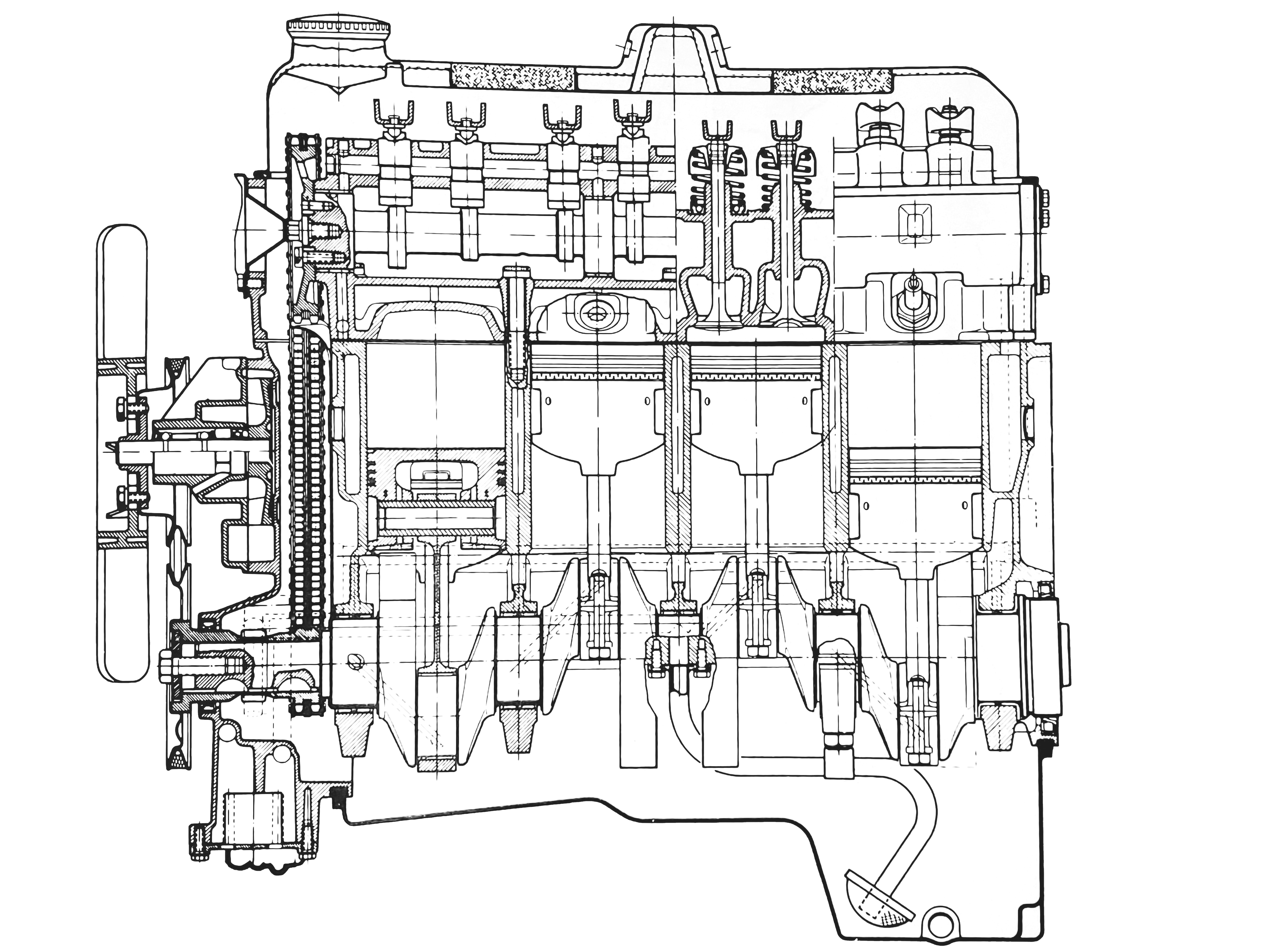
1.9L Opel CIH - side cross-section

While an improvement over a cam-in-block engine, the advantages over an OHC design were limited. For one, the lower head allowed for a correspondingly lower bonnet line. The CIH engine was expected to require less maintenance than an OHC design and was also lighter, albeit negated somewhat by the use of a cast iron head.

Unlike its smaller stablemate - the Opel OHV, the CIH was never adapted for transverse mounting (for front wheel drive applications), and is always found in rear wheel drive Opel/Vauxhall cars.

Opel developed their own crossflow head for the CIH block, and tested it in the experimental GT-2 of 1975 with the intent of installing it in the production model. In four-cylinder form, this engine reached only limited production as the Kadett GT/E's 20EH engine. The crossflow head did see mass production in six-cylinder form as the 3.0 24V in the Opel Senator B.

== Four-cylinder versions ==
=== 1.5 litre I4 ===
This is the smallest of the three original CIH engines introduced simultaneously. A 82.5 mm × 69.8 mm (3.25 in × 2.75 in) bore and stroke gives a 1.5 L (1,492 cc) displacement. As with most of Opel's engines of the 1960s and 1970s, versions optimized for low and high octane fuel were offered, with the 15N for normal and the 15S for super. Power ranged from 58 to 60 PS (43 to 44 kW) for the 15N while the rare 15S in the export-only Kadett B and Olympia A has 65 PS (48 kW) DIN at 5000 rpm. SAE output was 76 hp at 5600 rpm.

This engine was imported by Daewoo's predecessor companies GM Korea and Saehan Motors and went on to be built in South Korea by Daewoo beginning around 1983. The automobile taxation system of South Korea greatly favours engines of less than 1.5 litres displacement. It was installed in the Saehan Camina, the Saehan Gemini series, and in the Saehan/Daewoo Royale (until 1987). 1.9 and 2.0 litre versions were also built in Korea.

Applications

- August 1965 - July 1966 Opel Rekord B
- August 1966 - January 1970 Opel Rekord C
- September 1967 - 1970 Opel Kadett B 1.5 S (export only, Finland/Austria/Sweden/USA)
- September 1967 - 1970 Opel Olympia A 1.5 S (export only)
- March 1976 - 1978 Saehan Camina
- December 1977 - 1982 Saehan Gemini
- 1979 - 1988 Saehan/Daewoo Max (pickup version of Gemini/Kadett C)
- 1972 - 1982 Saehan Rekord
- 1982 - 1987 Daewoo Royale

=== 1.6 litre I4 ===
The 1.6 L (1,584 cc) version has a 85 mm (3.35 in) bore and the same 69.8 mm (2.75 in) stroke as most CIH fours. It was introduced in September 1970 with the all new Opel Manta A and then, seven weeks later, in the Opel Ascona A. As with the 1.5 litre, a 16N for lower octane fuel and a more powerful 16S for higher octane fuel were offered. Power outputs were 68 and 80 PS (50 and 59 kW) at the time of introduction, but dropped to 60 and 75 PS (44 and 55 kW) respectively in early 1975 when tighter pollution controls were introduced. From 1975 there was also a still-cleaner A16S version with 69 PS for some markets, this specific model also had a forged crank with 8 crankweights. It was replaced by a 1.6 L (1,598 cc) version of the Family II engine that appeared in the Opel Ascona C/Vauxhall Cavalier Mk II.

Applications

- September 1970 - August 1975 Opel Manta A
- October 1970 - September 1975 Opel Ascona A
- August 1975 - May 1981 Opel Manta B
- September 1975 - August 1981 Opel Ascona B
- May 1977 - August 1979 Opel Kadett C 1.6 S
- November 1975 - July 1981 Vauxhall Cavalier Mark I

=== 1.7 litre I4 ===
The 1.7 L (1,698 cc) CIH was another of the original three introduced. Bore is 88 mm (3.46 in) while stroke remains 69.8 mm (2.75 in). The 1700 was only ever available in carburetted form, for either normal or super petrol with corresponding power outputs. Power output is 60 PS (44 kW) for the original 17N, while the 17S version produces 75 PS (55 kW) DIN at 5200 rpm. Claimed SAE output for the 17S was 84 hp at 5600 rpm. The output of the 17N went up to 66 PS (49 kW) in 1969, and then back down to the original 60 after the compression was lowered in 1975.

The 17S received a new carburettor setup in 1972 when the Rekord D was introduced, and power rose to 83 PS (61 kW). In the larger Rekord, the 17S was popular in export markets like Italy and Greece where owners' costs were directly linked to engine displacement.

Applications

- August 1965 - July 1966 Opel Rekord B
- August 1966 - December 1971 Opel Rekord C
- September 1967 – 1970 Opel Kadett B 1.7 S
- August 1967 - July 1970 Opel Olympia A
- January 1972 - August 1977 Opel Rekord D
- August 1977 - 1980 Opel Rekord E
- February 1970 - December 1971 Ranger A
- January 1972 - August 1977 Ranger B
- August 1972 - 1976 Chevrolet 1700 (South Korea)

=== 1.9 litre I4 ===
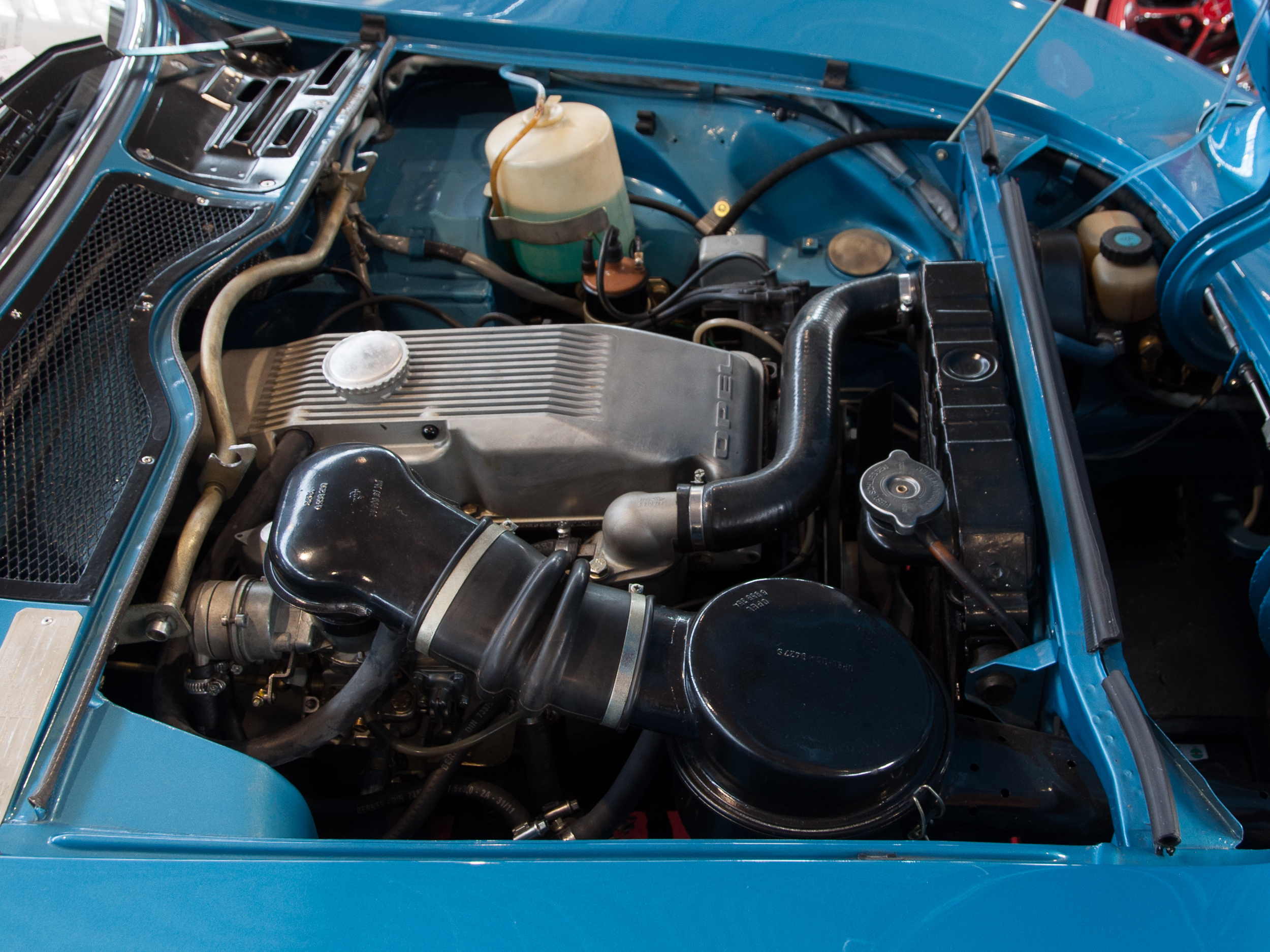
A 19S engine in a 1970 Opel GT

The 1.9 L (1,897 cc) CIH was the largest of the original three introduced. Bore is 93 mm (3.66 in) while the stroke remains 69.8 mm (2.75 in). The 1900 was available in carburetted or fuel injected forms, for either normal or super petrol with a variety of power outputs. An N version was a later addition. Output is 90 PS (66 kW) DIN at 5100 rpm for the original 19S; SAE power is 102 hp at 5400 rpm. There was also the 19HL (Hochleistung, or "high power"), introduced in 1967 for the sporty Opel Rekord Sprint and Kadett Rallye Sprint models. This version has 106 PS (78 kW), compared to 97 PS (71 kW) for the slightly more powerful 19SH only fitted to the Rekord (H meaning hydraulic valve lifters). The 19SH lost some power in 1975, down to 90 PS (66 kW) and the new 19N was introduced to replace the discontinued 17S; like the 17S it offered 75 PS (55 kW) but used cheaper gasoline and more relaxed driving characteristics. The 1900 is the most common version in the CIH family, available in the most versions and with the longest production time.

The 19E was the first of the CIH four-cylinders to receive fuel injection. It first appeared in the Manta GT/E in March 1974, with 105 PS (77 kW). There is also a low-powered Austrian market version of the 19N (the A19N) with 70 PS (51 kW) which was mostly fitted to the Opel Rekord E, and a special low emission version for the Swedish and Swiss markets called the S19S which develops 88 PS (65 kW). This specific model, along with the S16S, had a forged crank with 8 crankweights.

Applications

- August 1965 - July 1966 Opel Rekord B
- August 1966 - December 1971 Opel Rekord C
- September 1967 - July 1973 Opel Kadett B Rallye (19 S/HL)
- August 1967 - July 1970 Opel Olympia A coupé (19S)
- October 1968 - middle 1973 Opel GT
- September 1970 - August 1975 Opel Manta A
- October 1970 - September 1975 Opel Ascona A
- January 1972 - August 1977 Opel Rekord D
- August 1975 - May 1981 Opel Manta B
- September 1975 - August 1981 Opel Ascona B
- September 1975 - July 1979 Opel Kadett C GT/E (19E only)
- August 1977 - August 1982 Opel Rekord E
- February 1970 - December 1971 Ranger A
- January 1972 - August 1977 Ranger B
- May 1974 - February 1976 Holden Torana 1900 LH
- February 1976 - November 1976 Holden Torana 1900 LX
- November 1976 - March 1978 Holden Sunbird LX
- March 1978 - September 1978 Holden Sunbird UC
- 1978 - 1985 Saehan/Daewoo Rekord/Royale
- November 1975 - July 1981 Vauxhall Cavalier Mark I

=== 2.0 litre I4 ===
The 2.0 L (1,979 cc) CIH was based on the 1.9 litre version, with the bore expanded to 95 mm (3.74 in) while the stroke remained 69.8 mm (2.75 in). Unlike the earlier 1.9, the 2.0 received hydraulic tappets. Developed to counteract the diminishing outputs which resulted from stricter emissions rules, the 2.0 was available in carburetted or fuel injected forms, for either normal or super petrol with a variety of power outputs. Output of the original 20S, presented in September 1975, is 100 PS (74 kW) at 5200 - 5400 rpm. This was soon followed by the fuel injected 20E version, with 110 PS (81 kW), and the slightly more powerful 115 PS (85 kW) 20EH fitted to the Kadett 2.0 GT/E. This received the Bosch L-Jetronic system, until it was replaced by the updated LE-Jetronic towards the end of 1981. A 90 PS (66 kW) 20N version appeared in August 1977. There are also two special low-emission versions for the Swedish and Swiss markets, called the S20S and S20E, with slightly less power than their dirtier counterparts.

Applications

- September 1975 - August 1977 Opel Rekord D
- September 1977 - August 1988 Opel Manta B
- September 1977 - August 1981 Opel Ascona B
- September 1977 - July 1979 Opel Kadett C GT/E, Rallye (20E/EH)
- August 1977 - June 1986 Opel Rekord E
- 1984 - 1990 Chevrolet Rekord (South Africa)
- 1978 - 1985 Saehan/Daewoo (Rekord) Royale
- November 1975 - July 1981 Vauxhall Cavalier Mark I
- late 1978 - June 1986 Vauxhall Carlton

=== 2.2 litre I4 ===
The 2.2 CIH engine was fuel injected and was produced from 1984 through 1987. Its bore was 95mm but stroke was increased to 77.5mm. Also, the cylinder head was redesigned. It had bigger valves and intake ports were lifted. Also, hardened valve seats were added to accept unleaded fuel. Power output rose slightly: 115 PS (85 kW; 113 hp), with 182 N⋅m (134 lbf⋅ft) of torque.

It was used in the Opel Rekord E, Opel Monza A2 and Opel Senator A2.

=== 2.4 litre I4 ===
The 2.4 L (C24NE) was the final four-cylinder CIH version. Bore remained same 95mm but stroke was increased to 85mm. Power output: 125 PS (92 kW; 123 hp) / 195 N⋅m (144 lbf⋅ft). It was first used in the Omega A in the German market, while the 2.0 L Family II unit was the top spec four-cylinder engine option for the Omega in most markets outside of Germany. Its final application was in the Frontera SUV.

Applications:

- 1992-1998 Opel Frontera A
- 1988-1993 Opel Omega A

=== 400 I4 / Cosworth KAA ===
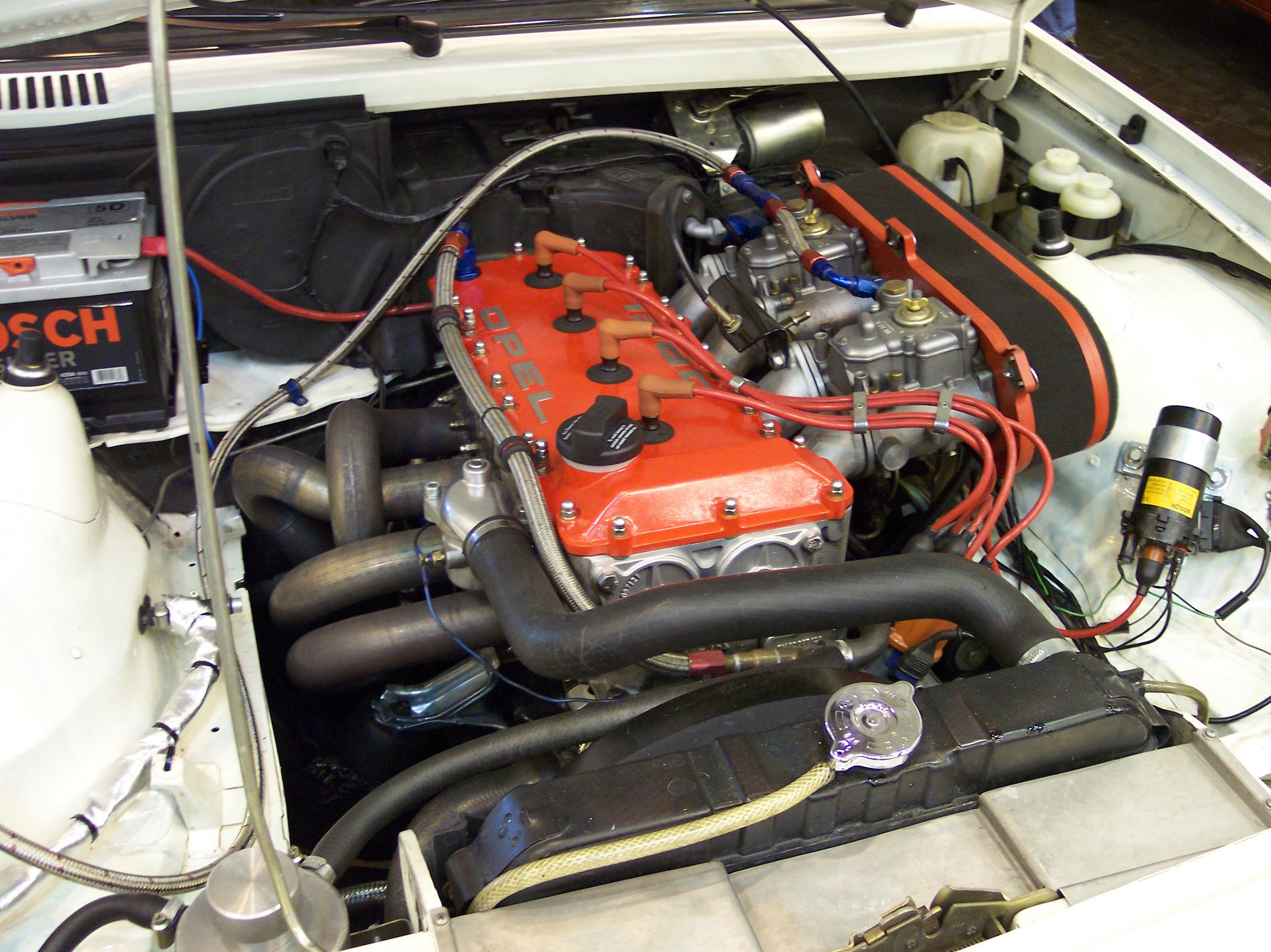
Opel Manta 400 engine

In the early 1970s Opel announced a new DOHC engine project intended to be used in Formula 2 (F2). The engine was designed in-house, and was unveiled in 1975. Homologated in Group 4 rallying, the engine suffered a series of failures, which prompted Opel to contact Cosworth engineering.

With the basic design of the engine already frozen, Cosworth's work included revising the port and camshaft shapes and extensive development work with a focus on reliability. Based on a 2.0E block with bore and stroke of 95.2 mm × 85 mm (3.7 in × 3.3 in), the engine displaced 2,420 cc (147.7 cu in). Compression was 11.5:1. Power and torque outputs were 190.2 kW (255 bhp) at 7200 rpm and 28 kg⋅m (202.5 lb⋅ft) at 5000 rpm. Air and fuel were fed by twin 48DCOE Weber carburettors, and the engine received a dry sump.

As a result of their successful work on the racing version of the engine, Cosworth was awarded the contract to build the 400 copies of the engine required to homologate the Ascona 400, and more later to homologate the Manta 400. Cosworth also consulted on the fuel injection system that replaced the carburettors on the road-going version. The detuned 16 valve engine was rated at 107.4 kW (144 bhp) at 5200 rpm and 21.4 kg⋅m (155 lb⋅ft) at 3800 rpm.

== Six-cylinder versions ==
The straight-six CIH was used in the largest Opel and Vauxhall cars from 1968 to 1993. It was succeeded by the Opel-designed 54° V6 in the mid-1990s.

Most of these engines were single cam-in-head engines with chain-driven camshafts. In the 1960s and 1970s, they generally came with carburetors, but were later fitted with Bosch fuel injection starting in 1969. Some later six-cylinder family members received true DOHC multivalve cylinder heads.

=== 2.2 litre I6 ===
This is the rarest of the inline-sixes. At only 2.2 L (2,239 cc), it shares its 82.5 mm (3.25 in) bore and 69.8 mm (2.75 in) stroke with the 1.5 litre "four". It debuted in December 1966. With 95 PS (70 kW) it had only marginally more power than the 1900S, at a substantial weight and cost penalty. It was dropped from the Rekord C following the introduction of the six-cylinder Commodore line in February 1967, and was discontinued entirely towards the end of 1968, when the 1969 models were introduced.

Applications

- December 1966 - 1967 Opel Rekord C
- February 1967 - August 1968 Opel Commodore A

=== 2.5 litre I6 ===
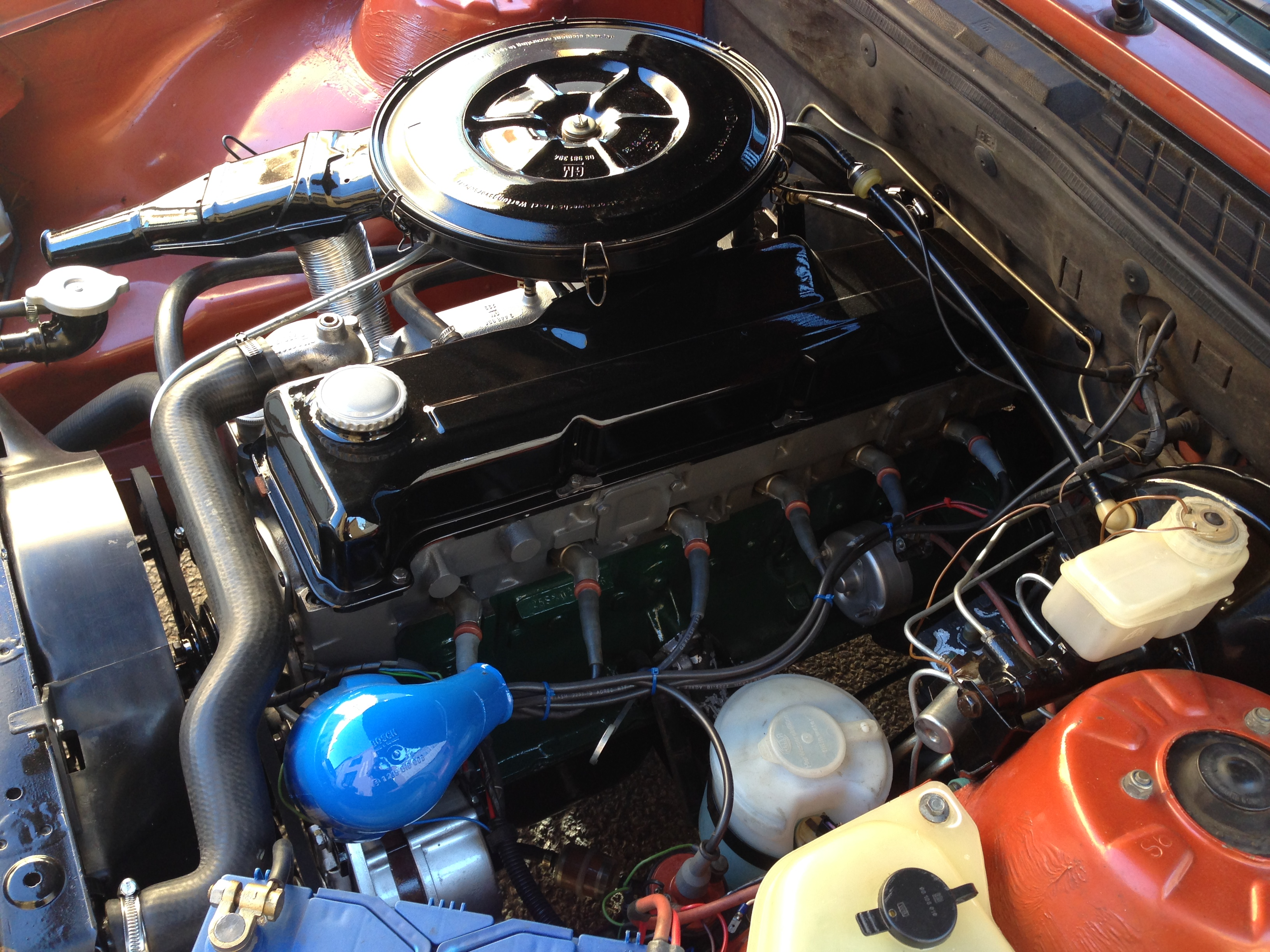
A 1980 25S engine in a Commodore C

The modern Opel straight-six line began in 1968 with the 2.5 L (2,490 cc) 25S unit used in the Opel Commodore. Still a 12-valve engine, it had a very oversquare 87 mm × 69.8 mm (3.43 in × 2.75 in) bore and stroke. The 25S, with 9.2:1 compression and a single carburettor, produces 115 PS (85 kW) and 174 N⋅m (128 lb⋅ft), while the 25H, with 9.5:1 compression and dual carbs, produces 130 PS (96 kW) and 186 N⋅m (137 lb⋅ft).

With 9.2:1 compression and Bosch D-Jetronic (Commodore A & B), later L&LE-Jetronic, injection produced 150 PS (110 kW) and 186 N⋅m (137 lb⋅ft).

Applications

- August 1968 - January 1972 Opel Commodore A
- January 1972 - July 1977 Opel Commodore B
- August 1977 - August 1982 Opel Commodore C / Vauxhall Viceroy
- January 1978 - August 1987 Opel Senator A / Vauxhall Royale/Senator
- February 1970 - December 1971 Ranger A
- January 1972 - August 1977 Ranger B

=== 2.6 litre I6 ===
At the introduction of the 24v DOHC engine in the Senator/Carlton/Omega, the 2.5 was enlarged to 2.6 litres. With a reworked 12-valve cylinder head and RAM induction it now produced 150 PS (110 kW; 148 hp). This engine was also fitted to southeast Asian export market versions of the Holden VP, VR, and VS Commodores between around 1992 and 1997. These cars were usually labelled "Opel Calais".

=== 2.8 litre I6 ===
The 2.8 was introduced in Kapitän/Admiral and Commodore model. The carburetted version can also be found in the Monza and Senator, while the second Commodore was also available with a fuel-injected version.

Single Carb 28S: 125–132 PS (92–97 kW; 123–130 hp).

Dual Carb 28H: 140–145 PS (103–107 kW; 138–143 hp).

Injection 28EC: 160–165 PS (118–121 kW; 158–163 hp).

=== 3.0 litre I6 ===
The 3.0 L (2,969 cc) version was introduced in 1977. The carburetted 30S version had 150 PS (110 kW; 148 hp), while the more popular fuel injected 30E version produced 180 PS (132 kW; 178 hp) and 248 N⋅m (183 lb⋅ft) in the Opel Monza GSE and Opel Senator 3.0E, as well as their Vauxhall-badged equivalents, the Royale and later Senator. Bore was increased to 95 mm (3.74 in), but the stroke remained at a very short 69.8 mm (2.75 in).

The 1986 Opel Omega 3000 / Vauxhall Carlton GSi introduced the latest version of the 3.0. The injected engine produced 180 PS (132 kW; 178 hp) and 240 N⋅m (177 lb⋅ft). Amongst the changes were larger valves and a switch in engine management to Bosch Motronic. This engine later found its way into the Senator and Omega 3.0i.

In 1989, a DOHC 24-valve version with a variable length intake manifold was introduced, with power increasing to 204 PS (150 kW; 201 hp) and 270 N⋅m (199 lb⋅ft).

=== 3.6 litre C36GET I6 ===
In 1990 a special version of the six cylinder appeared in the Lotus Carlton/Omega. With the 24v 3.0 L engine from the GSI as a base, displacement was increased to 3.6 L; 220.6 cu in (3,615 cc) by increasing the stroke to 85 mm (3.35 in) while keeping the bore at 95 mm (3.74 in). Lotus reportedly experimented with a variety of forced induction schemes, including paired supercharging and turbocharging and sequential turbos, before settling on two small turbos for quick spool-up. Two Garrett AiResearch T25 turbochargers and a Behr air-to-water intercooler were used. The turbos were arranged in parallel, each fed by and feeding three cylinders. The fuel injection system was customized. Apart from a reduction in compression ratio to 8.2:1, the cylinder head was otherwise unmodified. The Lotus engine produced 382 PS (377 bhp; 281 kW) at 5,200 rpm and 568 N⋅m (419 lb⋅ft) at 4,200 rpm.

== Third-party tuner versions ==
Crossflow and multi-valve cylinder heads for the CIH block were developed by a number of well-known German tuning companies such as Irmscher, Mantzel, Risse, and Steinmetz.

=== Swedentop ===
Extensive work on a revised four cylinder head with larger valves, enlarged ports, and revised camshaft profiles was done in Sweden, particularly by ENEM in Nacka. These heads and other parts were used for rallying, and the changes were later copied by Opel for factory backed cars.

=== 3.0i I6 ===
The Omega Evo had a special Irmscher version of the 24-valve engine with an uprated head and forged internals producing 230 PS (169 kW; 227 hp).

=== 3.6i I6 ===
Irmscher made a 3.6i 12v engine and fitted this 36E coded engine into the Monza E and Monza GSE models. In the UK some of these engines found their way into Vauxhall Senator Bs instead.

In late 1987 newer, more environmentally friendly versions of this engine with tuning by Irmscher were installed in versions of the Omega A/Mk3 Carlton and Senator B models. These later units, with engine codes 36NE, C36NE, and C36NEI, produced (200 PS (147 kW; 197 hp)), less than the first 207 bhp (154 kW) engines that were used to power the earlier Opel Monzas. 24-valve versions of the 3.6 were also developed.

=== 4.0i I6 ===
4.0 L 24v DOHC versions of the six cylinder CIH were made Irmscher and Mantzel.

Mantzel's 4.0 L (4,032 cc) engine used an M4024V code number and modified standard 30NE/C30NE/C30LE/C30SE coded Opel engine blocks for its 4.0 litre conversions. This is used as an option in the 1980 - 1986 Bitter SC.

The Irmscher engine had a C40SE code and was the only one of these two engines to use a specially cast engine block as part of this increased capacity engine conversion. These engines have a bore and stroke of 98 mm (3.86 in) and 88 mm (3.46 in) respectively, for an overall displacement of 4.0 L (3,983 cc). The Irmscher version produced 272 PS (200 kW; 268 hp). It was installed in the Opel Omega A and Senator B, and was an option in the Opel Omega Evolution 500 models.

== OHC Diesel versions ==
Diesel derivatives of the CIH engine family first appeared in September 1972, and progressively became more popular in the following two decades. These compression-ignition engines were used in Opel's medium or high range cars and were designed for maximum fuel economy and long life, with performance a secondary consideration. They received a stiffened block, longer strokes, and a single overhead cam head, the latter two making this engine considerably taller than the petrol CIH units. Most installations required a noticeable bump in the bonnet to fit the taller diesel engines. All OHC Diesels were inline four-cylinder engines. They were offered in three displacements, listed below.

=== 2.0 litre diesel ===
The 2.0 litre saw wider use at the end of the 1970s, but in some markets, including Italy, it had appeared already at the end of 1974. This engine was created by reducing the earlier 2.1 litre diesel unit's bore from 88 mm (3.5 in) to 86.5 mm (3.4 in), while retaining its 85 mm (3.3 in) stroke, for a total displacement of 1,998 cc (121.9 cu in). It was built only in naturally aspirated form and in a single variant, the 20D, whose compression ratio was 22:1. Fuel supply was provided by Bosch injection. The maximum power supplied by this engine was 58 PS (43 kW; 57 hp) at 4400 rpm, while the maximum torque was 117 N⋅m (86 lb⋅ft) between 2000 and 2200 rpm. This engine was available in:

- Opel Rekord D 2.0 D (1974-77 in select markets, including Italy)
- Opel Rekord E 2.0 D (1977–81)
- Opel Ascona B 2.0 D (1978–81)

=== 2.1 litre diesel ===
The CIH 2.1 litre diesel engine appeared in 1972 as an engine option in the Opel Rekord D range. This engine has the distinction of marking the debut of the Rüsselsheim company in the production of diesel engines. The 2.1 litre had bore and stroke dimensions of 88 mm × 85 mm (3.5 in × 3.3 in), for a displacement of 2,068 cc (126.2 cu in). It was built only in naturally aspirated form and in only one variant; the 21D. The compression ratio and the fuel injection system were the same 22:1 and Bosch system used later in the 20D. Power and torque outputs were different, but only slightly: the 21D engine was capable of delivering a maximum power of 60 PS (44 kW; 59 hp) at 4400 rpm, with a maximum torque of 120 N⋅m (89 lb⋅ft) at 2500 rpm. It appeared in:

- Opel Rekord D 2.1 D (1972–77)
- Opel Rekord E 2.1 D (1977–81)

=== 2.3 litre diesel ===
The CIH 2.3 litre diesel engine was introduced in 1979 and by the 1980s had become a staple of Opel's automotive production for high-end diesel models. This engine resulted from the reworking of the 2.1 litre diesel engine, which was also slated for replacement. The bore was enlarged from 88 mm (3.5 in) to 92 mm (3.6 in), while the stroke remained unchanged at 85 mm (3.3 in). As a result, displacement rose to 2,260 cc (137.9 cu in). Unlike the other two CIH diesel versions, the 2.3 litre was offered in several variants, some of which used forced induction in either a turbocharged version or the very rare Comprex configuration. Forced induction diesels have few differences to N/A engines: sintered metal dry cylinder sleeves, piston cooling oil squirts with oil feed pipe outside cylinder block and high volume oil pump.

Variants of the 2.3 litre version are listed below.

==== 23D ====
With this code the debut variant of the 2.3 litre diesel engine is indicated. It is a naturally aspirated engine with a compression ratio of 22:1 and Bosch fuel injection. Some features were taken from the previous naturally aspirated 2.1 litre. Maximum power supplied by this engine was 65 PS (48 kW; 64 hp) at 4200 rpm, with maximum torque of 127 N⋅m (94 lb⋅ft) at 2500 rpm. Later versions, with a compression ratio of 22.1:1, produce 71 PS (52 kW; 70 hp) at 4400 rpm, and a maximum torque of 135 N⋅m (100 lb⋅ft) at 2400 rpm. This engine appeared in:

- Opel Rekord E 2.3D (1979-1986)
- Bedford CF1 (1980-1986)

==== 23DK ====
This variant was produced for a short period of time; from 1984 to 1986. It is a supercharged variant using a Comprex pressure wave supercharger. The compression ratio was 23:1 and the fuel system was Bosch injection. Maximum power produced by this engine was 95 PS (70 kW; 94 hp) at 4200 rpm, with a peak torque 195 N⋅m (144 lb⋅ft) at 2200 rpm. It was used in:

- Opel Senator A 2.3 Comprex D (1984-1986)

==== 23DT ====
This variant was also introduced in 1984 using a traditional turbocharger unlike the 23DK supercharged unit. The 23DT is Opel's first turbodiesel engine. As in the 20DK Comprex variant, the compression ratio is 23:1, and the injection system is by Bosch. The turbocharger used was a KKK K24. Maximum power was 86 PS (63 kW; 85 hp) at 4200 rpm, while maximum torque was 192 N⋅m (142 lb⋅ft) between 2200 and 2400 rpm. This engine found use in:

- Opel Rekord E 2.3 TD (1984–86)
- Opel Senator A 2.3 TD (1984–86)

==== 23YD ====
This variant is a naturally aspirated model introduced in September 1986, a few months after the launch of the Opel Omega A which the engine was developed for. Compared to the earlier naturally aspirated 23D, the compression ratio was raised from 22:1 to 23:1, while the injection system has remained unchanged. Maximum output was increased from 65 to 73 PS (48 to 54 kW; 64 to 72 hp) at 4400 rpm, with maximum torque of 138 N⋅m (102 lb⋅ft) at 2400 rpm. From 1989 on the engine had a catalytic converter.

- Opel Omega A 2.3 D (1986–93)

==== 23YDT ====
This model was a 2.3 litre turbodiesel that resulted from an update of the previous 23DT. The new engine did not include major changes, but provided more horsepower, reaching 90 PS (66 kW; 89 hp) at 4200 rpm and reaching a maximum torque of 190 N⋅m (140 lb⋅ft) at 2200 rpm, just below that of the 23DT engine.

- Opel Omega A 2.3 TD (1986-1988)

==== 23DTR ====
This model is the last CIH Four diesel engine produced by Opel. It is an update of the 23YDT unit which it replaced beginning in August 1988. Compared to the previous version, the turbocharger was changed from a KKK K24 to a K14 from the same manufacturer and added air-to-air intercooler. This engine delivered a maximum power of 100 PS (74 kW; 99 hp) 4200 rpm and was installed in the following models:

- Opel Omega A 2.3 TD (1988–93)
- Opel Frontera A 2.3 TD (1991–95)

While in the first model above maximum torque was 218 N⋅m (161 lb⋅ft) between 2000 and 2200 rpm, in the second it was just below 215 N⋅m (159 lb⋅ft) at 2200 rpm.

== Motorsports ==
The CIH engine had a long competition career in both four- and six-cylinder forms. It won the 1966 European Rally Championship, with Swedish driver Lillebror Nasenius at the wheel of an Opel Rekord B.

In 1969 Virgilio Conrero became the official director of Opel's rally team, with responsibility for preparing the cars and selecting drivers. The arrangement lasted until 1986. Conrero prepared cars first appeared in hill climbs. In 1971 an Opel GT won the GT2.0 class at the Targa Florio.

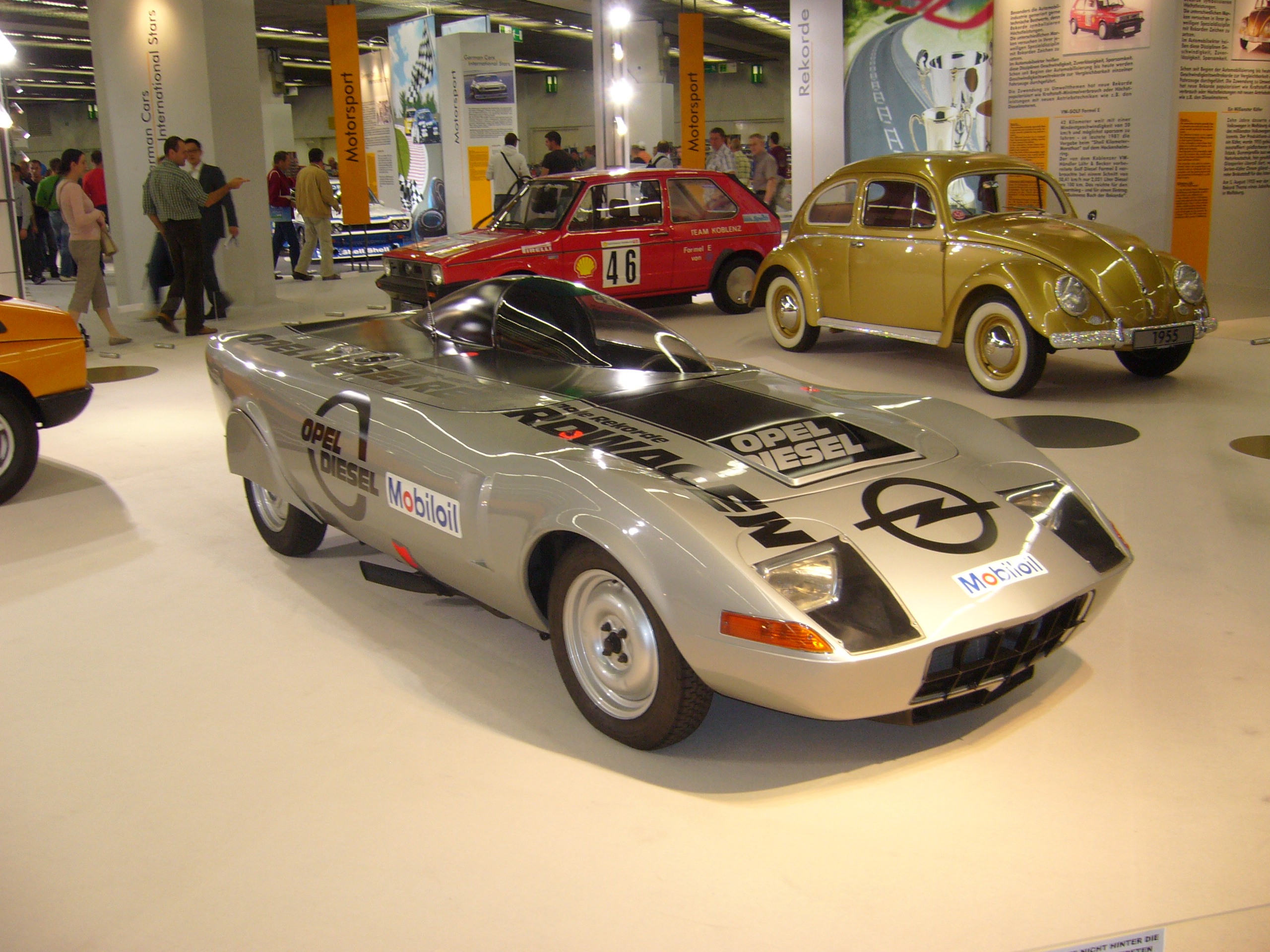
1972 Opel GT diesel Rekordwagen

In June 1972, prior to the September launch of their new diesel engine, Opel set two world records and eighteen international records at the Dudenhofen proving ground with their diesel Rekordwagen. The car was a custom-bodied single-seat Opel GT with a turbocharged version of the 2.1 L OHC diesel engine developing 95 PS (70 kW).
