= Opel Commodore =

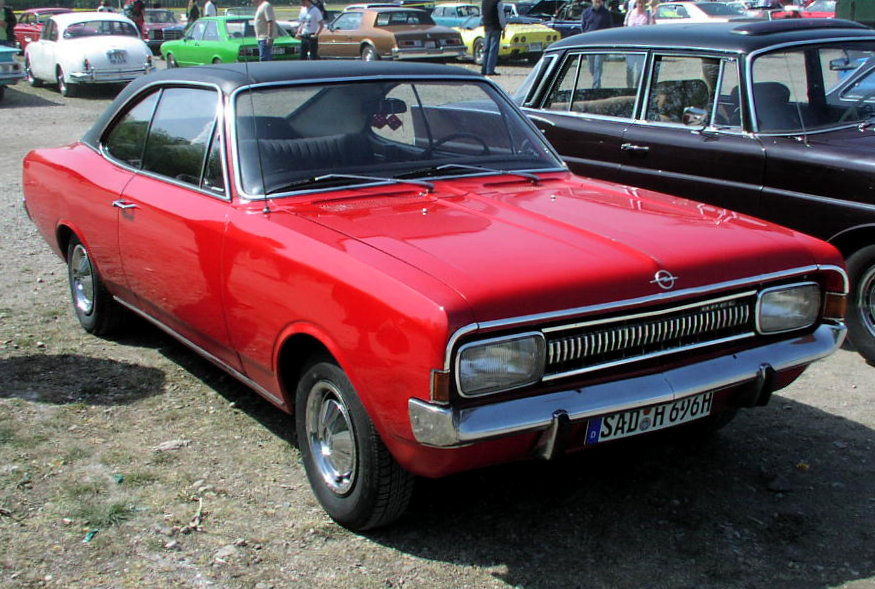
- Opel Commodore A Coupé

Overview
- Manufacturer: Opel (General Motors)
- Production: 1967–1986

Body and chassis
- Class: Executive car (E)
- Platform: V body
- Related: Holden Commodore

Chronology
- Successor: Opel Omega

The Opel Commodore is an executive car (E-segment) produced by Opel from 1967 to 1986. It is the six-cylinder variant of the Rekord with styling differences. The Commodore nameplate was used by Opel from 1967 to 1982 in Europe and to 1986 in South Africa. The Commodore nameplate was adopted by Holden in Australia, where it continued until 2020. The last generation was sold in the United Kingdom primarily as the Vauxhall Viceroy although Opel-badged models were also sold there, and the Chevrolet Commodore in South Africa from 1978 to 1982, when it was renamed the Opel Commodore.

== Commodore A (1967–1971) ==
Commodore A
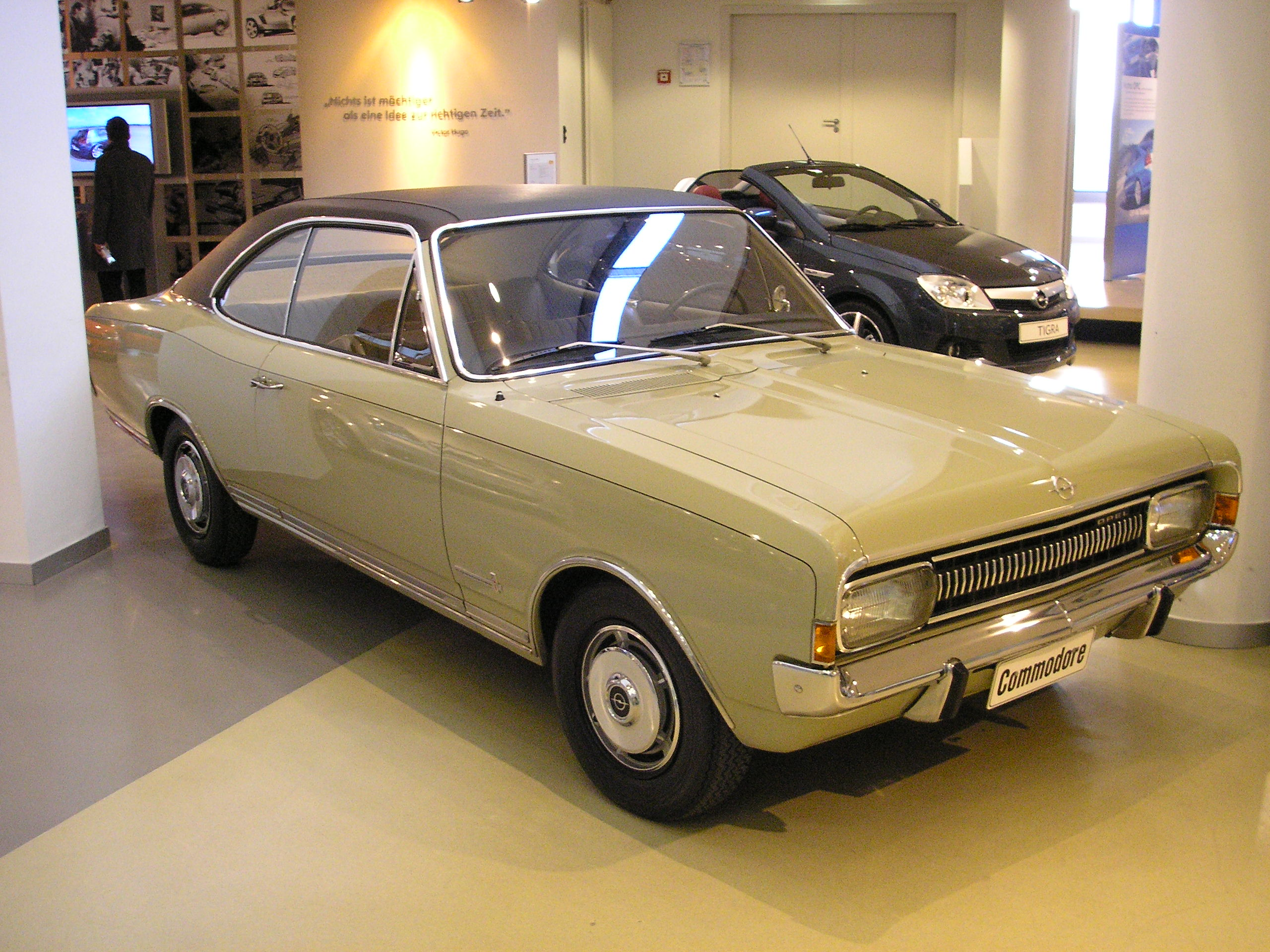
- 1970 Opel Commodore A Coupé

Overview
- Production: 1967–1971
- Assembly: Germany: Rüsselsheim

Body and chassis
- Body style: 2-door saloon 4-door saloon 2-door fastback coupé
- Related: Opel Rekord C Chevrolet Opala; Ranger

Powertrain
- Engine: 2.2 L-I6: 95 PS (70 kW; 94 hp); 2.5 L-I6: 115 PS (85 kW; 113 hp), 120 PS (88 kW; 118 hp); 130 PS (96 kW; 128 hp); 150 PS (110 kW; 148 hp); 2.8 L-I6: 145 PS (107 kW; 143 hp)
- Transmission: 4-speed manual 2- or 3-speed-automatic

Dimensions
- Wheelbase: 2,668 mm (105.0 in)
- Length: 4,574 mm (180.1 in)
- Width: 1,754 mm (69.1 in)
- Height: 1,445 mm (56.9 in)
- Curb weight: 1,130–1,270 kg (2,491–2,800 lb)

The Opel Commodore A was manufactured from 1967 to 1971, based on the Rekord C. After having offered a Rekord-6 powered by a 2.6 L 6-cylinder engine (which originated in the Opel Kapitän, Admiral and Diplomat) since March 1964, Opel in February 1967 launched the Commodore as a faster up-market version of the Rekord. The Commodore was initially available with the proven 2.2-litre six and a larger 2.5 L engine developing 115 PS (85 kW) with a single carburettor. The 2239 cc engine with which the Commodore was launched shared its 82.5 x 69.8 mm cylinder dimensions with the four-cylinder 1492 cc Rekord engine on which it was based. The unit was first seen in the short-lived six-cylinder version of the Opel Rekord towards the end of 1966, but ceased to be offered in the Rekord after July 1967 when it became the entry level power unit for the newly introduced Opel Commodore. Body styles comprised a two-door or four-door notchback saloon and a two-door hardtop/fastback coupé. In September 1967 the sporty Commodore GS offering 130 PS (96 kW) from a dual-carburettor 2.5-litre six was introduced.

For the 1969 model year, the carryover 2.2-litre six was dropped and the optional 2-speed Powerglide automatic was abandoned in favor of Opel's new 3-speed automatic transmission.

From September 1969, the base 2.5 L-engine was pumped up to 120 PS (88 kW); at the same time, both remaining engines received hydraulic lifters for smoother running, a new exhaust system and six camshaft bearings. The handbrake lever was moved from its position under the dash to a location between the front seats and the fuel tank was enlarged from 55 to 70 litres.

An even more sporty model than the GS, the Commodore GS/E, debuted in March 1970. It had a 2.5 L engine equipped with Bosch D-jetronic fuel injection system developing 150 PS (110 kW), which gave the car a top speed of 197 km/h (122 mph). The Commodore GS/E also had a career in motorsports, with a car prepared by Steinmetz. In April 1970 a Commodore with a detuned and carburetted 2.8 L-six giving 145 PS (107 kW) followed (GS 2800).

156,330 Commodore As were built, including 2,574 GS and GS/E variants.

The Rekord C/Commodore A "V body" platform was used by GM to produce other models in many markets, these include the Ranger sold in mainland Europe and also in South Africa, as well as the GM Opala which was built and sold in South America from 1968 through to 1992. Ranger and Opala production commenced two years after the Commodore A's debut in 1966.

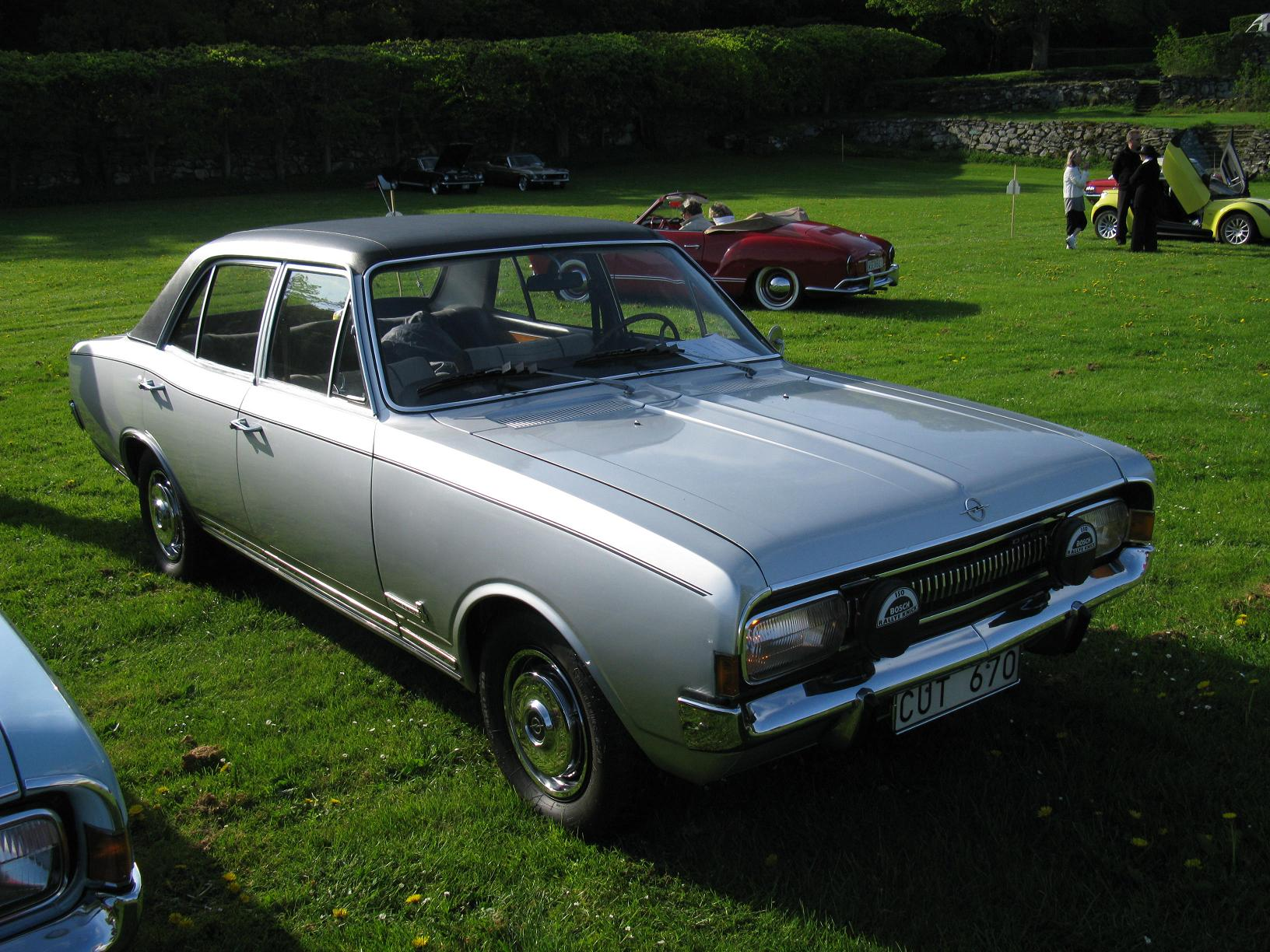
Opel Commodore A sedan

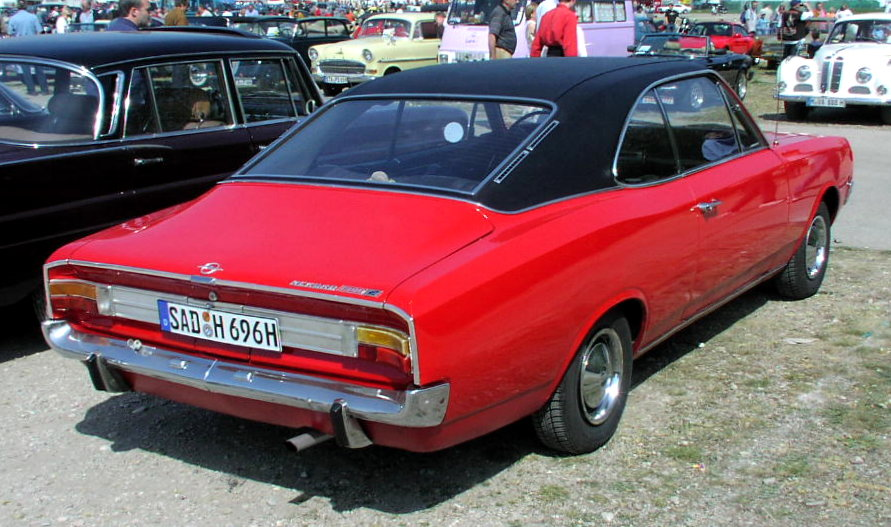
Opel Commodore A coupe rear

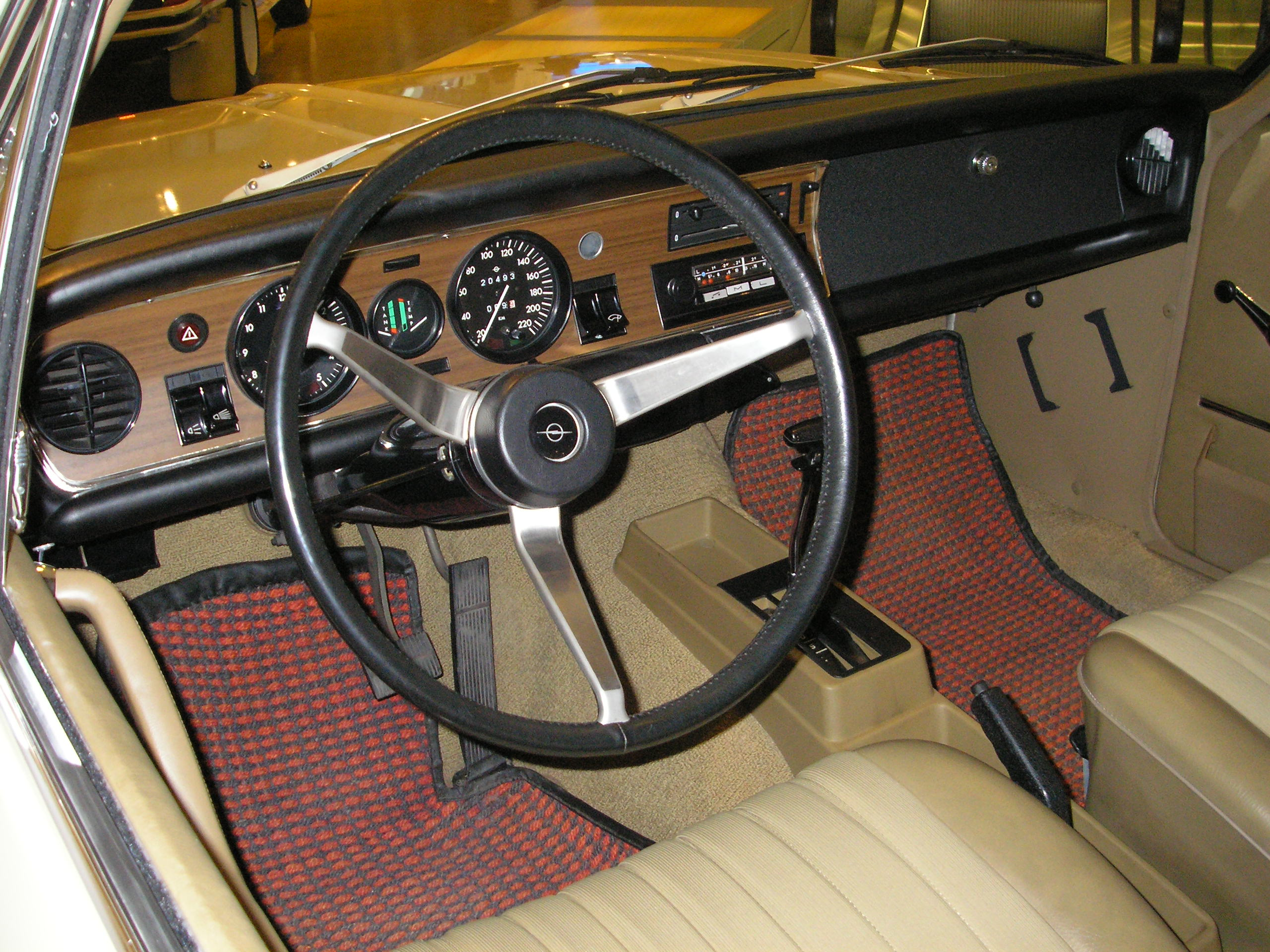
Interior

GS/E History

All engines for the Commodore were 12 valve, CIH straight-six engines ranging from 2.2 to 2.8 litres. All but one engine option had single-barrel (2.2) or double-barrel (2.5; 2.8) downdraught carburetor. in 1970 the GS/E model was introduced which as its badge implies did not utilise carburetors, the "E" meaning Einspritzung or fuel injection in English.

Opels didn't have the reputation for performance cars in the period and they had seen the positive impact on sales for other race winning manufacturers on having performance models in their range of cars. Opel wanted to be in this area of the market and the results of this desire was the Commodore GS/E.

The carburettors were ditched in favour of a Bosch D-Jetronic, Bosch's first commercially produced electronic fuel injection system. Bosch D-Jetronic was a very early version of multi-point EFI, the “D” stood for “drucksensorgesteuert” (pressure sensor regulated). Unlike later Bosch fuel injection system, the injection was direct to the cylinder instead of via the Plenum inlets, which meant the a specific cylinder head was manufactured specifically for the engine, making this model unique and expensive to produce and purchase. Different from older mechanical injection systems, it incorporated taking input from the pressure inside the intake manifold. This is known as the Air Mass Sensor or in modern terms this would be known as the MAP-sensor (manifold absolute pressure), a part that's commonly found in more modern vehicles.

Bosch sold the patent to Japanese companies that continue to produce injection systems based on D-Jetronic.

D-Jetronic fuel injection was installed onto the 2.5 litre engine with the modified cylinder head, increasing power by 20 PS (15 kW), making it more powerful than the larger, 2.8-litre engine. The fuel injected engine, named 2500 E, now produced 150 PS (110 kW; 148 hp) at 5,800 rpm and 196 N⋅m (145 lb⋅ft) of torque at 4,500 rpm with an unchanged compression ratio of 9.5:1. For comparison, the base model Porsche 911T in 1970 had 25 PS (18 kW; 25 hp) less, but was more expensive. The GS/E could accelerate from 0–100 km/h (62 mph) in 9.5 seconds, a similar value to the same period Porsche 911. It could also reach a top speed of 192 km/h (119 mph).

The GS/E Coupe model is known affectionately as the "German Charger".

== Commodore B (1972–1977) ==
Commodore B
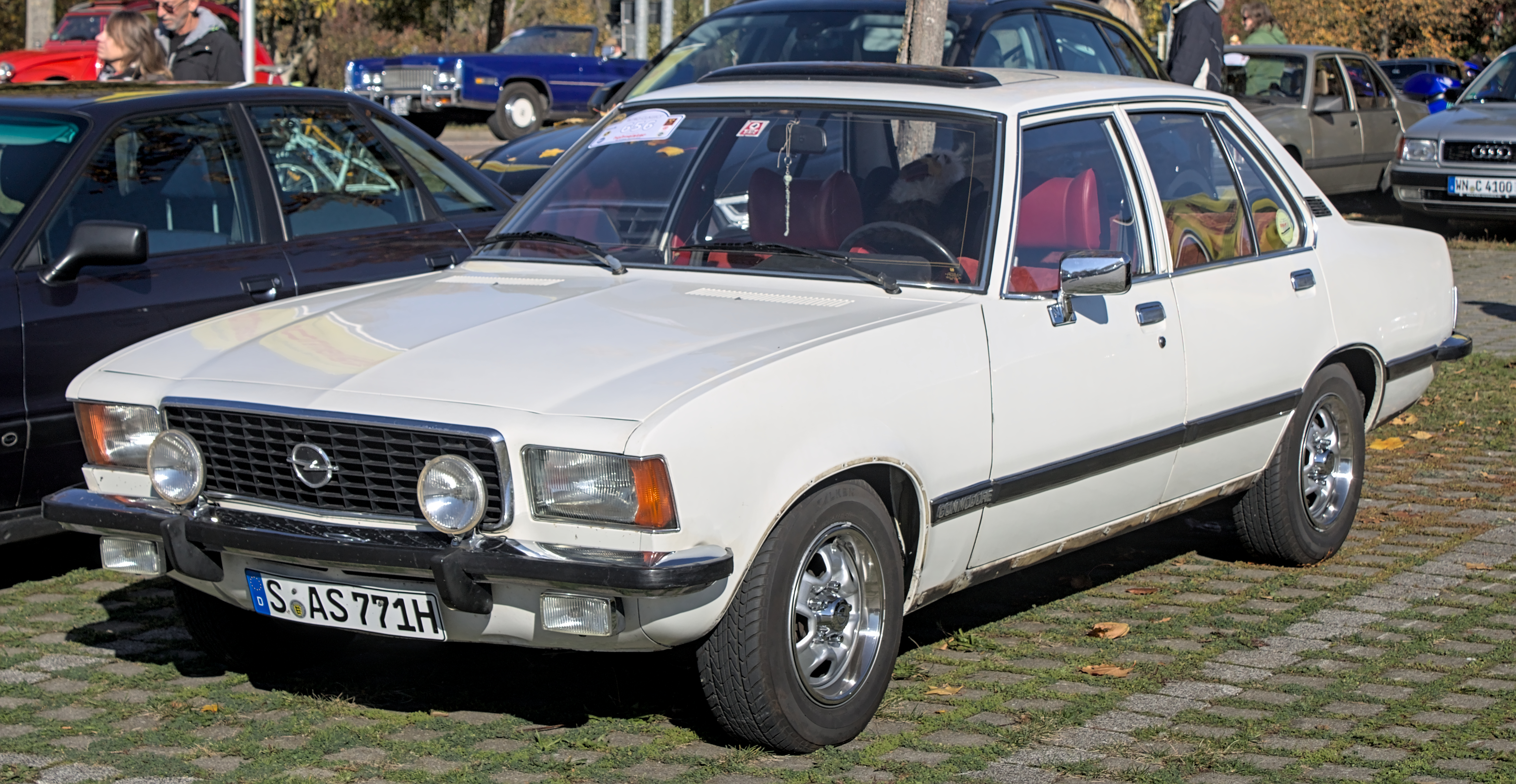

Overview
- Production: 1972–1977; 1973–1978 (South Africa); 1974–1976 (Iran)
- Assembly: Germany: Rüsselsheim; Iran: Tehran (GM Iran); South Africa: Port Elizabeth (GMSA)
- Designer: Chuck Jordan

Body and chassis
- Body style: 4-door saloon 2-door coupé
- Related: Opel Rekord D

Powertrain
- Engine: 2490 cc 25S/H CIH I6; 2784 cc 28S/H/E CIH I6
- Transmission: 4-speed manual; 3-speed automatic

Dimensions
- Wheelbase: 2,668 mm (105.0 in)
- Length: 4,607 mm (181.4 in)
- Width: 1,728 mm (68.0 in)
- Height: 1,380–1,415 mm (54.3–55.7 in)
- Curb weight: 1,210–1,305 kg (2,667.6–2,877.0 lb)

The Commodore B was based on the Rekord D, and launched in 1972. As in the previous generation, four models were offered: 2500 S, 2500 GS, 2800 GS, and 2800 GS/E, as a four-door saloon and two-door hardtop coupé (although the fastback design was replaced by a more conventional three-box design). Power of the 2.5-litre engine was 115 or 130 PS (85 or 96 kW) depending on the specifications (25S/25H), while carburetted 2.8-liters had 130 or 142 PS (96 or 104 kW). The fuel injected 2.8 used in the GS/E has 160 PS (118 kW).

The Rekord and Commodore were also assembled as CKD kits in Belgium and Switzerland in the 1970s. These cars carried the name Ranger and differed from the originals in having different grilles and trim. These cars were exported to various countries.

In 1974, due to new regulations regarding pollutant emissions, the 2.5-litre models were dropped and the 2.8 L models were detuned to 129 / 140 / 155 PS (95 / 103 / 114 kW). Commodore B production ended in 1977.

The Commodore B series was like the A series briefly used in motorsports, and the extreme "Jumbo" Commodore raced in the 1974 "interserie". It used a 6.0-litre V8 engine and had large wings which almost made it unrecognizable as an Opel. It never enjoyed much success despite its massive powerplant and impressive output.

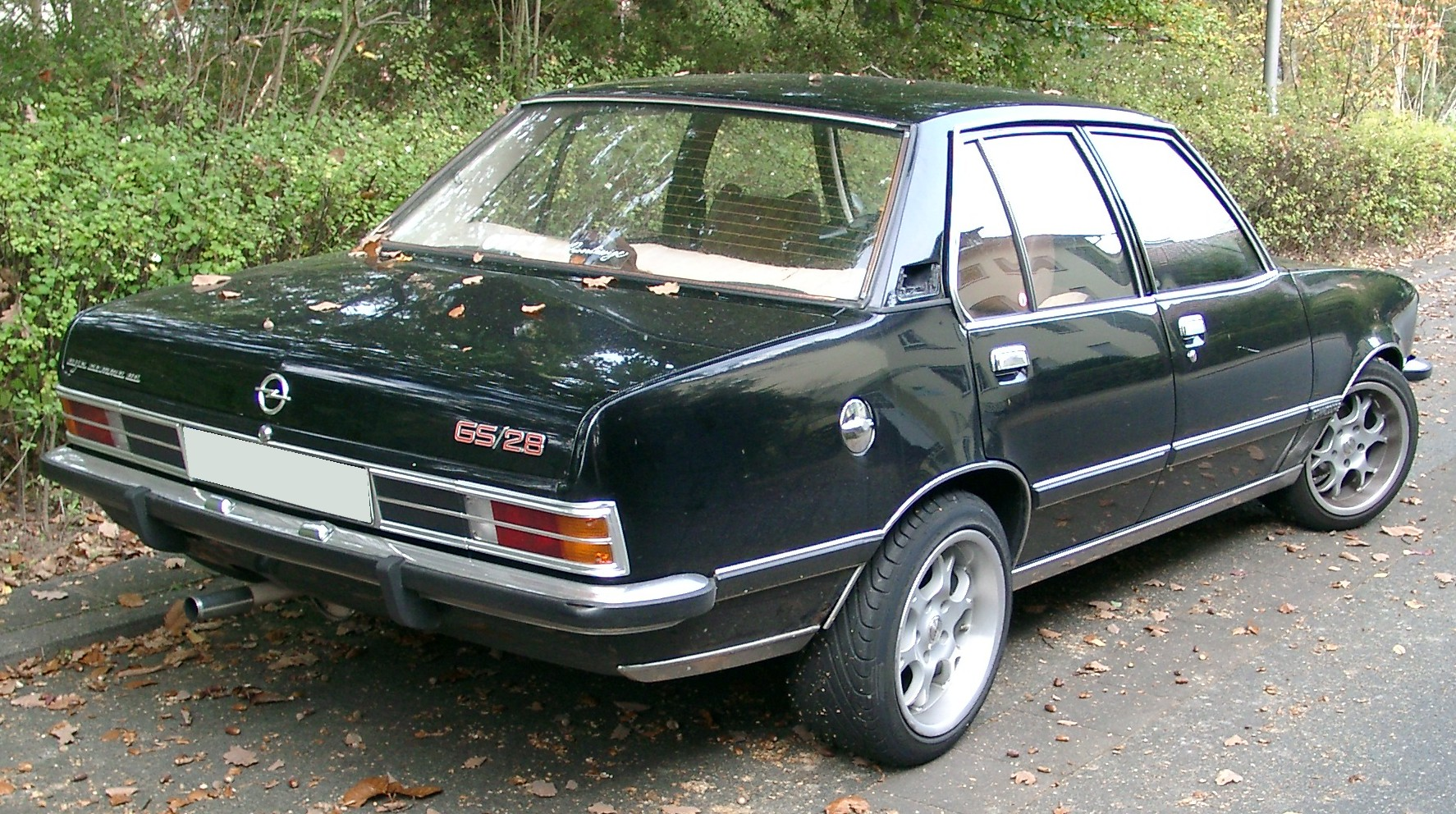
Opel Commodore GS

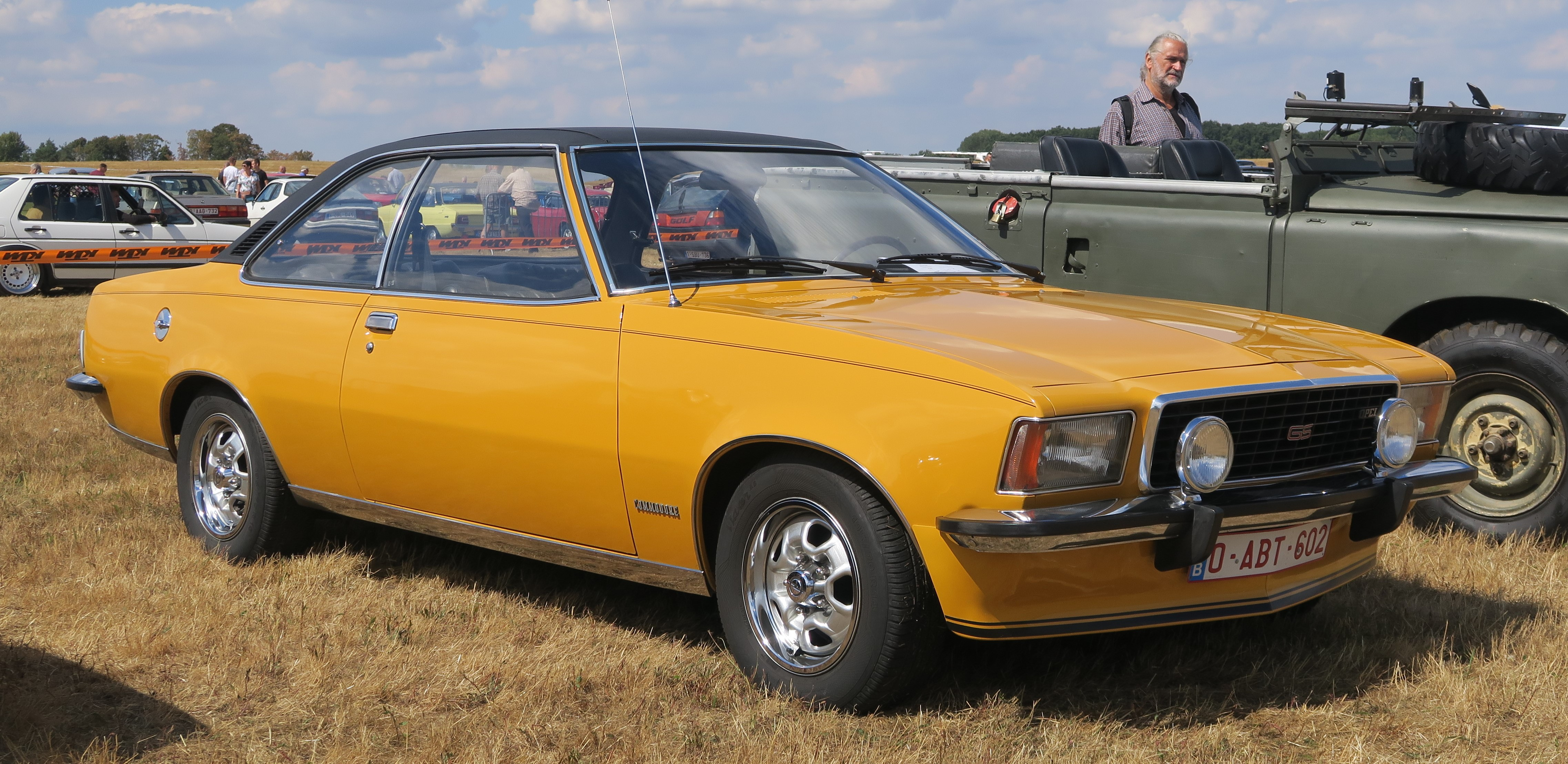
Opel Commodore GS Coupé

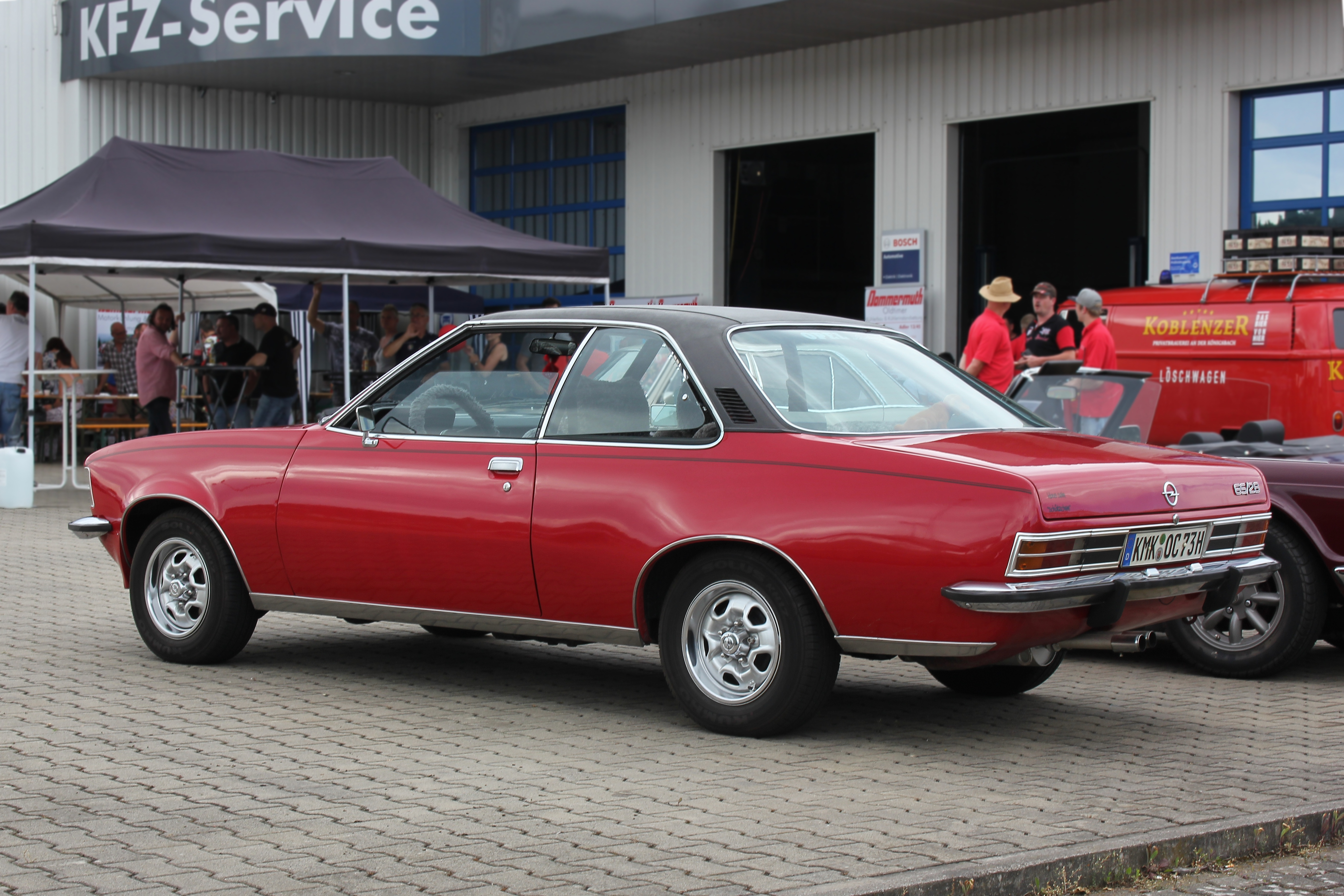
Opel Commodore GS Coupé (rear view)

=== Foreign assembly ===
Opel Commodores were also built in Iran between 1974 and 1976 under the name Chevrolet Iran 2800, 2500, Royal and Custom with both 2.5 L and 2.8 L engines by Pars Khodro (General Motors Iran). The first Royale, also the first Chevrolet car built in Iran, left the production line on 15 January 1974. The Royale sold well initially, but the car had not been re-engineered for Iranian conditions and the low ground clearance coupled with carburettor troubles led to its reputation quickly being tarnished. The car was withdrawn by early 1977, replaced by the locally-built versions of the Buick Skylark, Chevrolet Nova, and Cadillac Seville (American origins).

It was also assembled in South Africa, where it was called the Chevrolet 2500, 3800, and 4100, and was a top seller in that market. These received inline-four or -six engines of Chevrolet origins, built locally.

== Commodore C (1978–1986) ==
Commodore C
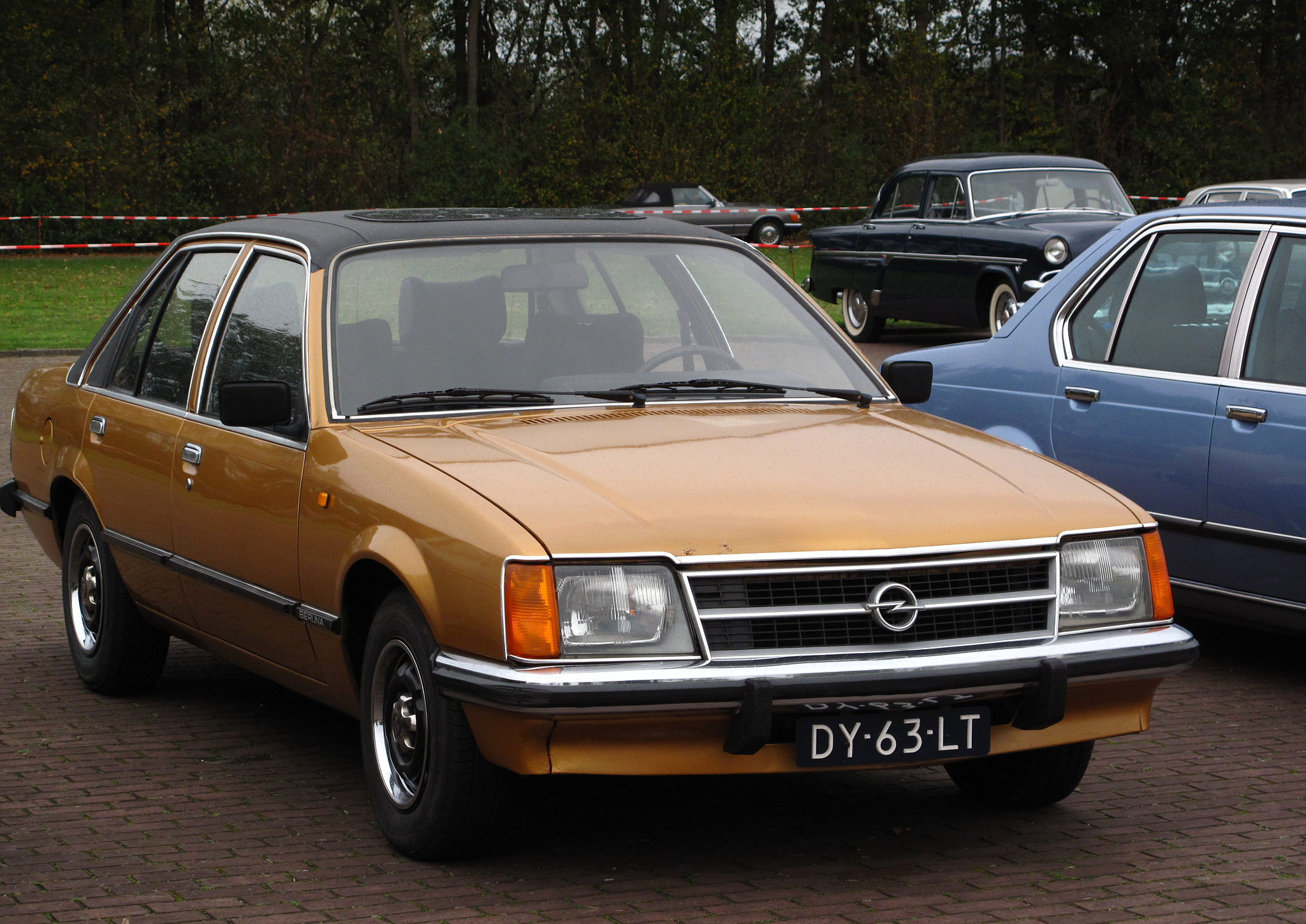

Overview
- Also called: Chevrolet Commodore (South Africa); Vauxhall Viceroy (United Kingdom)
- Production: 1978–1986
- Assembly: Germany: Rüsselsheim; South Africa: Port Elizabeth (GMSA)

Body and chassis
- Body style: 2/4-door saloon 5-door estate
- Related: Opel Rekord E; Opel Senator A; Holden Commodore (VB)

Powertrain
- Engine: 2.5 L Opel CIH I6; 3.0 L Opel CIH I6; 3.8 L Chevrolet 230 I6 (ZA); 4.1 L Chevrolet 250 I6 (ZA)
- Transmission: 4-speed manual; 3-speed automatic

Dimensions
- Wheelbase: 2,668 mm (105.0 in)
- Length: 4,732 mm (186.3 in)
- Width: 1,722 mm (67.8 in)
- Height: 1,415 mm (55.7 in)
- Curb weight: 1,200–1,310 kg (2,646–2,888 lb)

Chronology
- Successor: Opel Omega A

The Commodore C was first shown in late 1977, at the same time as the Rekord E. It only entered series production in October the following year, however. The South African version of this car, the Chevrolet Commodore, was actually ahead of the European original model to enter production, in September 1978. The Commodore continued to be a larger and more luxurious version of the Rekord. There was no coupé version of the Commodore C, as it was replaced by the Opel Monza, the coupé version of the Opel Senator, but a two-door notchback saloon was available until June 1981. The single engine used by the Commodore in Europe was the well-known straight-six 2.5-litre unit with 115 PS (85 kW; 113 hp) or 130 PS (96 kW; 128 hp) when fitted with fuel injection. It followed Holden's lead with the Holden Commodore (VB), which also combined the body of the Rekord with the front-end of the Senator.

The Commodore C was never a success, occupying an uncomfortably narrow niche between the Rekord and Senator. Another concern was the fuel mileage, with a fuel injected Commodore taking considerably more fuel than the larger three-liter Senator. The outdated engine also had little torque available at lower engine speeds, and was noisy.

The new model featured a similar front end to the larger Senator. It was sold in the UK under the name Vauxhall Viceroy, with the Viceroy being a slightly more luxurious version of the Carlton. There was an estate version (dubbed the "Voyage" in Germany) offered in the Opel range from April 1981 until the end of production in 1982, which became a mainstay in the Holden range in Australia and was also available in the Chevrolet range in South Africa. It was never offered by Vauxhall in the UK as a Viceroy, although a one-off estate car was built in 1981 for Queen Elizabeth II, for her to carry her Corgi dogs. The car still survives today, one of only 15 Vauxhall Viceroys left registered in the UK, as of 2006.

The Commodore was dropped by Opel in Europe in 1982.

=== Manufacture elsewhere ===
It was the Opel Commodore and Vauxhall Viceroy was sold in South Africa as the Chevrolet Commodore until 1982, when it was rebadged as an Opel. The South African Commodore was introduced in July 1978, at the same time as the Rekord E went on sale there. These originally had Chevrolet engines, pushrod inline-sixes of 3.8 or 4.1 liters. Sold as a standard or a GL (with the 4.1 only available as a sedan with automatic transmission), the South African version replaced the earlier Chevrolet 3800 and 4100, also based on the Commodore.

However, in South Africa, General Motors South Africa (later Delta) offered a revised version of the Commodore until 1986, again combining the bodyshell of the Rekord with the front end of the revised Senator. It was also sold there with the same 3-litre inline-six, producing 180 PS (132 kW).

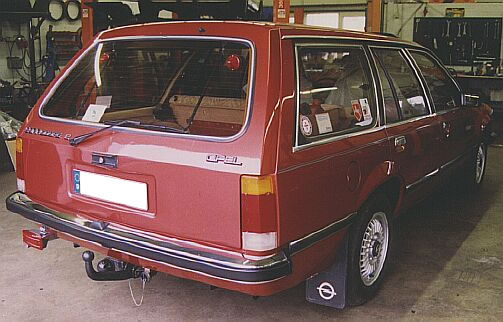
Opel Commodore C Voyage (1981–1982)

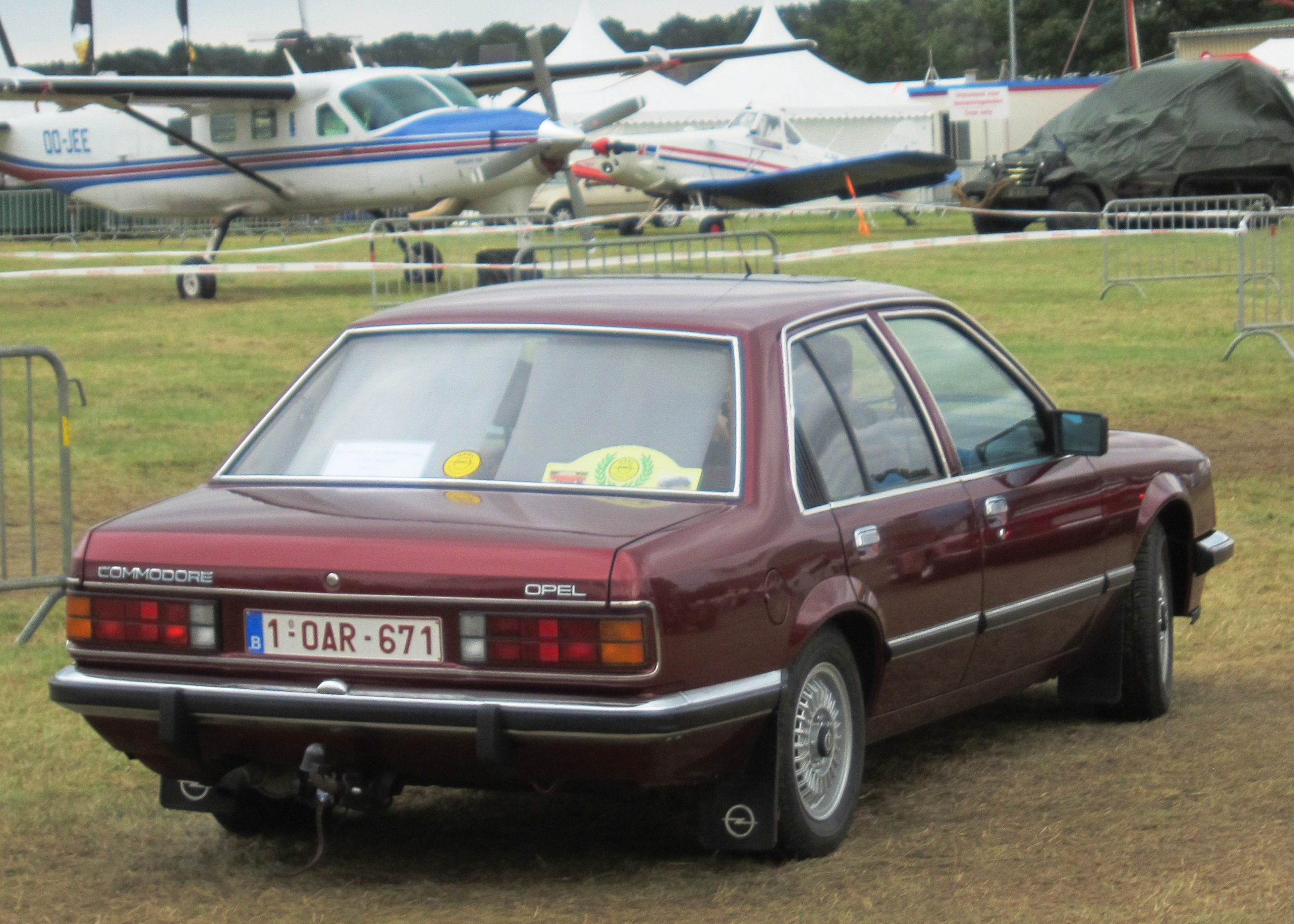
Opel Commodore C (1978–1982)

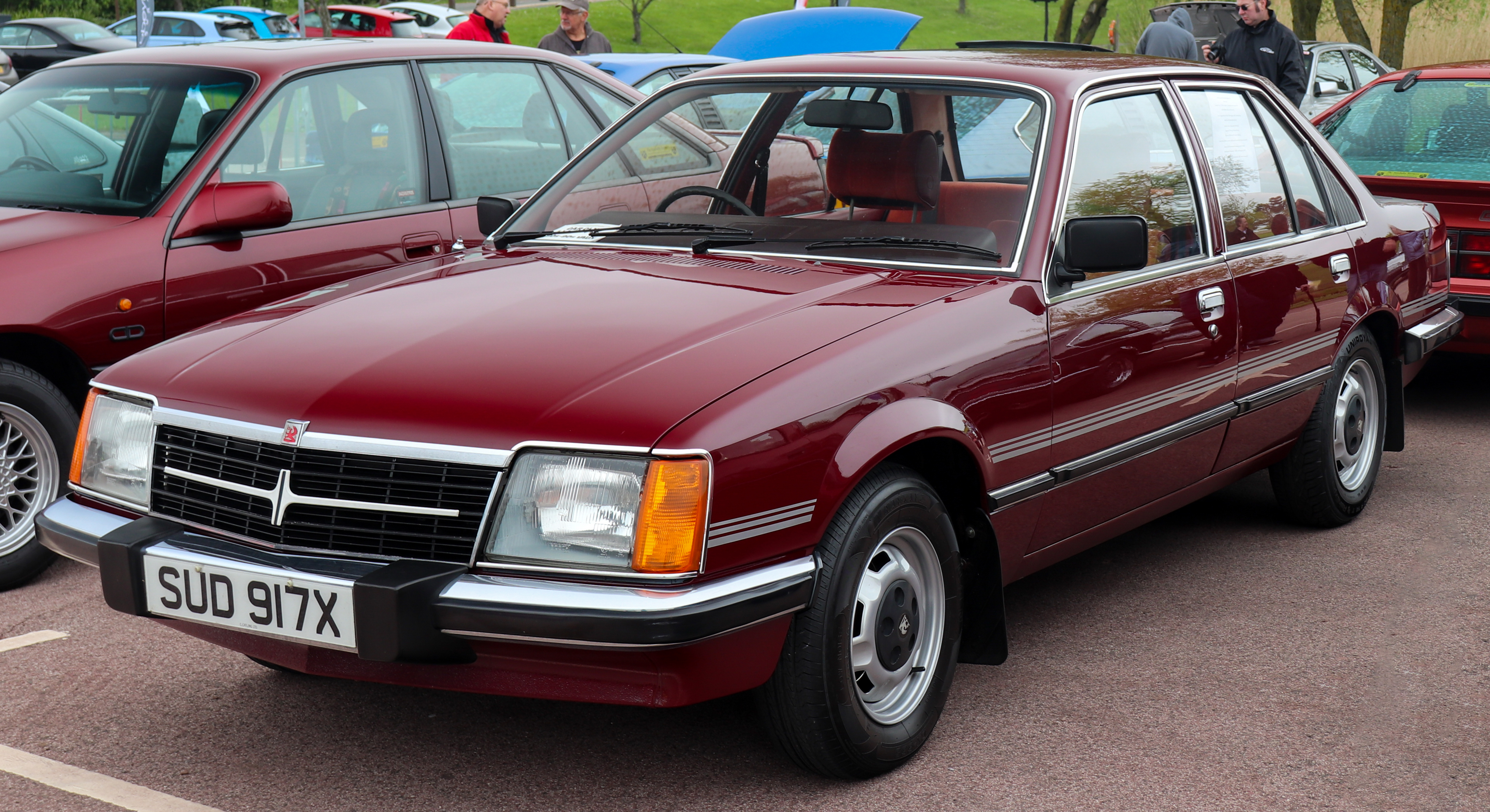
In the UK, the Opel Commodore C was also sold as the Vauxhall Viceroy

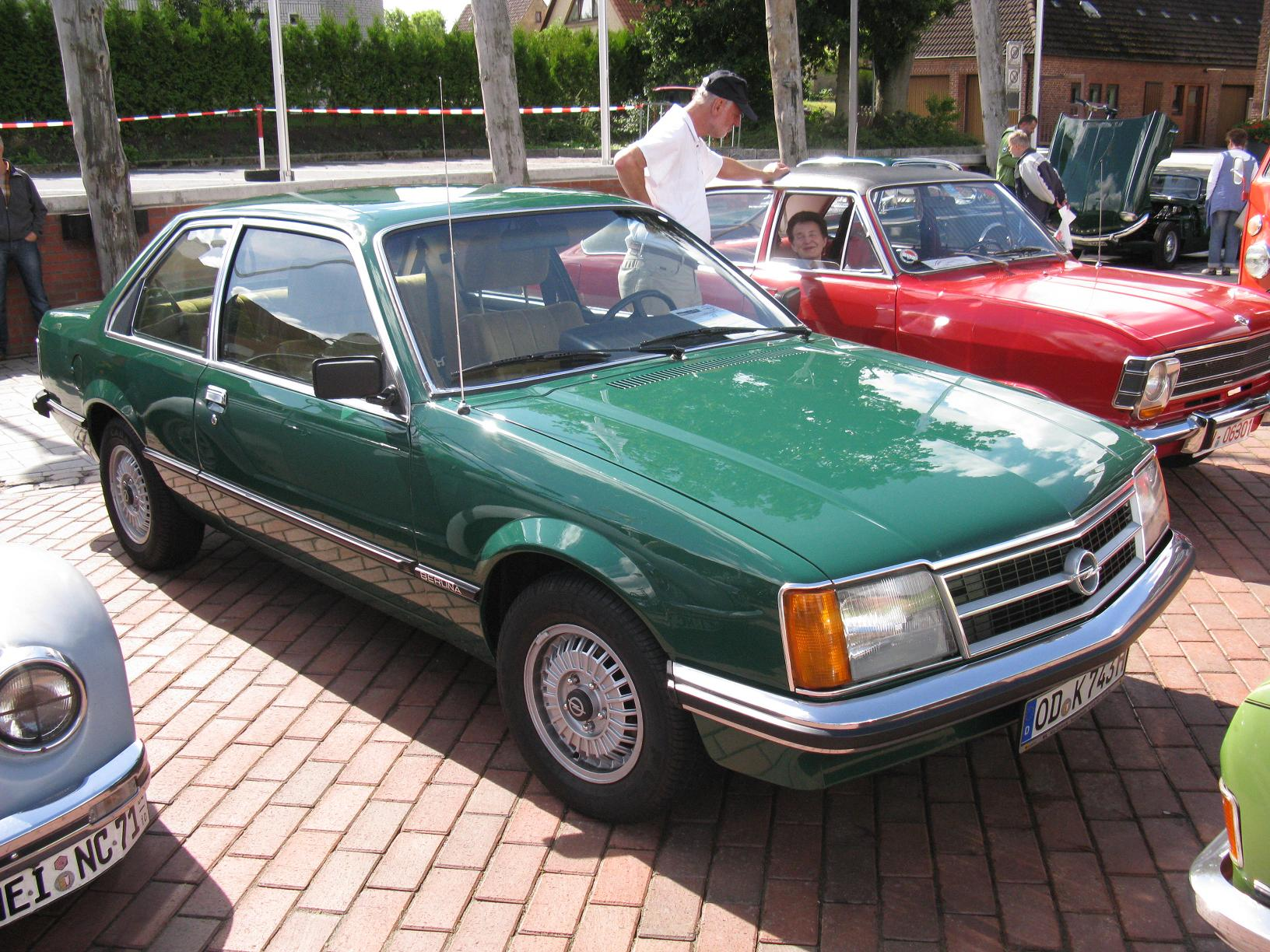
Opel Commodore C two-door; only about 5400 of this bodystyle were built (1978–1981)

== Sources ==
- Werner Oswald, Deutsche Autos 1945–1975. Motorbuch Verlag, Stuttgart 1975. ISBN 978-3-87943-391-9. (For Commodore A)
