= Opel straight-6 engine =

Opel Straight-6

Overview
- Manufacturer: Opel
- Also called: Vauxhall Straight-6
- Production: 1930-1966

Layout
- Configuration: Naturally aspirated Straight-6
- Displacement: 1.8 L (1,790 cc); 2.6 L (2,605 cc)
- Cylinder bore: 65 mm (2.56 in); 85 mm (3.35 in)
- Piston stroke: 90 mm (3.54 in); 76.5 mm (3.01 in)
- Valvetrain: OHV 2 valves x cyl.
- Compression ratio: 7.8:1

Combustion
- Fuel system: Carburetor
- Fuel type: Petrol
- Cooling system: Water-cooled

Output
- Power output: 33.5–91 PS (33.0–89.8 hp; 24.6–66.9 kW)
- Torque output: 100–186 N⋅m (74–137 lb⋅ft)

Chronology
- Successor: Opel CIH engine

Opel used the straight-6 engine configuration for many years. Opel used two straight-6 engines prior to the better-known CIH engine family.

== Moonlight ==
The Opel Moonlight roadster was the first Opel vehicle with a straight-6. It used a 1.8 L (1,790 cc) six in 1933. It was a 12-valve engine with a very-undersquare 65 mm × 90 mm (2.56 in × 3.54 in) bore and stroke, typical for the time. This engine produced 33.5 PS (33.0 hp; 24.6 kW) and 100 N⋅m (74 lb⋅ft).

== Kapitän ==
The 1959 Opel Kapitän was the next vehicle from the company with a straight-6 engine. This was a 2.6 L (2,605 cc) unit with 12 overhead valves. Bore and stroke were now oversquare for high power output at 85 mm × 76.5 mm (3.35 in × 3.01 in). A single Opel-designed carburetor and 7.8:1 compression yielded 91 PS (90 hp; 67 kW) and 186 N⋅m (137 lb⋅ft).

== See also ==
- List of GM engines
