= Stroke ratio =

Mechanical measurement

Bore/Stroke comparison

Stroke ratio, today often defined as bore/stroke ratio, is a term to describe the ratio between cylinder bore diameter and piston stroke length in a reciprocating piston engine. This can be used for either an internal combustion engine, where the fuel is burned within the cylinders of the engine, or external combustion engine, such as a steam engine, where the combustion of the fuel takes place outside the working cylinders of the engine.

== Conventions ==
The usual way to describe the stroke ratio of a piston engine‘s cylinders is its bore/stroke ratio. The diameter of the cylinder bore is divided by the length of the piston stroke to give the ratio.

Stroke/bore ratio is a less popular expression, dating from the early days of internal combustion engine development.

== Square, oversquare and undersquare engines ==
The following terms are used to label bore/stroke ratio:

=== Square engine ===
A square engine has equal bore and stroke dimensions, giving a bore/stroke value of exactly 1:1.

==== Square engine examples ====
1953 – Ferrari 250 Europa had Lampredi V12 with 68.0 mm × 68.0 mm (2.7 in × 2.7 in) bore and stroke.

1967 – FIAT 125, 124Sport engine 125A000, 125B000, 125BC000, 1608 ccm, DOHC, 80.0 mm × 80.0 mm (3.15 in × 3.15 in) bore and stroke.

1970 – Ford 400 had a 101.6 mm × 101.6 mm (4.00 in × 4.00 in) bore and stroke.

1973 – Kawasaki Z1 and KZ(Z)900 had a 66.0 mm × 66.0 mm (2.60 in × 2.60 in) bore and stroke.

1982 – Honda Nighthawk 250 and Honda CMX250C Rebel have a 53.0 mm × 53.0 mm (2.09 in × 2.09 in) bore and stroke.

1983 – Mazda FE 2.0L inline four-cylinder engine with a 86.0 mm × 86.0 mm (3.4 in × 3.4 in) bore and stroke.

1987 – The Opel/Vauxhall 2.0 L GM Family II engines are square at 86.0 mm × 86.0 mm (3.39 in × 3.39 in) bore and stroke; example as C20XE C20NE C20LET X20A X20XEV X20XER Z20LET Z20LEH Z20LER A20NHT A20NFT.

1989 – Nissan's SR20DE is a square engine, with an 86.0 mm × 86.0 mm (3.39 in × 3.39 in) bore and stroke.

1990–2002 – Maserati's biturbo 3.2L V8 has a bore and stroke of 80.0 mm × 80.0 mm (3.15 in × 3.15 in), and was used in the Shamal, 3200 GT and Quattroporte IV.

1990–2010 Saab B234/B235 is a square engine, with a 90.0 mm × 90.0 mm (3.54 in × 3.54 in) bore and stroke.

1991 – Ford's 4.6 V8 OHC engine has a 90.2 mm × 90.0 mm (3.552 in × 3.543 in) bore and stroke.

1995 – The BMW M52 engine with a displacement of 2793 cubic centimeters is an example of a perfect square engine with an 84.0 mm × 84.0 mm (3.31 in × 3.31 in) bore and stroke.

1996 – Jaguar's AJ-V8 engine in 4.0-litre form has an 86.0 mm bore and stroke.

2000 – Mercedes-Benz 4.0-litre (3996 cc; 243.9 cu in) OM628 V8 diesel engine is an example of a square engine – with an 86.0 mm × 86.0 mm (3.39 in × 3.39 in) bore and stroke.

2025 – Modenas Kriss 125 FI malaysia with 54.0 mm × 54.0 mm (2.1 in × 2.1 in) bore and stroke.

=== Oversquare engine ===
An engine is described as oversquare or short-stroke if its cylinders have a greater bore diameter than its stroke length, giving a bore/stroke ratio greater than 1:1.

An oversquare engine allows for more and larger valves in the head of the cylinder, higher possible rpm by lowering maximum piston speed, and lower crank stress due to the lower peak piston acceleration for the same engine (rotational) speed. Because these characteristics favor higher engine speeds, oversquare engines are often tuned to develop peak torque at a relatively high speed.

Due to the increased piston and head surface area, the heat loss increases as the bore/stroke ratio is increased. Thus an excessively high ratio can lead to a decreased thermal efficiency compared to other engine geometries. The large size/width of the combustion chamber at ignition can cause lack of homogeneity in the air/fuel mixture during combustion, resulting in higher emissions.

The reduced stroke length allows for a shorter cylinder and sometimes a shorter connecting rod, generally making oversquare engines less tall but wider than undersquare engines of similar engine displacement.

==== Oversquare engine examples ====
Oversquare engines (a.k.a. "short stroke engines") are very common, as they allow higher rpm (and thus more power), without excessive piston speed.

Examples include both Chevrolet and Ford small-block V8s; the GMC 478 V6 has a bore/stroke ratio of 1.33. The 1.6 litre version of the BMW N45 gasoline engine has a bore/stroke ratio of 1.167.

Flat engines, also known as horizontally opposed or boxer engines, typically feature oversquare designs since any increase in stroke length would result in twice the increase in overall engine width. This is particularly so in Subaru’s front-engine layout, where the steering angle of the front wheels is constrained by the width of the engine. The Subaru EJ181 engine develops peak torque at speeds as low as 3200 rpm.

BMC produced the 1071 cc and the 970 cc A-series engines in the early 1960's, both being oversquare with shorter stroke crankshafts than the 1275 cc versions. The 970 S being the rarest of all A series engines was produced to win the 1000 cc touring car championship of the time, which it duly did.

Nissan's RB, VQ, VK, VH and VR38DETT engines are all oversquare. Additionally, SR16VE engine found in Nissan Pulsar VZ-R and VZ-R N1 is an oversquare engine with 86 millimetres (3.39 in) bore and 68.7 millimetres (2.70 in) stroke, giving it 175–200 horsepower (130–150 kW) but relatively small torque of 119–134 pound-feet (161–182 N⋅m; 16.5–18.5 kg⋅m).

Extreme oversquare engines are found in Formula One racing cars, where strict rules limit displacement, thereby necessitating that power be achieved through high engine speeds. Stroke ratios approaching 2.5:1 are allowed, (Note: There is no actual restriction on bore:stroke ratio, but cylinder bores are limited to 98 millimetres or 3.86 inches and capacity to 2,400 cubic centimetres (150 cu in).) enabling engine speeds of 18,000 rpm while remaining reliable for multiple races.

The Ducati Panigale motorcycle engine is extremely oversquare with a bore/stroke ratio of 1.84:1. It was given the name "SuperQuadro" by Ducati, roughly translated as "super-square" from Italian.

The side-valve Belgian D-Motor LF26 aero-engine has a bore/stroke ratio of 1.4:1.

Early Mercedes-Benz M116 engines had a 92 millimetres (3.62 in) bore and a 65.6 millimetres (2.58 in) stroke for a 3.5 litre V8.

=== Undersquare engine ===
An engine is described as undersquare or long-stroke if its cylinders have a smaller bore (width, diameter) than its stroke (length of piston travel) – giving a ratio value of less than 1:1.

At a given engine speed, a longer stroke increases engine friction and increases stress on the crankshaft due to the higher peak piston acceleration. The smaller bore also reduces the area available for valves in the cylinder head, requiring them to be smaller or fewer in number.

Undersquare engines often exhibit peak torque at lower rpm than an oversquare engine due to their smaller valves and high piston speed limiting their potential to rev higher.

Undersquare engines have become more common lately, as manufacturers push for more and more efficient engines and higher fuel economy.

==== Undersquare engine examples ====
Many inline engines, particularly those mounted transversely in front-wheel-drive cars, use an undersquare design. The smaller bore allows for a shorter engine that increases room available for the front wheels to steer. Examples of this include many Volkswagen, Nissan, Honda, and Mazda engines. The 1KR-FE-engine used in the Toyota Aygo, Citroën C1 and Peugeot 107 amongst others is an example of a modern long-stroke engine widely used in FF layout cars. This engine has a bore and stroke of 71 mm × 84 mm (2.8 in × 3.3 in) stroke giving it a bore/stroke ratio of 0.845:1. Some rear-wheel-drive cars that borrow engines from front-wheel-drive cars (such as the Mazda MX-5) use an undersquare design.

BMW's acclaimed S54B32 M54 engine was undersquare with a bore and stroke of 87 mm × 91 mm (3.4 in × 3.6 in)), offering a world record torque-per-litre figure (114 N⋅m/L, 1.38 lb⋅ft/cu in) for normally aspirated production engines at the time; this record stood until Ferrari unveiled the 458 Italia.

Many British automobile companies used undersquare designs until the 1950s, largely because they were taxed according to the RAC horsepower system which was calculated based on the cylinder bore. This includes most members of the BMC A-Series engine family and many Nissan derivatives. The Trojan Car used an undersquare, split-piston, two-stroke, two-cylinder inline engine; this was partly for this tax advantage and partly because its proportions allowed flexing V-shaped connecting rods for the two pistons of each U-shaped cylinder, which was cheaper and simpler than two connecting rods joined with an additional bearing.

Their French and German competitors at the time also used undersquare designs even in absence of the tax reasoning, e. g. Renault Billancourt engine and Opel straight-6 engine.

The 225 cu in (3.7 litre) Chrysler Slant-6 engine is undersquare, with a bore and stroke of 86 mm × 105 mm (3.4 in × 4.1 in) stroke (bore/stroke ratio = 0.819:1).

The Ford 5.4L Modular Engine features a bore and stroke of 90.1 mm × 105.8 mm (3.55 in × 4.17 in), which makes a bore/stroke ratio of 0.852:1. Since the stroke is significantly longer than the bore, the SOHC 16V (2-valve per cylinder) version of this engine is able to generate a peak torque of 350 lb·ft as low as 2501 rpm.

The Willys Jeep L134 and F134 engines were undersquare, with a bore and stroke of 79.4 mm × 111.1 mm (3.13 in × 4.37 in) stroke (bore/stroke ratio = 0.714:1).

The Dodge Power Wagon used a straight-six Chrysler Flathead engine of 230 cu in (3.8 L) with a bore and stroke of 83 mm × 117 mm (3.3 in × 4.6 in), yielding a substantially undersquare bore/stroke ratio of 0.709:1.

The 4-litre Barra Inline 6 and Intech engines from the Australian Ford Falcon, uses a bore and stroke of 92.21 mm × 99.31 mm (3.63 in × 3.91 in) stroke, which equates to a 0.929:1 bore-stroke ratio.

The 292 Chevrolet I6 is also undersquare, with a bore and stroke of 98.4 mm × 104.8 mm (3.875 in × 4.125 in) in (bore/stroke ratio = 0.939:1).

Mitsubishi's 4G63T engine found primarily in many generations of Mitsubishi Lancer Evolution is an undersquare engine with a bore and stroke of 85 mm × 88 mm (3.3 in × 3.5 in).

The Jaguar XK6 engine, used in all 6-cylinder Jaguars from 1949 to 1987 was undersquare. For example, the 4.2 litre engine had a bore and stroke of 92.08 mm × 106 mm (3.63 in × 4.17 in), providing a bore/stroke ratio of 0.869:1.

Virtually all piston engines used in military aircraft were long-stroke engines. The PW R-2800, Wright R-3350, Pratt & Whitney R-4360 Wasp Major, Rolls-Royce Merlin (1650), Allison V-1710, and Hispano-Suiza 12Y-Z are only a few of more than a hundred examples.

All diesel-powered ships have massively undersquare marine engines, usually using crossheads. A Wärtsilä two-stroke marine diesel engine has a bore and stroke of 960 mm × 2,500 mm (37.8 in × 98.4 in), (bore/stroke ratio = 0.384:1).

Most modern motorcycle engines are square or oversquare, but a few are undersquare. The Kawasaki Z1300's straight-six engine was made undersquare to minimise engine width. More recently, a new straight-twin engine for the Honda NC700 series used an undersquare design to achieve better combustion efficiency in order to reduce fuel consumption.
