= Opel Kadett B =

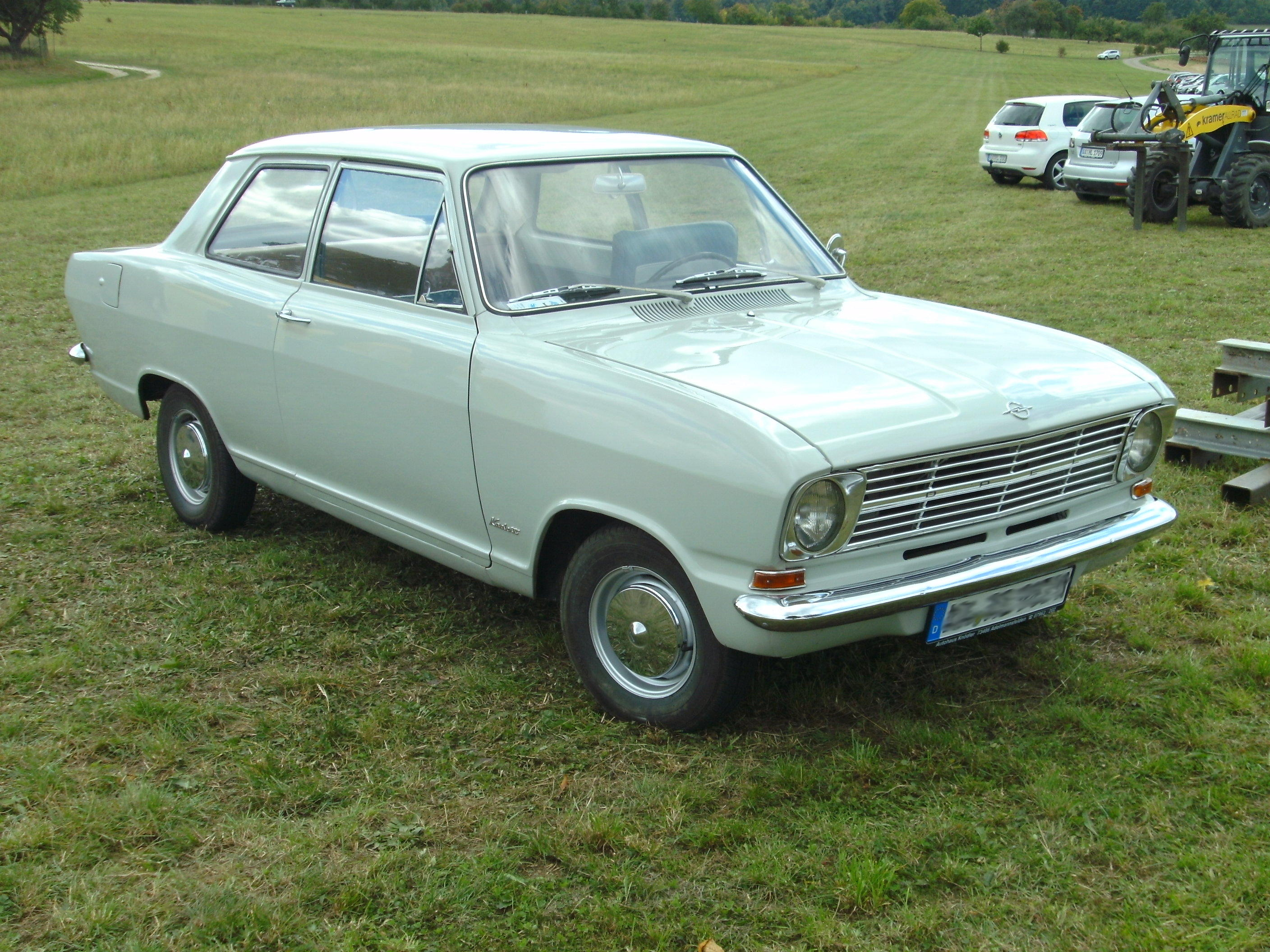
- Opel Kadett B 2-door Limousine

Overview
- Manufacturer: Opel (General Motors)
- Production: 1965–1973
- Assembly: West Germany: Bochum; Johor Bahru, Malaysia (Capital Motor)

Body and chassis
- Class: Small family car (C)
- Body style: 2/4-door notchback / fastback saloon; 3/5-door "Car-A-Van" estate; 2-door coupé
- Related: Opel Olympia A

Powertrain
- Engine: petrol: 1972–73: 993 cc ohv I4 (export); 1965–73: 1078 cc ohv I4; 1971–73: 1196 cc ohv I4; 1967–70: 1492 cc CIH I4 (export); 1967–70: 1698 cc CIH I4; 1967–73: 1897 cc CIH I4

Dimensions
- Wheelbase: 2,416 mm (95.1 in)
- Length: 4,100 mm (160 in) (estate); 4,105 mm (161.6 in) (saloon); 4,182 mm (164.6 in) (coupé, fastback)
- Width: 1,573 mm (61.9 in)
- Height: 1,274–1,405 mm (50.16–55.31 in) (depending on wheel size and body type)

Chronology
- Predecessor: Opel Kadett A
- Successor: Opel Kadett C

The Opel Kadett B is a car that was launched by Opel at the Frankfurt Motor Show in late summer 1965. The Kadett B was larger all-round than the Kadett A: 5% longer both overall and in terms of the wheelbase, 7% wider and 9% heavier (unladen weight), albeit 10 mm (0.39 in) lower in basic standard "Limousine" (saloon) form. Production ended in July 1973, with the successor model introduced a month later following the summer shutdown, in August. Unlike its predecessor, it bore no relation to the Vauxhall Viva, which had moved to its own platform for its corresponding second generation.

== Bodies: more choice ==
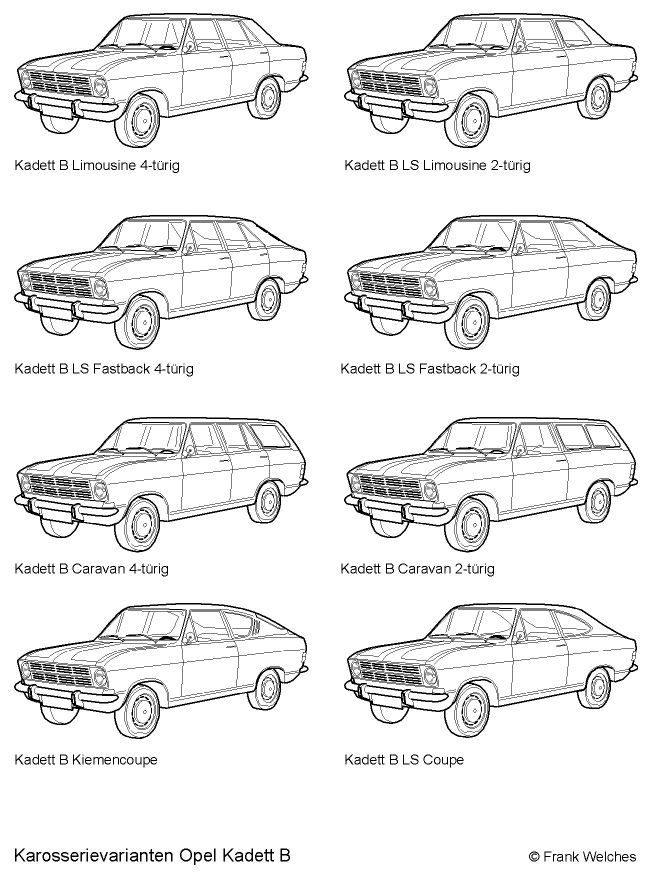
Opel Kadett B body options

Opel had built a reputation for providing stylish cars, and the simple well balanced proportions of the recently introduced Opel Rekord Series A had continued the tradition. The unapologetic slab-sided functionalism of the Kadett B disappointed some commentators. However, customers were not deterred, possibly because the simple car body enabled the car to provide an aggressively priced practical and modern car with far more interior space than the Volkswagen which hitherto had dominated the German small car market without serious challenge for more than a decade.

The range of bodies was widened with the Kadett B. The entry-level model, priced in September 1965 at 5,175 Marks, was the two-door "Limousine" (saloon). In addition, for the first time since 1940, it was again possible to buy a four-door Kadett "Limousine". In September 1967 a fast back "Limousine" model, designated as the "Kadett LS" and offered with two or four doors, joined the range.

A three-door "Car-A-Van" (estate) was offered from the 1965 launch, with a five-door "Car-A-Van" added to the range in 1967.

Opel also offered a two-door Kadett coupé with reduced headroom for the passengers in the rear. The coupé body introduced in 1965 included a thick C-pillar with reduced side-windows between the C-pillar and the B-pillar. The thick C-pillar incorporated three prominent air extractor slots reminiscent of the gills on a fish, as a result of which this coupé acquired the soubriquet "Kiemencoupé" (gills coupé). A coupé body with larger side windows for the passengers in the back appeared in 1967 identified as the "Coupé F", initially only on the more lavishly equipped cars, but from 1971 all Kadett B coupés used the newer body. The newer Coupé, with an increased quantity of glass, was slightly heavier than the "gills-coupé" as well as being less aerodynamically efficient, leading to a small reduction in claimed top speed.

== Engines ==
=== Smaller OHV engines ===
==== 1.1-litre (1965–1973) ====
At launch, and for the next two years till September 1967, all Kadett Bs were fitted with an OHV four-cylinder "over-square" water-cooled engine. The unit followed the architecture of the 993 cc engine first seen in the 1962 Kadett A, from which it was a development. Both engines featured a 61 mm (2.4 in) cylinder stroke, but for the engine in the Kadett B, generally referred to as a 1.1-litre or 1,100 cc unit, the bore was increased by 3 to 75 mm (0.12 to 2.95 in), which made it even more over-square and resulted in a capacity increase to 1,078 cc. There were as before two levels of power: stated output for the standard engine was 45 PS (33 kW) at 5,000 rpm, while the "high-compression" engine, listed as the "1100 S" motor, produced 55 PS (40 kW) at 5,400 rpm. Both engine versions were fitted with a Solex 35 PDSI carburetor, but the higher compression ratio on the 55 PS (40 kW; 54 hp) unit necessitated the use of higher octane "super grade" fuel. There was also a "low-compression" 40 PS (29 kW) version of this engine used for certain export markets outside western Europe where available fuel came with a significantly lower octane rating than was normal for "regular" grade fuel in Germany.

In September 1967, as part of a larger proliferation of engine and trim options, a more powerful version of the 1,078 cc engine became available, listed as the "1100 SR" motor, fitted with two Solex 35 PDSI carburetors and providing a maximum output of 60 PS (44 kW; 59 hp) at 5,200 rpm. The compression ratio was further raised, now to 9.2:1 and fitting the 60 PS (44 kW; 59 hp) unit raised the claimed top speed to 140 km/h (87 mph) as against 125 and 135 km/h (78 and 84 mph) for the 45 and 55 PS (33 and 40 kW; 44 and 54 hp) powered Kadetts.

However, the early 1970s saw increasing awareness of the dangers to health arising from lead being added to road fuel, and the oil companies responded to the resulting political and regulatory pressures by reducing both the levels of lead in fuel and the availability at filling stations of higher octane petrol/gasoline. High-compression versions of the Opel 1,078 cc engine were therefore withdrawn from August 1971, leaving just a 50 PS (37 kW; 49 hp) unit which used the 7.8:1 compression ratio that had been used in the base version back in 1965, delivering a reduced torque (presumably as art of a tradeoff against higher power output). Between August 1971 and July 1973 the niche hitherto occupied by the higher-compression 1,078 cc units was filled by a newly bored out 1,196 cc version of what was, in other respects, the engine much as before.

By the time the Kadett B was replaced in 1973 there had been no fewer than six differently sized engines available for it from Opel: by far the most popular was the 1,078 cc motor that powered 89% (2.3 million of 2.6 million) of the Kadett Bs produced.

==== 1.2-litre (1971–1973) ====
The 1.2-litre unit that, in the Kadett B, replaced in August 1971 the higher-compression versions of the 1.1-litre motor was listed as the "1200 S" motor. It retained the 61 mm (2.4 in) cylinder stroke of the original version of this engine, but the cylinder bore was further increased, giving an overall engine capacity of 1,196 cc and maximum output of 60 PS (44 kW; 59 hp) at 5,400 rpm.

Only 95,000 Kadett Bs were fitted with the 1.2-litre engine which nevertheless went on to power successor Kadett and Corsa models until 1993. In the shorter term, in March 1972 this became the entry level power unit for base level versions of the recently introduced Opel Ascona and Manta models.

==== 1.0-litre (export only: 1972-1973) ====
In 1972 and 1973 Opel produced 10,000 Kadett Bs powered by the 993 cc original version of the engine that ten years earlier had powered the Kadett A. Maximum output, as previously, was 40 or 48 PS (29 or 35 kW; 39 or 47 hp) according to the compression ratio selected. This engine was not fitted in cars destined for the domestic market, but was used for cars sold in export markets, primarily Italy, where annual car tax rates increased very considerably for cars fitted with engines of above 1.0 litre. Kadetts assembled in South Africa received a 997 cc Vauxhall engine and transmission.

==== 1.2-litre Vauxhall engine (South Africa) ====
From circa 1966, General Motors South Africa built the Kadett B locally. However, to meet local parts content rules it was fitted with Vauxhall's 1159 cc inline-four as also seen in the Viva. This engine offered 56.2 or 67 bhp (42 or 50 kW; 57 or 68 PS) in a high output version; the outputs are in Gross bhp. These local variants were also sold in South-West Africa (today's Namibia). From the second half of 1968, the four-door Car-A-Van model was added, alongside the updates to the rear suspension.

=== Larger Opel cam-in-head engines ===
==== 1.7-litre (1967–1970) ====
In 1967 Ford added a 1.7-litre version to their Ford 12M/15M range. Both the Kadett and the Ford by now took up more road space than a typical European 1.1-litre small family saloon, and in September 1967 Opel added a 1,698 cc engine to the Kadett's range of available power units. A suitable unit already existed, having been fitted in the Opel Rekord since 1965. The engine in question had been the manufacturer's second all-new engine design since the war, although much of its underlying philosophy came from General Motors developments in Detroit and from experience with the new engine developed for the Kadett A earlier in the 1960s. The Opel cam-in-head engine followed the trends of the time in replacing side-valves with an overhead valvegear configuration, which was no doubt facilitated by the over-square architecture of the cylinder block: the engine also carried its camshaft directly above the cylinders. However, instead of operating directly on the cylinder valves, the camshaft still operated the valves using rods and rocker arms because, unusually (except within general Motors) the camshaft itself was positioned too low above the cylinders to permit direct action from the camshaft on the valves. One reason for this may have been cosmetic. Opel's CIH engine configuration enabled a succession of Opels to feature the low bonnet/hood lines that style-conscious product development departments favoured. As on the smaller Kadett engines with their side-mounted camshafts, the "in head" camshaft on the Opel CIH engine was chain driven, a weight-saving option which reduced lumpiness and friction at higher engine speeds when compared with the gear-cogs which had been used to drive camshafts in the previous generation of Opel engines.

The engine, known as the 1.7S or 1700S, was listed for the Kadett only for three years, between September 1967 and August 1970. The lower-compression 60 PS (44 kW; 59 hp) version fitted in many Rekords was not offered to Kadett buyers. In the Kadett B the engine provided a maximum output of 75 PS (55 kW; 74 hp) employing a relatively high 9.5:1 compression ratio. That translated, in manual transmission cars, into a top speed of 153 or 155 km/h (95 or 96 mph) according to body type. Despite its being listed for three years, only 6,000 Kadetts with the 1,698 cc engine were produced, suggesting that the manufacturer preferred to fit engines of this size in their larger Rekord model (which between 1966 and 1971 took more than half a million of the 1,698 cc units), while persuading Kadett customers looking for more power to switch their preference to the (in most respects similar) 1,897 cc version of the CIH engine.

==== 1.9-litre (1967–1973) ====
Also listed from 1967, and fitted in 143,000 Kadett Bs was the 1,897 cc version of the (CIH) engine. Again, only the high-compression version of the engine was listed for the Kadett, providing maximum output of 90 PS (66 kW; 89 hp) at 5,100 rpm, using a 9.5:1 compression ratio. After August 1971 the compression ratio was reduced to 9.0:1 due to the reduction in octane levels available at filling stations. In practice, though the engine was listed for the Kadett B until 1973, very few of the Kadetts produced in 1972 and 1973 were fitted with it as the focus of dealers' and customers' attention switched to the manufacturer's newer Ascona and Manta models.

The 1.9-litre engine was fitted in the top of the range "Opel Rallye Kadett" as an alternative to the smaller high-compression 1.2-litre engine also offered for this sportingly attired variant, readily identifiable from the thick black side stripe and the black paint on the lid of the bonnet/hood.

In Germany the "1900 S" engine was offered only in the coupé-bodied "Opel Rallye Kadett" although for certain export markets, notably the US, this engine was available in all body versions offered.

Between April 1970 and the end of the Kadett B's model life a more highly tuned "HL" („Hochleistung“/"High powered") version of the 1.9-litre engine could be fitted to a Rallye Sprint version of the car, power further increased to 106 PS (78 kW; 105 hp). "Hochleistung" cars could be purchased from Opel dealers and from at least one specialist engine tuning business, but they never appeared on Opel price lists in Germany where the cars were always rare. The 106 PS (78 kW; 105 hp) powered Kadett B Rallye Sprint was less of a rarity in Sweden where a high proportion of the cars produced were sold.

==== 1.5-litre (export only: 1967-1970) ====
The smallest of Opel's (CIH) engines never found its way into Kadetts for the domestic market, but the 1,492 cc unit was installed in 44,000 Kadett saloons and estates destined for export between 1967 and 1970, primarily for Austria, Finland, Sweden and the USA (where it was only offered for the 1968 model year). The version fitted in the Kadetts was a 65 PS (48 kW; 64 hp) high-compression unit.

== Running gear ==
=== Transmission ===
The car came with a four-speed all-synchromesh manual transmission as standard, gear selection being performed using a centrally positioned floor-mounted lever. From November 1968 on the larger-engined cars, and from February 1969 also on the smaller-engined Kadetts, it became possible to specify the alternative of a "GM Strasbourg" Turbo-Hydramatic 180 three-speed automatic transmission, available at the extra cost (initially) of 800 Marks.

=== Brakes ===
The Kadett B was the first Kadett to offer disc brakes on the front wheels. 238 mm (9.4 in) diameter disc brakes at the front came included as standard fittings on all but the cheapest versions, complemented by 200 mm (7.9 in) diameter drum brakes at the back. The brakes were controlled hydraulically. From February 1967 the single hydraulic braking circuit was replaced by a dual circuit braking system: this built in reserve of redundancy in the braking control system reflected a growing interest in primary and secondary safety which was becoming a feature of German auto-design in the 1960s. Whether as an option on the base model or as a standard feature across the rest of the range, where disc brakes were fitted Opel also included servo-assistance in the braking system from February 1967.

=== Steering and suspension ===
The Kadett B inherited its suspension from the Kadett A. Two years after launch, however, in August 1967, the simple longitudinally mounted leaf springs with a centrally connected rigid axle which till then had suspended the rear wheels were replaced with a more sophisticated setup incorporating coil springs, trailing arms and a Panhard rod. Road holding was usefully improved. At the same time, reflecting growing preoccupation with secondary safety in the marketplace, the old steering wheel was replaced with a padded "Safety" steering wheel, now mounted on a telescopic steering column which was designed to collapse in the event of a serious collision.

== Versions and trim levels ==
=== Standard models ===
The basic car was known simply as the Opel Kadett or the "standard", but for a few hundred Marks more customers could choose the Opel Kadett L with a less spartan interior and a little more chrome on the outside, along with over-riders on the bumpers. When the fastback saloon was offered, between 1967 and 1970, it was identified as the Kadett LS. Beginning in 1968, French customers were also offered the Kadett XE, an even more stripped-down version of the Kadett, fitted with the 1100 cc engine and priced at 6,666 New Francs (equivalent to €9,600 in 2025).

=== Rallye Kadett ===
The Rallye Kadett was offered only with the coupé body, which it combined with the twin carburettor “SR” version of the 1.1-litre engine (between 1965 and 1971) or the high-compression 1.9-litre engine (between 1967 and 1973). The Rallye Kadett came with twin halogen driving lights and, on the inside, a black panel of rocker switches as part of the dashboard along with black synthetic leather seat coverings. It also came with matte black panels on the bonnet/hood ("to reduce reflection") and black stripes along the side. Customers worried by the flamboyant look of all the black paint could order a Rallye Kadett without it, but very few Rallye Kadett buyers opted for the “understated” paintwork option.

=== Opel Olympia ===
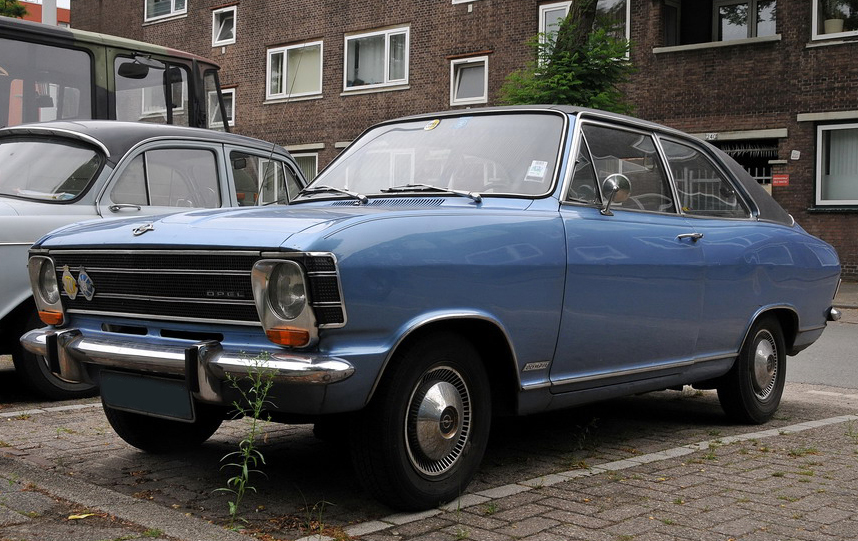
1968 Opel Olympia 2-door saloon, with the standard vinyl roof

The Olympia name was revived in 1967. This time it was only a luxury version of the contemporary Opel Kadett B. Interior finishings were of a higher order than in the Kadett. Engines were an 1100 cc unit with 60 PS (44 kW) taken from the Kadett and two larger units, a 1700 cc with 75 PS (55 kW) and a 1900 cc with 90 PS (66 kW) which were normally used in the Opel Rekord. The bodywork was of the "fastback" style, rather than of the more upright regular saloon-style bodywork used on most Kadetts. The Olympia was not highly successful and was replaced in 1970 by the all new Opel Ascona.

=== Limited edition "run-out" specials ===
The Kadett B was in production for 8 years, which represented a longer production run than was achieved by any other Kadett before or subsequently. This freed up the manufacturer to focus new model development on the important Ascona and Manta models which appeared in 1970. The Kadett B's strong marketplace performance was helped by the lukewarm reception German buyers gave to the Ford Escort which in its original incarnation German buyers perceived as cramped, crude and uncomfortable. At the end of 1972, with rumours of a replacement appearing in the trade press, Opel nevertheless felt it necessary to prepare a series of special edition Opel Kadetts with a number of "options" included as standard features, but with little chance for customers to vary the specifications. By building large batches of identically equipped cars the manufacturer was able to provide attractively low prices to customers prepared to forego the chance to specify their Kadett "à la carte" from the colour, trim and options lists. Forty years on, some of the options listed have become standard on cars of this class, while others have fallen completely out of favour.

The limited edition cars were built and sold for the 1973 model year, which was the Kadett B's run-out (or final) year.

==== Kadett Sport (1973) ====
The special edition Kadett Sport came with matte black exterior decor reminiscent of the Kadett Rallye, but whereas the Kadett Rallye came with a coupé body the Kadett-Sport used only the two-door "Limousine" saloon body. Also the recommended price was 1,171 Marks (12%) lower than for the similarly powered 1.2-litre 60 PS (44 kW; 59 hp) Kadett Rallye.

The Kadett-Sport buyer could specify any one of three eye-catching body colours: "roof-tile red", "yellow ochre" and "lemon yellow" (Ziegelrot, Ocker und Citrusgelb). Appropriate features included in the "customer-friendly" price were a sports exhaust/muffler, the rallye gauge cluster from the Rallye model, a sports steering wheel, servo assisted brakes with discs at the front, antiroll bars, high-backed front seats, sports wheels and tires, a heated rear window, seat belts and, under the bonnet, an enhanced alternator to cope with the anticipated demands of additional electrical equipment.

==== Kadett Holiday (1973) ====
The special edition Kadett Holiday came with a standard package of extras, chief among which were a steel sliding sun roof, sports wheels, large fog lights at the front and a rear fog light, and high-backed front seats incorporating stylish wrap-around head restraints.

==== Kadett Festival (1973) ====
The most luxuriously equipped of the special edition Kadetts of 1973, the Festival could be purchased as a Limousine (saloon) or as a Coupé. The cars were powered by the 60 PS (44 kW; 59 hp) 1.2S engine, and for approximately an extra 500 Marks the 3-speed automatic "Strasbourg" transmission could be specified.

The Kadett-Festival buyer could choose from three fashionably metallic body colours: "sahara gold", "monza blue" and "lime green". "Extras" included as standard features in the "friendly" price were velour covered seats exclusive to the Kadett Festival, a sports steering wheel, front disc brakes packaged with servo-assistance for the brakes, antiroll bars front and rear, a more powerful alternator than on most Kadetts, halogen spot lamps, a heated back window, sports wheels with radial tires and the external decoration of thin twin side-stripes.

==== Kadett Grand Prix (1973) ====
The Kadett Grand Prix was a special edition Kadett using the two-door Limousine (saloon) body with its interior enhanced by the fitting of carpets, a sports steering wheel and 3-point mounted seatbelts. Under the bonnet/hood, there was an uprated alternator. The 3-speed automatic transmission could be ordered as an extra.

For most of the run-out specials, customers were restricted to a choice of three body colours, but Grand Prix buyers could choose from between roof-tile red, yellow ochre, sierra beige and arctic white.

=== Export specials ===
==== Opel Ascona (modified Kadett B assembled in Biel, Switzerland) ====
The Opel Ascona 1700 should not be confused with the all-new Opel Ascona introduced in 1970. The "Opel Ascona" name was originally used for a 4-door "Limousine" (saloon)-bodied edition of the Kadett B powered by the manufacturer's 1,698 cc CIH high compression ratio "1.7S" engine. The interior was extensively modified, and incorporated several elements from the Kadett's "L" equipment package. Opel's first four Asconas came from the Kadett plant in Bochum, but all the rest of the 2,560 Kadett-based cars were assembled at Biel, near the Franco-German language frontier through central Switzerland, using imported components. General Motors had originally established their small auto-assembly facility in Biel in the 1930s as a reaction to a surge in trade protectionism which had been part of the political reaction in Europe and America to the economic depression of the early 1930s.

==== Mixed fortunes in the US ====
The Kadett B was sold in the United States through a large number of selected Buick dealers from 1966 until Autumn 1972 (72 models were imported only by special order by the dealer), branded simply as the Opel in the 1970 and 71 model years. The U.S. models from the 1968 model year were given the front end and trim similar to the new Opel Olympia but with the turn signals put into the grille beside the headlights (as opposed to under them like the Olympia). From 1969 additional lighting changes were made to include side marker lights. The 1968 had side marker reflectors on the front fender and larger wrap-around tail lights that were unique to the US Market to meet new US regulations. The US cars also received sealed-beam headlights at the front, and the car took part in the Trans-Am Series during its commercial life. The Kadett Bs, like the predecessor Kadett A, were technically simple cars whose task was to compete with the market leader, the Volkswagen Beetle. The mainstay of the US Kadett at this time was the coupé-bodied fast back and estate. Saloons and specifically the four-door saloon were offered only sporadically. In the case of the four door it was offered only in the 1967 (all 1.1 L with trim matching the European Opel Kadett of the time) and 1971 model years (all 1.9 L and less than 700 were imported and sold).

Roughly 430,000 Opel Kadett Bs were imported to the U.S.

The United States car magazine Car and Driver published a highly critical test of an Opel Kadett L 1500 Caravan in February 1968, featuring photos of the car in a junkyard. Reportedly, GM withdrew ads from that magazine for several months as a consequence.

== Commercial ==
Between 1965 and 1973 Opel produced 2,691,300 Kadett Bs making this model one of the most successful Opels to date in terms of sales volume. The Kadett benefitted on the domestic market from a progressive slowing of demand for the old Volkswagen Beetle, while the Ford Escort and Volkswagen Golf which would compete for sales more effectively against the Kadett C both got off to a relatively slow start respectively in 1968 and 1974.

== Derivatives ==
The two-seat Opel GT was heavily based on Kadett B components, its body made by a French contractor, Brissonneau & Lotz, at their Creil factory.

== Motorsport ==
The Kadett B was used in the 2000 cc category of the Trans-American Sedan Championship.

== Gallery ==
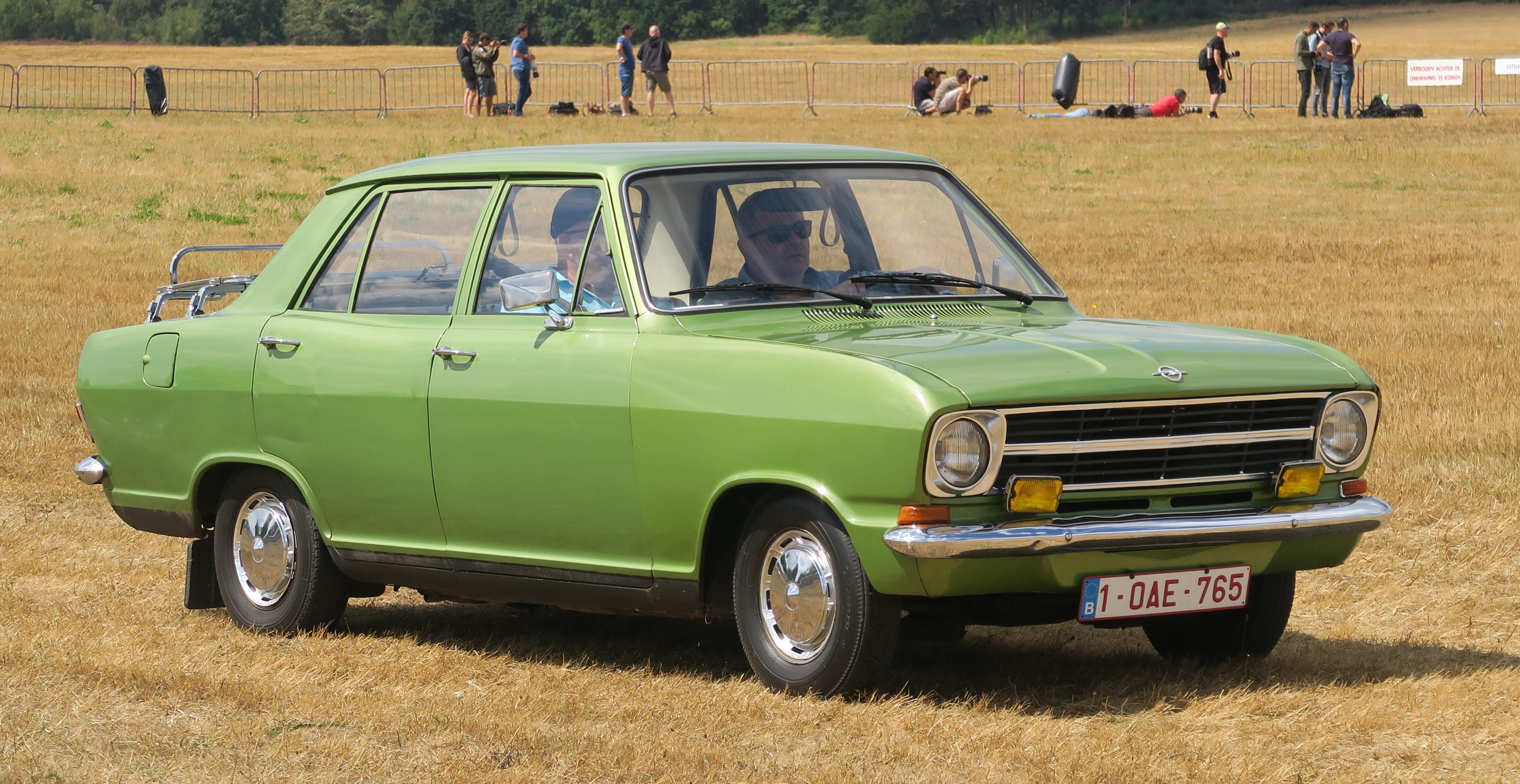
Opel Kadett B 4-door Saloon (Limousine)

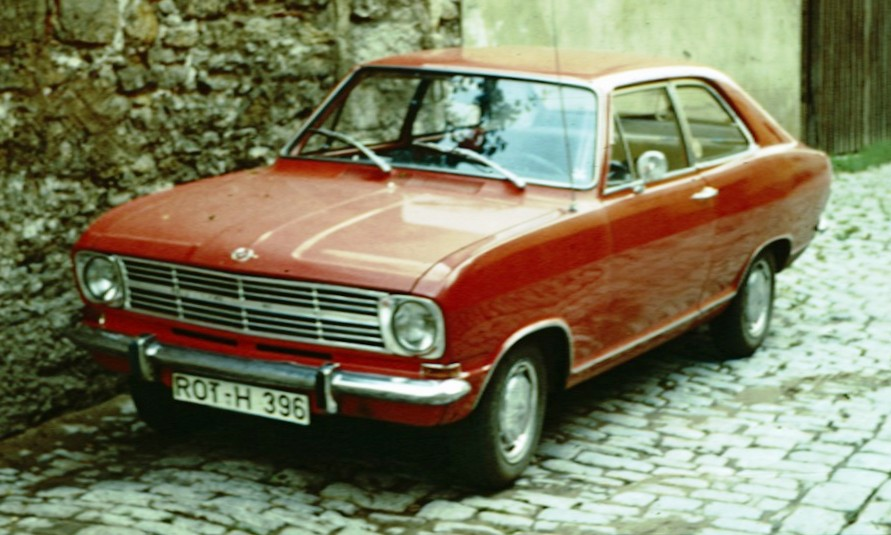
Opel Kadett B 2-door Fastback

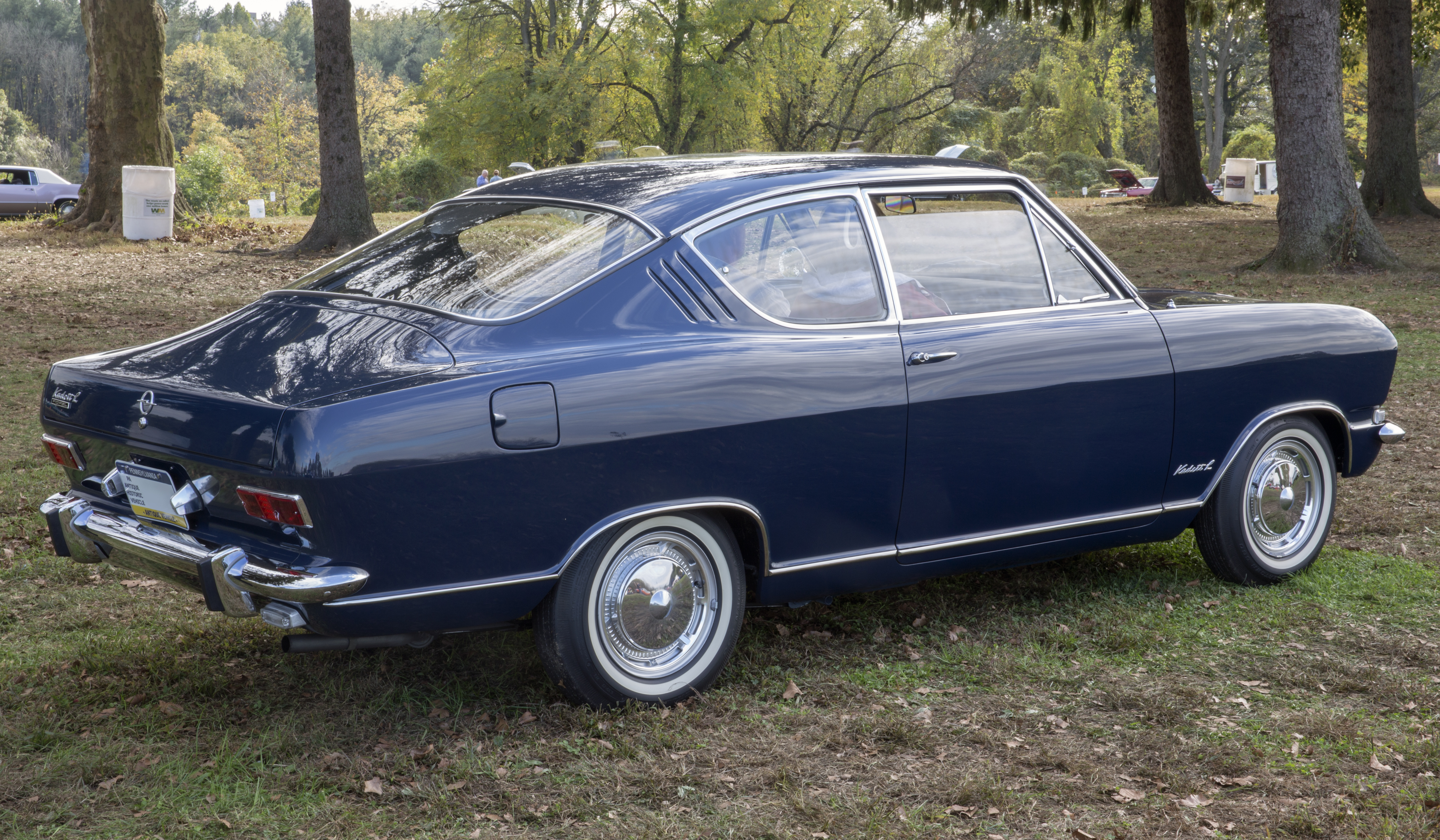
US-market 1967 Opel Kadett B "Gills-coupé" ("Kiemencoupé")

Opel Kadett B 4-door Limousine

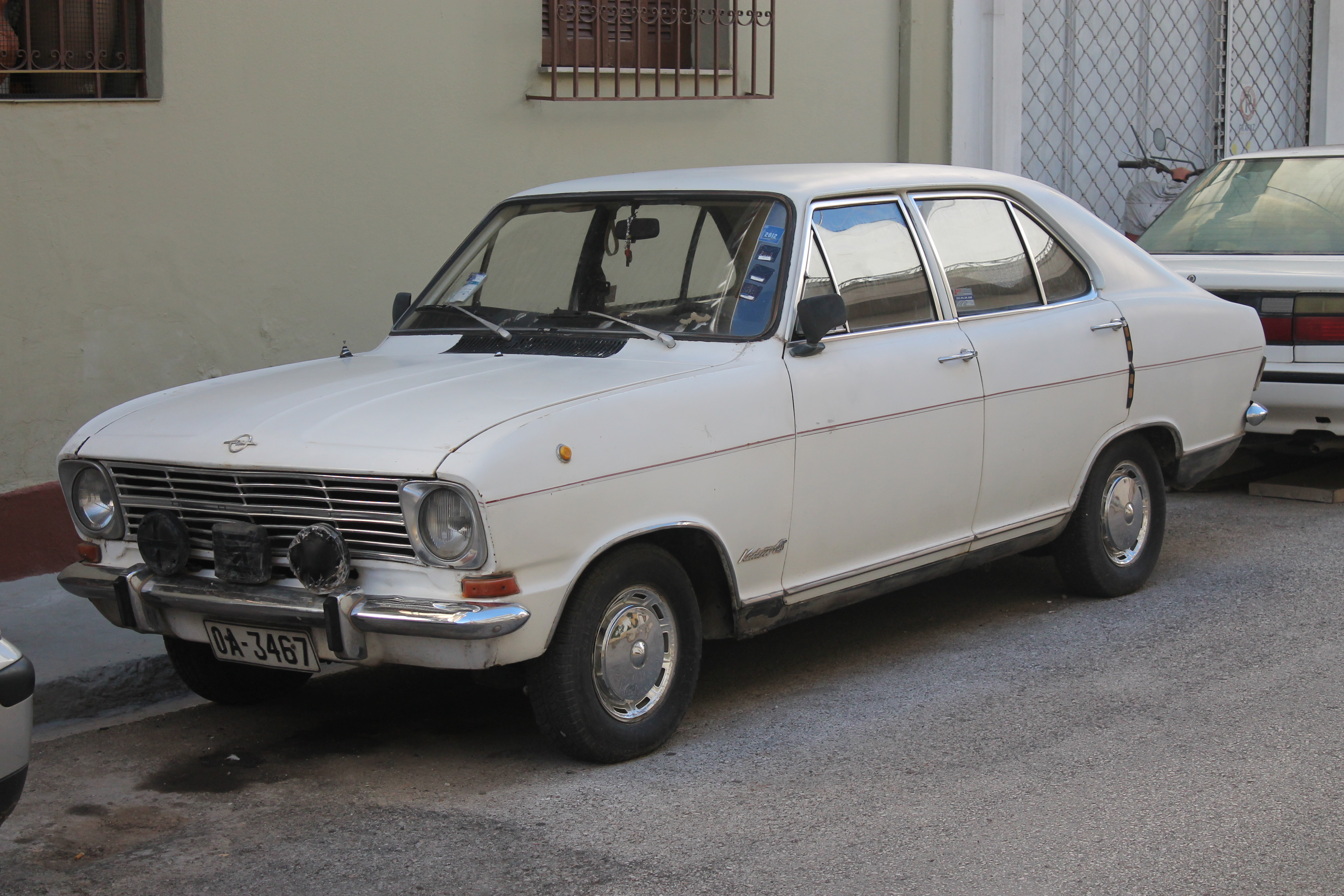
Opel Kadett B 4-door Fastback

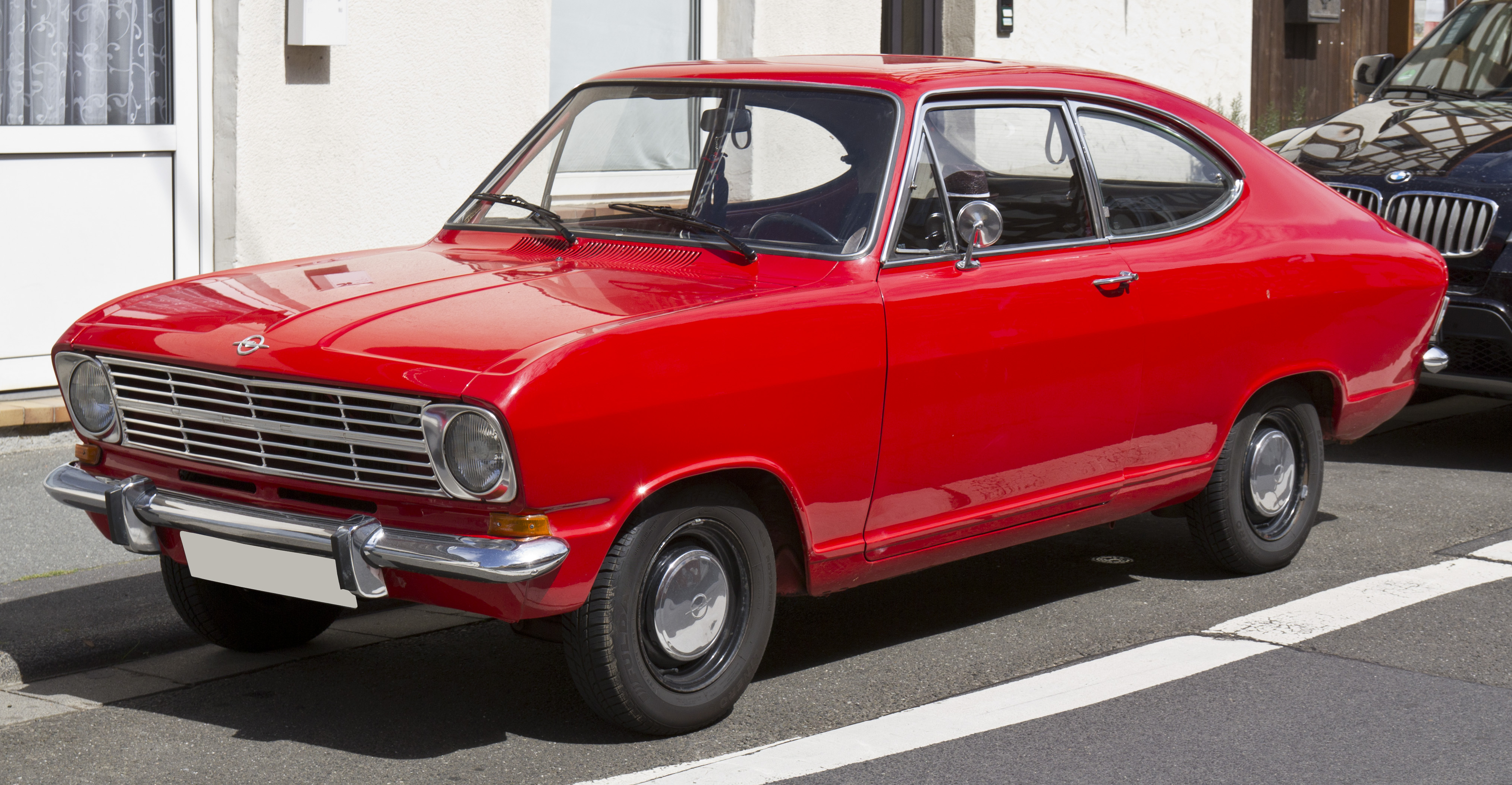
Opel Kadett B Coupé "F" (1967–73)

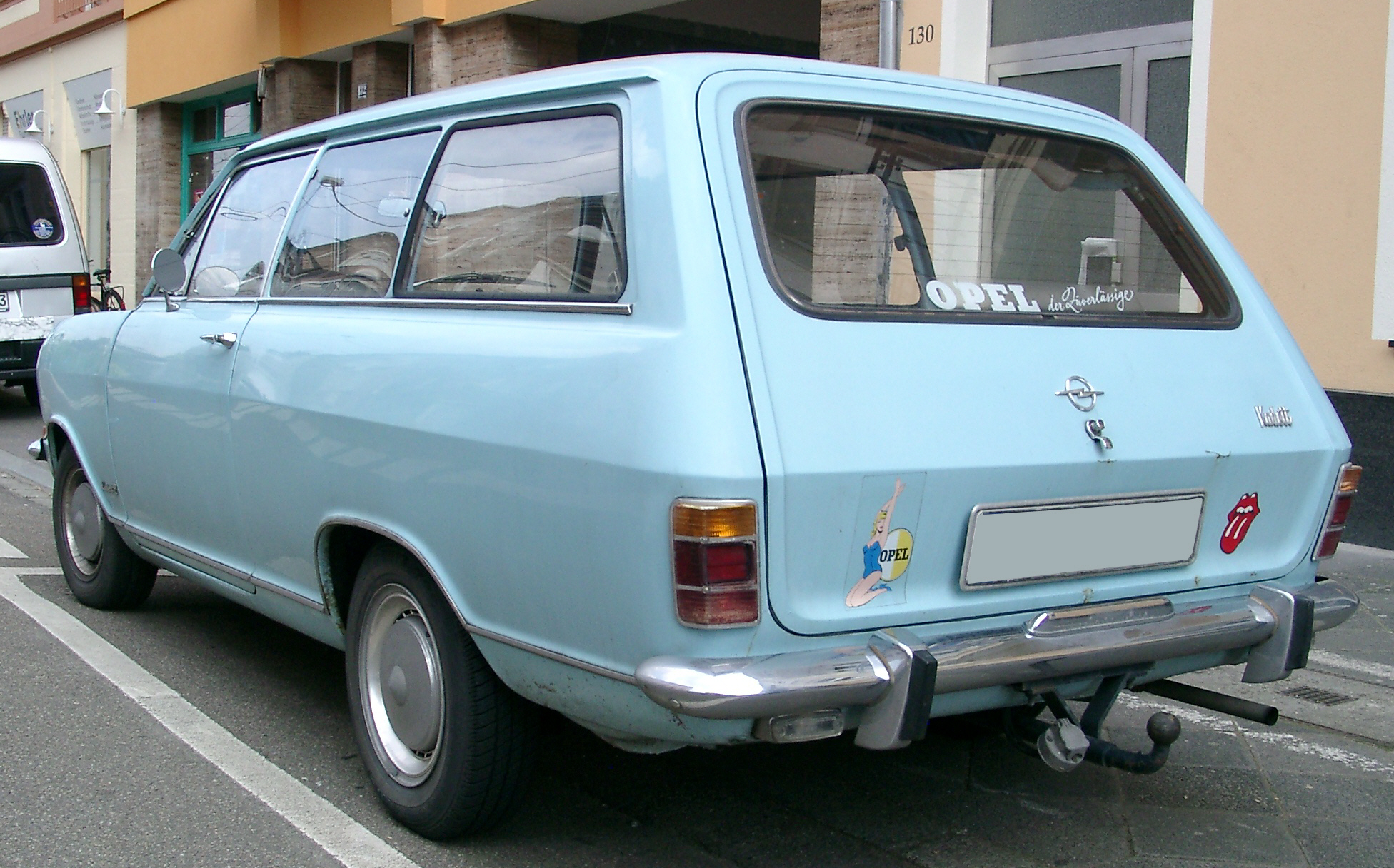
Rear-view of Opel Kadett B 3-door Caravan (Kombi) (1965–73)

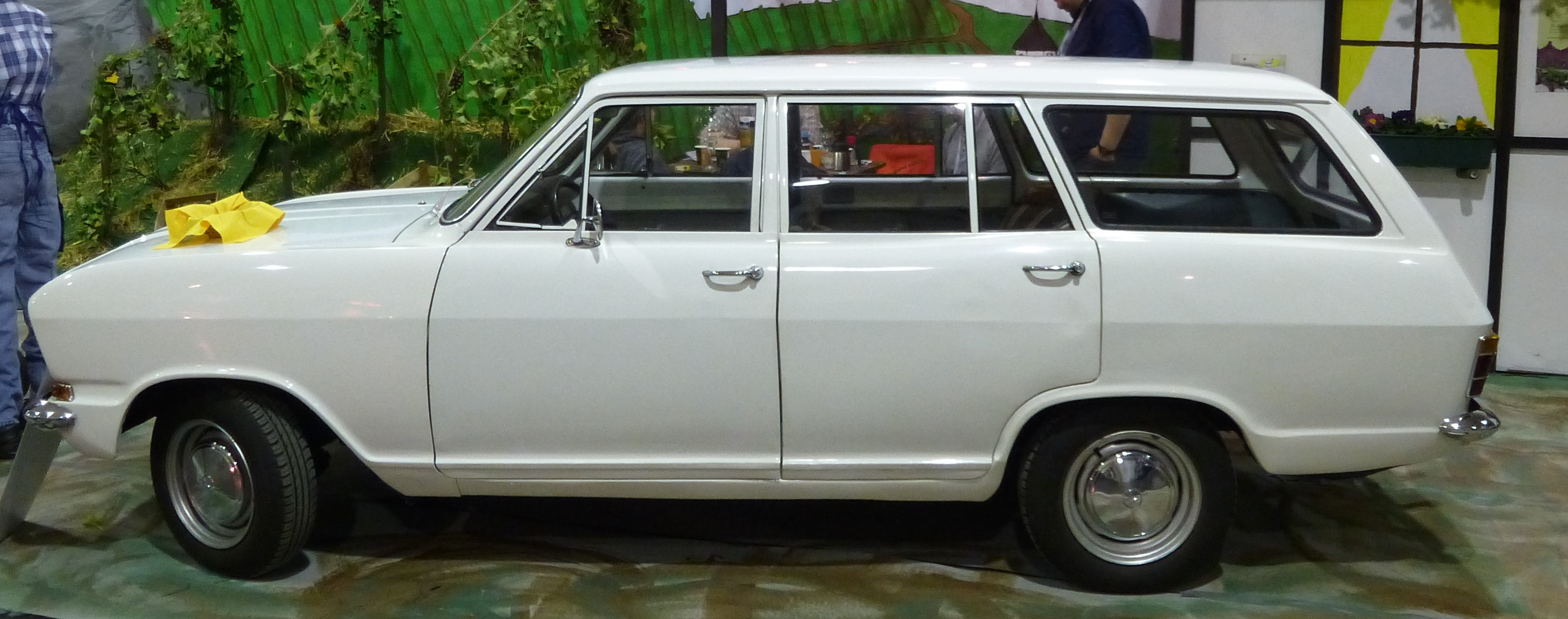
Opel Kadett B 5-door Car-A-Van (Estate)

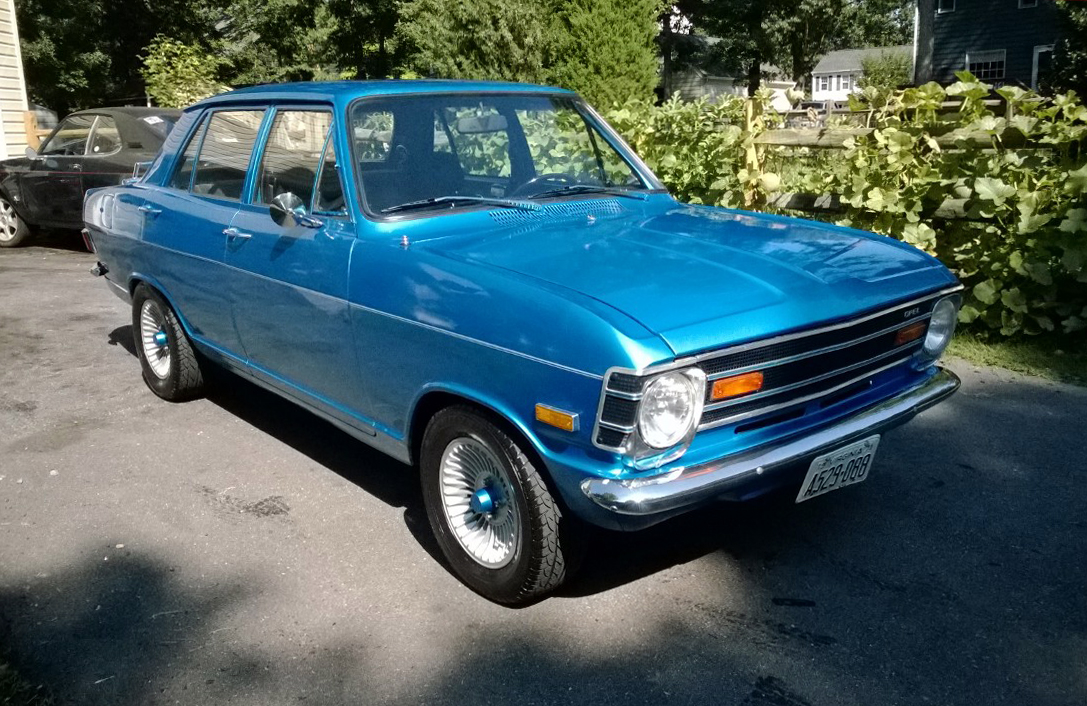
US-market 1971 Opel Kadett 36D (4 Door)

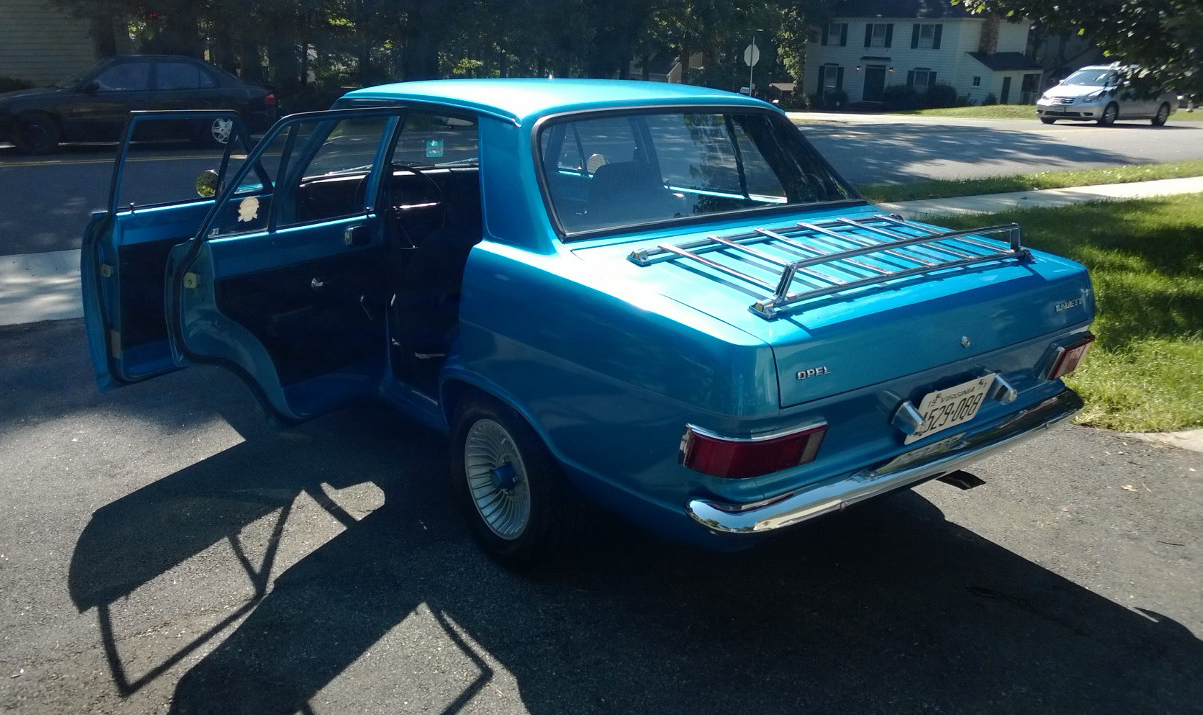
Rear view, showing the US-only tail lights used from 1969 until 1971
