= Opel Kadett A =

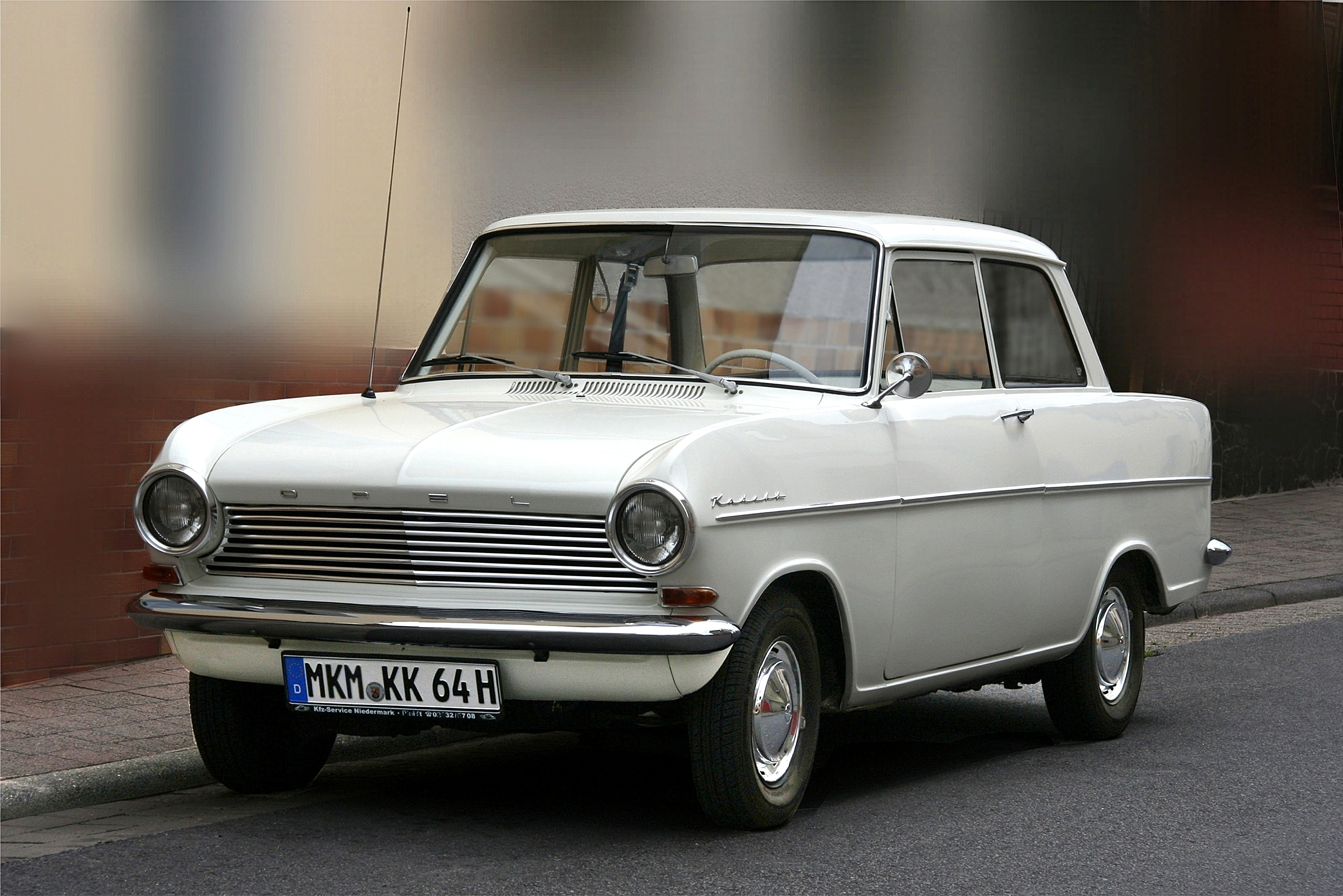

Overview
- Manufacturer: Opel (General Motors)
- Production: 1962–1965
- Assembly: Germany: Bochum

Body and chassis
- Class: Small family car (C)
- Body style: 2-door saloon 3-door Car-A-Van (estate); 2-door Coupé
- Layout: FR layout
- Related: Vauxhall Viva HA

Powertrain
- Engine: 993 cc 10N/S OHV I4
- Transmission: 4-speed manual all-synchromesh

Dimensions
- Wheelbase: 2,325 mm (91.5 in)
- Length: 3,923 mm (154.4 in) or 3,990 mm (157 in) ("L" models featuring bumper overriders)
- Width: 1,470 mm (58 in); 1,483 mm (58.4 in) (Car-A-Van)
- Height: 1,410 mm (56 in) (saloon); 1,397 mm (55.0 in) (coupé)

Chronology
- Predecessor: Opel Kadett I
- Successor: Opel Kadett B

The Opel Kadett was reintroduced by Opel in 1962, with deliveries beginning on 2 October, a little more than 22 years after the original model was discontinued in May 1940. Like the original Kadett, the new car (designated the "Kadett A") was a small family car, although it was now available in 2-door saloon, 3-door Car-A-Van (estate) and coupé versions.

== Origins ==
In 1957 Opel Product Director Karl Stief was mandated by General Motors headquarters in Detroit to develop "the perfect Anti-Volkswagen" ("einen perfekten Anti-VW"). The development team was headed up by Stief, supported by Hans Mersheimer (car-body) and Werner K. Strobel (engine and running gear), under conditions of such secrecy that even now very little is known of the development history of the 1962 Kadett. It has been alleged that GM was trying to conceal a new technique of platform and design sharing between Opel and its British sister company Vauxhall, which released the strikingly similar Viva HA in 1963, a year after Opel introduced the Kadett. The two cars were later revealed to have shared the same wheelbase, floorpan and elements of their inner body structure, suggesting that the allegation was indeed true. Over the subsequent two decades Opel and Vauxhall's ranges would rapidly converge as Vauxhall's design independence from Opel was eroded to the point where by 1985, Vauxhall's car range entirely consisted of rebadged Opel models.

Opel had been Germany's largest auto-producer in the 1930s, and in Wolfsburg the producers of the Kadett's principal target did not disguise their concern at the prospect of Opel's return to small car production. At the Volkswagen annual general meeting a few months before the launch of the Kadett, Volkswagen chairman Heinrich Nordhoff (who himself had been a senior manager with Opel in the 1930s and 1940s) went on record with a warning to shareholders that Opel (along with Ford Germany) were backed by a level of financial muscle on a scale unimaginable to any German company, and that it seemed that the two American transplants were now determined to use their financial strength to make aggressive inroads into the German auto-market at any price.

== New factory ==
A mark of General Motors' confidence in their plans for the small car sector, and something that the Opel Kadett and the Vauxhall Viva had in common, was that the manufacturer built for each new model a completely new car plant in a region characterized by relatively high unemployment and the availability of a skilled workforce, but with no strong tradition of volume auto-making. The Vauxhall Viva was the first car built at Vauxhall's Ellesmere Port plant while the Kadett A was the first product of Opel's new purpose-built Bochum plant. Ellesmere Port and Bochum would effectively become sister plants, producing subsequent generations of Kadett as well as their Vauxhall badged sisters (the Chevette and Astra) for the next fifty years.

In 2012, Opel announced the closure of the Bochum plant (now known as Plant Bochum II), effective 2016, with the loss of approximately 3,000 jobs, in response to the manufacturer's longstanding over capacity and loss of market share in key western European markets. Ellesmere Port in England became Opel's lead plant for the Astra/Kadett platform for subsequent generations.

== Bodies ==
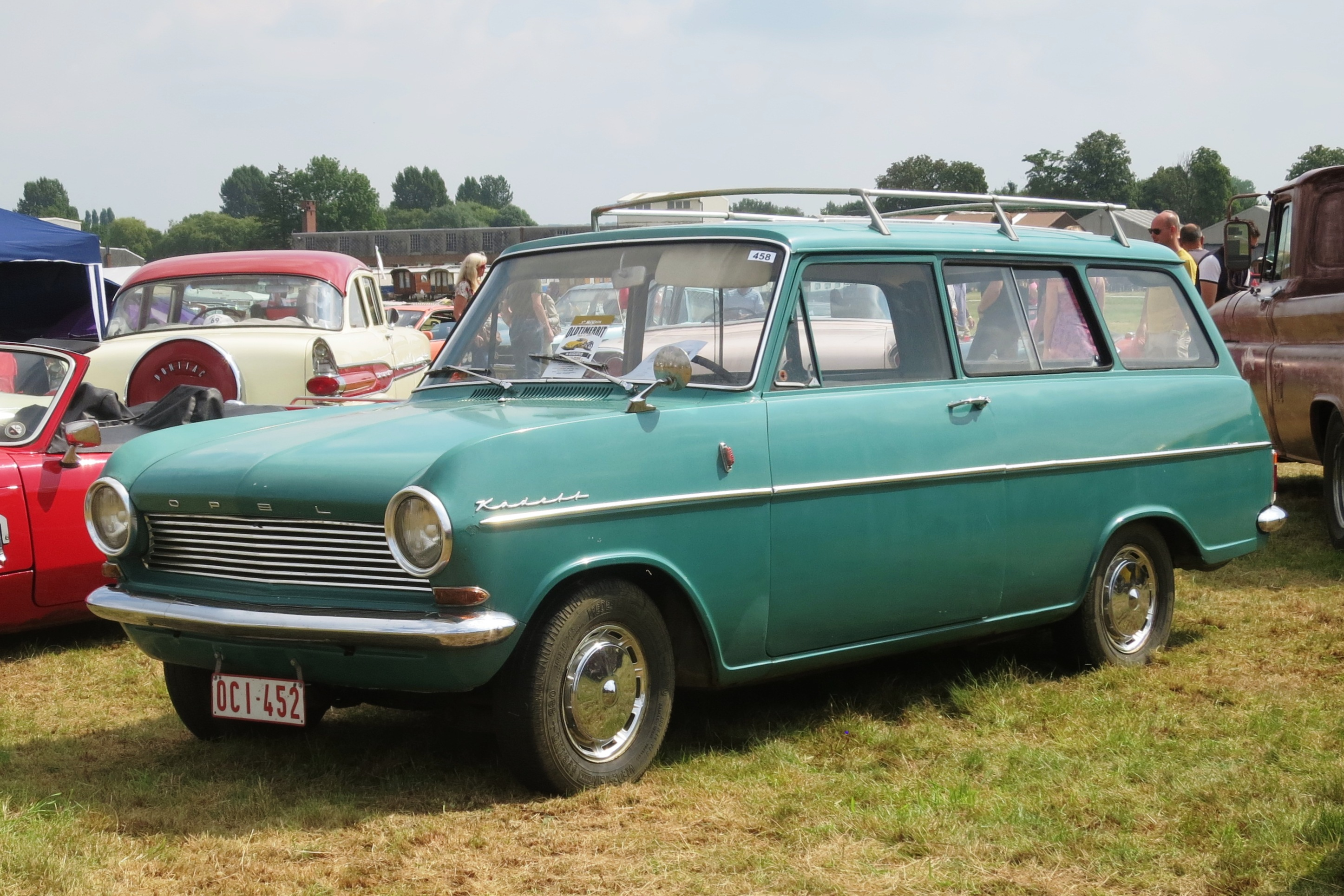
Kadett Car-A-Van

The car later became known as the Kadett A. In addition to the standard saloon, from March 1963, the manufacturer offered an L (luxury model) and an estate (branded as the "Opel Kadett Car-A-Van"). In October 1963 Opel introduced a coupé version of the Kadett with which buyers could enjoy enhanced style at the expense of rear seat headroom.

== Engines ==
The new four-cylinder, oversquare one-litre water-cooled Opel OHV engine weighed only 96 kg and was the first all-new engine developed by Opel since before the war. The side-mounted camshaft was driven not through gear-cogs but using a single chain with a hydraulic tensioner, the valve train employing rocker-arms and light-weight hollow rods. The arrangement was low on weight and on friction, permitting engine speeds above 6,000 rpm. The pistons were formed from an aluminium-alloy and incorporated a bimetal expansion strip to ensure uniform thermal expansion. The three-bearing forged crankshaft was of more traditional construction. The carefully designed aluminium inlet manifold provided for efficient feed of the fuel-mixture to the cylinders and helped provide the engine with good fuel economy characteristics.

The engine came with a choice from two power levels. For the standard 10N engine maximum output was listed as 40 PS (29 kW) at 5,000 rpm, and in October 1963 the high compression "1.0 S-Motor" (10S) was added, sharing the 993 cc capacity of the original power unit, but offering a maximum 48 PS (35 kW) of power at 5,400 rpm. The more powerful 10S engine also featured modifications to the inlet manifold, cylinders and camshaft along with a carburetor employing larger 36 mm (1.4 in) diameter than the 30 mm (1.2 in) used on the standard engine. This came with an 8.8:1 compression ratio whereas the 40 PS (29 kW; 39 hp) engine used a compression ratio of only 7.8:1. Higher compression ratios for performance versions of standard engines were a growing trend in West Germany in the 1960s, led by Opel and Ford, and made possible by the growing availability of higher octane "Super" grade fuel at filling stations.

The care taken over the detailed design of the new engine was rewarded with a power unit which earned widespread respect in the industry and, at least with the Kadett A, and indeed stayed with the next four generations of Kadett - finally ending with the entry level 1.2 litre version in the Kadett E. The 1.0 litre version of the engine was still being fitted to the Opel Corsa A (and its sister model the Vauxhall Nova) as late as 1992.

== Transmission and brakes ==
Power was transmitted to the rear wheels via a single dry-plate clutch and a four-speed all-synchromesh gear box, controlled using a conventional floor mount gear lever. There were 200 mm (7.9 in) brake drums on all four wheels: braking operated via a single circuit hydraulic system.

== Market reaction ==
The Kadett featured a more modern design than the Volkswagen Beetle that then dominated the market for small family cars in West Germany and various surrounding countries. The Kadett offered more passenger space, more luggage capacity, and better visibility for the driver. Its water-cooled engine provided effective heating for the passenger compartment. However, by the mid-1970s the Kadett's weakness was already apparent as the car's bodywork was not well protected from corrosion.

=== International sales ===
In addition to its West German home market, the Kadett A sold strongly in what were becoming the manufacturer's traditional export strongholds (notably in Benelux, Scandinavia, Austria and Switzerland). Between February 1964 and the Autumn/Fall of 1965 the cars were also exported to the United States where they were sold through approximately 500 Buick dealers (Opels were not sold in Canada which instead received Vauxhall models to take advantage of Commonwealth tariff preferences). The same 993 cc engine was fitted and it is not clear whether it was differently tuned for America: horsepower ratings were differently computed in the US, following locally devised "SAE" rules: for American market purposes the maximum outputs for the engines were quoted as 46 hp (34 kW; 47 PS) and 54 hp (40 kW; 55 PS).

== Production volumes ==
A total of 649,512 Kadett "A"s were built at the company's new Bochum factory by the time it was replaced by the Kadett "B" in July 1965. 126,616 of the cars produced were Car-A-Van bodied estate models, while the remaining 522,896 comprised a small number of coupés and approximately half a million saloons.

Year	1962	1963	1964	1965	Totals
Kadett	14,142	177,443	212,998	118,313	522,896
Caravan		31,685	61,372	33,559	126,616
Totals	14,142	209,128	274,370	151,872	649,512

Included in these figures are CKD kits shipped from Bochum to relatively small-scale GM plants for local assembly in South Africa, Denmark, Belgium, Portugal, Uruguay, Peru, and Venezuela.

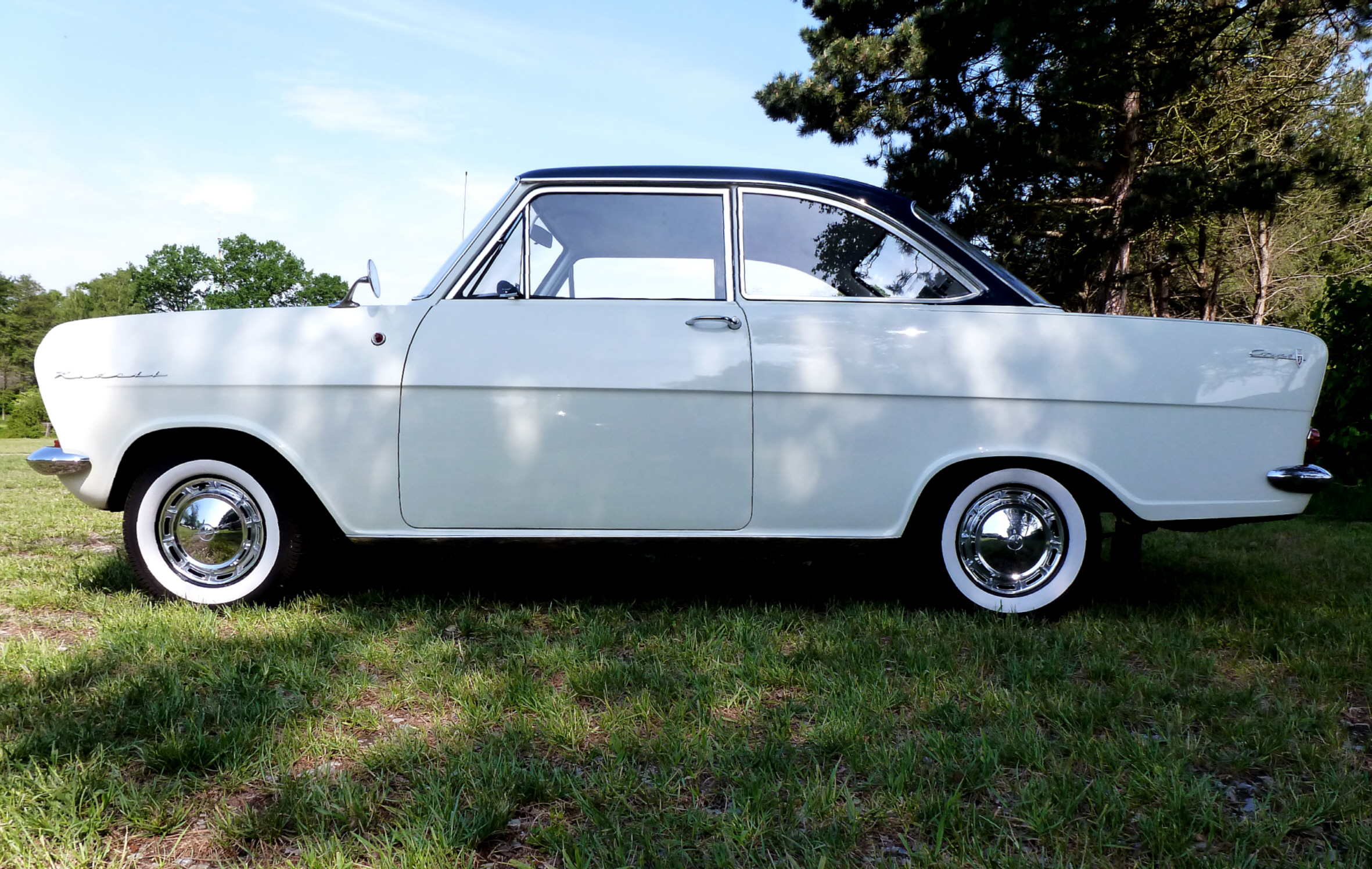
Opel Kadett Coupé (1962–1965)

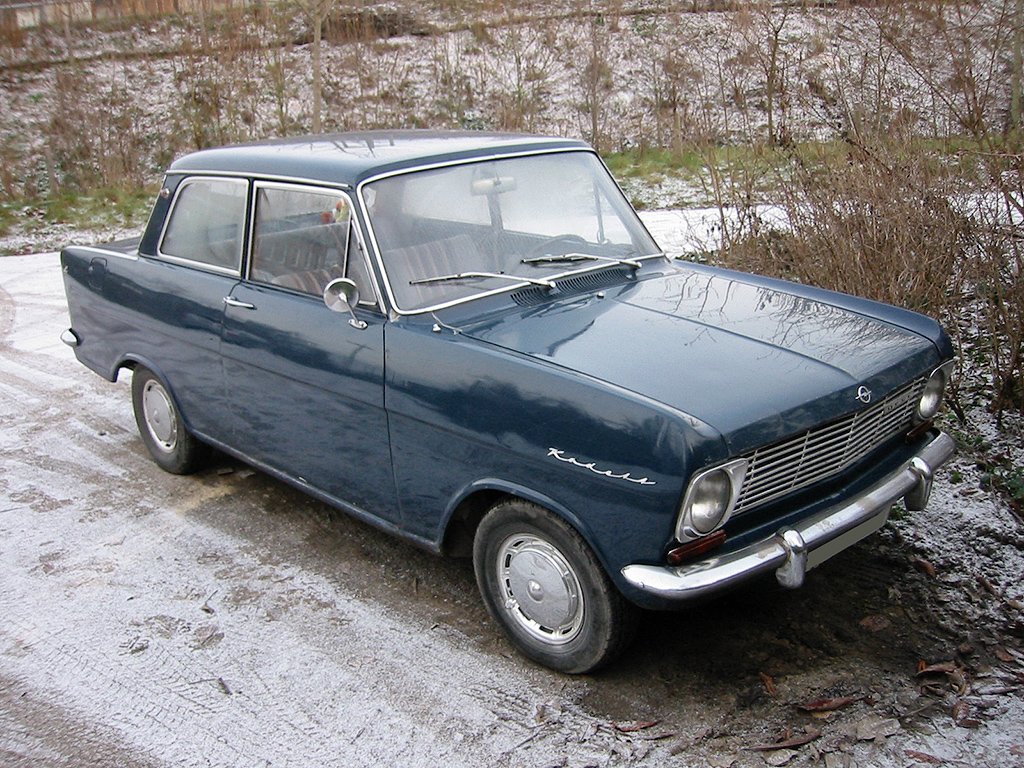
Opel Kadett L (1964–1965)

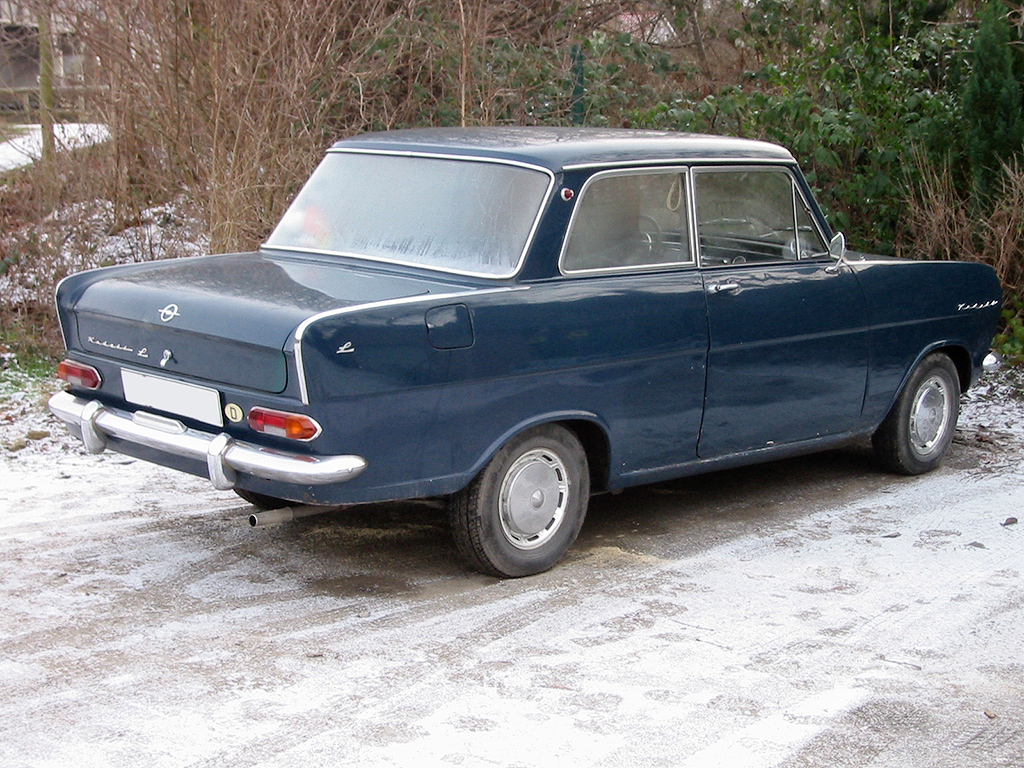
Rear

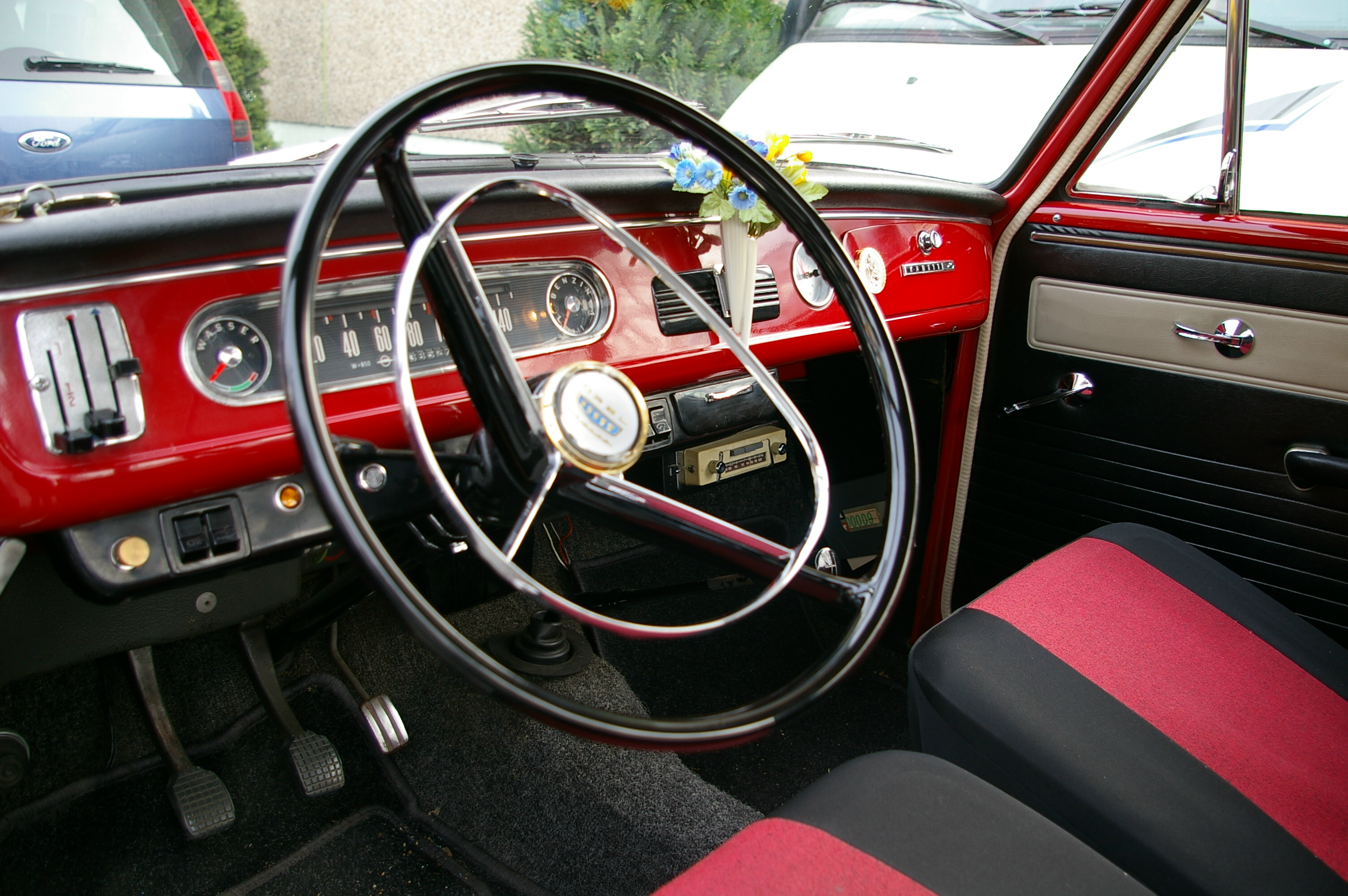
Dashboard

== Top Gear ==
On the British motoring show Top Gear, Richard Hammond drove a 1963 Kadett A through the middle of Botswana and across the Makgadikgadi Salt Pan. He loved the car so much that he named it "Oliver" and later had the car shipped to the United Kingdom and restored, and it remains in his possession. Hammond refused to alter the car in any way for the challenge in Botswana, despite James May and Jeremy Clarkson obeying the challenge criteria by stripping their cars bare to lighten the load. Oliver appeared on Richard Hammond's Blast Lab with the personalised number plate 'OL1 V3R'. The car also appeared in the Top Gear lorry challenge as one of the used obstacles.

In 2023, Hammond bought a second Opel Kadett A, which he named “Olivia” and he described this second Kadett as "Oliver's Girlfriend".

In 2024 he would buy a third Opel Kadett A, this one named 'Daphne' is an estate version of the standard, one he will be using to travel to Southern France.
