= Opel GT =

Sports car manufactured by Opel

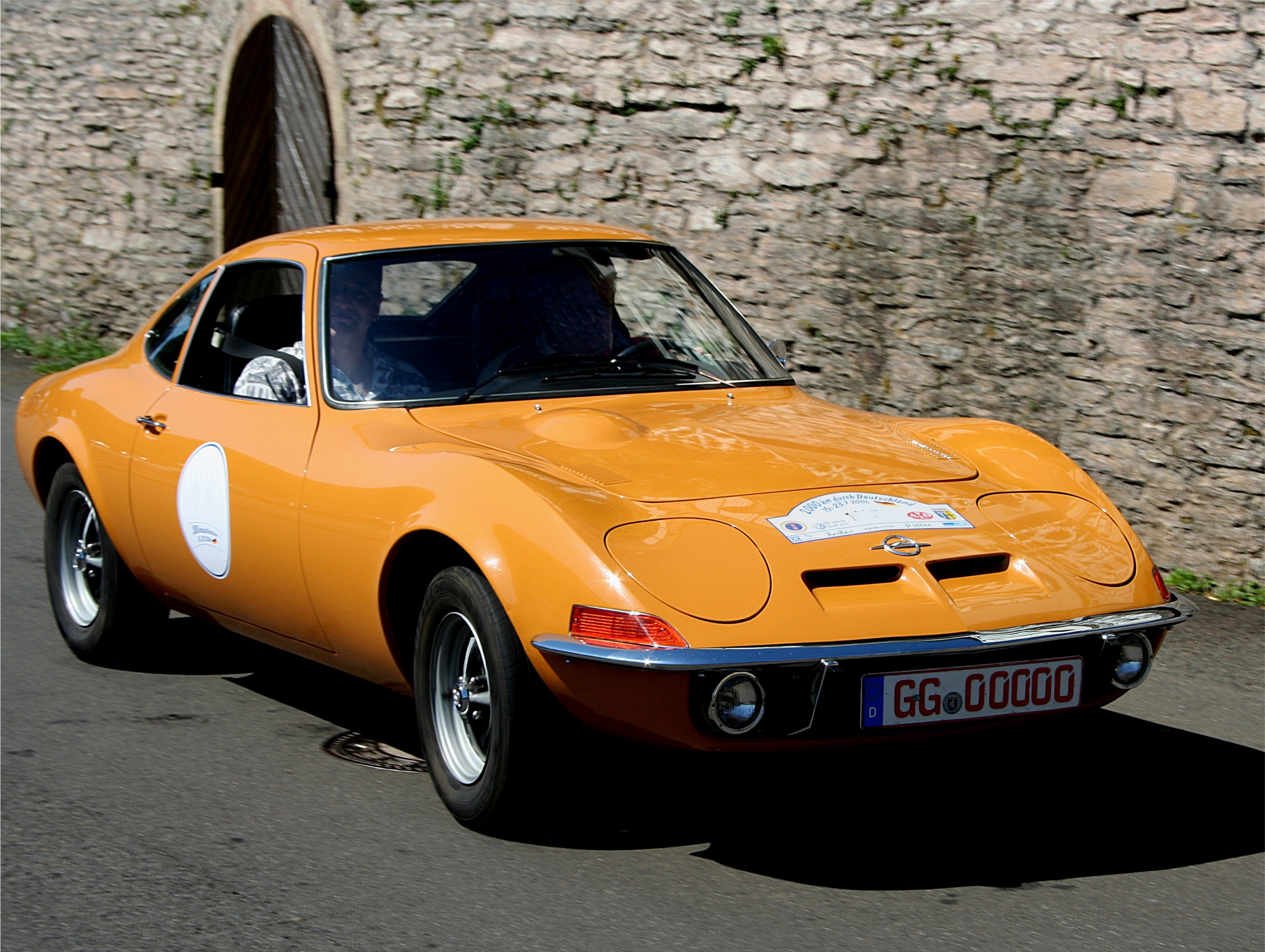

Overview
- Manufacturer: Opel
- Production: 1968–1973; 2007–2009

Body and chassis
- Class: Coupe (1968-1973); Roadster (2007-2009)
- Layout: Front mid-engined, rear-wheel drive

The Opel GT is a front-engine, rear-drive two-seat sports car manufactured and marketed by Opel in two generations separated by a 34-year hiatus.

The first generation Opel GT (1968–1973) debuted as a styling exercise in 1965 at the Paris and Frankfurt motor shows. The production vehicle used mechanical components from the contemporary Opel Kadett B and two-door hard top bodywork by French contractor Brissonneau & Lotz. The styling of the GT was often cited as similar to the 1968 Chevrolet Corvette which went on sale in September 1967.

Opel marketed a second generation GT (2007–2009) as a rebadged variant of the Saturn Sky two-seater convertible (which was based on the Pontiac Solstice), manufactured in Wilmington, Delaware, USA.

In 2016, Opel introduced the GT Concept at the 2016 Geneva Motor Show as a lightweight, turbocharged, rear-wheel drive two-seater.

== GT (1968–1973) ==
GT
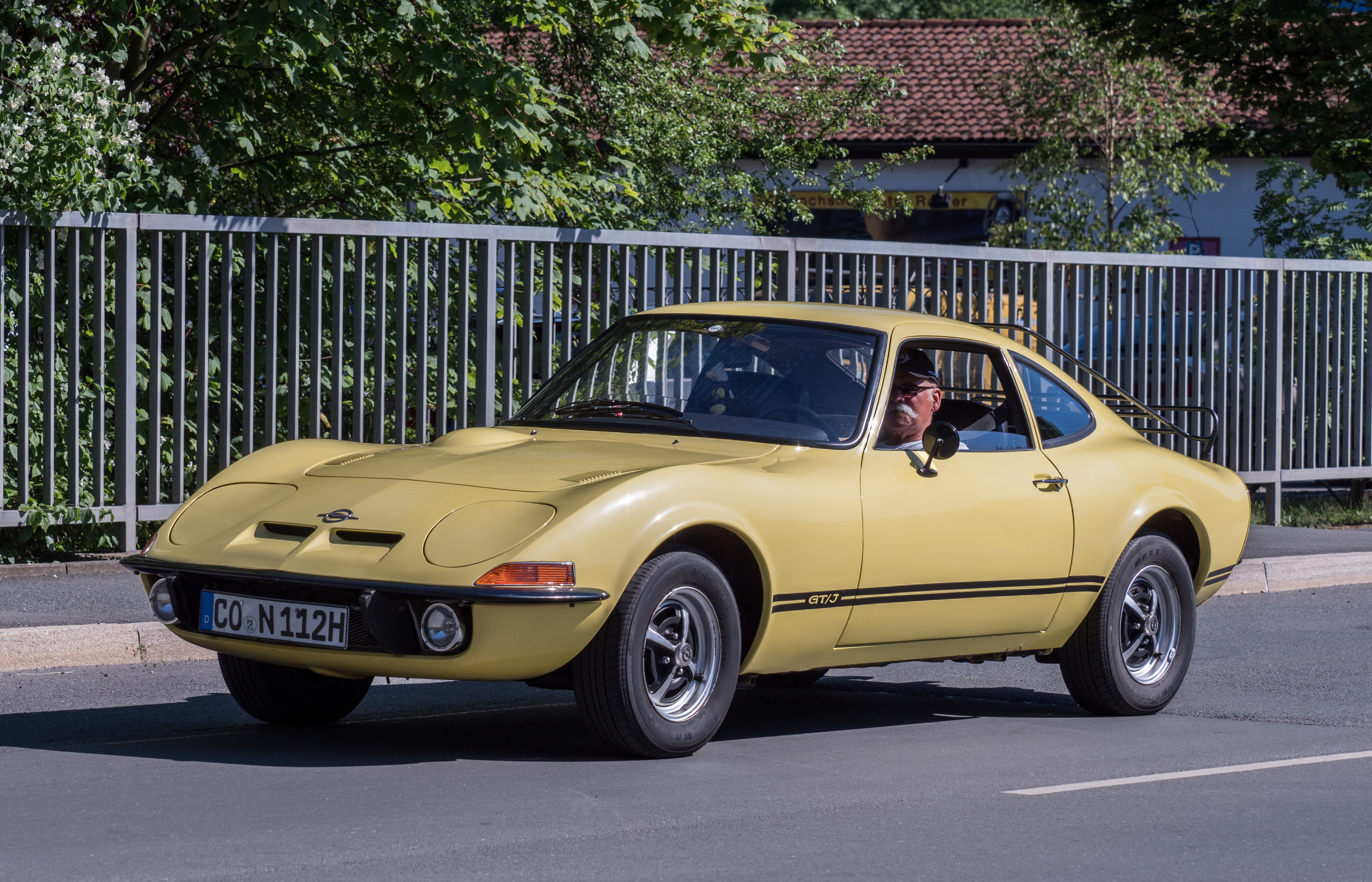

Overview
- Production: 1968–1973
- Assembly: West Germany: Bochum
- Designer: Erhard Schnell, Clare MacKichan

Body and chassis
- Class: Sports car
- Body style: 2-door coupé
- Layout: Front mid-engined, rear-wheel drive

Powertrain
- Engine: 1,078 cc (65.8 cu in) OHV I4; 1,897 cc (115.8 cu in) CIH I4
- Transmission: 4-speed manual 3-speed automatic

Dimensions
- Wheelbase: 2,415 mm (95.1 in)
- Length: 4,113 mm (161.9 in)
- Width: 1,580 mm (62.2 in)
- Height: 1,225 mm (48.2 in)
- Curb weight: 845–940 kg (1,863–2,072 lb)

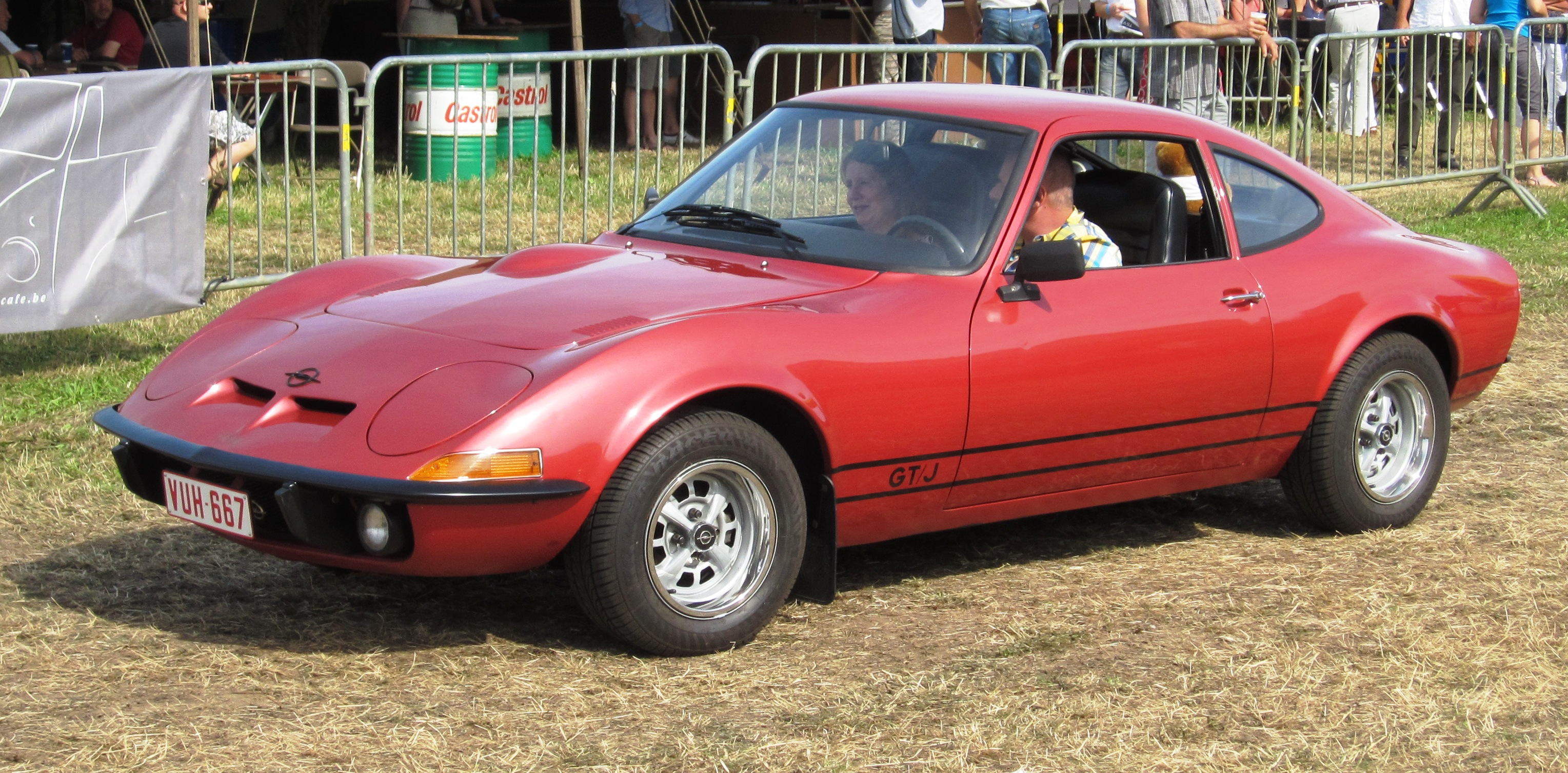
The reduced specification GT/J (for "Junior") introduced in 1971 represented an attempt to broaden the appeal of the Opel GT.

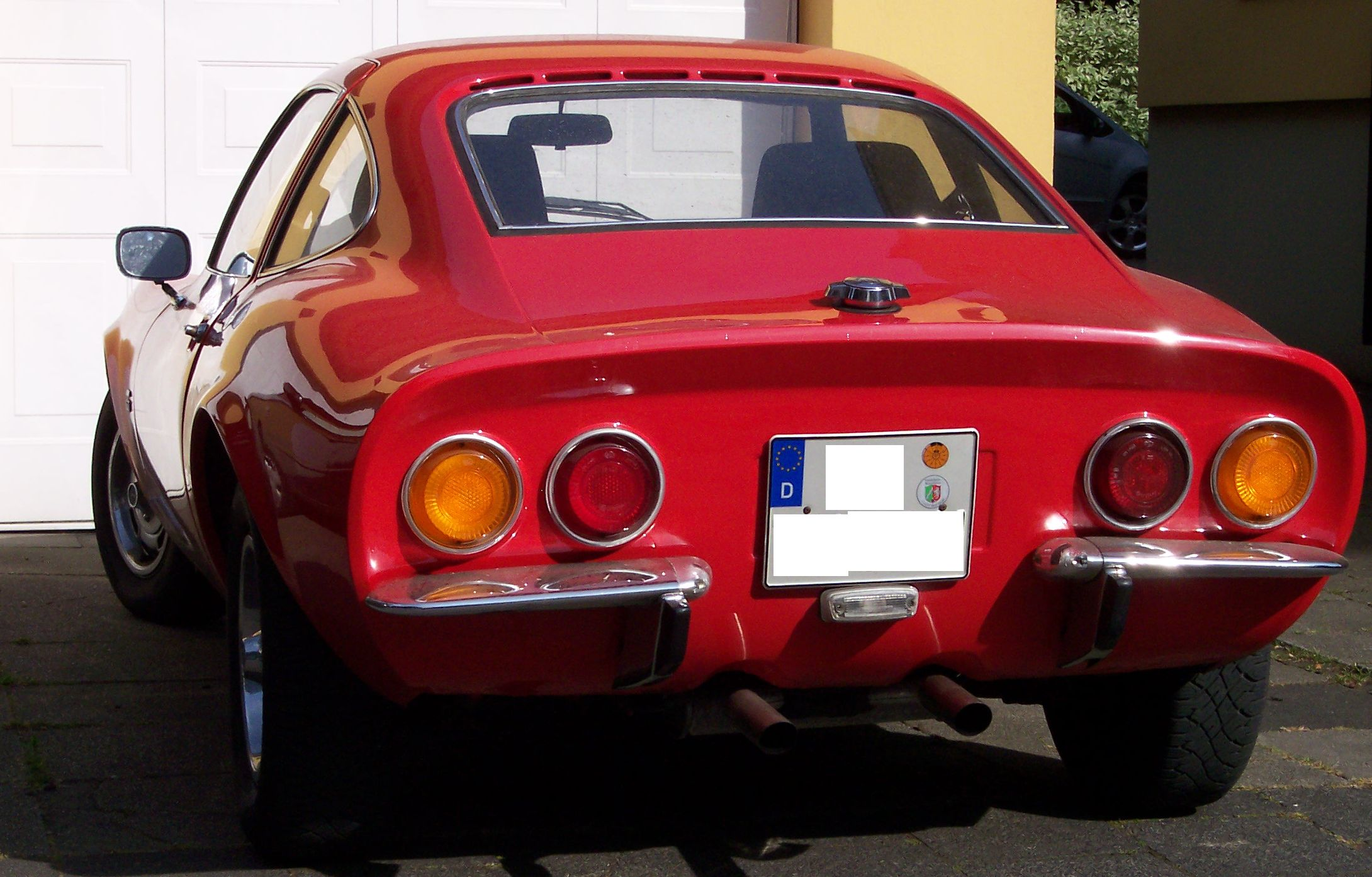
Rear view

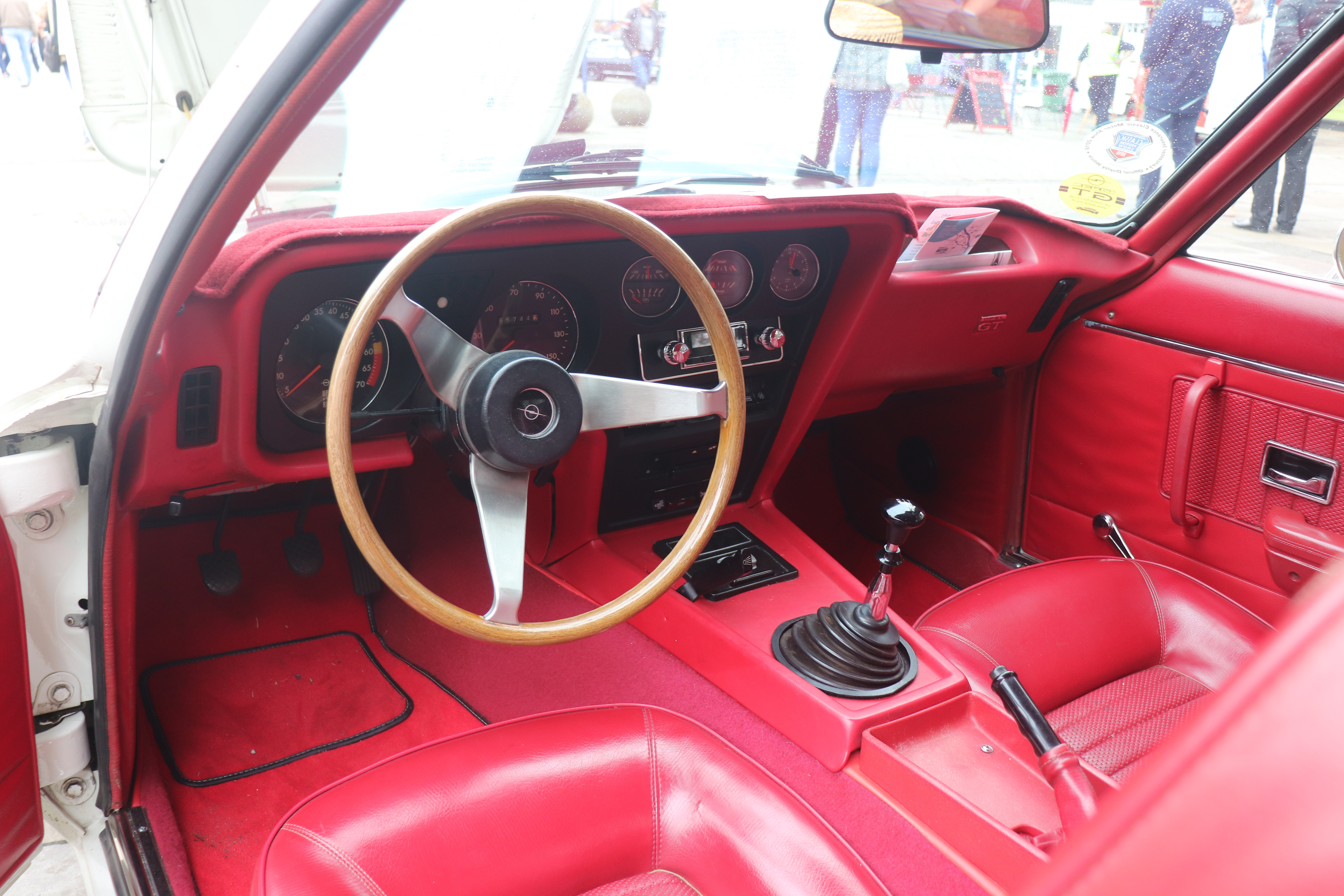
GT interior

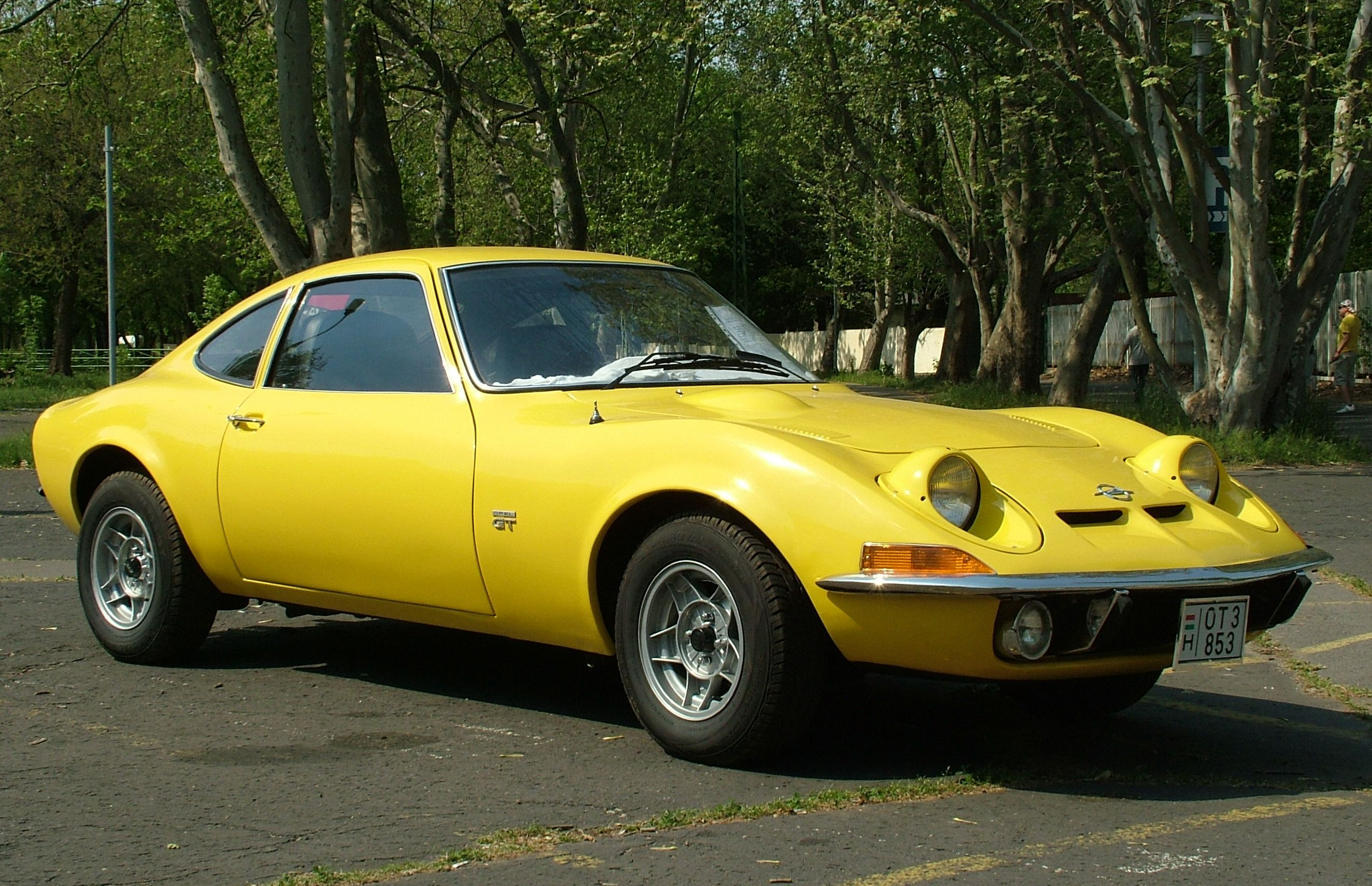
Opel GT with headlights turned up

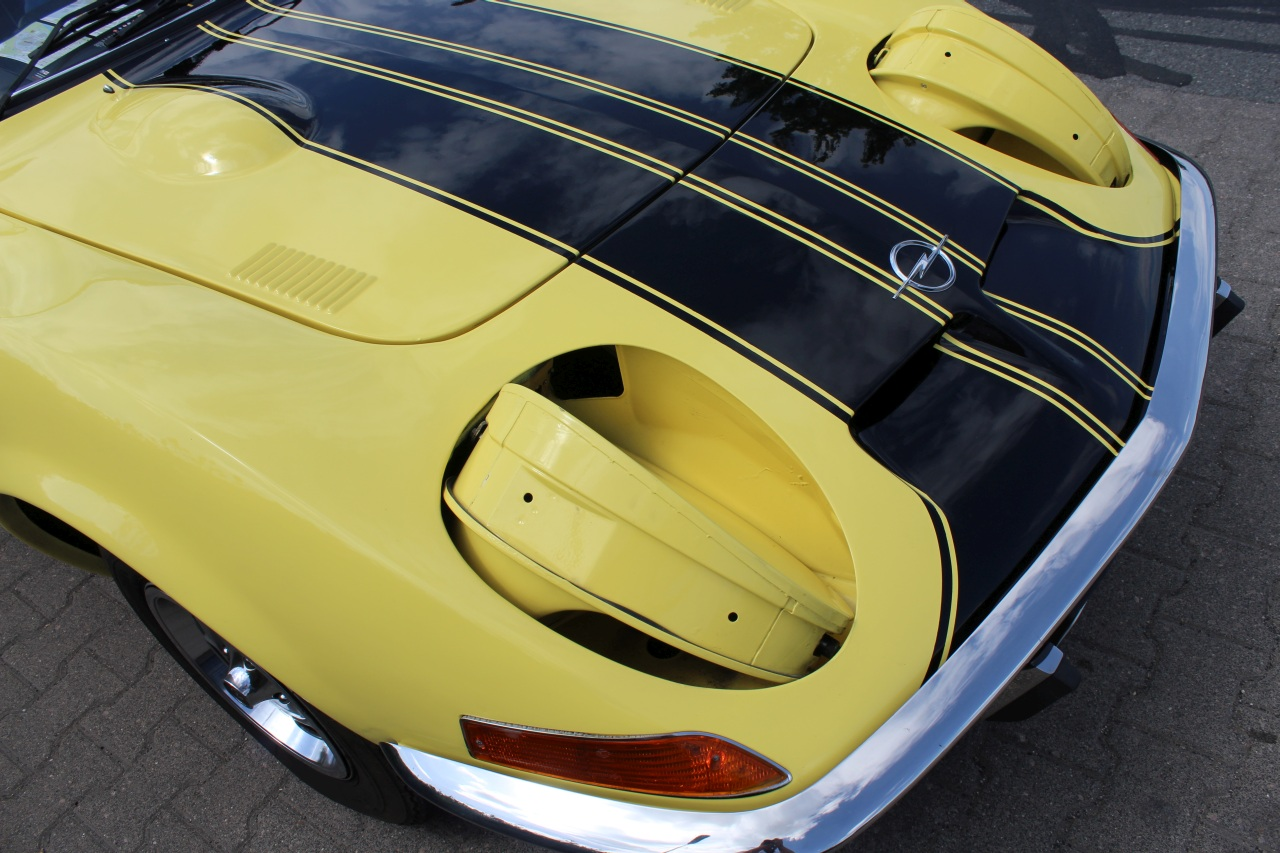
When raising or lowering, both headlights turn in the same direction

The Opel GT was equipped with a base 1.1 L OHV inline-four engine, which produced 67 hp (SAE) at 6,000 rpm. However, most buyers chose an optional 1.9 L camshaft in head engine, which produced 102 hp (SAE) at 5200 to 5400 rpm. Some of the early 1968 models also came with a slightly higher compression "H" code cylinder head. In 1971, due to emissions regulations, Opel reduced the compression ratio of the 1.9 L engine used in the US and output fell to 83 hp (SAE). There was also a GT/J model, which was a less expensive version of the 1.9 L GT that lacked nearly all chrome parts and offered fewer standard features, sold only in Europe. The base transmission was a four-speed manual. A three-speed automatic was available with the 1.9 L engine. The model run of the Opel GT was from 1968 to 1973.

The Opel GT has a steel unibody chassis and a front mid-engined, rear-wheel drive layout. The engine is mounted far back in the chassis to improve weight distribution. Front suspension consists of upper A-arms and a lower transverse leaf spring. A live axle and coil springs are used in the rear. The power-assisted braking system uses discs in the front, drums in the rear. Steering is unassisted.

One unusual feature of the Opel GT is the operation of the hidden headlamps. They are manually operated, by way of a large lever along the center console next to the shifter. Unlike pop-up headlights, they both rotate in the same direction (counterclockwise from inside the car) about a longitudinal axis.

Designed by Opel stylist Erhard Schnell, the GT is a fastback, that has neither an externally accessible trunk nor a conventional hatchback. There is a parcel shelf behind the seats that can only be accessed through the main doors. Behind the parcel shelf is a fold-up panel that conceals a spare tire and jack.

During 1968 to 1973, a total of 103,463 were sold — including the first few hundred cars hand-assembled in 1968 and the 1968–1970 models with the 1.1 L engine, which totaled 3,573 cars. Of the later GTs, 10,760 were the cheaper model GT/J model. In some markets, items like a limited-slip differential, front and rear anti-sway bars, heated rear window, and engine bay light were standard, although most cars were shipped without them.

In North America, the GT was marketed at Buick dealerships. There was, unusually, no Vauxhall counterpart to the GT for the United Kingdom.

Reasons for ending production were the need to redesign the car to remain competitive with up-and-coming sports models, such as the Datsun 240Z, as well as the termination of Brissonneau and Lotz's bodybuilding contract.

The Opel GT was also used by Italian coachbuilder Sergio Coggiola to create the Opel Sylvia GT, an angular design of the folded-paper school. The 1973 Sylvia was also designed with an eye to safety.

Automotive magazine Road & Track reviewed the GT in their June 1969 issue, recording 0–96 km/h in 10.8 seconds and a top speed of 182 km/h. Road & Track also found the car to have strong understeer, suggesting the 165x13 tires to be too small, although the ride was comfortable.

== GT (roadster) (2007–2010) ==
GT (roadster)
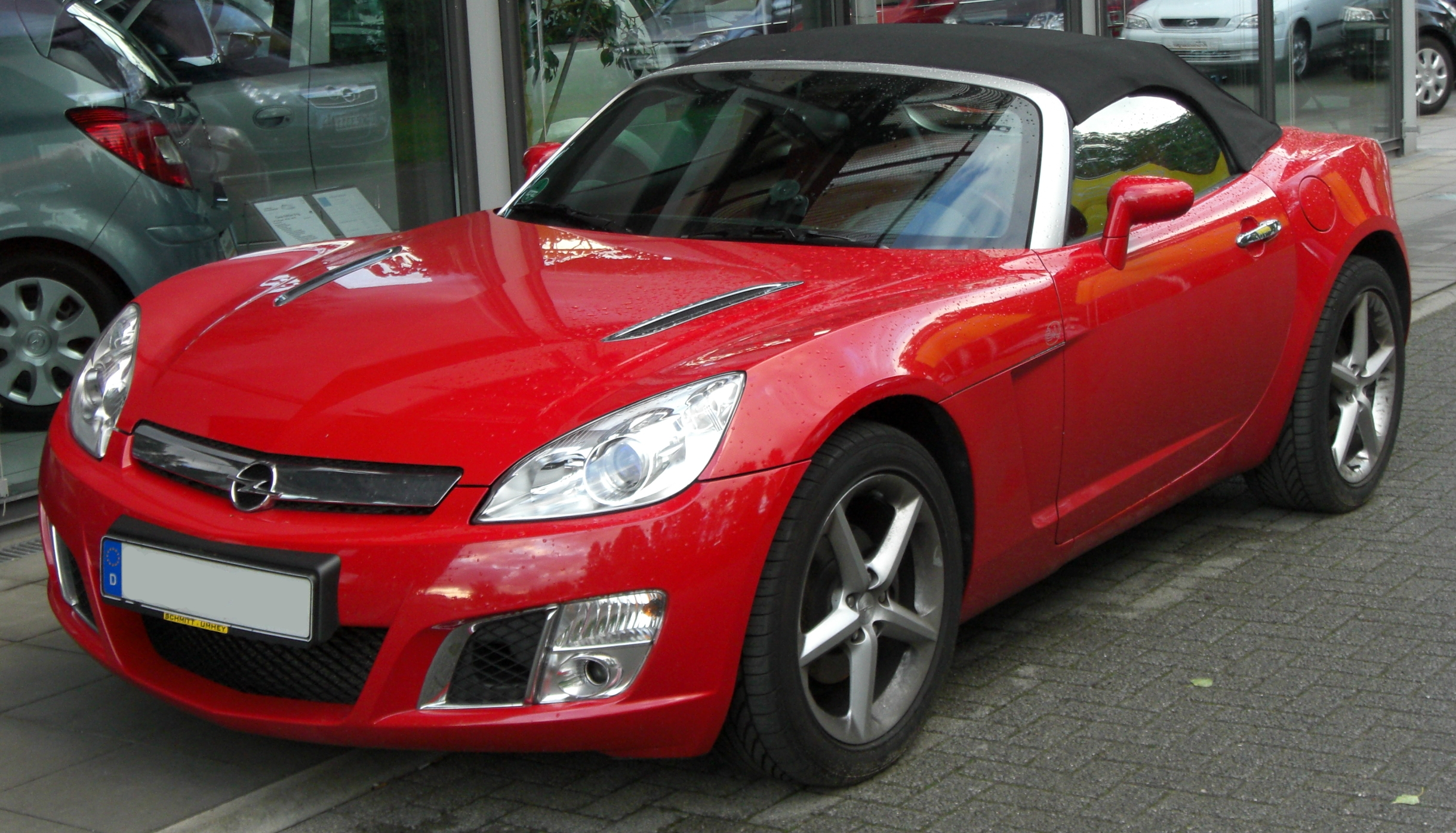

Overview
- Also called: Saturn Sky, Pontiac Solstice (USA & Canada); GM Daewoo G2X (South Korea)
- Production: 2007–2009
- Assembly: United States: Wilmington, Delaware (Wilmington Assembly)
- Designer: Franz von Holzhausen

Body and chassis
- Class: Sports car (S)
- Body style: 2-door roadster
- Layout: Front mid-engined, rear-wheel drive
- Platform: Kappa platform/GMX024
- Related: Pontiac Solstice, Saturn Sky

Powertrain
- Engine: 1,998 cc (121.9 cu in) LNF I4 (turbo gasoline)

Dimensions
- Wheelbase: 2,415 mm (95.1 in)
- Length: 4,091 mm (161.1 in)
- Width: 1,813 mm (71.4 in)
- Height: 1,276 mm (50.2 in)
- Curb weight: 1,325–1,406 kg (2,921–3,100 lb)

Chronology
- Predecessor: Opel Speedster

The new Opel GT was produced from 2007 to 2009. It was a badge engineered variant of the Pontiac Solstice and the Saturn Sky and was available solely with the 2.0 L, 260 hp (194 kW; 264 PS) direct injection turbocharged Ecotec four-cylinder engine. It has 18-inch alloy wheels. The car replaced the Opel Speedster in the European lineup, but was not sold in the UK under the Vauxhall name, as the Wilmington Assembly Plant where it was produced did not have the necessary tooling for producing right-hand drive vehicles.

The Opel GT was available with meaningful, albeit only slight, variations to the Saturn Sky from which it was derived, those being a cigarette lighting implement, door card ashtrays, and differing tail lights and mirrors (for the updated 2009 EU regulations.)

Following the General Motors bailout of 2008 and subsequent restructuring of the company, both Saturn and Pontiac were done away with, resulting in the ceasing of all Opel GT production from 2009 onward. Two 2010 model year Opel GTs were produced, albeit in 2009. Following the entry into the 2010s, there would be no production vehicle to bear the Opel GT name.

=== Production by model year ===
Model Year	Total Opel GT (Roadster) Production
2007	2,365
2008	4,851
2009	301
2010	2
Total	7,519

== GT Concept (2016) ==
2016 concept
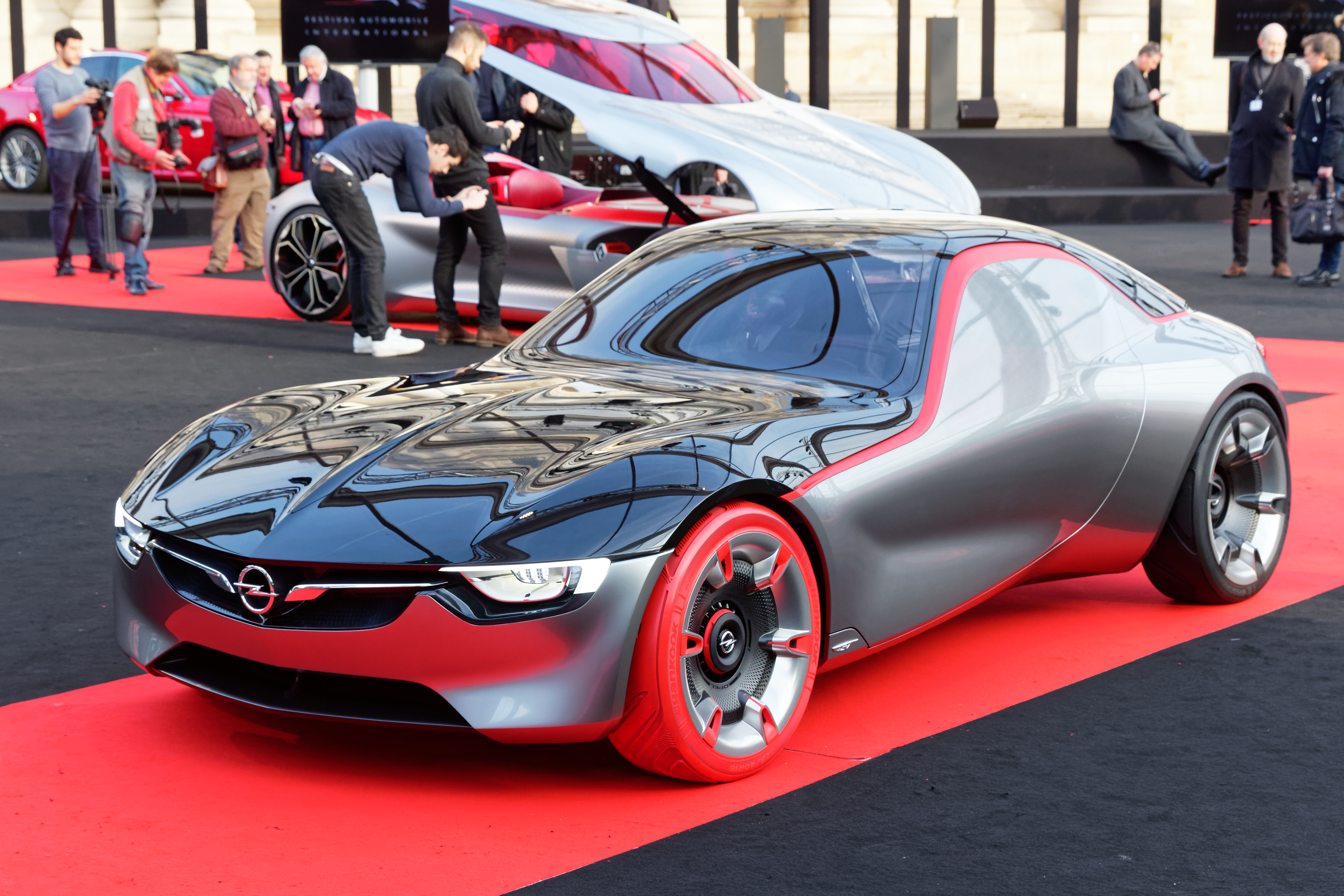

Overview
- Production: 2016
- Designer: Mark Adams

Body and chassis
- Class: Concept car
- Body style: 2-door coupé
- Layout: Front mid-engined, rear-wheel drive

Powertrain
- Engine: 998 cc (60.9 cu in) LDB I3 (turbo gasoline)
- Transmission: 6-speed semi-automatic

Dimensions
- Curb weight: 2,200 lb (998 kg)

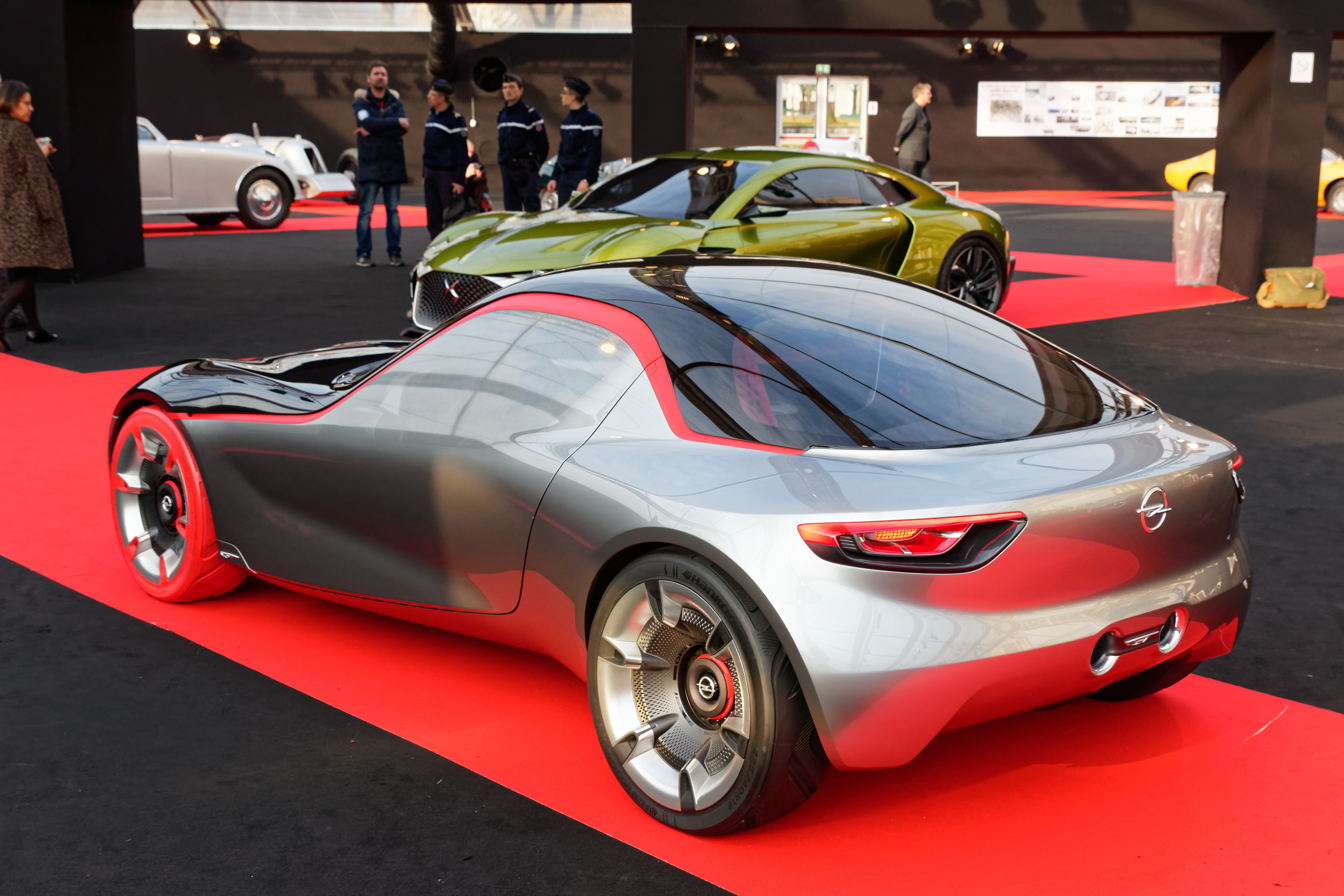
Opel GT Concept rear view

The 2016 Opel GT concept debuted on 27 January 2016. Built on an all-new compact rear-wheel-drive platform, the GT has a lightweight construction and stripped down interior. Power comes from a turbocharged 1.0-liter three-cylinder engine producing 145 hp with a 6-speed semi-automatic gearbox.

The concept features historic design cues associated with Opel's past products; the twin tailpipes with the GT wordmark in the middle are reminiscent of those on the original 1965 GT prototype.

The car made its first public debut on March 1 at the 2016 Geneva Motor Show. A production version was being conjectured to follow in 2018, commemorating the 50th anniversary of the original Opel GT's unveiling in 1968, and Opel didn't rule out the possibility.

However, the production Opel GT concept was cancelled not only due to a shrinking market for sports cars, but also the brand's acquisition by Groupe PSA.
