= Opel OHV engine =

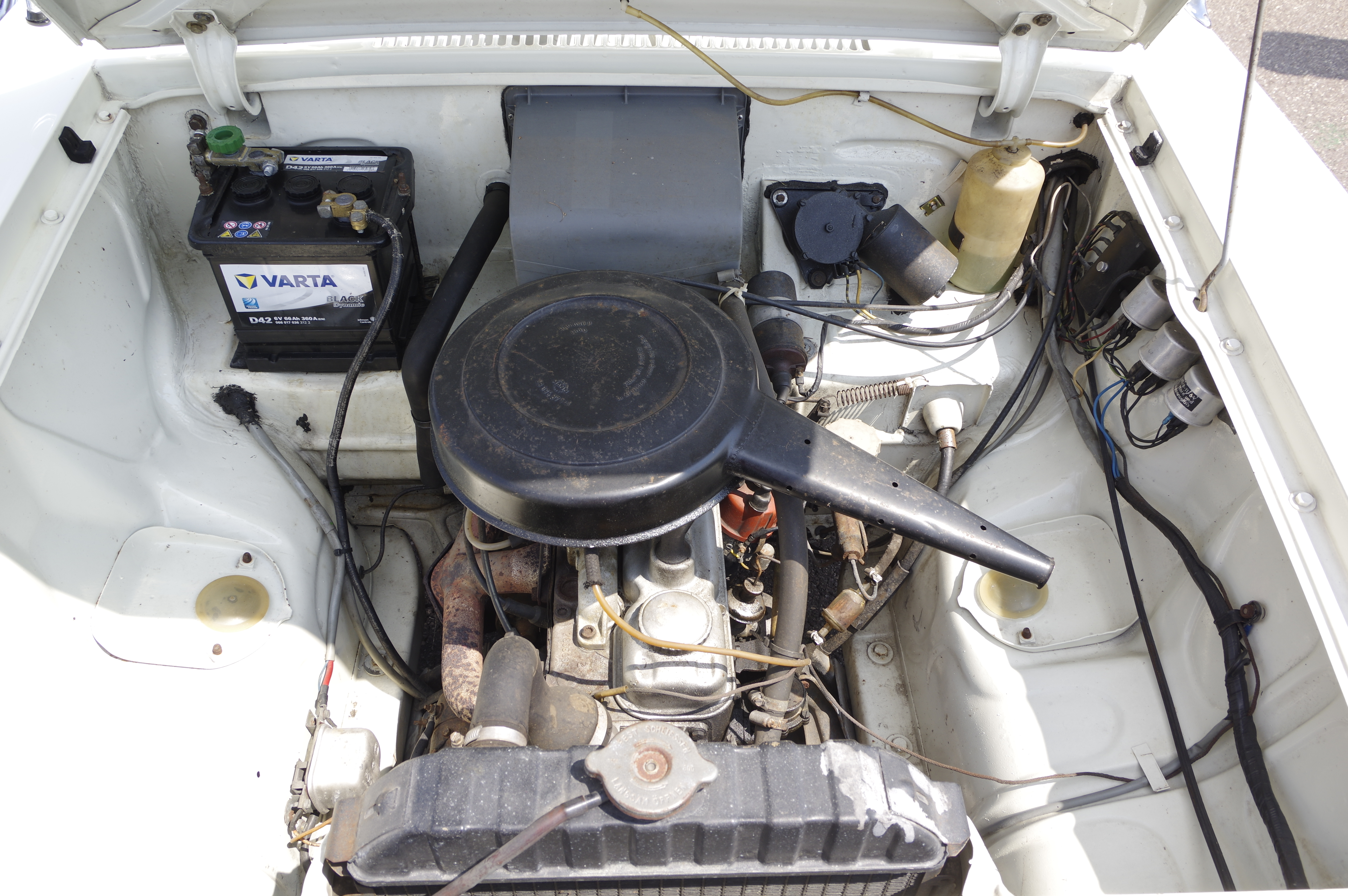
- 1963 10N engine

Overview
- Manufacturer: General Motors
- Also called: Kadett engine, Viva engine
- Production: 1962-1993

Layout
- Configuration: Naturally aspirated Inline-four engine
- Displacement: 993 cc (60.6 cu in); 1,078 cc (65.8 cu in); 1,196 cc (73.0 cu in)
- Cylinder bore: 72 mm (2.8 in); 75 mm (3.0 in); 79 mm (3.1 in)
- Piston stroke: 61 mm (2.4 in)
- Valvetrain: OHV

Combustion
- Fuel type: Gasoline
- Oil system: Wet sump
- Cooling system: Water-cooled

Output
- Power output: 29–44 kW (40–60 PS)

Chronology
- Successor: Family 1

The Opel OHV family (also known as the Kadett engine and Viva engine after its most famous applications) is a pushrod inline-four engine. It was the first all-new engine developed by Opel of Germany after World War II and was released in 1962. Versions were in use through 1993.

Vauxhall would also make use of a locally built version of the OHV engine for the Vauxhall Viva, the original intention being to simply convert every component from metric dimensions to imperial measurements. However development of the OHV would soon be separate from to that of Opel, one of the first changes being to increase the size from 993cc to 1057cc via a slightly bigger 74mm bore yet built with the same stroke as the Opel OHV with later bore increases to 78mm and 81mm producing the 1159cc and 1256cc engines that would also power the Bedford HA, Vauxhall Firenza, Vauxhall Chevette and Vauxhall Cavalier as well as the Holden Torana.

The engine was gradually replaced from 1979 onwards by the GM Family I, but continued to be used on base specification versions of the Kadett/Astra and Corsa/Nova for much of the 1980s.

== 1.0 ==
The first version of the engine was the 1.0 and placed in the Kadett A which was produced from 1962 to 1965. Displacement was 993 cc (61 cu in) with a 72 mm × 61 mm (2.83 in × 2.40 in) bore and stroke. The Kadett A had two different versions of the engine, namely 10N (normal compression) with 29 kW (40 PS) and 10S (super compression) with 35 kW (48 PS).

This engine was retired in 1965 in favor of the 1.1 but was revived in 1973 as an economy option for the Kadett C. It was briefly discontinued in 1981 but revived a second time a year later for the entry-level models of the Opel Corsa A/Vauxhall Nova where it produced 33 kW (45 PS). It was also used in export market models of the Opel Kadett D.

The engine was finally retired in the European market for the 1992 model year in the Corsa A/Nova owing to its inability to satisfy the upcoming Euro 1 emission standard which required the fitment of catalytic converters - the engine was one of very few still employing mechanical contact breaker ignition at the time of its discontinuation.

Applications:

- 1962-1965 Opel Kadett A
- 1973-1979 Opel Kadett C
- 1979-August 1981 Opel Kadett D
- September 1982 – 1992 Opel Corsa A / Vauxhall Nova

== 1.1 ==
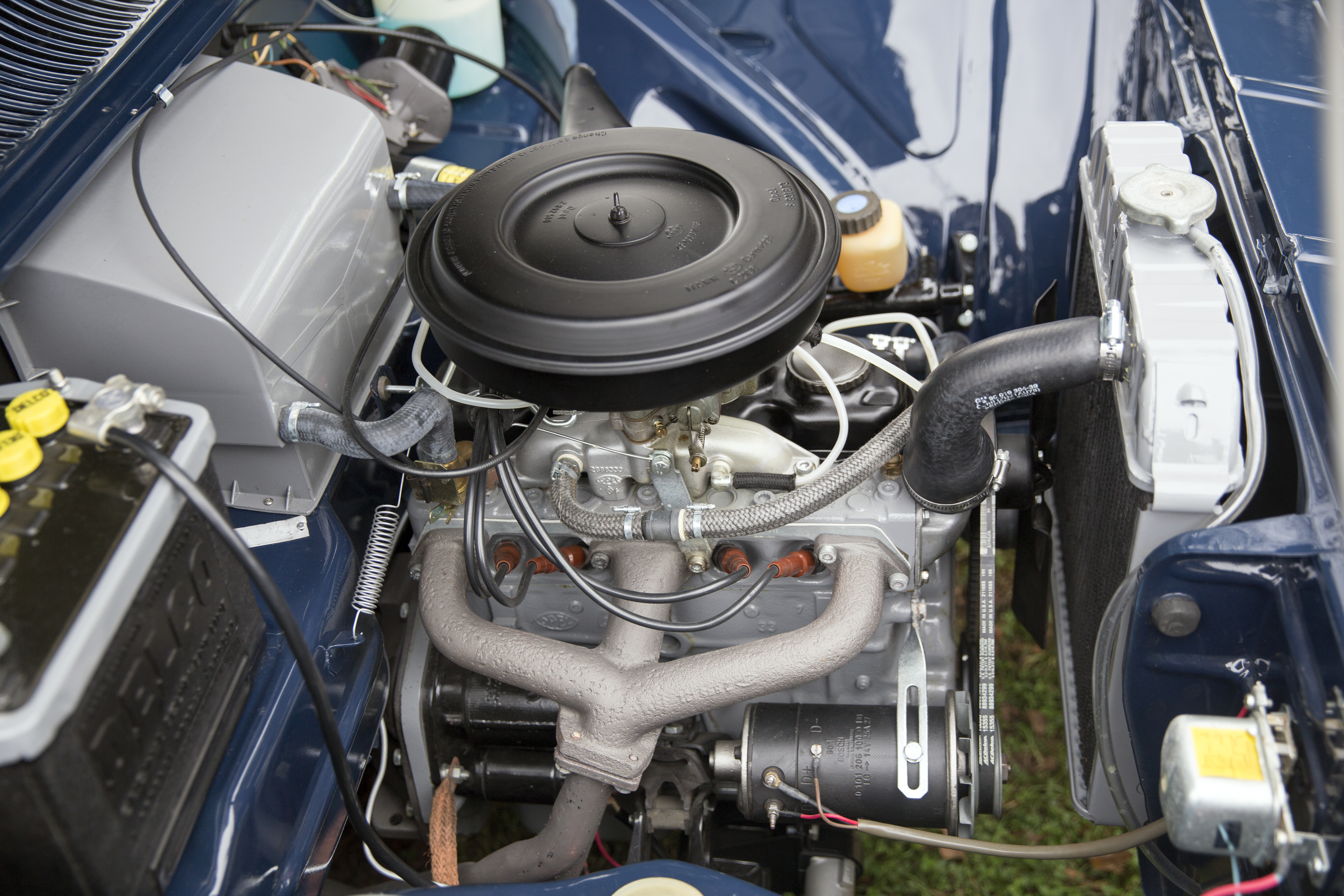
Right-hand side view of a 1967 11S engine (US-spec)

In 1965, the engine was enlarged for use in the all new Kadett B. Displacement was 1,078 cc (66 cu in) with a bore enlarged to 75 mm (3.0 in) stroke remained at 61 mm (2.4 in). The 11N (normal compression) produced 33 kW (45 PS) and 37 kW (50 PS) after 1971. The 11S produced 40 kW (55 PS); in 1966 a special power version was introduced, the 11SR with 44 kW (60 PS).

Applications:

- 1965-1973 Opel Kadett B
- 1967-1970 Opel Olympia A
- 1968-1970 Opel GT 1100

== 1.2 ==
In 1971, a second enlargement made the 1.2 with a displacement of 1,196 cc (73.0 cu in). Bore was enlarged to 79 mm (3.1 in) and stroke was still at 61 mm (2.4 in). Performance of the 12N varied from 37–40 kW (50–55 PS); the 12S consistently had 44 kW (60 PS).

Applications:

- 1971-1973 Opel Kadett B
- 1973-1979 Opel Kadett C
- 1979-1984 Opel Kadett D / Chevrolet Kadett (ZA) / Vauxhall Astra Mk 1
- 1984-1988 Opel Kadett E / Vauxhall Astra Mk 2
- March 1972 – 1975 Opel Ascona A
- 1975-1980 Opel Ascona B / Vauxhall Cavalier Mk 1
- 1972-1975 Opel Manta A
- 1975-1979 Opel Manta B
- 1982-1993 Opel Corsa A / Vauxhall Nova (also with catalyst and 33 kW (45 PS))

Opel engine codes explained
1. = Emissions controls	2./3. = Displacement (in tenths of liters)	4. = Compression ratio	5. = Fuel feed (only on gasoline engines)	5./6. = Special conditions	
empty = no emissions controls/ECE R83A	12 = 1.2 Liter	G = < 8.5:1	V = Carburetor	A = Egyptian market/revised version	P = High Output (until 2000)
E = Euronorm catalytic converter	14 = 1.4 Liter	L = > 8.5–9.0:1	Z = Single-point injection	B = Bedford/IBC	P = TwinPort (since 2000)
C = Euro 1, Three-way catalytic converter	16 = 1.6 liter	N = > 9.0–9.5:1	E = Multi-point injection	D = Daewoo (D-TEC)	Q = Colombia
X = Euro 2	17 = 1.7 liter	S = > 9.5–10.5:1	H = Direct injection	E = Ecoflex?	R = enhanced power
Y = Euro 3	18 = 1.8 liter	X = > 10.5–11.5:1	F = FlexFuel (E85)	F = government fleet (de-tuned)	S = Increased power/turbocharging
Z = Euro 4	20 = 2.0 liter	Y = > 11,5:1	L = LPG	G = Natural gas	T = Turbocharger/special version
A = Euro 5 (since 2007), Austria	25 = 2.5 liter	D = Diesel	N = Natural gas (often used with 6th character G)	H = high output/forced induction	U = Uruguay
B = Euro 6	28 = 2.8 liter			I = Irmscher	V = Volume model
D = Euro 6c	30 = 3.0 liter			J = adjusted output	W = Venezuela
F = Euro 6d	32 = 3.2 liter			K = Comprex	1 = Family 1 engine
H = Australian ADR 37 ("Holden")				L = reduced power/low pressure turbo	2 = Family II engine
S = Swedish/Swiss A 10/11 emissions				M = Middle East/Common Rail Diesel	empty = no special condition
