= Chevrolet 3800 =

Chevrolet 3800 may refer to:

- Chevrolet 3800, a version of the Chevrolet Advance Design
- Chevrolet 3800, a version of the Opel Rekord D
- The 3.8 L (229 cu in) version of the Chevrolet 90° V6 engine
