= Opel Rekord Series C =

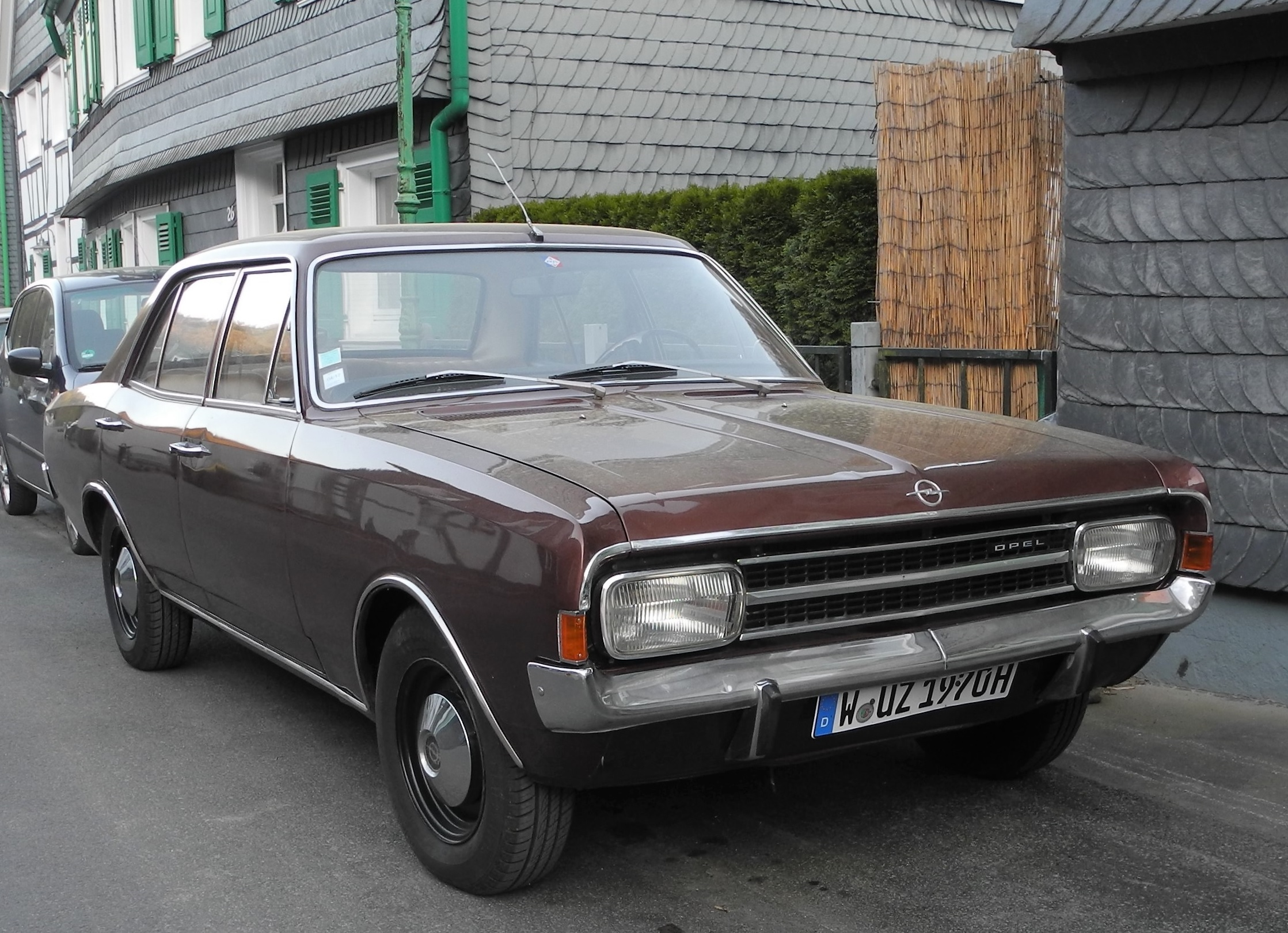

Overview
- Manufacturer: Opel (General Motors)
- Production: August 1966 – December 1971
- Assembly: Germany: Rüsselsheim; Switzerland: Biel; Malaysia: Johor Bahru

Body and chassis
- Class: Large family car (D)
- Body style: 2/4-door saloon 3/5-door estate 3-door van 2-door coupé (from 1967)
- Platform: V body
- Related: Opel Commodore; Chevrolet Opala

Powertrain
- Engine: 1,492 cc I4; 1,698 cc I4; 1,897 cc I4; 2,239 cc I6
- Transmission: 3-speed manual (till 1970); 4-speed manual (included or optional according to model); Automatic optional with 6-cylinder and high compression 4-cylinder engines (from 1968)

Chronology
- Predecessor: Opel Rekord Series B
- Successor: Opel Rekord Series D

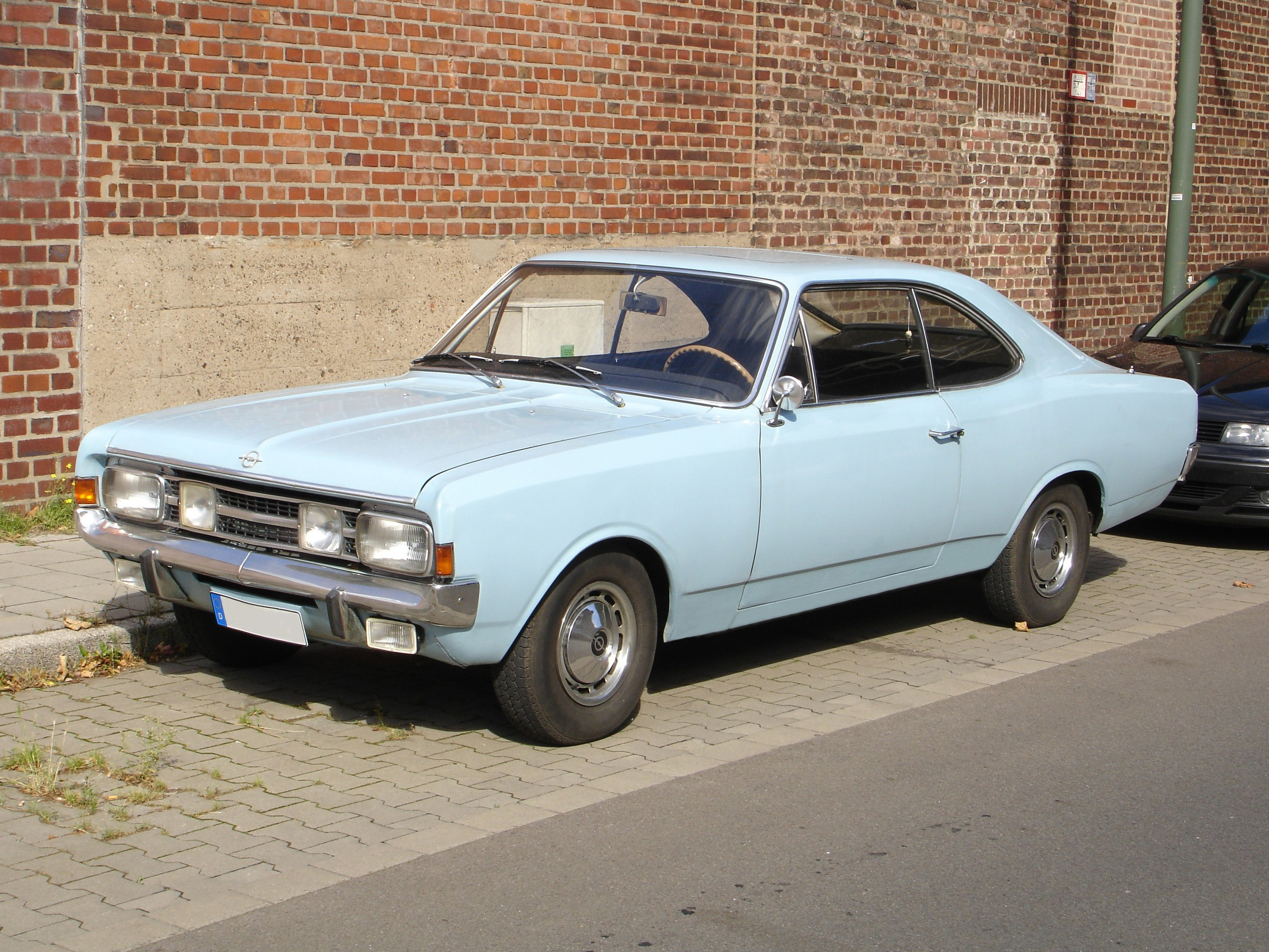
Opel Rekord C (factory built) coupé

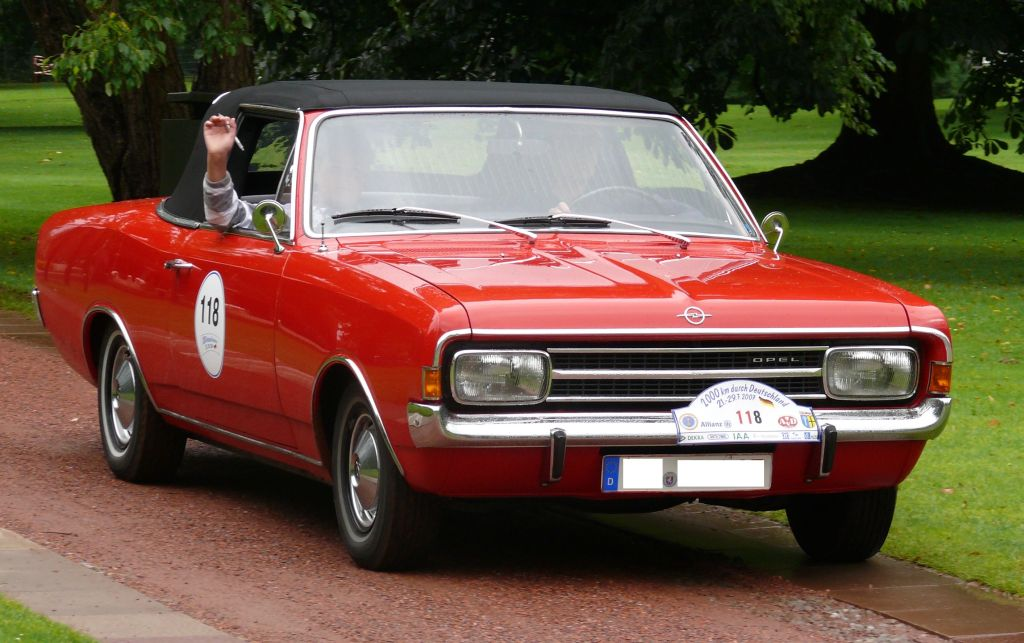
Opel Rekord C convertible: Karl Deutsch conversion based on the factory built 2-door sedan

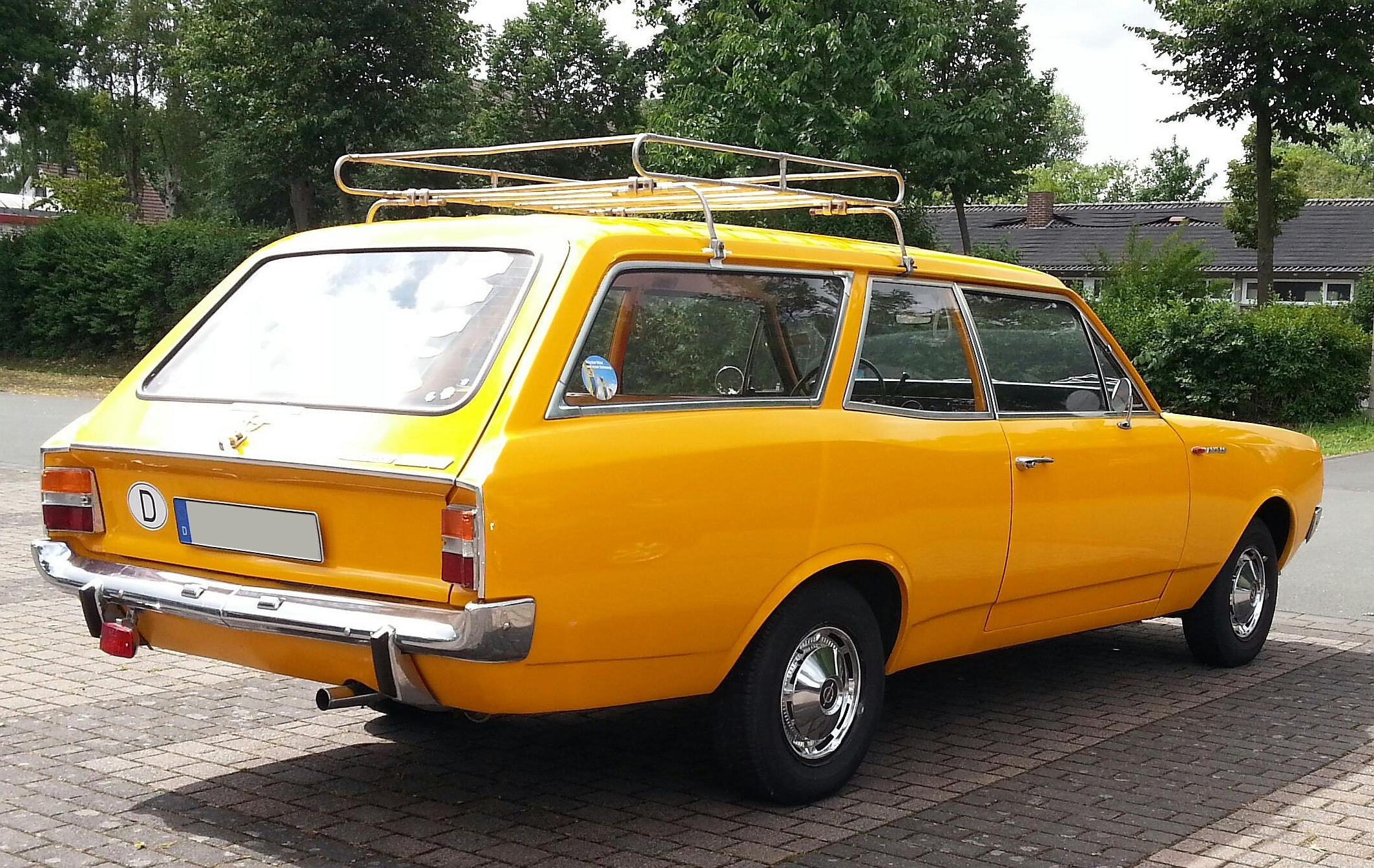
Opel Rekord C 3-door Kombi (estate). The Rekord C was the first Rekord offered with a five-door estate included in the range, but many customers continued to specify the three-door version.

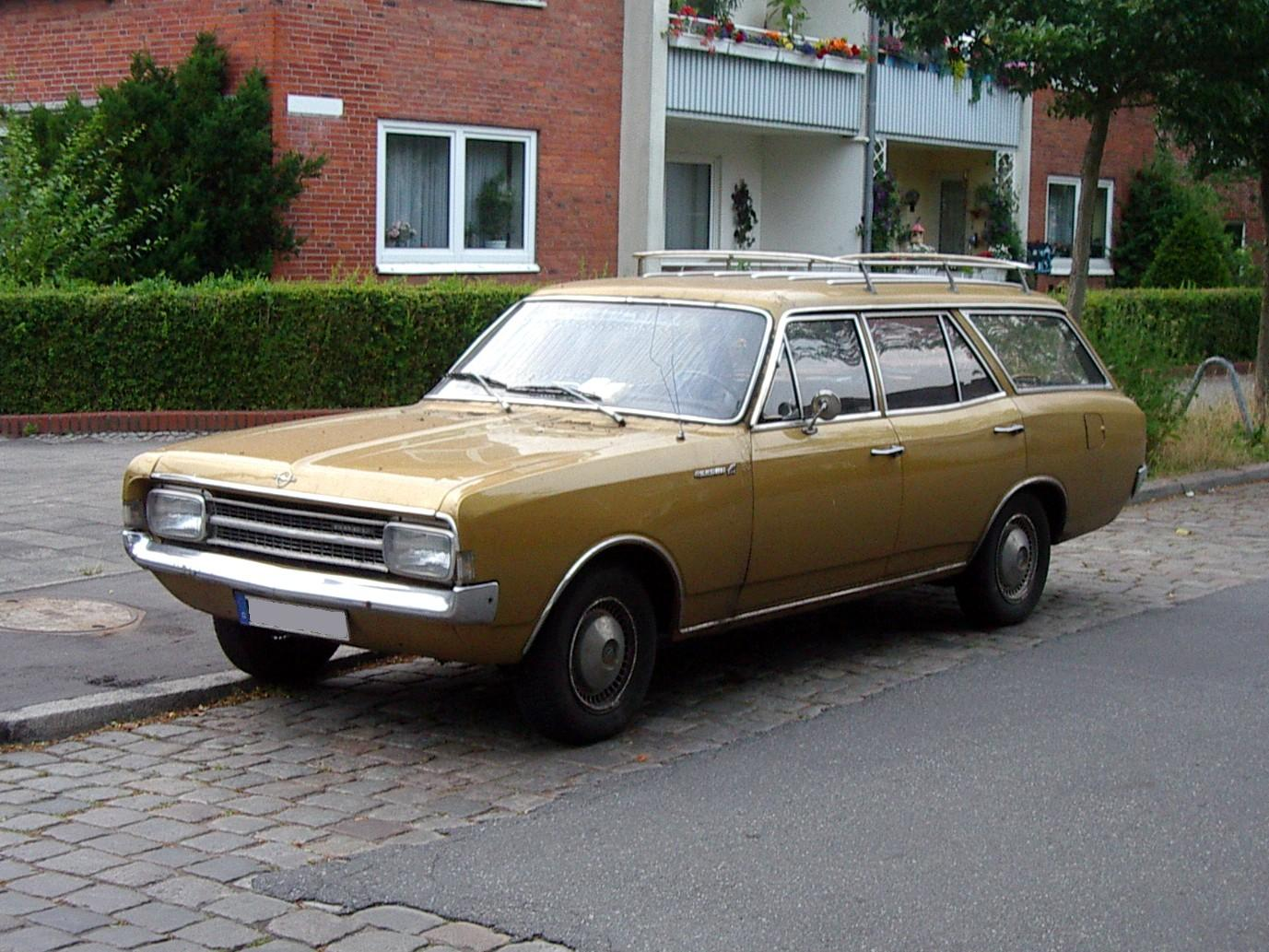
Opel Rekord C 5-door Kombi (estate).

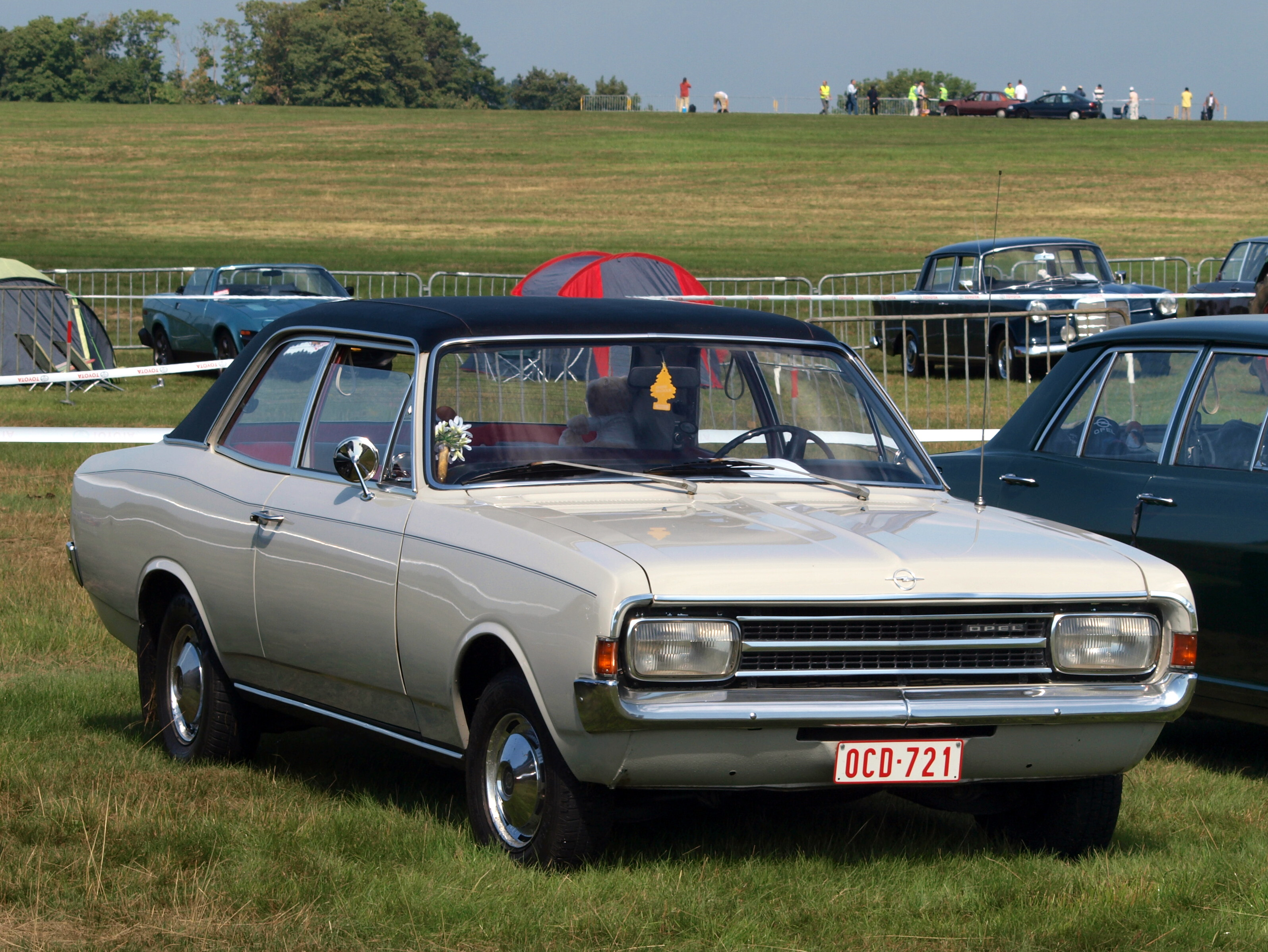
Opel Rekord C 2-door Saloon/Berline. Vinyl roof coverings were fashionable at this time, and with the Rekord C they had the added advantage that they made the car resemble, for a careless observer, an Opel Commodore

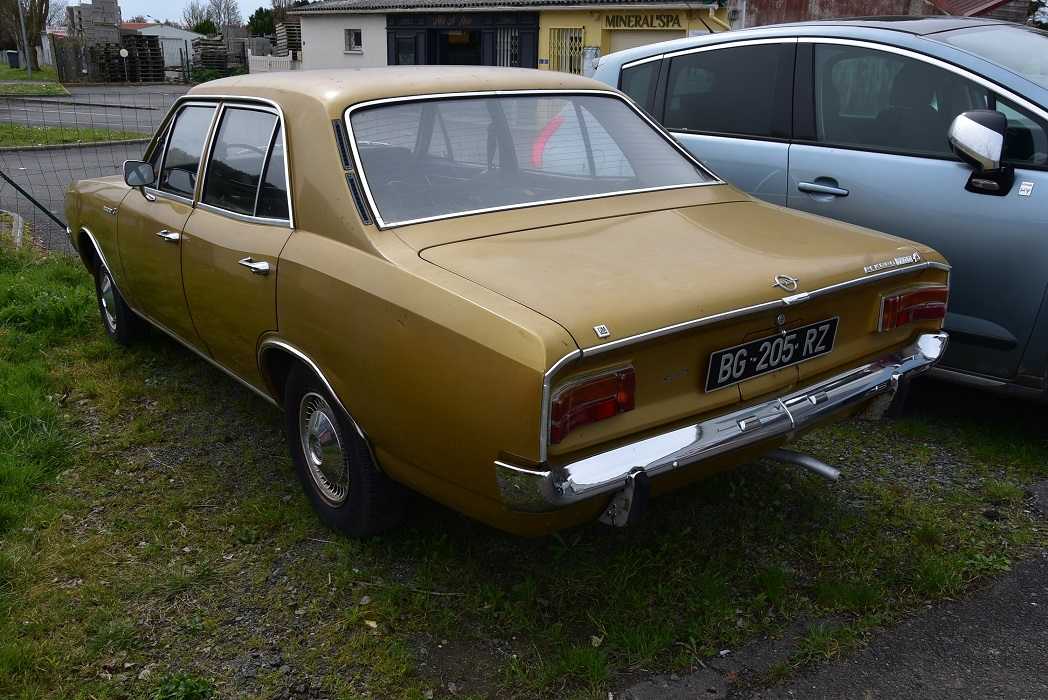
Opel Rekord C 1700 LS - rear

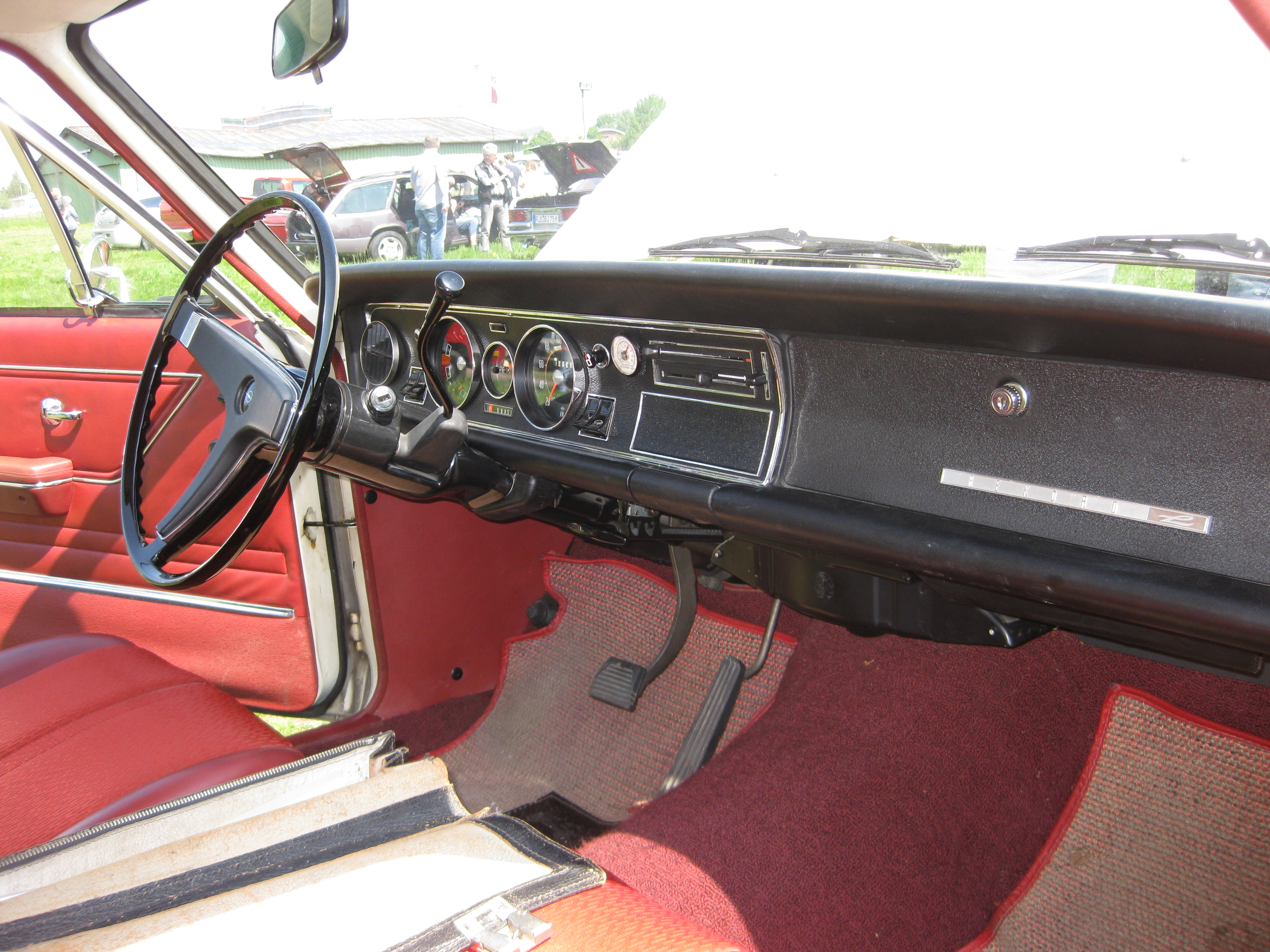
Opel Rekord C interior

The Opel Rekord Series C is a large family car that was introduced in August 1966, by Opel as a replacement for the short-lived Opel Rekord Series B. It was slightly larger all round than its predecessor, from which it inherited most of its engines. It continued in production until replaced by the Opel Rekord Series D at the end of 1971.

The Rekord C's 5 1/3-year production run was longer than that of any previous generation of Opel Rekord, and during that period 1,276,681 were produced. This made it the first "middle-class" Opel to exceed the one million mark. Cars based on the Rekord C were also built at other General Motors plants both inside and beyond Europe, notably in South Africa and (with Chevrolet engines) Brazil.

== Origins ==
After less than a year of production, in August 1966, the "stopgap" Opel Rekord B was replaced with the Opel Rekord C, featuring completely new bodywork. Hans Mersheimer, Opel's Technical Director and Chief Engineer, until his retirement in 1967, had set down the parameters for the new Rekord back in 1963.

The design of the Rekord C has been characterised by some enthusiasts as "erotic" on account of the "hip-curve" (Hüftschwung) on the lower window-line ahead of the C-pillar, which reminded some observers of a Coca-Cola bottle and so gave rise to this becoming known as "Coke-Bottle line" Rekord "(Cola-Flaschen-Rekord)". The "Coke-Bottle line", which was also picked up by GM's English, subsidiary, with the Viva HB and seems to have originated in the United States with one or two mid-1960s "muscle-car" designs: it was also picked up for a sedan design by the 1968 Chevrolet Chevy II. There was a concern at Opel throughout this period that their designs might be rejected by European buyers as being simply "too American", and it was presumably a reflection of this that an alternative design without the "hip-curve" line on the back doors was also prepared by Opel designer Herbert Killmer. There was certainly a perception that Opel's great rival fell foul of the "too American" complaint with their Ford 17M launched in 1967 featuring a variation on the "hip-curve" which then had to be relaunched with a simplified form less than a year later because of poor sales which, rightly or wrongly, were attributed to an excessively American design. Ford's stumble with their 1967 17M model was Opel's gain in the market place, however, and there was no sign of market resistance the exceptionally well balanced overall design of the Opel Rekord C, hip-curve and all.

== The bodies ==
The new Rekord again offered a relatively extensive range of body types. Top seller was the saloon, available with either 2 or 4 doors. There was a 3-door "Kombi" estate, and now, for the first time, a Rekord estate with five doors. Opel also offered a three-door delivery van which was essentially identical to the estate except that the rear side windows were replaced with metal panels. In addition, from 1967 a factory built coupé was provided. This version had no fixed B pillar and excited positive reactions to the stylish "pillarless" profile on show when both side windows were fully opened.

A cabriolet version was also available. Based on the Rekord C coupé, this was a coach-built conversion produced by the body builders Karl Deutsch. The approach made them very much more expensive than other cars in the range: the cabriolet cost DM 4,000 more than the coupé on which it was based. Not many Rekord C cabriolets were sold, amid increasing concerns, during the later 1960s, that open topped cars (without roll-over bars) might be more dangerous in the event of a crash than cars with fixed roofs. An alternative cabriolet conversion, based on the Rekord C 2-door sedan, was developed by Karmann of Osnabrück. This never went into anything approaching volume production, although four pre-production examples are believed still to survive.

== The engines ==
=== Four cylinders ===
Opel had introduced a new generation of engines a year earlier with the Rekord B and these were the engines that reappeared in the Rekord C. The engine featured an unusual Camshaft in Head (CIH) engine configuration. The chain-driven camshaft was positioned directly above the cylinders but this was not a conventional ohc design. The camshaft operated the valves using rocker arms because the camshaft itself was positioned too low above the cylinders to permit direct action from the camshaft on the valves heads. One reason for this may have been cosmetic. Other automakers such as BMW with their 1500 launched in 1962 and Volkswagen with their NSU designed K70, which finally made it to the showrooms in 1970, squeezed vital centimeters off the height of the engine unit by canting it over at an eccentric angle in the engine bay. Opel's so-called (CIH) engine configuration similarly enabled the Rekord to incorporate the low bonnet lines that style-conscious product development departments demanded.

The four-cylinder water-cooled 1492 cc unit, known as the "1500", and which first featured the previous year in the Opel Rekord B was now carried over with few significant changes, although an in-house "Carter Licence" carburetter briefly returned (having, in the Rekord B, been replaced by a bought-in carburetter from Zenith or Solex). The "1500" was the entry-level engine in 1966 and came with a claimed maximum power output of 58 PS (43 kW) which in 1969 was raised to 60 PS (44 kW) when the old GM "Carter Licence" carburetter was replaced by a bought-in Solex carburetter. Acceleration figures for the 1498 cc cars were a little slower than on the predecessor model which presumably resulted from the increased weight of the Rekord C. Fuel consumption looks heavy by modern standards, but this was nonetheless the most fuel efficient model in the Rekord line-up, and published data indicate that it was also more fuel efficient than the contemporary Ford 17M and Volkswagen 411. Early in 1970 the 1492 cc unit was withdrawn. Presumably it had cost much the same to produce as the more powerful and more torquey but in most respects identical 1698 cc engine which now-became the entry-level power plant. More significantly, at the end of 1970 Opel would introduce the Opel Ascona, which, being slightly smaller and more modern than the Rekord, would compete more effectively in the 1500 cc class than the relatively underpowered base-level Rekord.

A four-cylinder water-cooled 1698 cc unit had also first appeared in the Rekord B, but only in high compression form. Launching the Rekord C in 1966 Opel introduced a 1698 cc unit with the same lower compression ratio of 8.2:1 as the 1492 cc engine: in this form the engine was known as the "1700". As with the "1500", Opel returned to the old home produced "Carter Licence" carburetter for the first year of production, giving rise to a claimed power output of just 60 PS (44 kW). As with the "1500", so with the "1700", Opel gave up on the self built carburetter after a year, and with a bought-in Solex carburetter, though still with the 8.2:1 compression ratio, claimed power with the "1700" unit was increased to 66 PS (49 kW) in 1967. The "1700" engine powered more Rekord Cs than any of the other engines available for the car. Also offered was a "1700 S" using the same engine block but with a Solex 35 PDSI carburetter and a compression ratio raised to 8,8:1. Powered by this unit, the Rekord came with a claimed maximum power output of 75 PS (55 kW). This, in effect, was the same unit that had been launched in 1965 in the Rekord B 1700S.

The four-cylinder water-cooled 1897 cc unit, providing a maximum 90 PS (66 kW) of power known as the "1900 S" had also first appeared in 1965 in the Rekord B. With a compression ratio of 9.0:1 and a Solex twin chamber 32 DIDTA carburetter it powered the fastest four-cylinder version of the Opel Rekord C at its 1966 launch. However, in November 1967 a new version of the 1897 cc engine appeared with a modified "high efficiency" cylinder head and with the compression ratio further raised – now to 9.5:1 – and, for the first time in a Rekord, two Italian twin chamber Weber 40 DFO carburetters. This engine version, known as the "1900 H", came with a claimed maximum power output of 106 PS (78 kW) which made the car that it powered the most powerful Rekord yet. This was branded as the Opel Rekord Sprint and was initially available as a sedan or a coupé. In January 1969 Opel reported that the Rekord Sprint Coupé had sold much better than the saloon version, and the saloon version was withdrawn.

=== Six cylinders ===
In March 1964, Opel had introduced Rekord customers to the option of a six-cylinder engine, installing a well-tried unit that was already powering the larger Admiral, Kapitän and Diplomat models and could trace its origins back to 1937. The Rekord C range was broadened in December 1966 with the option of an entirely new six-cylinder engine, featuring the cam-in-head valvegear and camshaft configuration of the new four-cylinder engines introduced in 1965. In fact the new six-cylinder engine shared its cylinder dimensions with the entry level Rekord's 1492 cc unit which will have reduced usefully the variety of components needed. However, the six-cylinder engine naturally had an engine capacity 1 1/2 the size or the four-cylinder unit, which gave rise to an engine size of 2239 cc. Claimed power of 95 PS (70 kW) was slightly higher than that of the most powerful 4-cylinder Rekord C at the time of launch, the "1900 S", and the six-cylinder engine also provided a small dividend in terms of improved torque. Performance of the new "2200" Rekord was therefore ahead of that of the "1900 S", but the engine was also relatively heavy and there was a penalty in terms of fuel consumption. The 6-cylinder Rekord C sold only in small numbers, and in August 1968 it was withdrawn from sale. After this there were no more six-cylinder-engined Opel Rekords, although this is when the Rekord "Six" went on sale in South Africa and South-West Africa, as the Commodore nameplate was not offered there. In southern Africa the six-cylinder Rekords were available with four-door sedan or two-door coupé bodywork, and only in combination with an automatic transmission.

By the time they withdrew the six-cylinder Rekord, Opel had launched, in February 1967, the Opel Commodore. This shared the Rekord's body but provided more luxurious trimmings, and it came with a choice from three different sizes of six-cylinder engine. The "2200" engine first seen in the Rekord C in December 1966 was also offered in the new Commodore when it was launched in February 1967. However, most Commodore buyers chose the other (larger) engines, leaving the "2200" version a slow seller in both the Commodore and the Rekord ranges.

== Transmission ==
The standard transmission package for the saloon and estate-bodied Rekord Bs featured a manual all-synchromesh gearbox, controlled by a column-mounted lever. Customers could choose between three or four forward speeds until 1970 after which only the four-speed transmission was offered. The coupe came with a central floor-mounted gear lever, which was also offered as an option with other bodies.

As long as the three-speed transmission was offered customers could specify with it an "Olymat" automatic clutch provided by Fichtel & Sachs. The system was similar to the Fichtel & Sachs "Saxomat" automatic clutch available in the 1960s from several German automakers.

For Rekords with the "1900 S", "1900 H" and "2200" engines it was possible to specify fully automatic transmission. The transmission fitted was a General Motors Powerglide system, well known in North America for more than a decade. The system was simple and durable, but had been designed for use with the larger engines and there were only two forward speeds. In 1968, the "powerglide" two-speed automatic being seen as technically outdated, the manufacturer replaced this with the option of a three-speed TH180 unit from the new General Motors transmission plant in Strasbourg.

== Other technical developments ==
Under the all new body there were numerous technical changes. The wheelbase was 6 cm longer and the car was virtually 6 cm wider than the Rekord B. There was a newly developed front axle with double wishbones, coil springs and an anti-roll bar. The old fashioned simplicity of the rear axle on the previous model gave way to a system involving four trailing arms and coil springs which made for a much more stable ride and much less exciting cornering.

The Rekord B had introduced Rekord buyers to a dual circuit braking system the previous year, and this feature was carried over into the Rekord C along with the brake servo and front-wheel disc brakes.

Passive safety – protection of the driver and passengers in the event of a collision – was being pushed up the agenda in Germany at this time by Mercedes, while internationally some of the same themes were being pursued with evangelical effect by a future candidate for the US presidency called Ralph Nader. Other German and American auto-makers were responding as safety came to the fore as a selling feature. In place of the painted dashboard of the Rekord B, the Rekord C confronted the driver with a padded dashboard and a telescopically collapsible steering column. Furthermore, customers prepared to pay extra could now specify seats belts and head restraints.

The Rekord B had come with a curious "strip speedometer", featuring a coloured line that grew longer as speed increased, and which changed colour from green to yellow to red as the most common speed limit thresholds of 50 km/h and 100 km/h were crossed. Opinions were divided on the strip speedometer, and with the Rekord C Opel reverted to a conventional dial format speedometer, suggesting that for them too, the expanding colour changing strip speedometer had fallen out of fashion.

The front and rear ends of the car were engineered to form crumple zones in order to minimise deformation of the relatively rigid central passenger section of the car in a collision. Specialist journals commended the lack of distortion of the Rekord C's central passenger zone following a succession of crash tests.

== Special editions ==
In October 1967, a bargain basement special "Spar-Rekord" was introduced to the market with a reduced specification and available only in grey. The exercise must have been deemed a success because a second batch of the "Spar-Rekord" was offered, available now in either grey or light blue.

Towards the end of the Rekord C's production run, in July 1971, a special edition "Rekord Holiday" appeared in the showrooms, attractively priced and laden with a package of (normally optional) extras including a steel panel sunroof, supplementary front lights and even a heated rear window.

== Commercial ==
At launch the entry level Rekord C came with a domestic market manufacturer's recommended price of DM 6,980. At the other end of the range a factory built six-cylinder Rekord coupé 2200 cc could be purchased for DM 9,560. The 106 hp Rekord Sprint, when introduced in 1967, was priced at DM 9,775.

The Rekord C was the most successful Rekord to date, and with 1,276,681 produced it was the first Rekord to break through the 1,000,000 units barrier. Another record arose in September 1971 when Opel produced their ten millionth car since the start of production in 1899. Opel number ten million was a Rekord C CarAVan/Kombi (Estate).

As before, the nearest competitor in terms of price, size, power and target market came from Ford. A new Ford Taunus 17M was introduced in 1967 and heavily facelifted in 1968. Between 1967 and 1971 the Ford 17M (now known as the Ford P7) chalked up a total of 710,059 units. The Opel Rekord would never challenge the smaller cheaper Volkswagen Beetle for top slot in the West German sales charts, but the success of the Rekord C and its successors ensured that the Rekord's leading position place in its own class was never again threatened by Ford Germany or anyone else.

The Rekord C was produced for four and a half years. Following the success of the Opel Kadett introduced in the early 1960s and the development of the Opel Ascona introduced in 1970, Opel for the first time since the war had three top selling ranges in the German car market. Nevertheless, the launch of the Opel Rekord D at the start of 1972 marked the end for the Rekord C.

In Mexico, the Rekord C was marketed as the "Opel Rekord Olimpico", celebrating the 1968 Olympic Games. Since then, the Opel brand has not been traded in Mexico; beginning in the late 1990s certain Opel models have been commercialized there under the Chevrolet brand.

== Technical data ==
Opel Rekord C (1966–1971)
| | 1500 | 1700 | 1700 S | 1900 S | 1900 H | 2200 |
| | 1966–1970 | | | | 1967–1971 | 1966–1968 |
|---|---|---|---|---|---|---|
| Engine: | Four-stroke straight-four engine | | | | | Four-stroke straight-six engine |
| Bore × Stroke: | 82.5 mm × 69.8 mm (3.2 in × 2.7 in) | 88.0 mm × 69.8 mm (3.5 in × 2.7 in) | | 93.0 mm × 69.8 mm (3.7 in × 2.7 in) | | 82.5 mm × 69.8 mm (3.2 in × 2.7 in) |
| Displacement: | 1,492 cc (91.0 cu in) | 1,698 cc (103.6 cu in) | | 1,897 cc (115.8 cu in) | | 2,239 cc (136.6 cu in) |
| Maximum power: | 58 PS (43 kW); 1966–1969; 60 PS (44 kW); 1969–1970 | 60 PS (44 kW); 1966–1969; 66 PS (49 kW); 1969–1971 | 75 PS (55 kW) | 90 PS (66 kW) | 106 PS (78 kW) | 95 PS (70 kW) |
| Maximum torque: | 103 N⋅m (76.0 lb⋅ft) at 2500 rpm | 116–118 N⋅m (85.6–87.0 lb⋅ft) at 2300–2550 rpm | 127 N⋅m (93.7 lb⋅ft) at 2700 rpm | 146 N⋅m (107.7 lb⋅ft) at 2800 rpm | 157 N⋅m (115.8 lb⋅ft) at 3650 rpm | 157 N⋅m (115.8 lb⋅ft) at 3200 rpm |
| Compression ratio: | 8.2:1 | 8.2:1 | 8.8:1 | 9.0:1 | 9.5:1 | 8.2:1 |
| Fuel feed: | Opel downdraft carburetor (licensed from Carter); 1966–1969; Single downdraft carburetor (Solex); 1969–1970 | | Single downdraft carburetor (Solex) | Single twin-choke downdraft carburetor (Solex) | Two twin-choke downdraft carburetors (Weber) | Single twin-choke downdraft carburetor (Solex) |
| Valvetrain: | Chain driven single camshaft in head (CIH), two overhead valves per cylinder, short pushrods and stamped-steel rocker arms | | | | | |
| Cooling: | Water-cooled | | | | | |
| Transmission: | 3-speed (1966–1970); 4-speed (1966–1971); Manual, column or floor-mounted shift | | | 3-speed (1966–1970); 4-speed (1966–1971); Manual, column or floor-mounted shift GM Powerglide 2-speed automatic optional (1966–1968); GM "Strasbourg" TH180 3-speed automatic optional (1968–1971) | | |
| Front suspension: | Double wishbone suspension with coil springs | | | | | |
| Rear suspension: | Live axle with four trailing arms, "five-link" suspension arm, coil springs | | | | | |
| Brakes: | Hydraulically activated disc brakes in front, drum brakes at rear | | | | | |
| Body and chassis: | Steel unibody chassis with steel body | | | | | |
| Track front/rear: | 1,412 / 1,410 mm (55.6 / 55.5 in) | | | | | |
| Wheelbase: | 2,668 mm (105.0 in) | | | | | |
| Length: | 4,550 mm (179.1 in) (4,574 mm (180.1 in) Rekord Coupé & Rekord L) | | | | | |
| Unladen weight: | 1,025–1,240 kg (2,260–2,734 lb) | | | | | |
| Top speed: | 130–136 km/h (81–85 mph) | 135–141 km/h (84–88 mph) | 145–153 km/h (90–95 mph) | 152–161 km/h (94–100 mph) | 175 km/h (109 mph) | 155–163 km/h (96–101 mph) |
| 0–100 km/h (0–62 mph): | 24–28 s | 20–24 s | 18–22 s | 16–20 s | 12 s | 15–19 s |
| Fuel consumption: | 11.0 l/100 km 25.7 mpg_{‑imp}; 21.4 mpg_{‑US} (Regular octane) | 12.1 l/100 km 23.3 mpg_{‑imp}; 19.4 mpg_{‑US} (Regular octane) | 11.5 l/100 km 24.6 mpg_{‑imp}; 20.5 mpg_{‑US} (High octane) | 12.0 l/100 km 23.5 mpg_{‑imp}; 19.6 mpg_{‑US} (High octane) | 14.0 l/100 km 20.2 mpg_{‑imp}; 16.8 mpg_{‑US} (High octane) | 13.0 l/100 km 21.7 mpg_{‑imp}; 18.1 mpg_{‑US} (High octane) |

== GM derivatives ==
=== Ranger ===
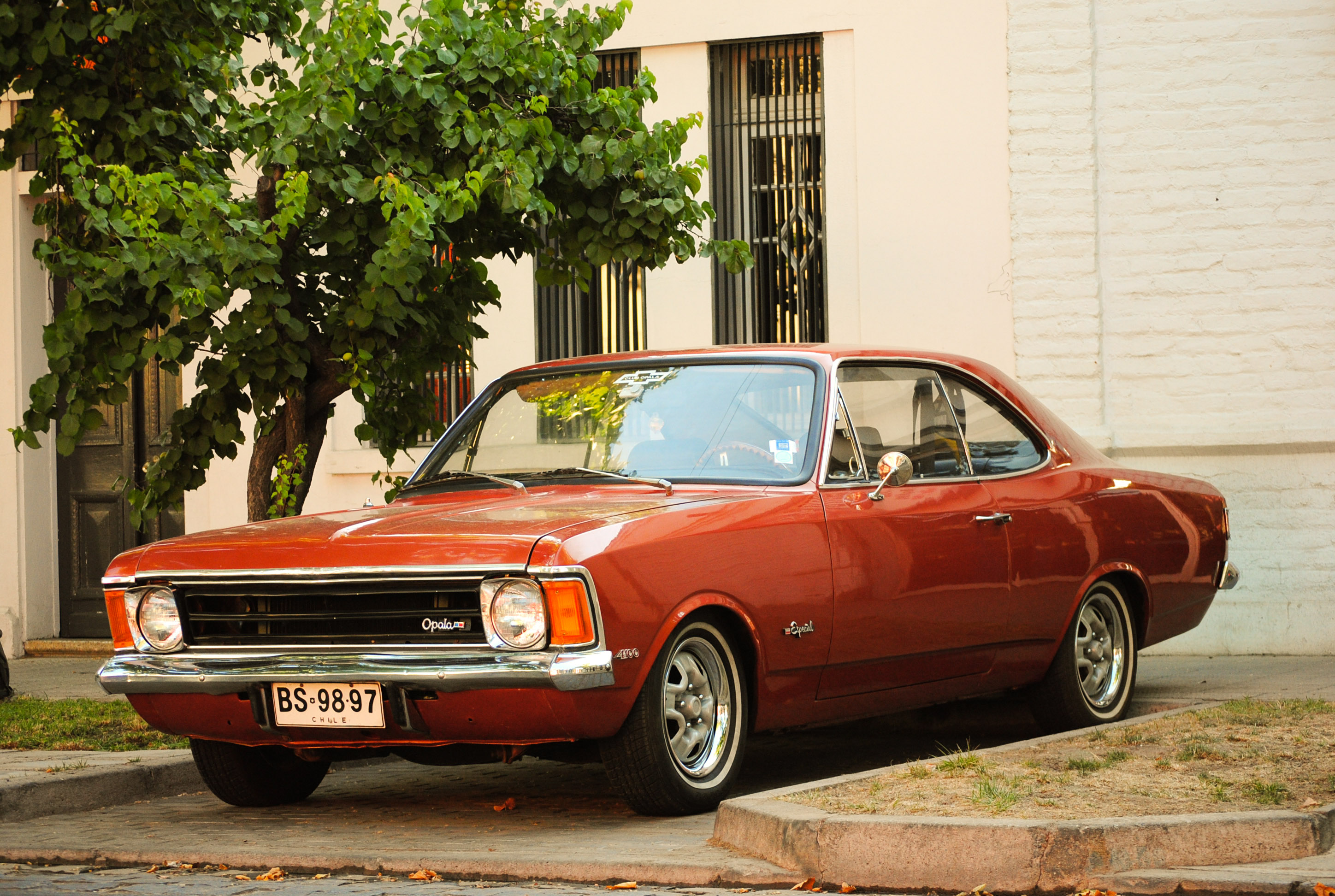
The Chevrolet Opala which used the body of the Opel Rekord C was built in Brazil and also, like this example, exported to Chile after General Motors ceased their Argentinian production

The Ranger was a sedan assembled in small quantities by GM at their plants in Antwerp from 1968 and in Biel from 1970. There were two Rangers built in Europe, the first of which shared most of its panels and many of its underpinnings along, in Europe, with its engines with the Rüsselsheim built Opel Rekord C.

The Ranger was also built at Port Elizabeth in South Africa in the early 1970s. South African Rangers came with Chevrolet engines.

After 1972 a second version of the Ranger, closely based on the Opel Rekord D appeared in Europe. This model also replaced the Ranger in South Africa: here it was now badged not as a Ranger but as a Chevrolet.

=== Opala ===
The Chevrolet Opala flaunted its Opel and Chevrolet origins with a name that combined the words "Opel" and "Impala". It was launched at the São Paulo Motor Show in November 1968, and combined the body of the Opel Rekord C (using a different front grille and lights) with Chevrolet engines. The Brazilian Opala had 2.5-litre or 3.8-litre engines. In 1970, the 3.8 was overhauled to 4.1 litres, which made it Brazil's fastest production car until that title was seized by a 5-litre-engined version of the Ford Maverick.

== See also ==
- Opel Rekord
- Opel Commodore

== Sources ==
Werner Oswald: Deutsche Autos 1945–1975. Motorbuch Verlag, Stuttgart 1975, ISBN 3-87943-391-7, S. 88–93
