= Opel Rekord Series D =

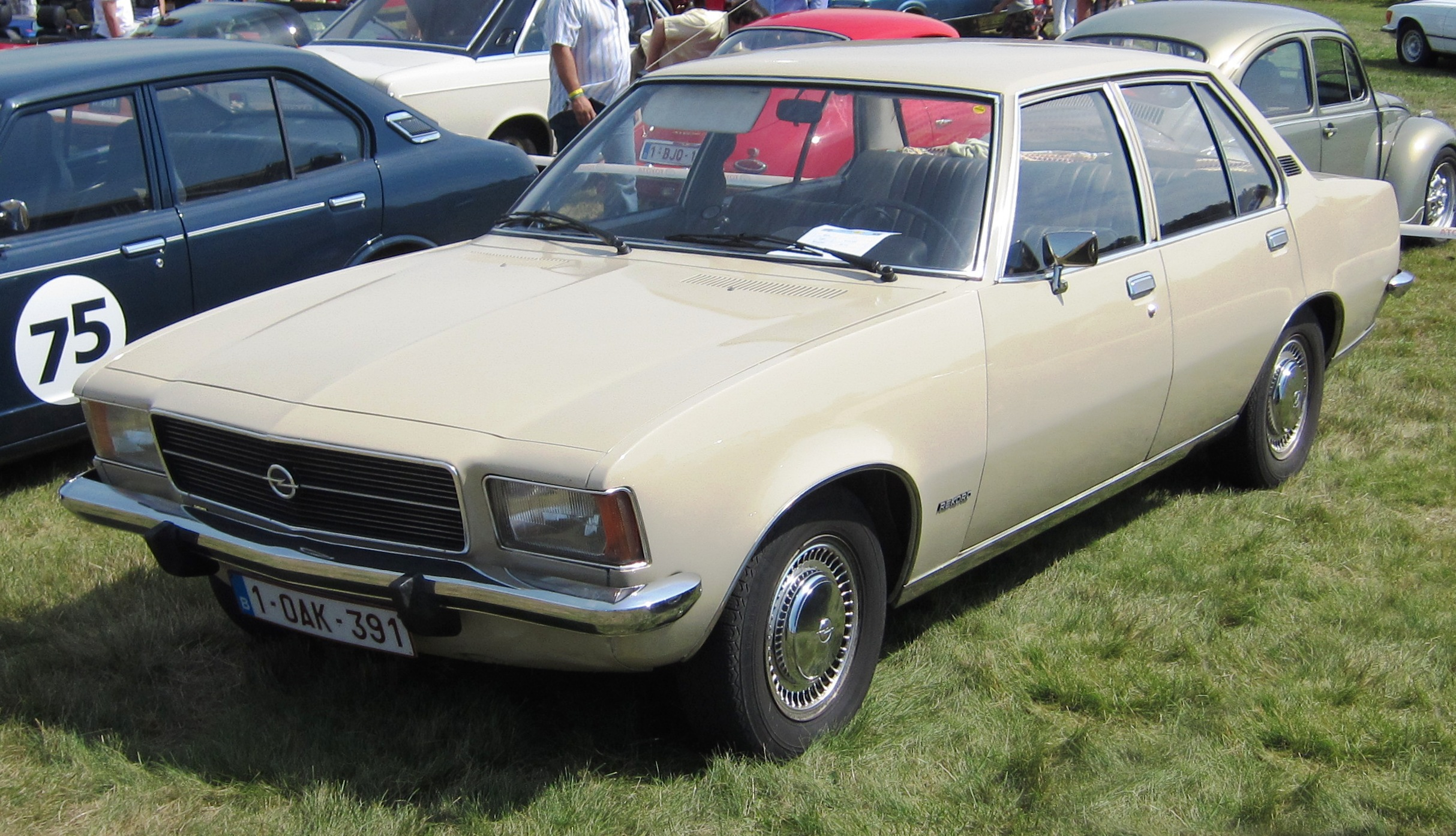

Overview
- Manufacturer: Opel (General Motors)
- Also called: Chevrolet Iran (IR); GMK Rekord (ROK); Ranger 1700/1900/2500 (CH / ZA / B)
- Production: January 1972 – July 1977
- Assembly: Germany: Rüsselsheim; Belgium: Antwerp; Iran: Tehran (GM Iran); South Korea: Bupyeong (GM Korea); South Africa: Port Elizabeth (GMSA); Switzerland: Biel (until 1975)

Body and chassis
- Class: Large family car (D)
- Body style: 2/4-door saloon; 3/5-door estate; 2-door coupé; 3-door van (some export markets only)
- Related: Opel Commodore B Vauxhall Victor FE/VX4

Powertrain
- Engine: petrol: 1698 cc 17N/S CIH I4; 1897 cc 19N/S CIH I4; 1979 cc 20S CIH I4 (from 1975); diesel: 1998 cc OHC I4 (Italy); 2068 cc OHC I4 (from 1972)
- Transmission: 4-speed manual with column shift ("Sportschaltung" floor mounted shift optional on petrol powered versions); 3-speed automatic (optional)

Chronology
- Predecessor: Opel Rekord Series C
- Successor: Opel Rekord Series E

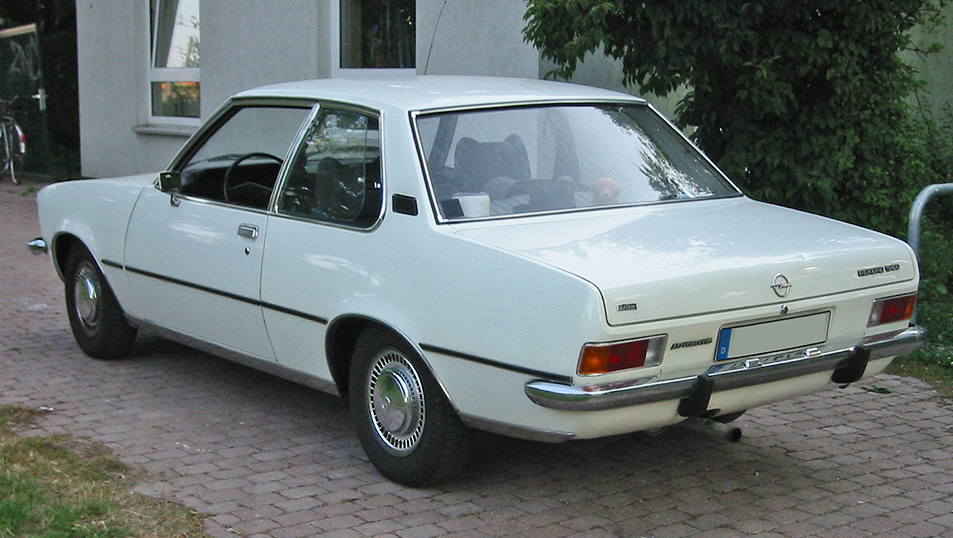
Opel Rekord D 2-door sedan

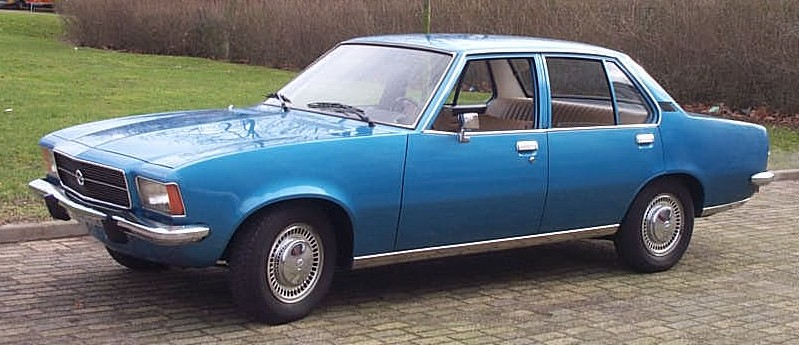
Opel Rekord D 4-door sedan

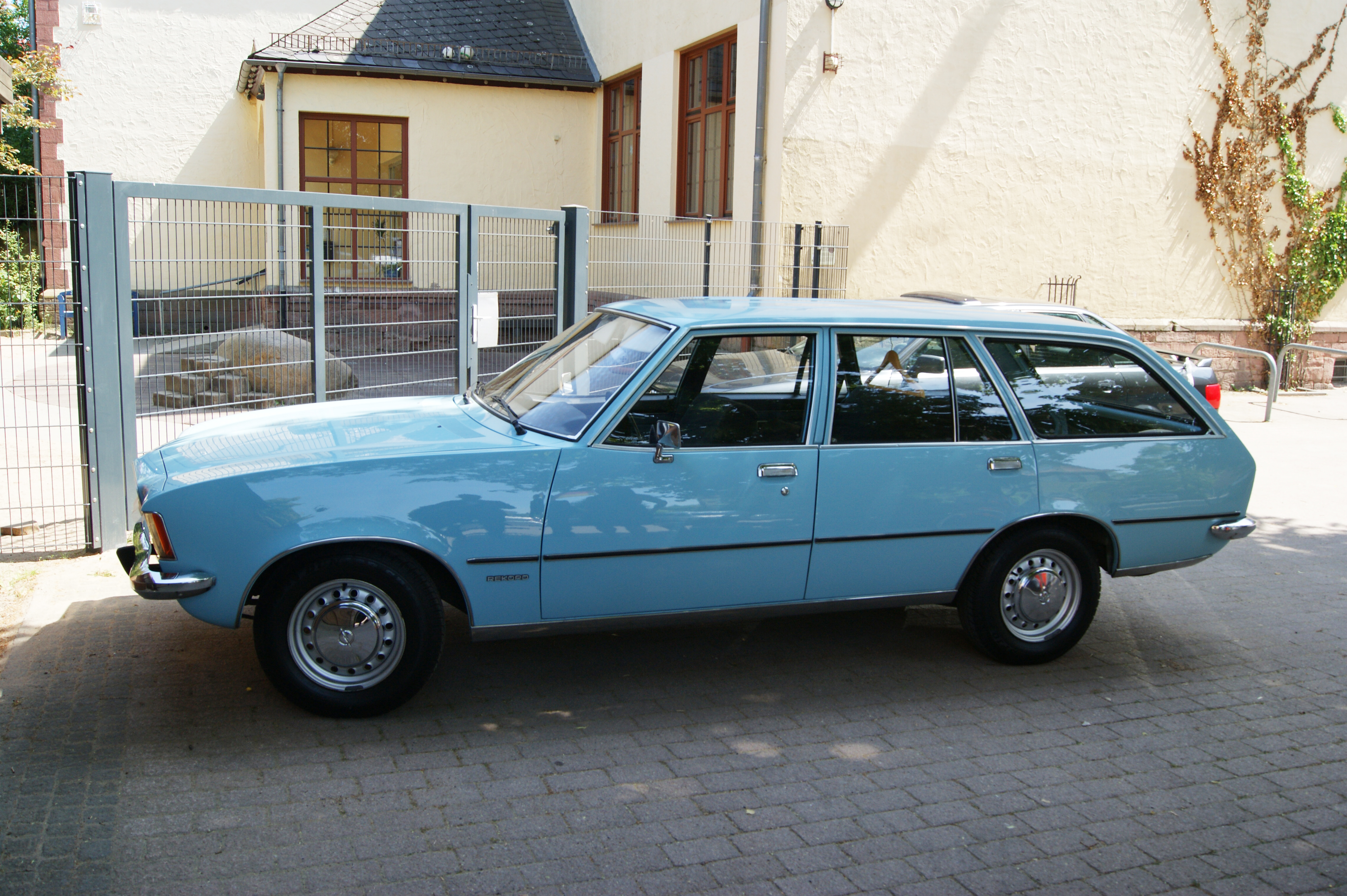
Opel Rekord D Caravan (estate)

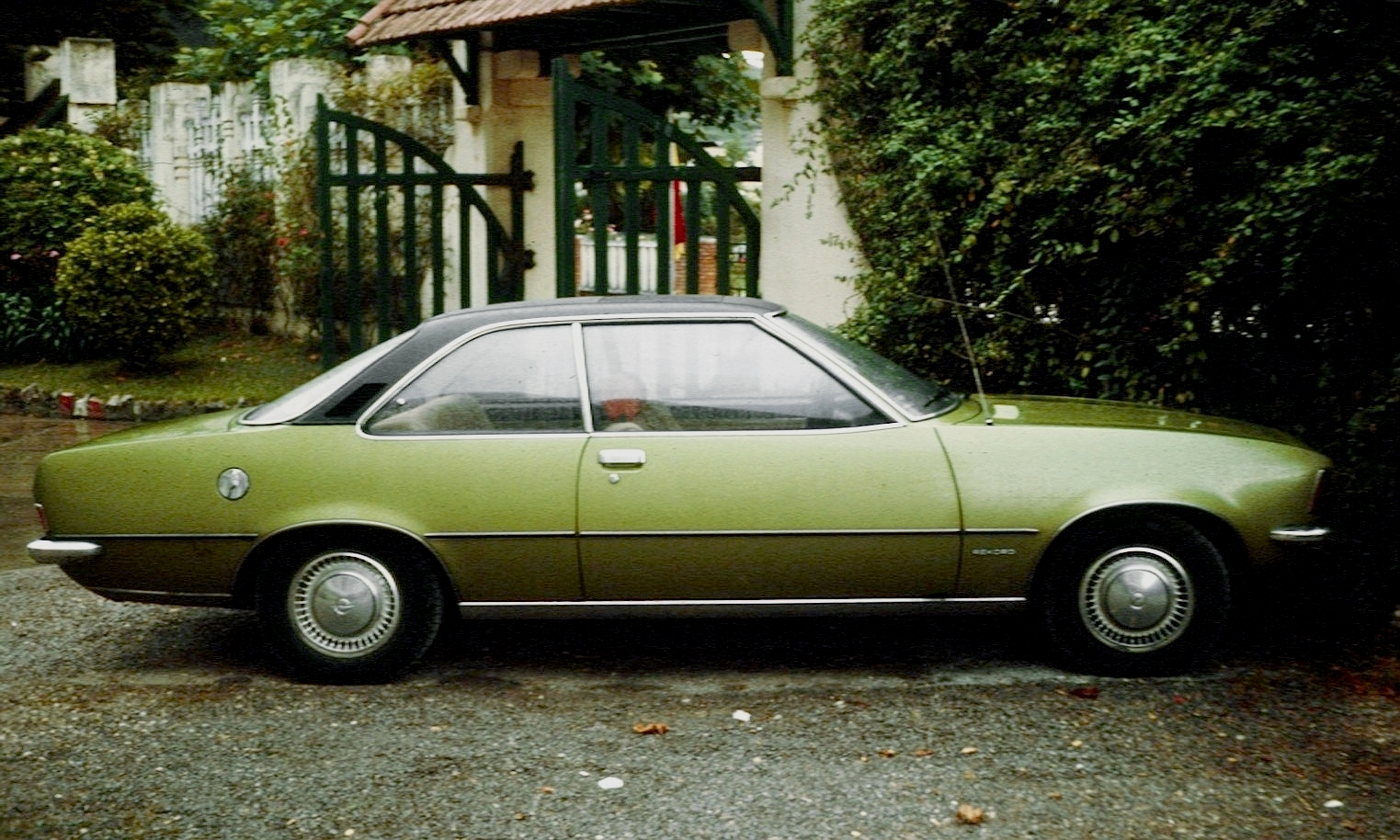
Opel Rekord D 2-door coupé. Vinyl roof coverings were fashionable at this time, and with the Rekord D they had the added advantage that they made the car resemble, for a careless observer, an Opel Commodore

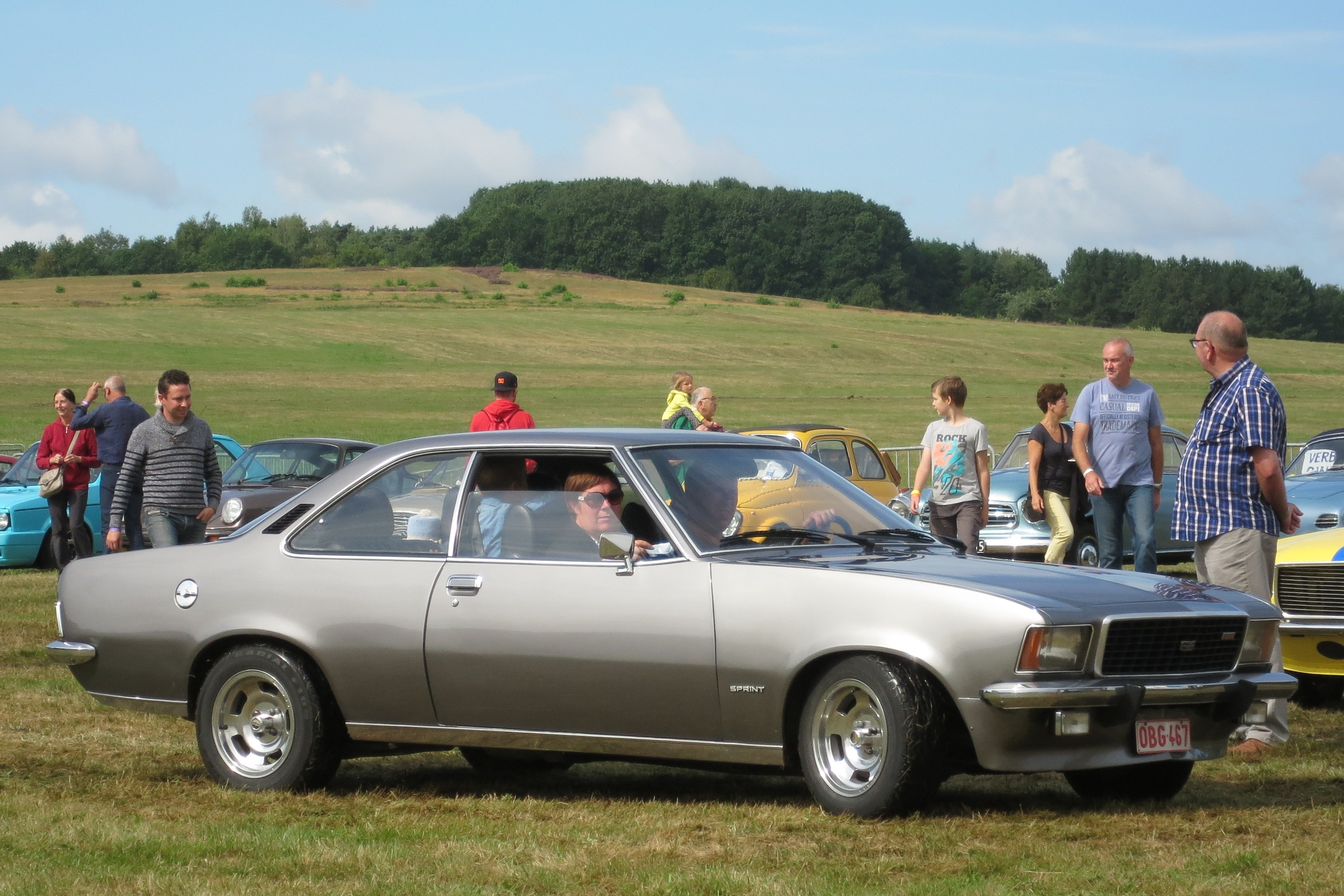
Opel Rekord Sprint Coupé, featuring the Sprint's "all-black" grille

The Opel Rekord Series D is a large family car that replaced the Rekord C on Opel's Rüsselsheim production lines during the closing weeks of 1971 and launched on the West German market at the start of 1972. It shared its wheelbase and inherited most of its engines from its predecessor, but the bodies were completely new. Also new, announced in September 1972, was the option of a diesel powered Opel Rekord. Early advertising and press material called the new car the "Opel Rekord II" but in due course, the "Rekord II" appellation was quietly dropped and the Rekord D was replaced at the end of the 1977 summer holiday shut down by the Opel Rekord E.

The Rekord D's 5½ year production run was longer than that of any previous generation of Opel Rekord: during that period 1,128,196 were produced. It was the second Opel Rekord to exceed the million mark, although its final year saw a marked decrease in demand, as the car was challenged from below after 1975 by the second generation Opel Ascona. By now the increases in fuel prices were encouraging middle market customers to downsize, at a time when the Opel Rekord had, over the years, grown to occupy a market slot at the top end of the "medium-sized" category in northern Europe, being already seen as a "large" family car in Italy and France.

Various cars based on the Rekord D were also built at General Motors plants outside West Germany, both within and beyond Europe.

== The car ==
The car that appeared at the end of December 1971 featured an all-new body styled by Chuck Jordan. The Rekord C's "coke-bottle" style was not repeated, but the new car, with its larger glass area, did introduce a discrete tribute to the Hofmeister kink, a styling cue which had identified BMW cars for ten years. The Rekord D was close in form to the Vauxhall Victor "Transcontinental" launched three months later by Opel's sister company in England. In fact none of the exterior body panels were the same, but the two cars shared their principal floor panel pressings and a number of other components in places where customers would not notice them. Evidently there were close contacts between the teams at Vauxhall and Opel during the development phase. The shared design philosophy and aspirations of the European General Motors cousins are hard to gainsay, however, when the cars are viewed together.

Although the Rekord D followed the Rekord C, early advertising called it, less logically, the Opel Rekord II. There was concern that incorporating the letter "D" might confuse customers in a country where "D" at the end of the name of a "Mercedes-Benz" denoted a diesel engine. At launch the Rekord D, like all previous Rekords, came only with a range of petrol engines.

== The bodies ==
The monocoque steel bodied cars offered seating for five. The new Rekord again came with a wide range of body types. Top seller was the saloon, available with either 2 or 4 doors. There was a "Caravan" estate with three or five doors. For certain export markets such as Austria Opel also offered a three-door delivery van combining the driving experience of a car with the load carrying capability of a small commercial vehicle: this was essentially identical to the estate except that the rear side windows were replaced with metal panels. This offered self-employed traders certain tax advantages, albeit not in West Germany itself where this variant was not offered.

In addition, a factory built Opel Rekord coupé was again offered, although the "pillarless" effect of the Rekord C coupé no longer featured, which will have made it easier to retain the rigidity of the body without unacceptable cost or weight penalties.

There was no longer any sign of the coach built cabriolet conversion that had been offered for earlier Rekords. Karl Deutsch who had provided cabriolet conversions of the Opel Rekord C ceased operations in 1971 as cabriolet conversions fell out of favour in anticipation of safety legislation in North America requiring stout, costly and inelegant roll-over bars on cabriolets.

== The engines ==
=== Petrol ===
Opel had introduced a new generation of petrol engines in 1966 with the Rekord B and these were the engines that reappeared in the Rekord D. As before, the stroke length was fixed at 69.8 mm: differences in engine size were achieved by varying the cylinder bore. The engine featured an unusual Camshaft in Head (CIH) configuration. The chain-driven camshaft was positioned directly above the cylinders but this was not a conventional ohc design. The camshaft operated the valves using rocker arms because the camshaft itself was positioned too low above the cylinders to permit direct action from the camshaft on the valves ends. One reason for this may have been cosmetic. Opel's so-called "CIH" engine configuration allowed the Rekord to incorporate the low bonnet lines that style-conscious product development departments called for.

Although the Rekord D shared its wheelbase with its predecessor, in other respects it respected the tendency of Opel Rekords to move slightly upmarket with each new model. The Rekord D was heavier than the Rekord C and the previous model's 1492 cc engine was no longer offered. The smallest power unit at launch, and the one that would be the top seller with this model, was a 1698 cc engine with the low 8.2:1 compression ratio and 66 PS (49 kW) as on the predecessor. The 1698 cc unit was also offered with a twin barrel carburetter and a compression ratio of 9.8:1, offering a maximum power output of 83 PS (61 kW) and much improved torque. Drivers of this "1700 S" engined Rekord had to pay for higher octane fuel, however, and there was also a price to be paid in terms of reduced fuel economy.

Customers wanting more performance from their Rekord could specify the "1900 S" engine of 1897 cc, providing a maximum power output of 97 PS (71 kW) supported by a 9.8:1 compression ratio and a twin chamber carburetter. Like the high compression "1700 S" unit, the "1900 S" needed high octane fuel, but it did provide a top speed of 165 km/h, making it good for more than 100 mph in non-metric export markets. This was the fastest Opel Rekord D on launch, there being no longer any six-cylinder engined Rekords. Anyone wishing to buy a Rekord bodied car with a six-cylinder engine would need to pay also for the enhanced specification of the six-cylinder Opel Commodore with which the Rekord again shared its body.

Early on in the Rekord D's production, Opel also released SAE power figures alongside the DIN norm, with the 1900 S engine producing a claimed 105 PS (77 kW) at 5200 rpm and 17.1 kg⋅m (168 N⋅m; 124 lb⋅ft) at 3800 rpm under SAE standards. This was the only engine offered by Opel's Japanese importer.

In 1975, the Petrol lead law came into force, more than halving the amount of lead that could be added to petrol in West Germany. Similar legislation came into effect in key export markets across western Europe. For the oil companies the addition of lead to fuel provided a simple and inexpensive way to vary octane levels. Having lobbied vigorously against the legislative restrictions, they now responded by reducing fuel octane ratings on the forecourts. The 98 octane fuel on which the Rekord's high compression engines depended was reduced in the super grade fuel normally available, while low lead 98 octane fuel became hard to find and very expensive. For the entry level Opel Rekord "1700 N" claimed maximum power was reduced, in 1975, by 6 PS to 60 PS (44 kW). The high compression "1700 S" version was withdrawn, and the range was extended by a low compression version of the 1897 cc unit, sometimes known as the "1900 N" and providing a maximum power of 75 PS (55 kW) and a compression ratio of just 7.6:1. The "1900 S" high compression ratio version of this engine had its maximum power reduced from 97 to 90 PS (71 to 66 kW) reflecting a compression ratio reduced from 9.8:1 to 8.8:1, which enabled it to use the new reduced octane "super" grade fuels without knocking. In some markets, such as Sweden and Switzerland, emissions controls were even stricter and the new engine produced only 88 PS (65 kW), while the 1700 engine was discontinued there.

To compensate for the loss of performance on the "1900 S" Opel now increased the cylinder bores further and introduced, in September 1975, a 1979 cc version of the engine for their Rekord "2000 S". 100 PS (74 kW) of maximum power was claimed for what was the fastest Rekord from this generation. Neither its power nor its performance matched the "1900 H" version of the old 106 hp Opel Rekord C however, which presumably reflected changed priorities in the market place following the fuel shortages and price shocks of the mid 1970s.

=== Diesel ===
September 1972 saw the introduction of the first diesel powered Opel Rekord, with which the manufacturer launched a determined assault on the lucrative stranglehold that Mercedes-Benz enjoyed over the taxi market in West Germany and, to varying extents, in many of the export markets where the firms competed. The four cylinder 2068 cc diesel unit was not based on the Rekord's "CIH" petrol engines, but was a newer design. The "Caravan" estate was originally not available with the diesel engine, but a five-door diesel estate was added to the lineup at the 1973 Frankfurt Motor Show (September).

The fuel feed system employed a Bosch diesel injection pump. The unit's basic architecture applied a conventional ohc configuration which made it a little taller than the Rekord's petrol engines, and diesel powered Rekord Ds are therefore easily distinguishable by the hump shaped ridge along the centre of the bonnet.

For certain export market, notably Italy, where the 2-litre engine size was a critical threshold in terms of car tax rates, a smaller diesel unit became available from December 1974. The smaller unit shared the 85 mm stroke of the 2068 cc unit, but the bore was reduced from 88 mm to 86.5 mm, giving rise to a 1998 cc overall displacement. Maximum power in the smaller diesel came down from the 2068 cc car's 60 PS (44 kW) to 58 PS (43 kW). This was a first outing for the 2-litre diesel engine which from 1978 was offered in a diesel powered version of the Opel Ascona.

== Transmission ==
The standard transmission package for the saloon and estate bodied Rekord Ds featured a manual all-synchromesh four-speed gearbox, controlled on the early versions by a column mounted lever. A centrally positioned floor-mounted gear lever, marketed as a "Sportschaltung" (sports gear change) was available from the start on petrol fueled cars, initially as an optional extra and later as a standard feature.

Buyers of all but the smallest engined cars could also specify a three-speed automatic transmission. The system used was the three-speed TH180 unit from the manufacturer's new transmission plant in Strasbourg.

== Suspension, steering and brakes ==
Steering and suspension layouts were based on those from the Rekord C. The front suspension employed double wishbones of unequal length with an anti-roll bar, springs and shock-absorbers. The steering used a recirculating ball system and was controlled via a collapsible steering column. At the back there was a live axle tamed with four trailing connector arms, a Panhard rod like system and an anti-roll bar, the wheels being sprung, as at the front, using "progressive rate" coil springs and shock absorbers.

The braking configuration was also essentially that from the previous Rekord, with a dual circuit hydraulically controlled system along with the brake servo as before, with the addition, on larger engined versions, of a brake force limiter for the rear brakes. The car used disc brakes at the front and drum brakes at the back.

== Trims and markets ==
For the Rekord D, various different packages of trims and options were offered. There was a "base" Rekord, a luxury version branded as the "Rekord L" and a "Rekord Sprint" with more sporting trim that included a matt black front grille and equipment that included several additional dials such as a rev counter. 1975 saw the introduction in of the "Rekord Berlina" which offered a still more opulent level of comfort and equipment.

When, after less than four years, production of the Rekord D reached a million in 1976, the manufacturer celebrated the achievement by offering a special edition "Rekord Millionär" in September 1976. Other special editions included the "Rekord Maharadscha", the "Rekord Hit" and the "Rekord Sport".

The Rekord was sold in most European markets and also farther afield, not only through the license built versions. Many markets received local tax specials, such as the windowless vans offered in Austria and several other markets. Italy received a sub-2 liter version of the diesel engine introduced in December 1974. Japanese buyers received only the 1900 S engine although they could choose between the four-door sedan, two-door coupé, or a sporting SR coupé with a matte black bonnet and full instrumentation. The automatic transmission was optional, as was right-hand drive.

== Commercial ==
The Opel Rekord D received a warm welcome in the market place at the end of 1971, described by some as "the best BMW ever to come out of Hessen" ("Es galt als bester BMW, der je aus Hessen kam") on account of a style and dynamic qualities worthy of a BMW (made in Bavaria) rather than an Opel (made in Hessen). But since this was an Opel the price was competitive: competing models such as the Volkswagen 411 were seen as having somehow missed the mark by comparison. With 1,128,196 cars sold in slightly more than 5½ years, the Rekord D was the second Opel Rekord to beat a million units. The million units target was in fact breached in the late summer of 1976: The Rekord D nevertheless sold at a slightly slower rate than its predecessor, and sales slowed towards the end of its production run.

The oil crisis of 1973 had a lasting impact on European sales of larger cars as customers perceived that the "era of (relatively) cheap fuel" was gone for ever. In 1975 Opel introduced a second generation of their Opel Ascona, half a class smaller than the Rekord, and home grown competition in Opel's showrooms came from the Ascona which can be seen as the Rekord's deadliest competitor during the second half of the 1970s. Among cars closer in size to its own class the Audi 100, introduced in 1968 but with initial availability hampered by shortage of production capacity, also became an increasingly formidable competitor for the Opel Rekord as the decade advanced.

== Technical data ==
Opel Rekord D (1971–1977)
	1700	1700 S	1900	1900 S		2000 S	2100 Diesel
		1971–1975	1975–1977	1975–1977	1971–1975	1975–1977	1972–1977
Engine:	Straight-four Petrol engine						Straight-four Diesel engine
Bore × Stroke:	88 mm × 69.8 mm (3.5 in × 2.7 in)		93 mm × 69.8 mm (3.7 in × 2.7 in)			95 mm × 69.8 mm (3.7 in × 2.7 in)	88 mm × 85 mm (3.5 in × 3.3 in)
Displacement:	1,698 mm (66.9 in)		1,897 mm (74.7 in)			1,979 mm (77.9 in)	2,068 mm (81.4 in)
Maximum power:	66 PS (49 kW) at 5300 rpm 1971–1975; 60 PS (44 kW) at 4800 rpm 1975–1977	83 PS (61 kW) at 5400 rpm	75 PS (55 kW) at 4800 rpm	90 PS (66 kW) at 4400 rpm	97 PS (71 kW) at 4800 rpm	100 PS (74 kW) at 5200 rpm	60 PS (44 kW) at 4400 rpm
Maximum torque:	118 N⋅m (87 lb⋅ft) at 2600 rpm 1971–1975; 112 N⋅m (83 lb⋅ft) at 2500 rpm 1975–1977	127 N⋅m (94 lb⋅ft) at 3200 rpm	132 N⋅m (97 lb⋅ft) at 2800 rpm	145 N⋅m (107 lb⋅ft) at 3800 rpm	147 N⋅m (108 lb⋅ft) at 3800 rpm	155 N⋅m (114 lb⋅ft) at 3600 rpm	118 N⋅m (87 lb⋅ft) at 2500 rpm
Compression ratio:	8.2:1; 1971–1975; 8.0:1; 1975–1977	9.2:1	7.6:1	8.8:1	9.8:1	9.0:1	22.0:1
Fuel feed:	Single downdraft carburetor (Solex)	Single twin-choke downdraft carburetor (Solex)					Bosch diesel injection pump
Valvetrain:	Chain-driven single camshaft in head (CIH), two overhead valves per cylinder, short tappets and stamped-steel rocker arms						Chain-driven camshaft, two overhead valves per cylinder
Cooling:	Water-cooled						
Transmission:	4-speed manual: column or floor-mounted shift		4–speed manual: column or floor-mounted shift GM "Strasbourg" TH180 3-speed automatic optional				4-speed manual: column shift
Front suspension:	Double wishbone suspension with coil springs						
Rear suspension:	Live axle with four trailing arms, "five-link" suspension arm and coil springs						
Brakes:	Servo-assisted hydraulically activated disc brakes in front, drum brakes at rear with brake force limiter on larger engined cars						
Body and chassis:	Steel unibody chassis with steel body						
Track front/rear:	1,419 / 1,400 mm (55.9 / 55.1 in)						
Wheelbase:	2,668 mm (105.0 in)						
Length:	4,567 / 4,635 mm (179.8 / 182.5 in)						
Unladen weight:	1,065–1,230 kg (2,348–2,712 lb)						
Top speed:	135–143 km/h (84–89 mph)	155–160 km/h (96–99 mph)	145–150 km/h (90–93 mph)	155–160 km/h (96–99 mph)	160–165 km/h (99–103 mph)	165–170 km/h (103–106 mph)	127–135 km/h (79–84 mph)
0–100 km/h (0–62 mph):	20–26 s	16–18.5 s	17–20 s	15–17.5 s	14–16.5 s	13–14 s	23.5–32 s
Fuel consumption:	12.0–13.5 l/100 km 23.5–20.9 mpg_{‑imp}; 19.6–17.4 mpg_{‑US} (Regular octane)	12.5–14.0 l/100 km 22.6–20.2 mpg_{‑imp}; 18.8–16.8 mpg_{‑US} (High octane)	12.5–14.0 l/100 km 22.6–20.2 mpg_{‑imp}; 18.8–16.8 mpg_{‑US} (High octane)	12.5–14.0 l/100 km 22.6–20.2 mpg_{‑imp}; 18.8–16.8 mpg_{‑US} (High octane)	12.5–14.0 l/100 km 22.6–20.2 mpg_{‑imp}; 18.8–16.8 mpg_{‑US} (High octane)	12.0–13.5 l/100 km 23.5–20.9 mpg_{‑imp}; 19.6–17.4 mpg_{‑US} (High octane)	8.0–9.5 l/100 km 35.3–29.7 mpg_{‑imp}; 29.4–24.8 mpg_{‑US} (Diesel)

== GM derivatives ==
=== Ranger ===
The Ranger was a sedan assembled in small quantities by GM at their plants in Antwerp from 1968 and in Biel from 1970. There were two Rangers built in Europe, the first of which shared most of its panels and many of its underpinnings along, in Europe, with its engines with the Rüsselsheim built Opel Rekord C.

The second Ranger replaced the first in 1972 and was closely based on Rüsselsheim's Opel Rekord D. This second Ranger, known as the Ranger B, was built only at the Antwerp plant. It was first shown alongside the Rekord D at the 1972 Geneva Salon. It was available with the 1697 cc (83 hp) or 1897 cc (97 hp) four-cylinder engines from the Rekord, or two versions of the 2.5 litre six-cylinder engines as fitted to the Rekord's more luxurious sibling, the Opel Commodore. The Ranger B had twin headlights in place of the Rekord/Commodore's single rectangular lights, repositioned front direction indicators and a reworked front grille with a horizontal bar. There was a stylish raised section on the bonnet which was different from the one used on diesel-engined Rekords, and the rear panel also incorporates detail differences. The Rangers were not strikingly more expensive than equivalently powered Rekords and Commodores, but nor were they perceived as sufficiently differentiated, and Rangers were quietly withdrawn from the showrooms by late 1975.

=== Chevrolets in South Africa and Iran ===
In South Africa, December 1972 saw the introduction of the Chevrolet 3800, and the Chevrolet 4100. In 1973 the four-cylinder 2500 version arrived, replacing the Rekord C-based Ranger. This smaller engine was a four-cylinder iteration of the 3800 straight-six. The engines were indeed sourced from Chevrolet but the cars were otherwise simply locally produced versions of the Opel Rekord D from which, apart from the engines, they differed very little. The 3800 and the 4100 were mostly the same, with the 3800 receiving a more spartan interior with vinyl seats and without standard head rests, and with different hubcaps. As with the European Ranger, they have twin round headlights rather than the Rekord's rectangular units. Engine outputs are 104.4 and 115.6 kW (142 and 157 PS; 140 and 155 hp) respectively.

The 2500, which arrived a bit later to help replace the Firenza 2500, was also available as an estate.

The big Chevrolet engines necessitated a bonnet with a "power bulge", although it is wider and lower than the bulge used on the Rekord Diesel's bonnet. They also had larger fuel tanks as petrol was subject to market controls in South Africa at the time. The suspension was uprated, and used locally developed variable-rate coil springs. The six-cylinder engines were built in South Africa but had hitherto been restricted to installation in larger, Holden-sourced cars. This series was South Africa's number one seller in 1975, although it dropped to third the next year and all the way to fifteenth in 1977. Larger cars received an ever-smaller market share in South Africa as sanctions began to kick in and gas prices increased steadily. It was replaced this year by the Chevrolet Rekord, a rebadged Rekord E with a Chevrolet four-cylinder.

The Rekord D (then the commodore B) was also assembled in Iran (before the revolution) from 1974 until 1977, albeit powered by 2 type of GM six-cylinder engines(2500 ,2800 cc). In Iran, the car was branded as the "Chevrolet Iran" (Types: 2500-2800- Royal-custom) and was assembled by Iran General Motors.

== See also ==
- Opel Rekord
- Opel Commodore

== Sources ==
Werner Oswald: Deutsche Autos 1945–1975. Motorbuch Verlag, Stuttgart 1975, ISBN 3-87943-391-7, S. 88–93
