= Ranger (automobile) =

Automobile brand of General Motors

- Product type: Automobile
- Current owner: General Motors
- Produced by: General Motors
- Country: South Africa, Belgium, Switzerland, Netherlands
- Introduced: 1968
- Discontinued: 1978; 48 years ago
- Markets: South Africa; Europe

Ranger was an automobile brand of General Motors which was produced from 1968 to 1978. Used in three main markets, the original automobile was marketed as "South Africa's Own Car" and was built in Port Elizabeth, South Africa, from 1968 to 1973. The European model range was sold in two main markets, Belgium and Switzerland. It was produced by General Motors Continental SA from 1970 to 1978 in Antwerp, Belgium. General Motors Suisse SA in Biel-Bienne, Switzerland, also produced Rangers from 1970 until that factory's closure in 1975. A few Rangers were also sold in the Netherlands.

The cars built in this period were a mixture of parts from other General Motors products and featured a body shell similar to the Opel Rekord but with a Vauxhall Victor FD grille, and internal parts from various large Vauxhalls and Holdens, although the European Rangers had very little to differentiate them from Opels. However, as the second generation cars became even closer to models marketed by Chevrolet in South Africa and Opel in Europe, it was decided that this kind of brand was irrelevant and thus the marque was discontinued. A 1972 Belgian road test of the Ranger 2500 even begins by calling the existence of the Ranger brand hard to explain. The Ranger B was built only in Antwerp, and sold only in a few select European markets.

== South Africa ==
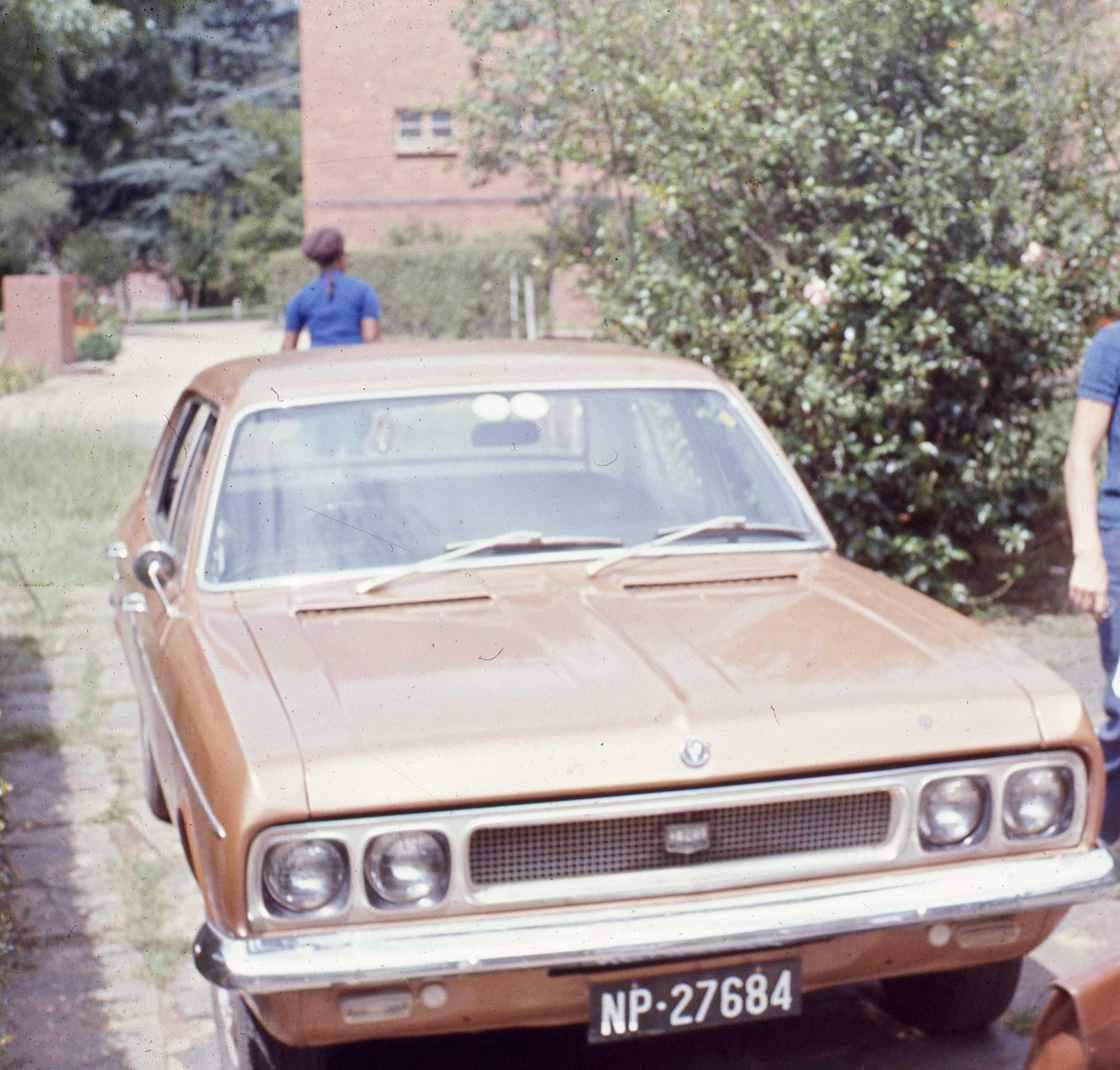
Ranger pictured in South Africa in 1974

South Africa received the Ranger A only, introduced in the summer of 1968. The South African Rangers had a stylized springbok logo until 1970, when a copyright conflict with the South African athletic association put a halt to further use - not entirely surprising, as use of the Springbok name had already been ruled out on such grounds. General Motors South Africa had two parallel sales networks at the time, Chevrolet/Opel and Pontiac/Vauxhall. After the Victor 101 (FC) was discontinued it was replaced by the Ranger rather than the new Victor FD. The Ranger was better able to meet local content targets set by the South African government.

In April 1970 the sporty SS model arrived. Rather than the standard 2.5-liter model's 90 hp (67 kW) SAE (76.5 bhp net), the SS has 108 hp (81 kW) SAE at 4400 rpm, thanks to a twin-choke Weber carburettor, better breathing, and a performance exhaust system. The SS also received a chromed air cleaner and valve covers, a vinyl roof, twin exhaust tips, and other sporty embellishments.

It was mostly based on the European Opel Rekord, with a locally built engine of Chevrolet origin and the grille and headlights of the Vauxhall Victor. The Rekord bodywork was slightly altered to accommodate the different grille. The steering was also from Vauxhall, as was the suspension, which gave the car a somewhat wider track than the Opel. Early cars came in for some criticism as some of the parts did not quite match up; for instance, while the car's gearing was raised, the speedo drive was unchanged, causing grossly inaccurate readings. The brand was discontinued after only a few years. The engines were referred to by their displacement in cubic inches, part of an attempt of differentiating the car from its Opel counterpart. There were the 130, the 153, and the 153HC (high compression) to choose from, with the more powerful SS version added later.

The Ranger was discontinued in 1973, without a direct replacement in the South African market. The Opel Rekord D, successor to the Rekord C upon which the Ranger was based, was originally sold in South Africa as the Chevrolet 3800 or 4100. When they were introduced, GM South Africa made it a point to state that the Ranger lineup was not affected by the new car. Nonetheless, soon a 2500 model of the Rekord D appeared and not long thereafter the Ranger line was gone.

=== Lineup ===
- 2.1 L (4-cylinder engine) 2/4-door saloon
- 2.1 L (4-cylinder engine) 3/5-door station wagon
- 2.1 L (4-cylinder engine) 2-door coupé
- 2.5 L (4-cylinder engine) 4-door saloon
- 2.5 L (4-cylinder engine) 5-door station wagon
- 2.5 L (4-cylinder engine) 2-door coupé
- 2.5 L (4-cylinder engine) SS 2-door coupé (from April 1970)

== Europe ==
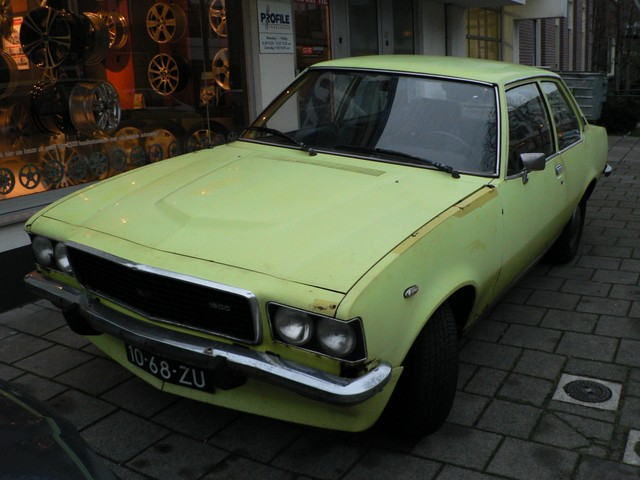
1972 Ranger 1900 (Netherlands)

The existence of the Ranger brand was a result of General Motors continuing a policy of theirs in the United States, with a number of brands competing directly with each other. General Motors Continental and GM Suisse had hitherto attempted to compete with Opel in their respective markets by selling Vauxhalls, but dealers were complaining as Vauxhall products were becoming less and less competitive vis-à-vis their Opel cousins. To flesh out the range and help their dealers in the marketplace, General Motors Suisse responded with the Rekord-based Ranger in February 1970. Belgium received their Ranger versions in November 1970, with an additional 1700 model at the bottom of the lineup. Other alternatives had also been considered, including the Brazilian Chevrolet Opala and Australia's Holden Torana. Unlike the Chevrolet-engined South African Ranger, Belgian Rangers all received Opel engines.

The Ranger A, like its South African counterpart, had a Vauxhall-style grille. Sold by dealers alongside Vauxhalls, the lineup was carefully limited so as not to compete directly with Vauxhall's four-door only Victor, and thus the smaller-engined Ranger As were usually only available as two-doors. At Geneva 1971, General Motors Continental and General Motors Suisse presented the new Ranger B alongside its Opel Rekord D twin. Aside from some minor trim differences, including twin headlights and a grille with a crossbar, as well as different taillights and a rear license plate mounted higher than on the Rekord. The Ranger B used a "humped" bonnet, similar to the one used on Rekord D diesels. In early 1974, the twin-carb 2500 GTS was replaced by the 140 PS (103 kW) 2800 GTS, only available as a coupé.

The Swiss plant received most of its parts from Germany, utilizing up to 15 percent local material (tires, upholstery, glass, etcetera) to save on import tariffs. Some parts were brought in from England and South Africa as well, however. As Swiss wages increased the plant, with its small numbers, became unprofitable and it was closed in the middle of 1975. The Belgian Rangers continued to be available, in an ever-shrinking lineup, until 1978 when the new Opel Rekord (E) appeared.

=== Belgian lineup ===
Ranger A (1970–1972)

- 1.7 L (Opel 17S CIH 4-cylinder engine) 2-door saloon
- 1.9 L (Opel 19S CIH 4-cylinder engine) 2-door saloon
- 1.9 L (Opel 19S CIH 4-cylinder engine) 2-door coupé
- 2.5 L (Opel 25S CIH 6-cylinder engine) 4-door saloon
- 2.5 L (Opel 25S CIH 6-cylinder engine) 2-door coupé
- 2.5 L (Opel 25H CIH 6-cylinder engine) 2-door coupé (twin carburetors)

Ranger B, marketed as Ranger II (1972–1978)

- 1.7 L (Opel 17N CIH 4-cylinder engine, regular petrol) 2-door saloon (1972–1976)
- 1.7 L (Opel 17S CIH 4-cylinder engine, super petrol) 2-door saloon (1972–1976)
- 1.7 L (Opel 17S CIH 4-cylinder engine, super petrol) 2-door coupé (1972–1976)
- 1.9 L (Opel 19N CIH 4-cylinder engine, normal petrol) 2-door saloon (1976–1978)
- 1.9 L (Opel 19N CIH 4-cylinder engine, normal petrol) 2-door coupé (1976–1978)
- 1.9 L (Opel 19SH CIH 4-cylinder engine, super petrol) 2-door saloon (1972–1978)
- 1.9 L (Opel 19SH CIH 4-cylinder engine, super petrol) 2-door coupé (1972–1978)
- 2.5 L (Opel 25S CIH 6-cylinder engine) 4-door saloon (1972–1977)
- 2.5 L (Opel 25S CIH 6-cylinder engine) 2-door coupé (1972–1977)
- 2.5 L (Opel 25H CIH 6-cylinder engine) 2-door coupé (twin carburettors)
- 2.8 L (Opel 28HL CIH 6-cylinder engine) 2-door coupé GTS (1974-197?)

=== Swiss lineup ===
Ranger A (1970–1972)

- 1.9 L (Opel 19S CIH 4-cylinder engine) 2-door saloon
- 1.9 L (Opel 19S CIH 4-cylinder engine) 2-door coupé
- 2.5 L (Opel 25S CIH 6-cylinder engine) 4-door saloon
- 2.5 L (Opel 25S CIH 6-cylinder engine) 2-door coupé
- 2.5 L (Opel 25H CIH 6-cylinder engine) 2-door coupé (twin carburetors)

Ranger B (1972–1975)

- 1.9 L (Opel 19S CIH 4-cylinder engine) 2-door saloon
- 1.9 L (Opel 19S CIH 4-cylinder engine) 4-door saloon
- 1.9 L (Opel 19S CIH 4-cylinder engine) 2-door coupé
- 2.5 L (Opel 25S CIH 6-cylinder engine) 4-door saloon
- 2.5 L (Opel 25H CIH 6-cylinder engine) 2-door coupé (twin carburettors)
- 2.8 L (Opel 28H CIH 6-cylinder engine) 2-door coupé GTS (twin carburettors, from 1974)

== Bibliography ==
- Georgano, G.N., Editor (1985). The Complete Encyclopedia of Motorcars 1885 to the present. Guild Publishing. pp. 512.
