= Ford Cortina =

Car model produced by Ford (1962–1984)

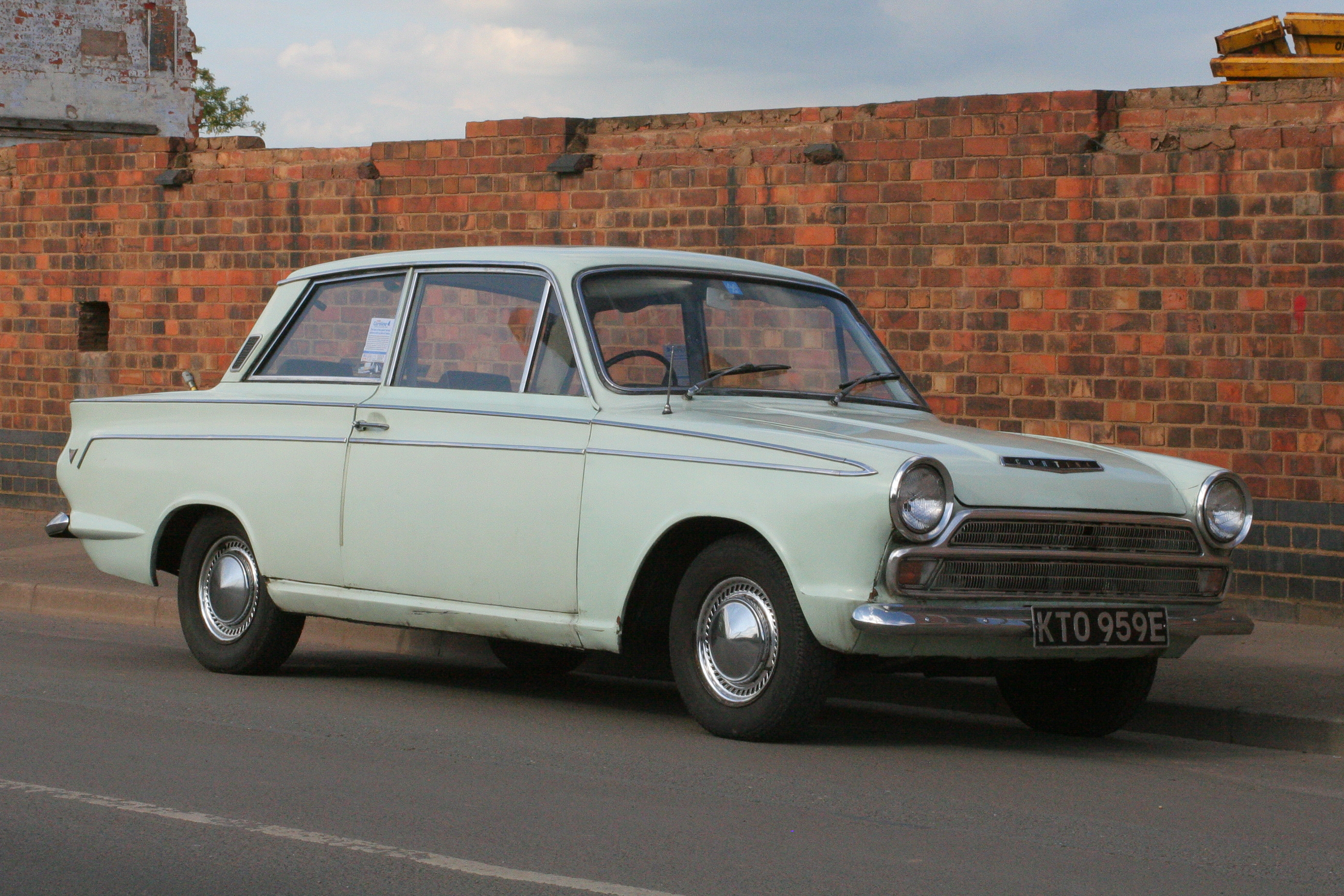
- Ford Cortina Super two-door saloon ("Mark 1b")

Overview
- Manufacturer: Ford UK
- Also called: Ford Consul Cortina
- Production: 1962–1982 (Europe & Australia); 1970–1984 (South Africa); 1968–1983 (South Korea)

Body and chassis
- Class: Large family car (D)
- Layout: Front-engine, rear-wheel drive
- Related: Ford Taunus; Ford Capri

Chronology
- Predecessor: Ford Consul; Ford Consul Corsair (Mark III)
- Successor: Ford Sierra; Ford Telstar; Ford Orion

The Ford Cortina is a medium-sized family car manufactured in various body styles from 1962 to 1982. It was the United Kingdom's best-selling car of the 1970s.

The Cortina was produced in five generations (Mark I through to Mark V, although officially the last one was only a Cortina 80 facelift of the Mk IV) from 1962 until 1982. From 1970 onward, it was almost identical to the German-market Ford Taunus (built on the same platform), which was originally a different car model. This was part of Ford's attempt to unify its European operations. By 1976, when the revised Taunus was launched, the Cortina was identical. The new Taunus/Cortina used the doors and some panels from the 1970 Taunus. It was replaced in 1982 by the Ford Sierra. In Asia and Australasia, it was replaced by the Mazda 626-based Ford Telstar, though Ford New Zealand, which built the sedan until 1983 and the estate car until 1984, did import British-made complete knock-down kits of the Sierra estate for local assembly from 1984. Cortinas were also assembled in South Africa until 1984, with the pick-up version remaining in production in that country until 1987.

The name was inspired by the name of the Italian ski resort Cortina d'Ampezzo, site of the 1956 Winter Olympics. Several Cortinas were driven down the Cortina Olympic bobsled run at that resort, a publicity stunt which Ford called "Cortina Auto-Bobbing."

== Mark I (1962–1966) ==
Cortina Mark I
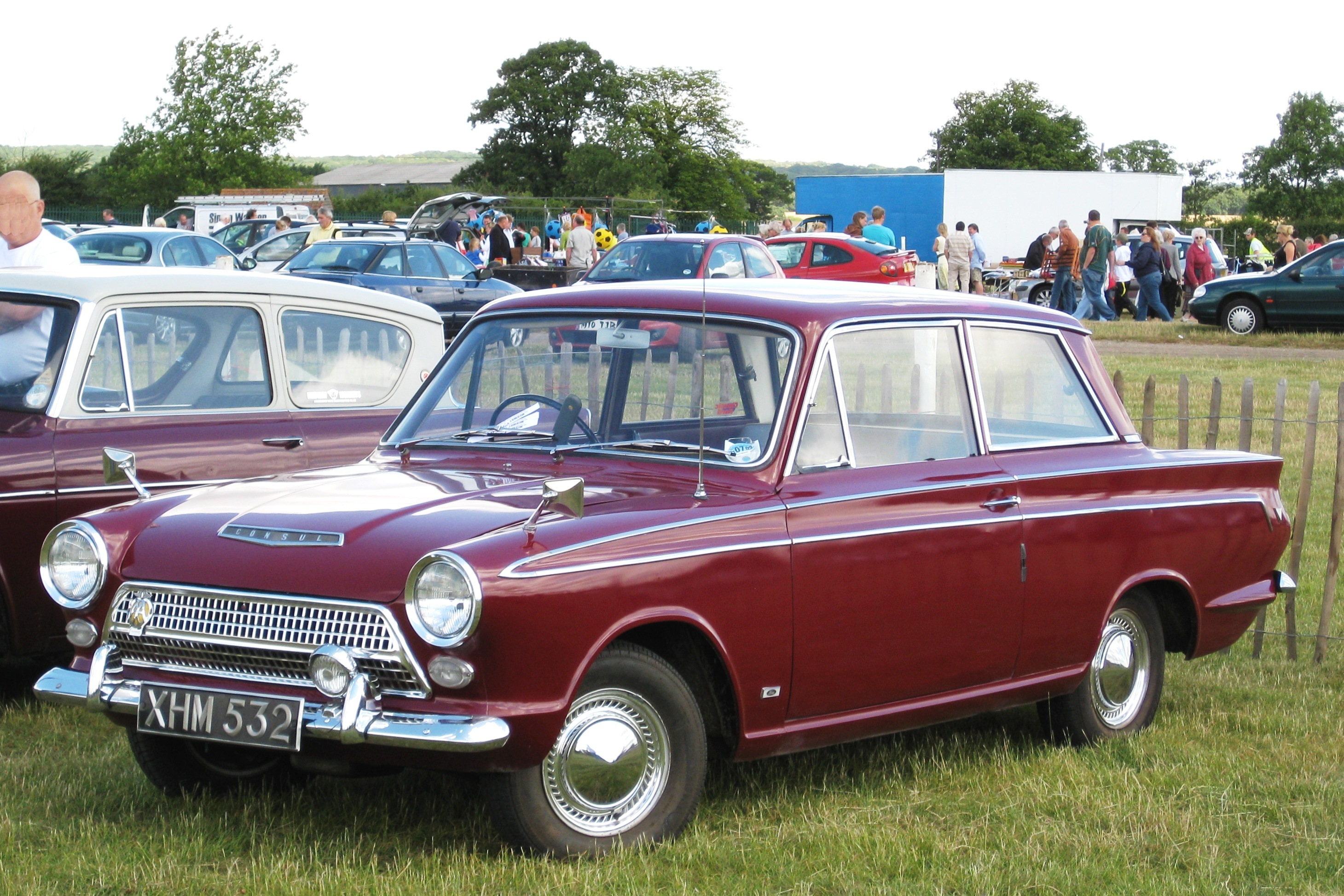
- 1963 Ford Consul Cortina Mk I Super two-door saloon

Overview
- Production: 1962–1966
- Assembly: United Kingdom: Dagenham (Ford Dagenham); Australia: Broadmeadows (Ford Australia); Netherlands: Amsterdam; New Zealand: Lower Hutt (Ford New Zealand); Rhodesia: Salisbury (FMCR); Singapore: Bukit Timah
- Designer: Roy Brown Jr.

Body and chassis
- Body style: 2/4-door saloon 5-door estate

Powertrain
- Engine: 1.2 L Kent I4; 1.5 L Kent I4; 1.6 L Twin-Cam I4
- Transmission: 4-speed manual 3-speed automatic

Dimensions
- Wheelbase: 98 in (2,489 mm)
- Length: 168.25 in (4,274 mm) (saloon); 168.5 in (4,280 mm) (estate)
- Width: 62.5 in (1,588 mm)
- Height: 56.5 in (1,435 mm) (saloon); 57.75 in (1,467 mm) (estate)
- Kerb weight: 1,736 lb (787 kg) (De Luxe); 2,072 lb (940 kg) (Estate)

Using the project name of "Archbishop", management at Ford of Britain in Dagenham created a family-sized car that they could sell in large numbers. The chief designer was Roy Brown Jr., the designer of the Edsel, who had been banished to Dagenham following the failure of that car. The Cortina, aimed at buyers of the Morris Oxford Farina and Vauxhall Victor, was launched on 20 September 1962.

Also from 1962, it was manufactured at the Ford factory in Lower Hutt, New Zealand.

The car was designed to be economical to buy, cheap to run, and easy and inexpensive to produce in Britain. The front-wheel drive configuration used by Ford of Germany for the new Ford Taunus P4, a similar-sized model, was rejected in favour of traditional rear-wheel drive layout. Originally to be called Ford Consul 225, the car was launched as the Consul Cortina until a modest facelift in 1964, after which it was sold simply as the Cortina.

The Cortina was available with 1200 cc and (from early 1963) 1500 cc four-cylinder engines with all synchromesh gearbox, in two-door and four-door saloon, as well as in five-door estate (from March 1963). The saloon model featured large, round, 'Ban the Bomb' taillight clusters. Standard, Deluxe, Super, and GT trims were offered, but not across all body styles. Early Standard models featured a simple body-coloured front grille, earning it the nickname 'Ironbar'. Since this version cost almost the same as the better-equipped Deluxe, it sold poorly and is now very rare. Options included a heater and bench seat with column gearchange (shifter). Super versions of the estates offered the option of simulated wood side and tailgate trim. In an early example of product placement, many examples of the new Cortina featured as "Glamcabs" in the comedy film Carry On Cabby.

Two main variations of the Mark 1 were produced. The Mark 1a possessed elliptical front side-lights, whereas the Mark 1b had a redesigned front grille incorporating the more rectangular side-light and indicator units. A notable variant was the Ford Cortina Lotus.

The Cortina was launched a few weeks before the London Motor Show of October 1962 with a 1198 cc, three-bearing engine, which was an enlarged version of the 997 cc engine then fitted in the Ford Anglia. A few months later, in January 1963, the Cortina Super was announced with a five-bearing, 1498 cc engine. Versions of the larger engine found their way into subsequent variations, including the Cortina GT, which appeared in spring 1963 with lowered suspension and engine tuned to give a claimed output of 78 bhp (58 kW; 79 PS) ahead of the 60 bhp (45 kW; 61 PS) claimed for the Cortina 1500 Super. The engines used across the Mark I range were of identical design, differing only in displacement and setup. The formula used was a four-cylinder pushrod (overhead valve) design that came to be known as the "pre-crossflow" version, as both inlet and exhaust ports were located on the same side of the head. The most powerful version of this engine (used in the GT Cortina) was 1498 cc (1500) and produced 78 bhp (58 kW). This engine contained a different camshaft profile, a different cylinder-head casting with larger ports, tubular exhaust headers, and a Weber 28/36 DCD twin-choke carburettor made under licence by Ford.

Advertising of the revised version appeared at the London Motor Show in October 1964, it made much of the newly introduced "Aeroflow" through-flow ventilation, evidenced by the extractor vents on the rear pillars. A subsequent test on a warm day involving the four different Cortina models manufactured between 1964 and 1979 determined that the air delivery from the simple eyeball outlets on the 1964 Mark I Cortina was actually greater than that on the Mark II, Mark III, or Mark IV. The dashboard, instruments, and controls were revised, for the second time, having been reworked in October 1963, when round instruments replaced the oblong speedometer with which the car had been launched. Twelve years later, however, the painted steel dashboard, its "knobs scattered all over the place and its heater controls stuck underneath as a very obvious afterthought" on the 1964 Mark I Cortina was felt to have aged much less well than the car's ventilation system. Also in 1964, front disc brakes became standard across the range.

Ford Cortina Lotus was offered only as a two-door saloon in white with a contrasting green side flash down each flank. It had a unique 1558 cc twin-cam engine by Lotus, based on the Cortina's Kent OHV engine. Aluminium was used for some body panels. For a certain time, it also had a unique A-frame rear suspension, but this proved fragile, so the model soon reverted to the standard Cortina semielliptical rear end.

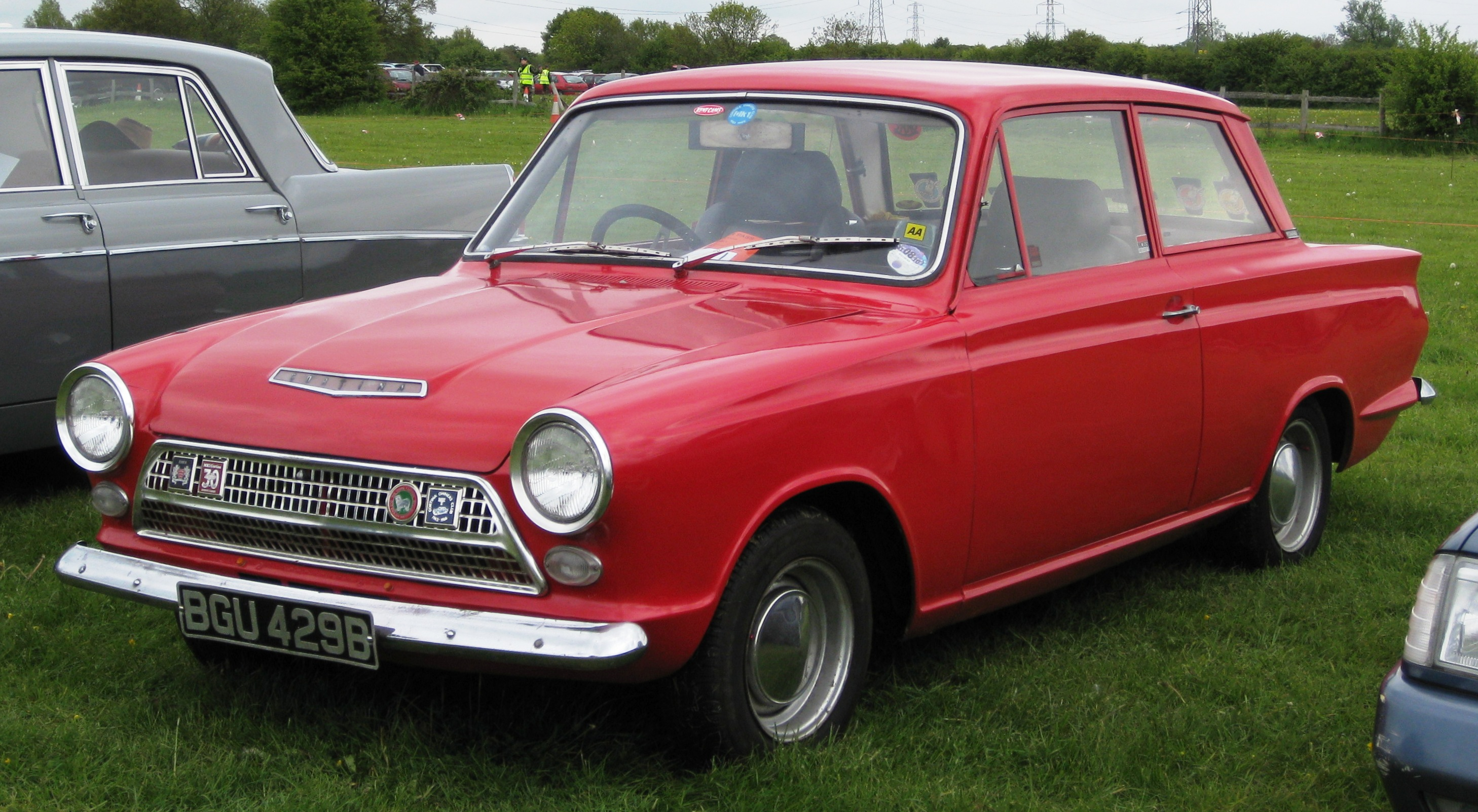
Ford Cortina Mark I two-door saloon (before facelift)

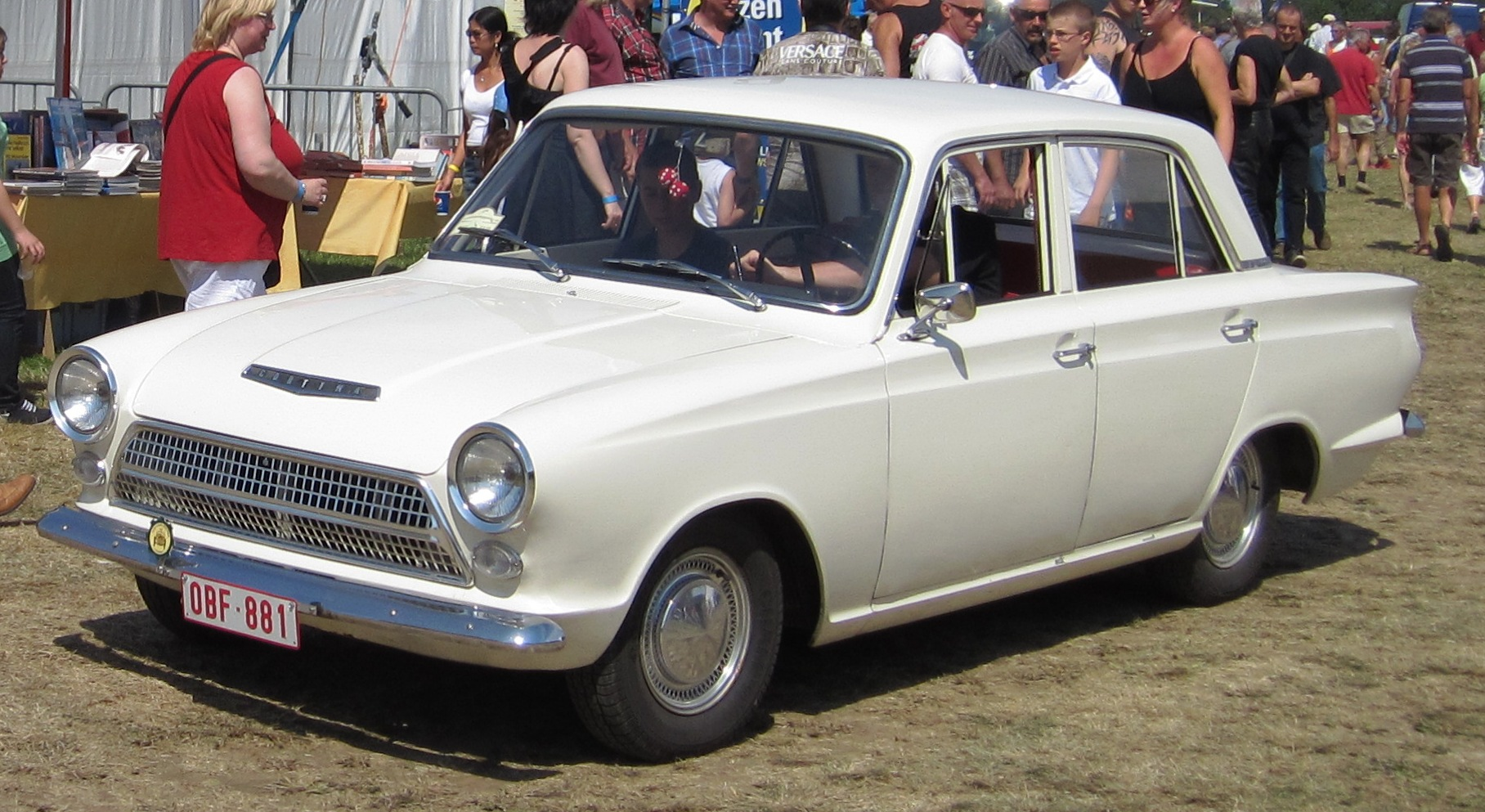
Ford Cortina Mark I four-door saloon (before facelift)

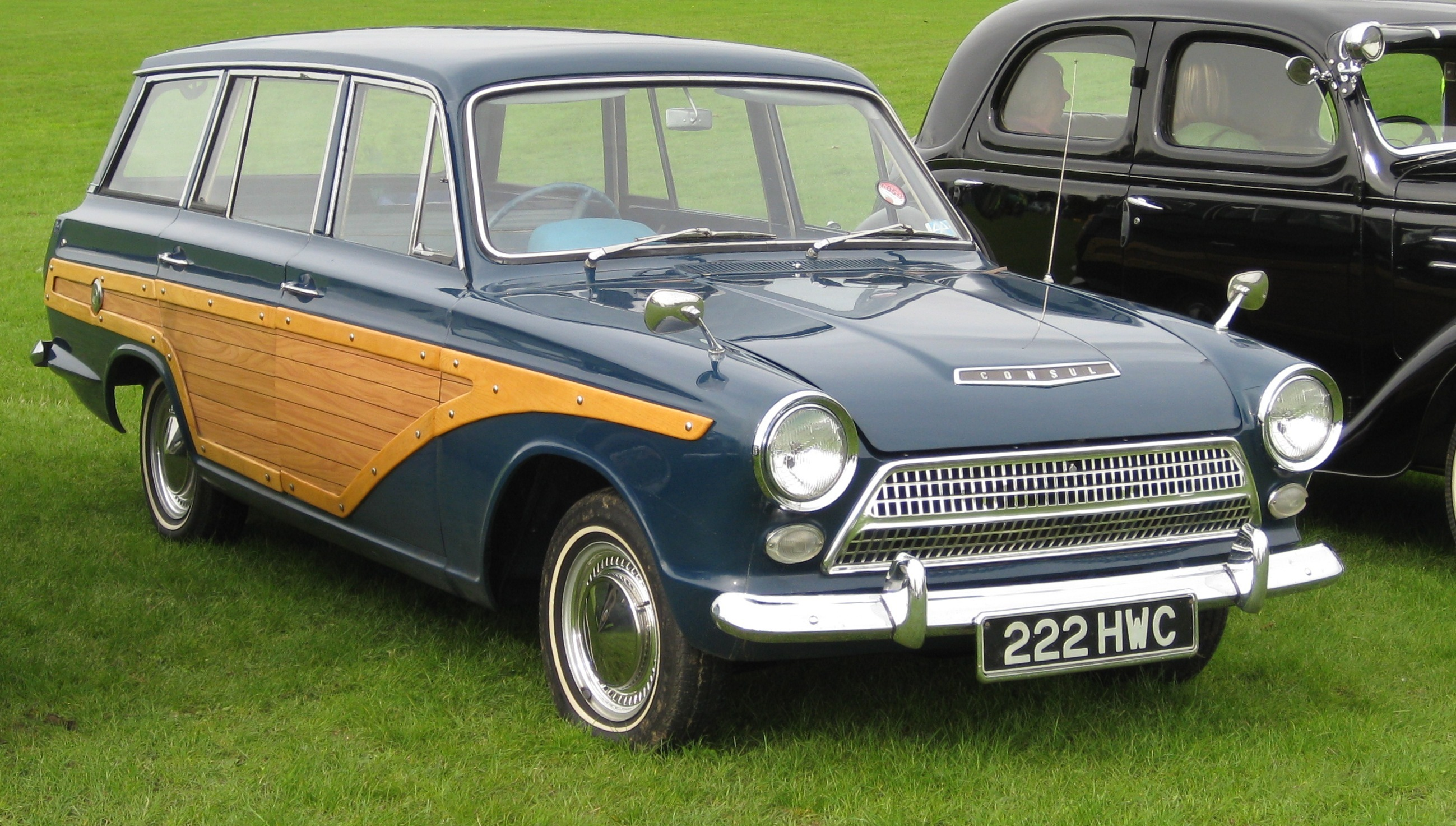
Ford Consul Cortina Mark I estate (before facelift)

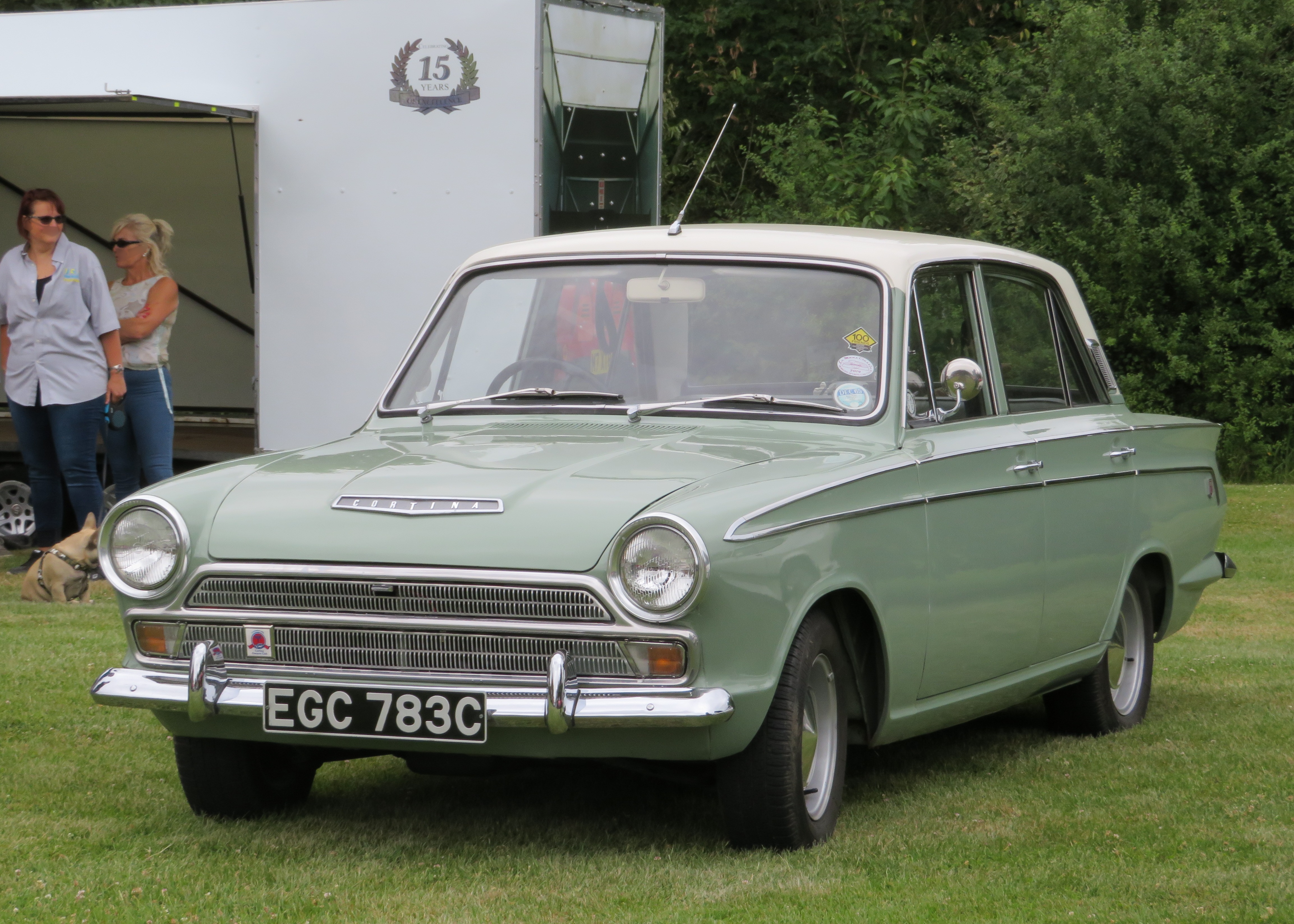
Ford Cortina Mark I four-door saloon (after facelift)

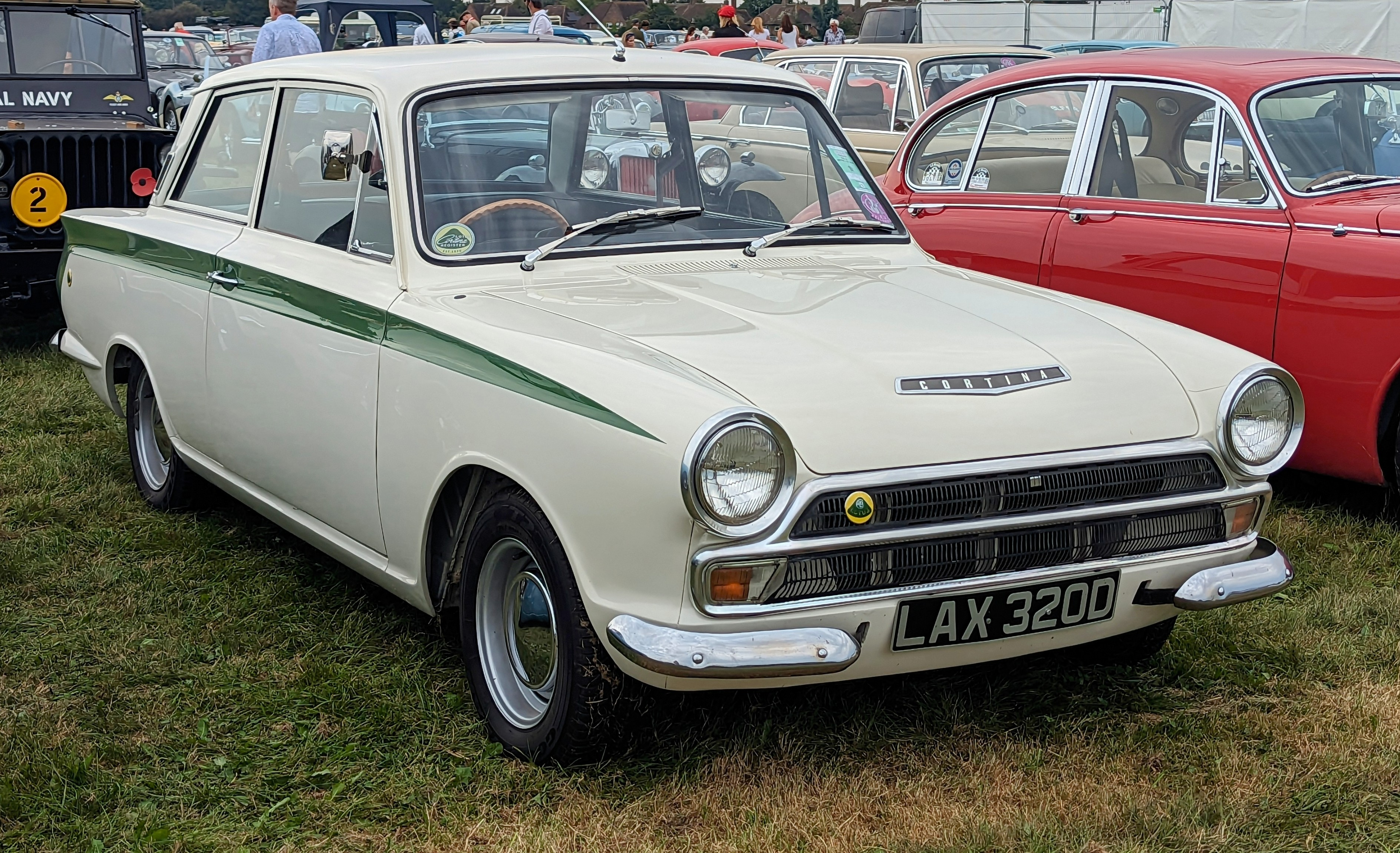
Ford Cortina Lotus Mark I (after facelift)

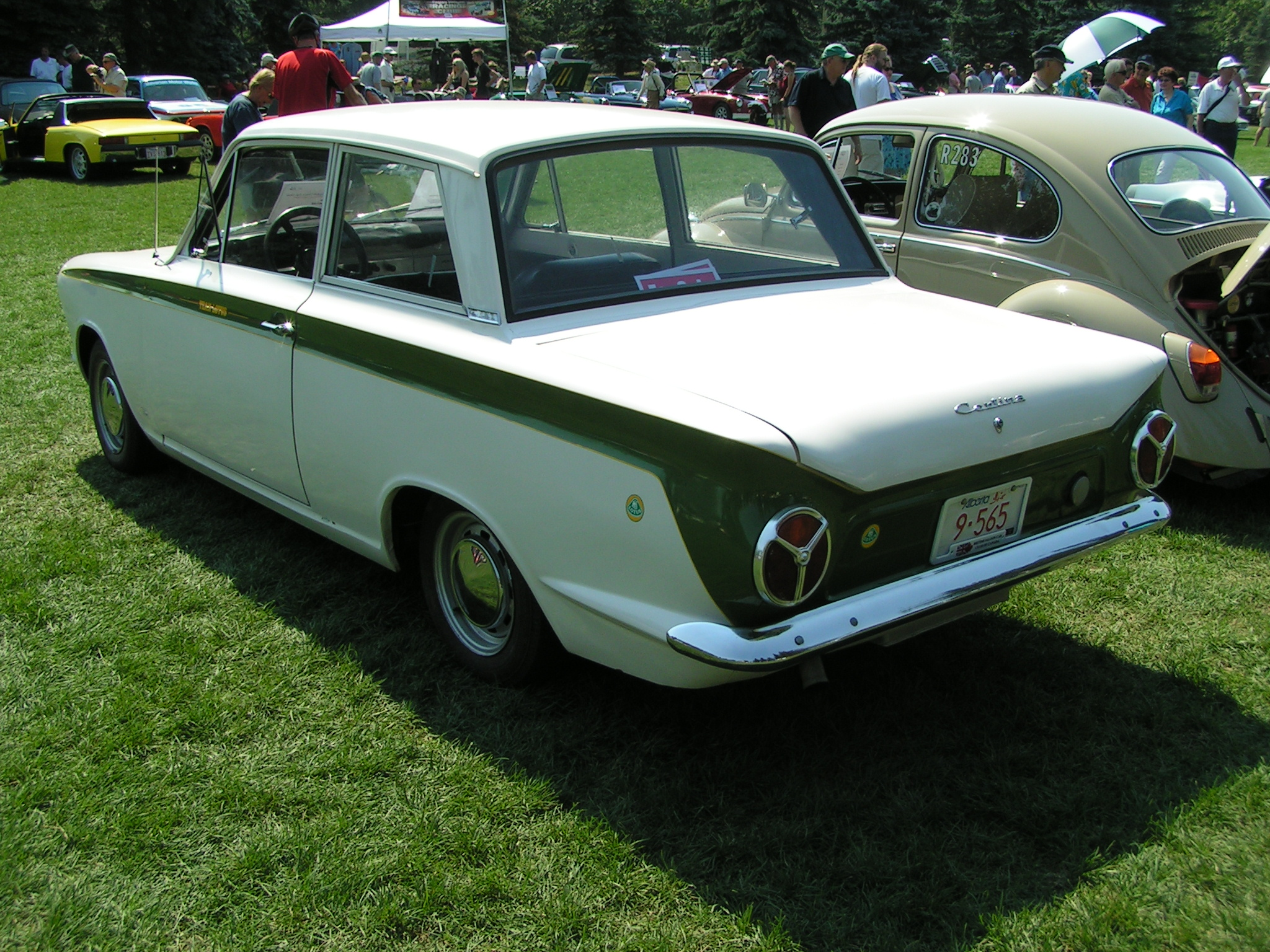
Ford Lotus Cortina rear (before facelift)

== Mark II (1966–1970) ==
Cortina Mark II
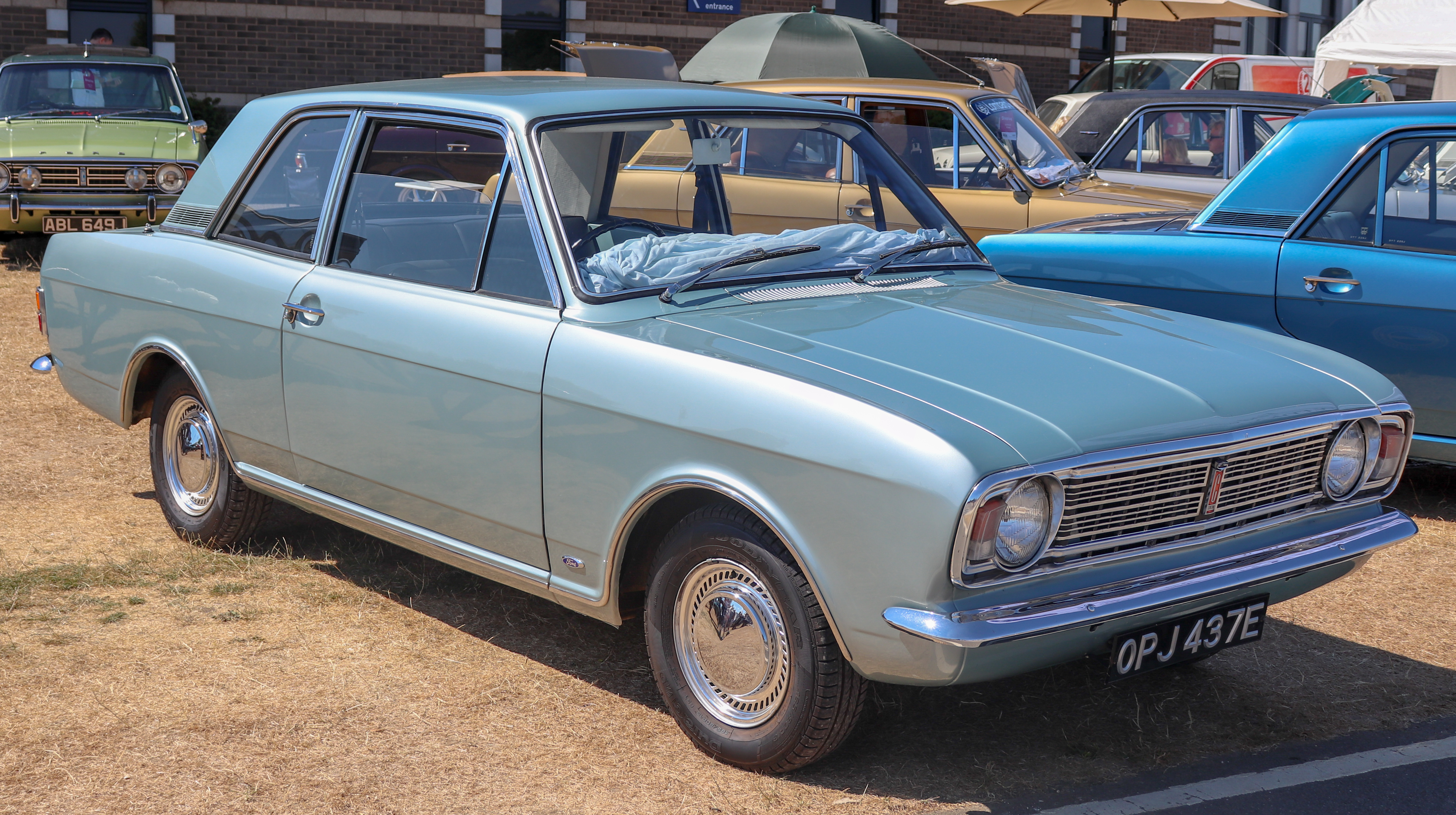
- Ford Cortina Super Mark II two-door saloon

Overview
- Production: 1966–1970; 1968–1971 (South Korea)
- Assembly: United Kingdom: Dagenham (Ford Dagenham); Australia: Broadmeadows (Ford Australia); Ireland: Cork (Cork Plant); Netherlands: Amsterdam; New Zealand: Lower Hutt (Ford New Zealand); South Korea: Ulsan (Hyundai)
- Designer: Roy Haynes

Body and chassis
- Body style: 2-door saloon 4-door saloon 5-door estate
- Related: Ford Capri Mk 1

Powertrain
- Engine: 1.2 L "Kent" I4; 1.3 L "Kent" I4; 1.3 L Crossflow I4; 1.5 L Kent I4; 1.6 L "Crossflow" I4; 1.6 L Twin-Cam I4; 2.5 L Essex V6; 3.0 L Essex V6
- Transmission: 4-speed manual; 3-speed automatic (US)

Dimensions
- Wheelbase: 98 in (2,489 mm)
- Length: 168 in (4,267 mm) (saloon)
- Width: 64.9 in (1,648 mm)
- Height: 55.7 in (1,415 mm)
- Kerb weight: 1,890 lb (857 kg) (De Luxe); 2,032 lb (922 kg) (1600E)

The second incarnation of the Cortina, designed by Roy Haynes, was launched on 18 October 1966, four years after the original Cortina. It had some styling elements in common with the third-generation US Ford Falcon. Although the launch was accompanied by the slogan "New Cortina is more Cortina", the car, at 168 in (4,267 mm) long, was fractionally shorter than before. Its 2 1/2 inches (64 mm) of extra width and curved side panels provided more interior space. Other improvements included a smaller turning circle, softer suspension, self-adjusting brakes and clutch, and the availability, for the UK and some other markets, of a new five-bearing 1300 cc engine.

A stripped-out, 1200 c version running the engine of the Ford Anglia Super was also available for certain markets, where the 1300 cc engine attracted a higher tax rate. The 1500 cc engines were at first carried over, but were discontinued in July 1967, as a new engine was on its way. A month later, in August, the 1300 received a new crossflow cylinder head design, making it more efficient, while a crossflow 1600 replaced the 1500. The new models carried additional "1300" or "1600" designations at the rear. An 1100 cc crossflow engine from the Escort was also offered for markets such as Greece, where higher engine capacities were taxed heavily. The Cortina Lotus continued with its own unique engine, although for this generation it was built in-house by Ford.

The Cortina was Britain's most popular new car in 1967, achieving the goal that Ford had been trying to achieve since it began creating the original Cortina in 1962. This interrupted the long run of BMC's 1100/1300 range as Britain's best-selling car.

Period reviews were favourable concerning both the styling and performance.

Again, two- and four-door saloons were offered with base, Deluxe, Super, GT, and later, 1600E trims available, but again, not across all body styles and engine options. A few months after the introduction of the saloon versions, a four-door estate was launched, released on the UK market on 15 February 1967: much was made at the time of its class-topping load capacity.

The four-door Cortina 1600E, a higher-trim version, was introduced at the Paris Motor Show in October 1967, a year after the arrival of the Cortina Mark II. It combined the lowered suspension of the Cortina Lotus with the high-tune GT 1600 Kent engine and luxury trim featuring a burr walnut woodgrain-trimmed dashboard and door cappings, bucket seating, leather-clad aluminium sports steering wheel, and full instrumentation inside, while a black grille, tail panel, front fog lights, and plated Rostyle wheels on radial tyres featured outside. According to author and Cortina expert Graham Robson, the 1600E would be the first Cortina recognized as a classic.

For 1969, the Mark II range was given subtle revisions, with separate "FORD" block letters mounted on the bonnet and boot lids, a blacked-out grille and chrome strips on top and below the taillights running the full width of the tail panel marking them out.

=== Export markets ===
Ford New Zealand developed its own variant of this model called the GTE, since the GT and Lotus Cortinas were not assembled there. The four-door only GTE had a wooden dash, a vinyl roof, a blacked out tail panel, semi-high back front seats, centre console with floor shifter and clock, Australian Capri full wheel trims plus special stripes and badging.

A 3.0 L Essex V6 engined variant was developed privately in South Africa by Basil Green Motors, and was sold through the Grosvenor Ford network of dealers as the Cortina Perana; two similar models (fitted with 3.0 L and 2.5 L Essex respectively) appeared later in Britain and were known as the Cortina Savage and Cortina Cheetah, which were available with 1600E trim in all three body styles, while their South African stablemate was offered only as a four-door saloon initially with GT and later E trim.

The Cortina was Canada's second-most popular imported car during the 1960s, second only to the Volkswagen Beetle. Canada had two- and four-door sedans, the higher-performance GT sedan, and a DeLuxe wagon. The Lotus Cortina was also available, albeit in limited numbers.

Ford United States imported both the Mark I and Mark II Cortina models. The Mark II was sold in the United States from 1967, achieving 16,193 cars sold in its first year. Sales of the Mark II in 1968 were 22,983. Sales in 1969 reached 21,496. Sales slumped in 1970, to almost half their 1969 peak, at 10,216 units. Ford USA dropped the model in 1970 and was effectively replaced with the introduction of the US-produced 1971 Ford Pinto subcompact. Ford sold 352,402 Ford Pintos for model year 1971 and no more English Fords were sold in the United States thereafter.

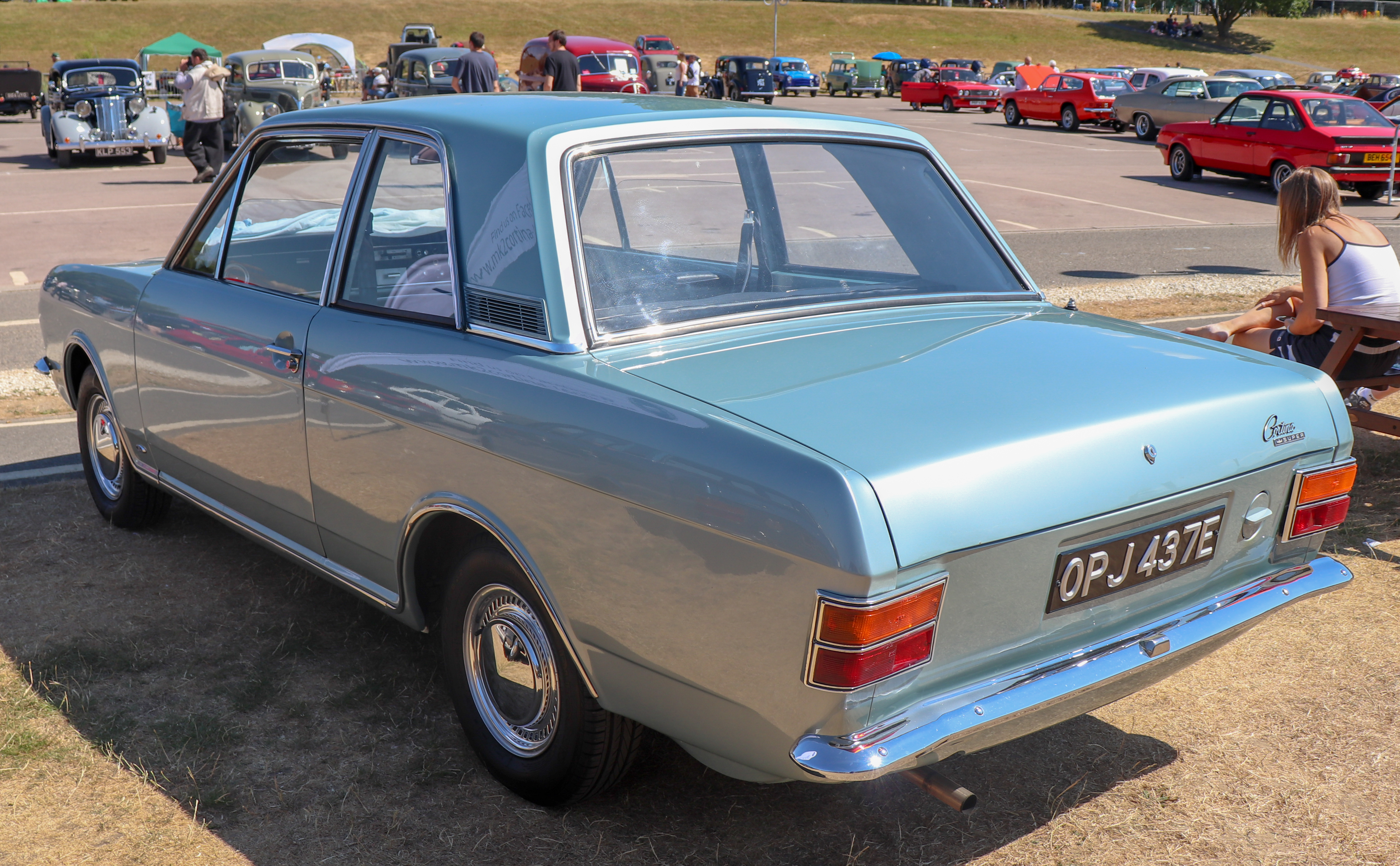
Ford Cortina Mark II two-door saloon

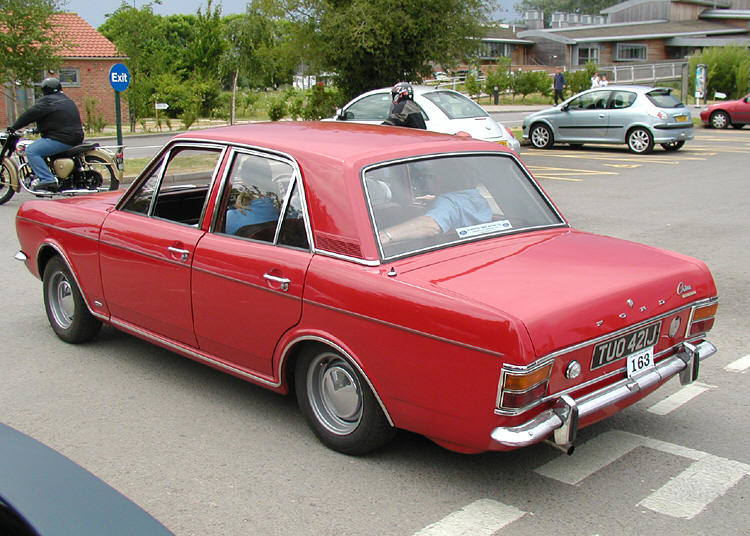
Ford Cortina Mark II four-door saloon

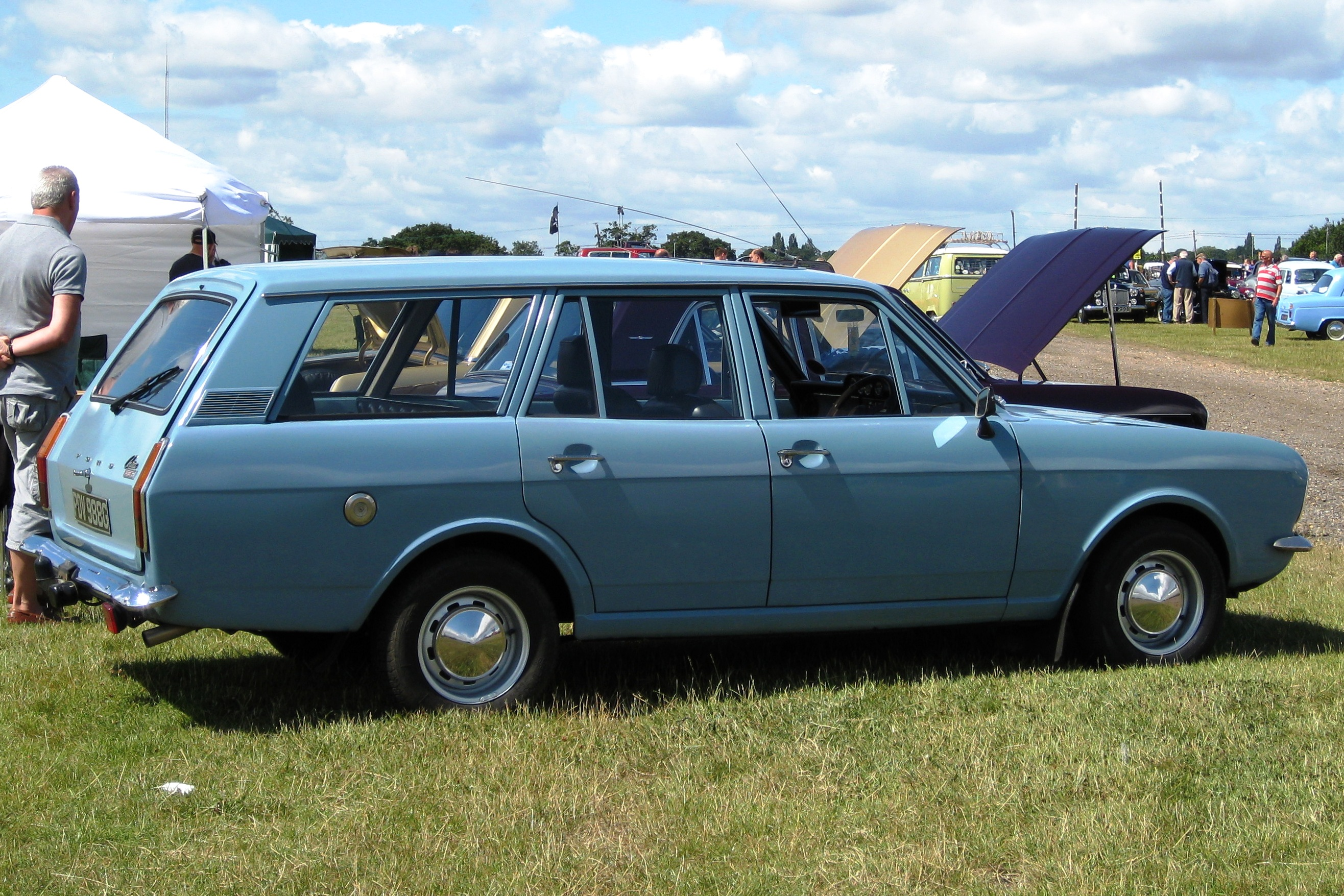
Ford Cortina Mark II Estate

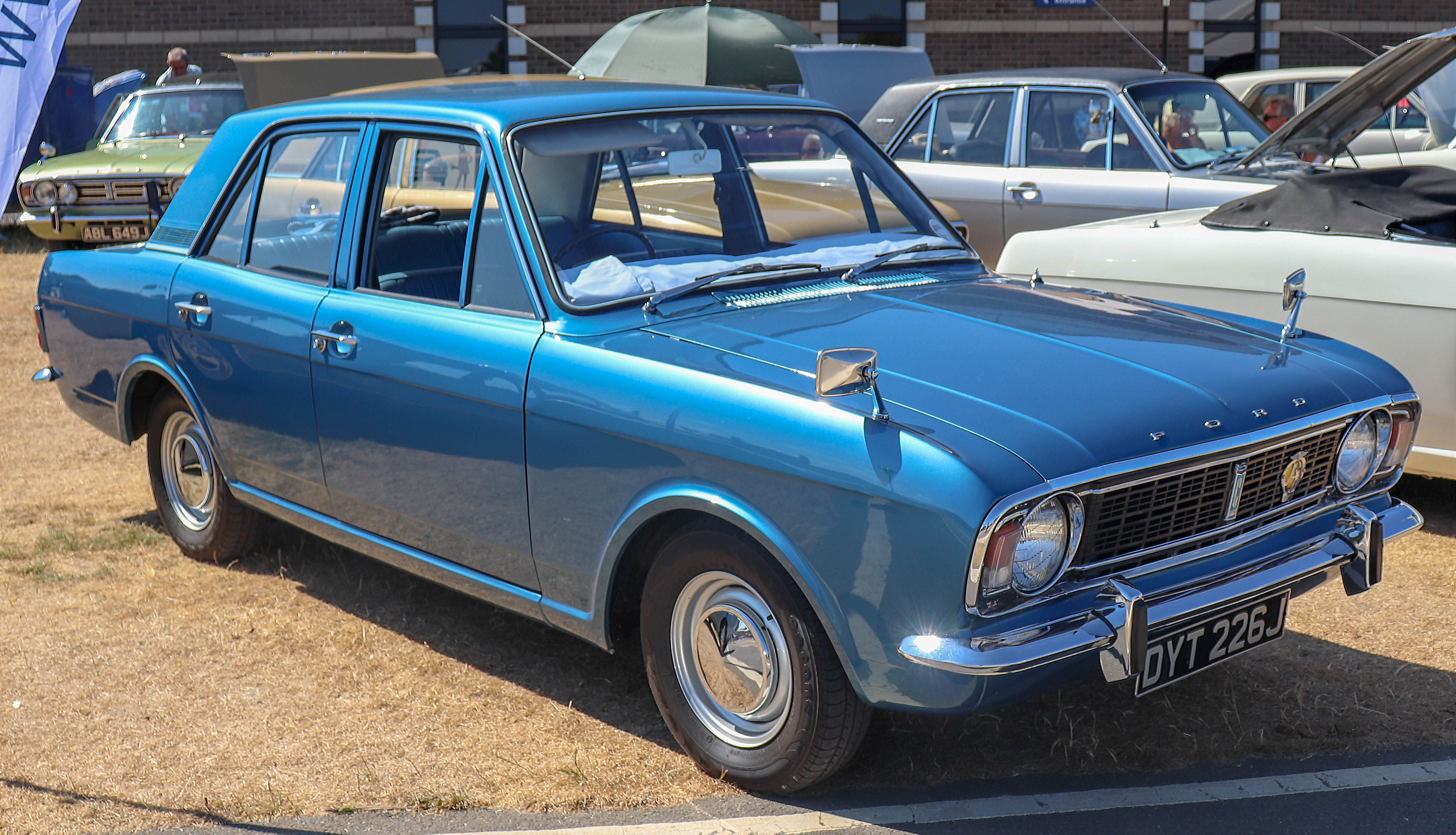
Revised Mark II front, note the blacked-out grille

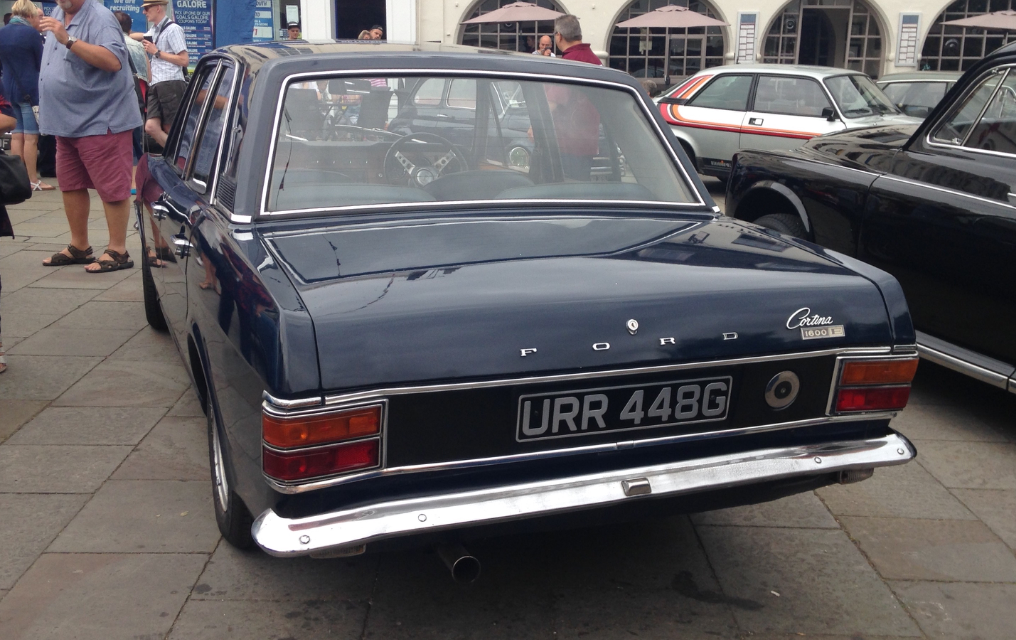
Revised Mark II rear, note the chrome strips around the taillights and separate block letters spelling "FORD"

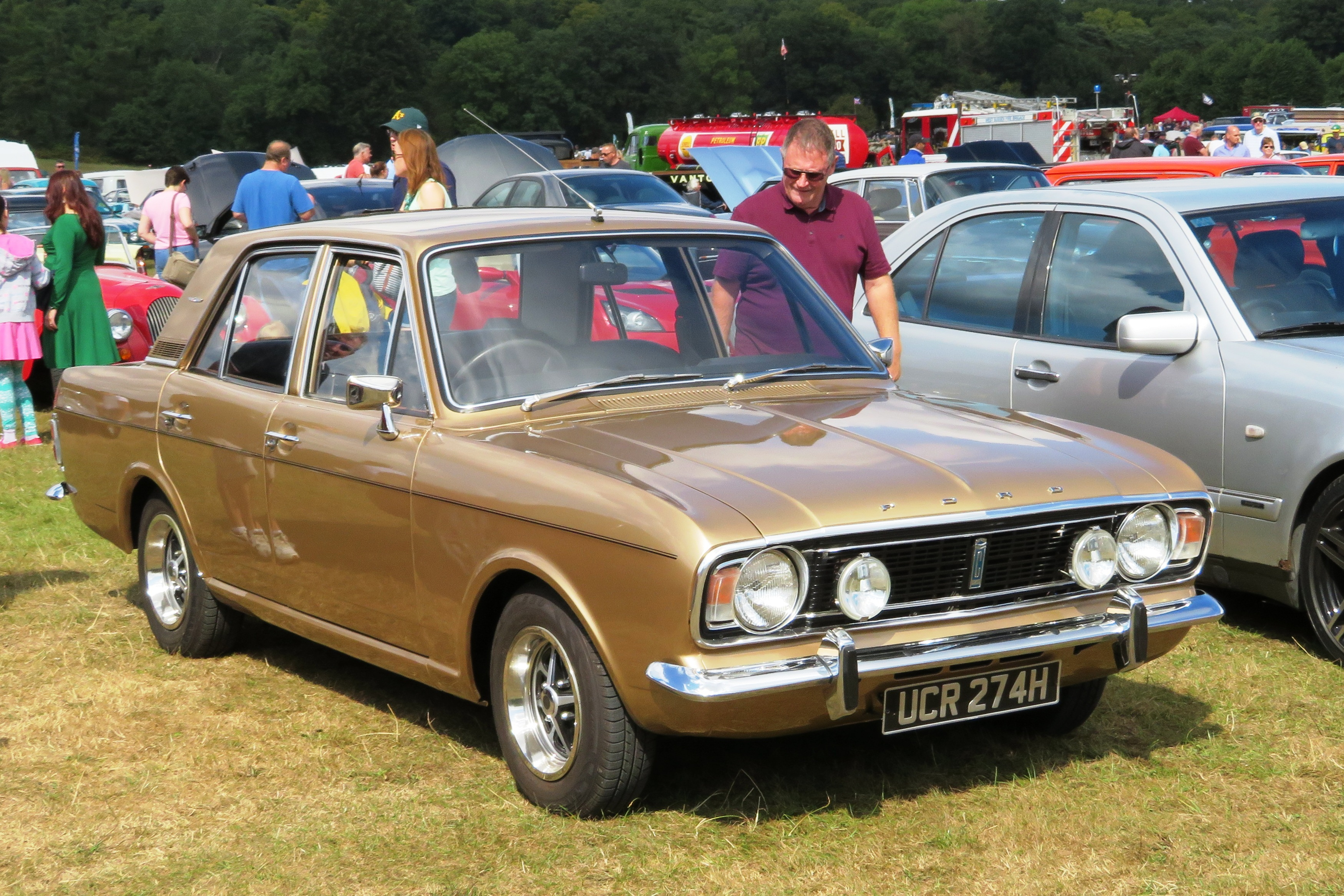
Ford Cortina 1600E Mark II four-door saloon

== TC Mark III (1970–1976) ==
Cortina TC Mark III
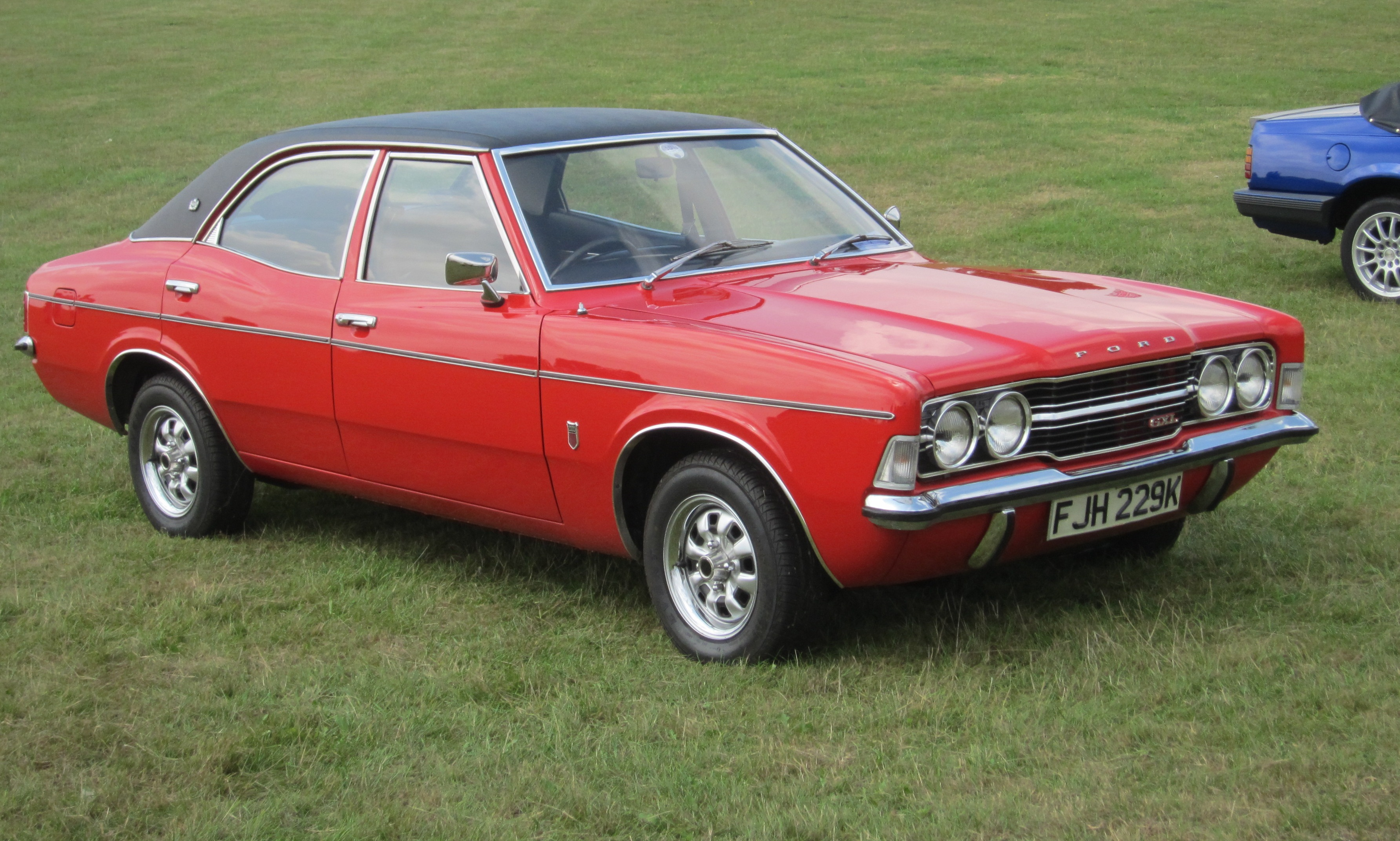
- 1972 Ford Cortina Mk3 GXL four-door.

Overview
- Production: 1970–1976; 1971–1976 (South Korea)
- Assembly: United Kingdom: Dagenham (Ford Dagenham); Australia: Broadmeadows (Ford Australia); Netherlands: Amsterdam (1970–1975); New Zealand: Lower Hutt (Ford New Zealand); South Korea: Ulsan (Hyundai); South Africa: Port Elizabeth (FMCSA); Taiwan: Zhongli City, Taoyuan County (Ford Lio Ho)

Body and chassis
- Body style: 2/4-door saloon 5-door estate 2-door coupé utility (P100)
- Related: Ford Taunus TC

Powertrain
- Engine: 1.3 L Crossflow I4; 1.6 L Crossflow I4; 1.6 L Pinto TL16 I4; 2.0 L Pinto TL20 I4; 2.0 L Essex V4 (South Africa); 2.5 L Essex V6 (South Africa); 3.0 L Essex V6 (South Africa); 3.3 L Falcon 200 I6 (Australia); 4.1 L Falcon 250 I6 (Australia)
- Transmission: 4-speed manual 3-speed automatic

Dimensions
- Wheelbase: 101 in (2,565 mm)
- Length: 167.75 in (4,261 mm) (saloon); 171.5 in (4,356 mm) (estate)
- Width: 67 in (1,702 mm)
- Height: 52 in (1,321 mm)

In the late 1960s, Ford set about developing the third-generation Cortina, the Mark III, which would be produced in higher volumes than before following the merger of Ford of Britain and Ford of Germany into the modern-day Ford of Europe. The car marked the convergence of the German Taunus and British Cortina platforms with only minor differences between the two, hence the car's internal name TC1, standing for Taunus-Cortina. It was also the last European car engineered by Harley Copp as vice president of engineering and head of Brentwood, before he returned to Detroit.

Ford UK originally wanted to call it something other than Cortina, but the name stuck. Although the Mark III looked significantly larger than the boxier Mark II Cortina, it was actually the same overall length, but 4 inches (100 mm) wider. Within the overall length, a wheelbase lengthened by more than 3 inches (76 mm) also contributed to the slightly more spacious interior.

The Mark III Cortina was inspired by the contemporary "coke bottle" design language which had emanated from Detroit – the car sported similar fluted bonnet and beltline design elements to the North American Mercury Montego and Ford LTD of the same era. It replaced both the Mark II Cortina and the larger, more expensive Ford Corsair, offering more trim levels and the option of larger engines than the Mark II Cortina. The Mark III's continental European sister car – the Taunus TC – was subtly different in appearance, with longer front indicators, different taillights, different door skins, different bonnet and boot lid pressings (and hence a different radiator grille), and rear-wing pressings that toned down the drooping beltline, lessening the "coke-bottle" appearance of the Cortina. Also, the dual round headlights fitted to the upmarket version of the Cortina Mark III were not available on the Taunus TC1.

The MacPherson strut front suspension was replaced with more conventional double A-arm suspension (also known as double wishbone suspension), which gave the Mark III a much softer ride on the road, but did give cars fitted with the larger, heavier engines distinct understeer.

Trim levels for the Mark III Cortina were Base, L (Luxury), XL (Xtra Luxury), XLE (Xtra Luxury Edition – Australia and South Africa only), GT (Grand Touring), and GXL (Grand Xtra Luxury).

The early Mark III Cortinas came with the same 1300 and 1600 cc engines as the Mark II Cortinas, except for the 1600 cc GXL and GT. These engines are known as the Kent, crossflow engine or overhead valve (OHV) engine. Also, the 2000 cc engine, the single overhead cam engine, now known as the Pinto engine, was introduced. The OHV Kent' unit was fitted with a single-choke carburetor and was used for the early models up to and including XL trim, the SOHC twin-choke carburetor Pinto engine was used for the GT and GXL models. The GXL was also offered in 1600 in the later Cortina Mark IIIs.

In left-hand drive markets, the 1600 OHC was replaced by a twin-carb OHV (Kent) unit not offered in the home market, to distinguish it from the competing Taunus, which only came with the OHC Pinto engine. The 2.0-litre variants used a larger version of the 1600 cc Pinto unit and were available in all trim levels except base. Base, L, and XL versions were available as a five-door estate.

Although no longer than its predecessor, the Mark III was a heavier car, reflecting a trend towards improving secondary safety by making car bodies more substantial. Weight was also increased by the stout cross-member incorporated into the new simplified front suspension set-up, and by the inclusion of far more sound-deadening material, which insulated the cabin from engine and exhaust noise, making the car usefully quieter than its predecessor, though on many cars, the benefit was diminished by high levels of wind noise apparently resulting from poor door fit around the windows. Four-speed manual transmissions were by now almost universally offered in the UK for this class of car, and contemporary road tests commented on the rather large gap between second and third gear, and the resulting temptation to slip the clutch when accelerating through the gears in the smaller-engined cars: it was presumably in tacit acknowledgment of the car's marginal power-to-weight ratio that Ford no longer offered the automatic transmission option with the smallest 1298 cc-engined Cortina.

Four headlights marked out the pre facelift GT and GXL versions. Early GT and GXL had Rostyle steel sports wheels similar to those fitted to the Mk2 Cortina 1600E. These were replaced by a 8 'spoke' look steel sports wheel at the end of 1971 for the 1972 model year. The GXL also had bodyside rub strips, a vinyl roof covering, and a brushed aluminium and black boot lid panel on the GXLs, while the GT had a black-painted section of the boot with a chrome trim at either side of it. A vinyl roof could be added as a cost option to both 2 and 4 door models. All prefacelift models featured a downward-sloping dashboard with deeply recessed dials, with the GT and GXL having 4 deep recessed gauges in the centre console measuring oil pressure, oil and water temperature and volts, along with 'tombstone' one piece high back seats with integral headrests. All cars from introduction had coil suspension all round. In general styling and technical make up, the Mark III Cortina aped the Vauxhall Victor FD of 1967.

The Cortina went on sale on 23 October 1970, but sales got off to a particularly slow start because of production difficulties that culminated with a 10-week strike at Ford's plant between April and June 1971, which was at the time reported to have cost production of 100,000 vehicles, equivalent to almost a quarter of the output for a full year.

During 1971, the spring rates and damper settings were altered along with the front suspension bushings, which reduced the bounciness of the ride and low-speed ride harshness, which had generated press criticism at the time of the Mark III's launch.

Volumes recovered, and with the ageing Austin/Morris 1100/1300 now losing out to various newer models, the Cortina was Britain's top-selling car in 1972, closely followed by the Escort. It remained the UK's top-selling car until 1976, when overtaken by the Mk2 Escort.

In late 1973, the Mark III was given a facelift, and was redesignated TD. The biggest change was the new dashboard, which dispensed with the steeply sloped and somewhat "overstyled" original. The new fascia was much flatter in appearance featuring the instruments under a glass hood with improved ergonomics which would be carried over to the later Mark IV and Mark V Cortinas with only detail modifications, as well as upgraded trim levels, revised front grilles and rear lights, rectangular headlights for the XL, GT, and the new 2000E (the "E" standing for executive), which replaced the GXL. The 1.3-litre Kent engine continued, but 1.6-litre models now used the more modern 1.6-litre Pinto SOHC engine. While the TD Cortina still had double A-arm suspension with coils at the front and a four-link system at the rear, handling was improved. The 2000E reverted to the classy treatment offered by the MkII 1600E (and carried over to later Mark IV/V Ghia) models instead of the faux woodgrain trim of the GXL. The 2000E was also available as an estate version.

=== Export markets ===
The Mark III was sold in Canada until 1973.

For South Africa, the Mark III was available as the 'Big Six' L and GL with the Essex V6 2.5-litre engine and Perana, GT, and XLE with the Essex V6 3.0-litre engine. A pick-up truck version also was available. In addition to the 1.6-litre inline-four, a version unique to South Africa was a locally built version of the 2.0-litre Essex V4. The Cortina 2000 V4 arrived during 1972, and also became available as a station wagon and pick-up later in the year. Maximum power was 76.6 kW SAE (104 PS; 103 hp). The shorter engine required a radiator shroud to compensate. The Cortina GT, however, received an OHC inline-four in South Africa, as well.

Ford Australia built its own versions using both the UK four-cylinder engines (1.6 and 2.0) and locally made inline six-cylinder engines (3.3- and 4.1-litre) from its Falcon line. Along with the engines, Australian built Cortinas featured many paint colours carried over from the Falcon line, some even from the Falcon GT.

Ford New Zealand introduced the Mk3 as a four-door sedan and also reintroduced a wagon version, which had not been assembled during the Mk2's run. Initially, the 1.3 OHV engine came with base trim, the 1.6 as the Cortina L, and the 2.0 OHC as a GT (sedan only). Later base models were upgraded to the 1.6 OHV and a 2.0 L specification was added, set to become the default "rep's spec" until the Cortina's Kiwi demise in 1984. A 1973 update brought new paint colours and black, rather than colour-matched, dashboards and carpet. Facelifted Mk3s received the 1.6 OHC replacement for the base 1.6 engine and during the run, a specially trimmed base 1.3 OHV "economy" version was reintroduced, but actually achieved worse fuel economy than larger engine models. A 2.0XL sedan version was also added around the same time. The Kiwi 2000E sedan initially lacked the cloth seats and never had the factory sunroof of the UK version and a radio was never standard, wagons were only ever offered in base or L trim.

Ford Lio Ho in Taiwan began local production of the Cortina in March 1973.

For Japan, the cars were narrowed by a few millimetres on arrival in the country to fit into a lower tax bracket determined by exterior dimensions which impose a maximum width of 1,695 mm (66.7 in). The Cortina was joined by the Ford Capri in Japan and was imported by Kintetsu Motors, an exclusive retailer of Ford products.

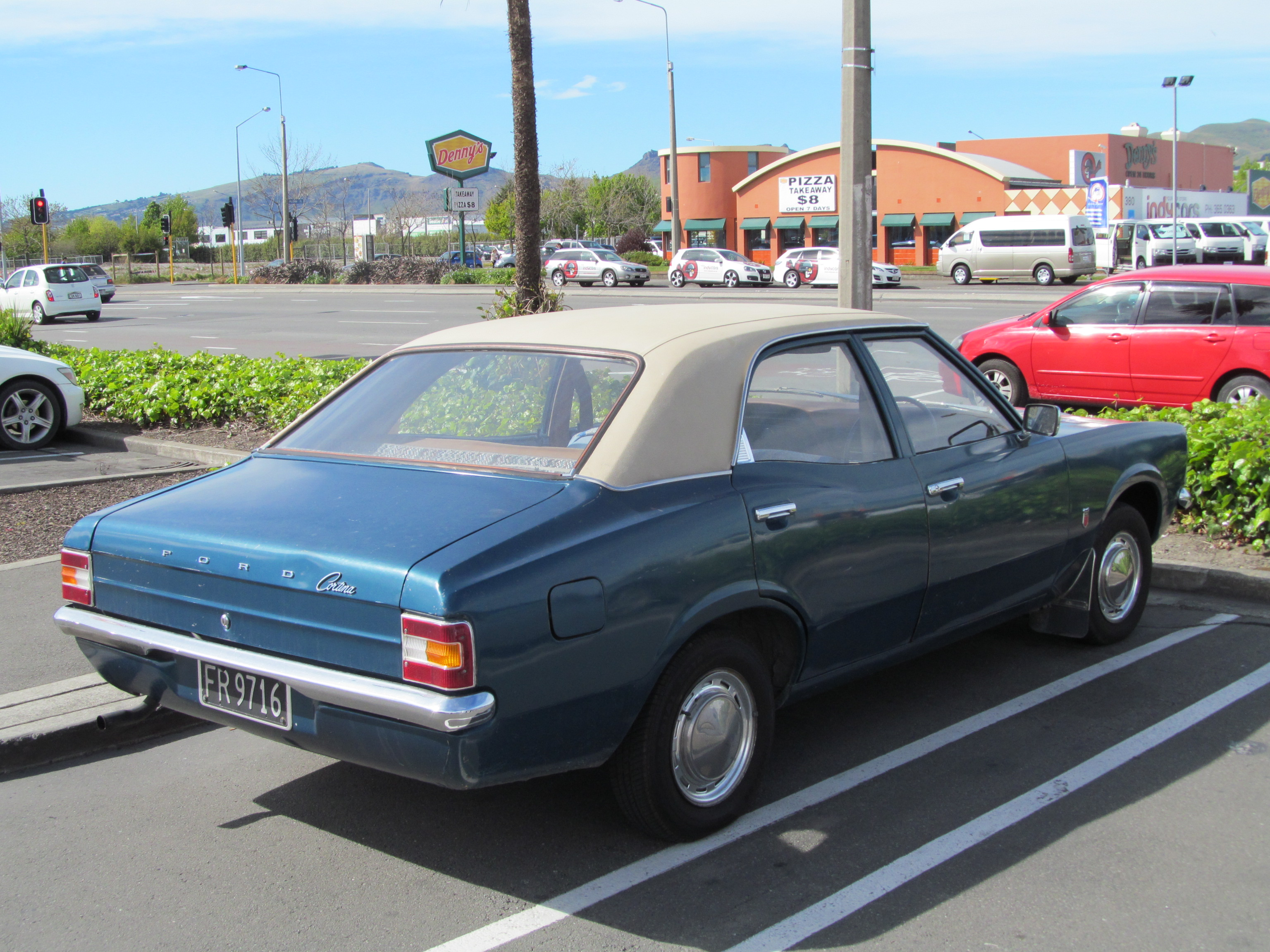
Four-door saloon

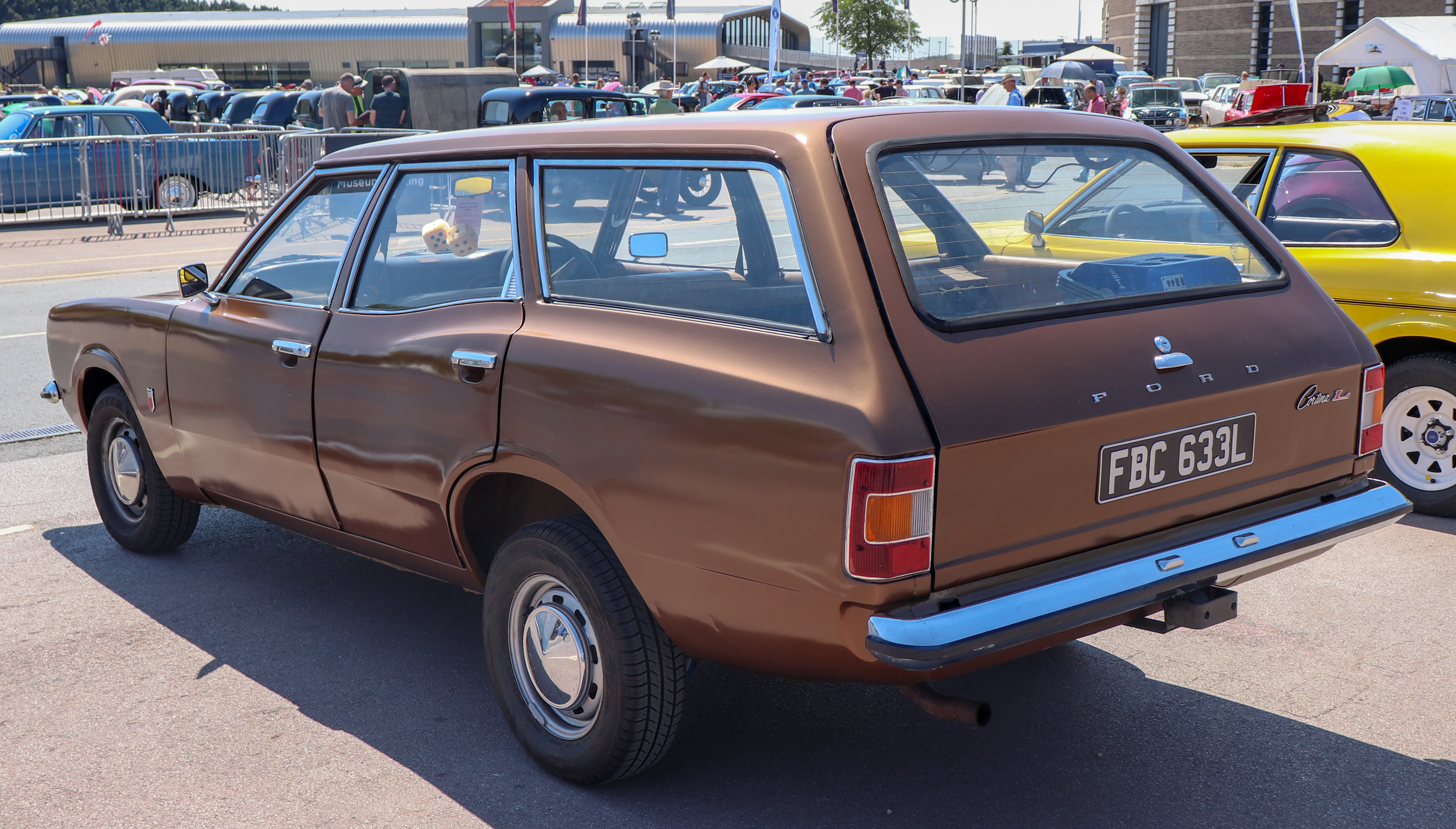
Estate

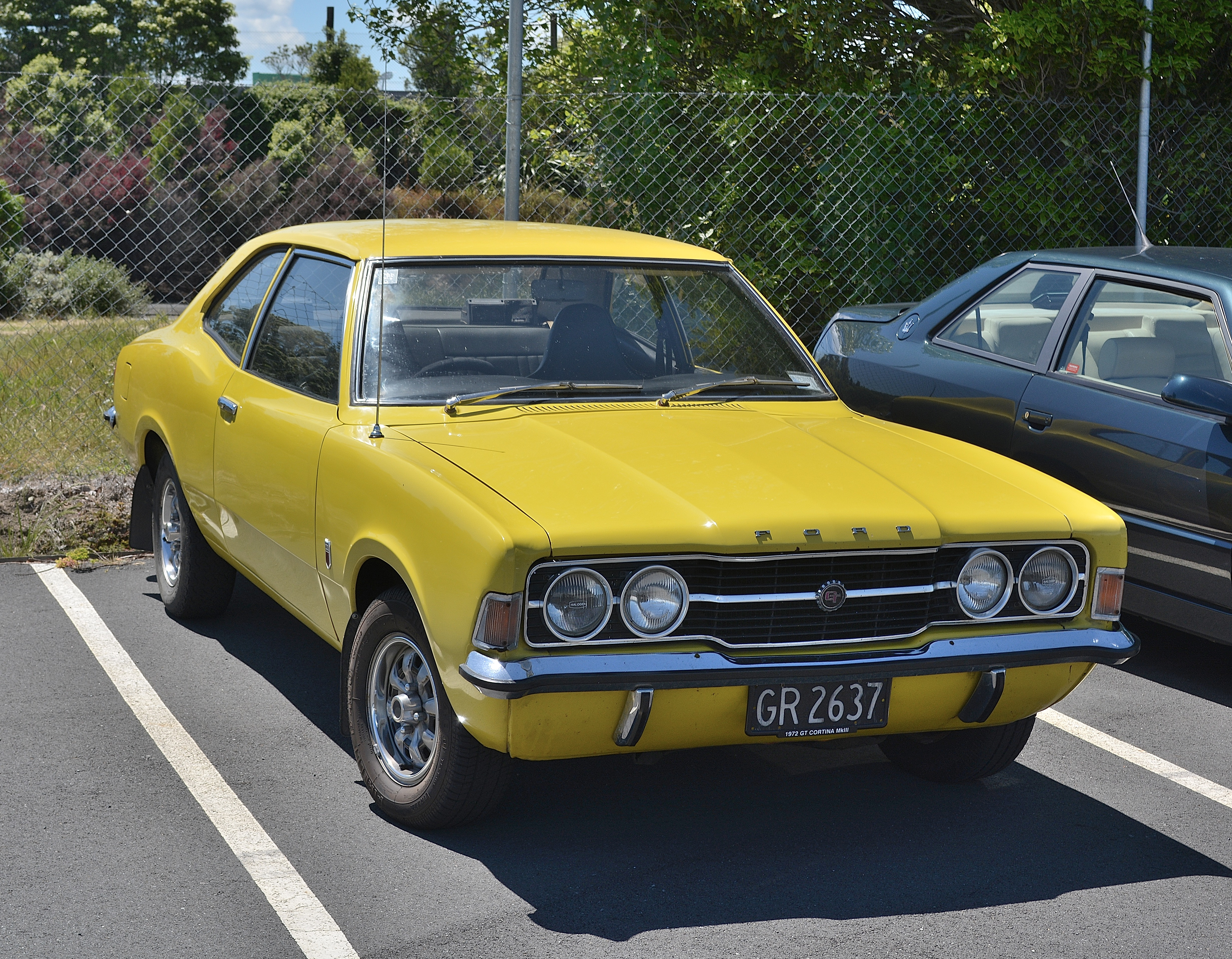
Two-door saloon

== Mark IV (1976–1979) ==
Cortina Mark IV
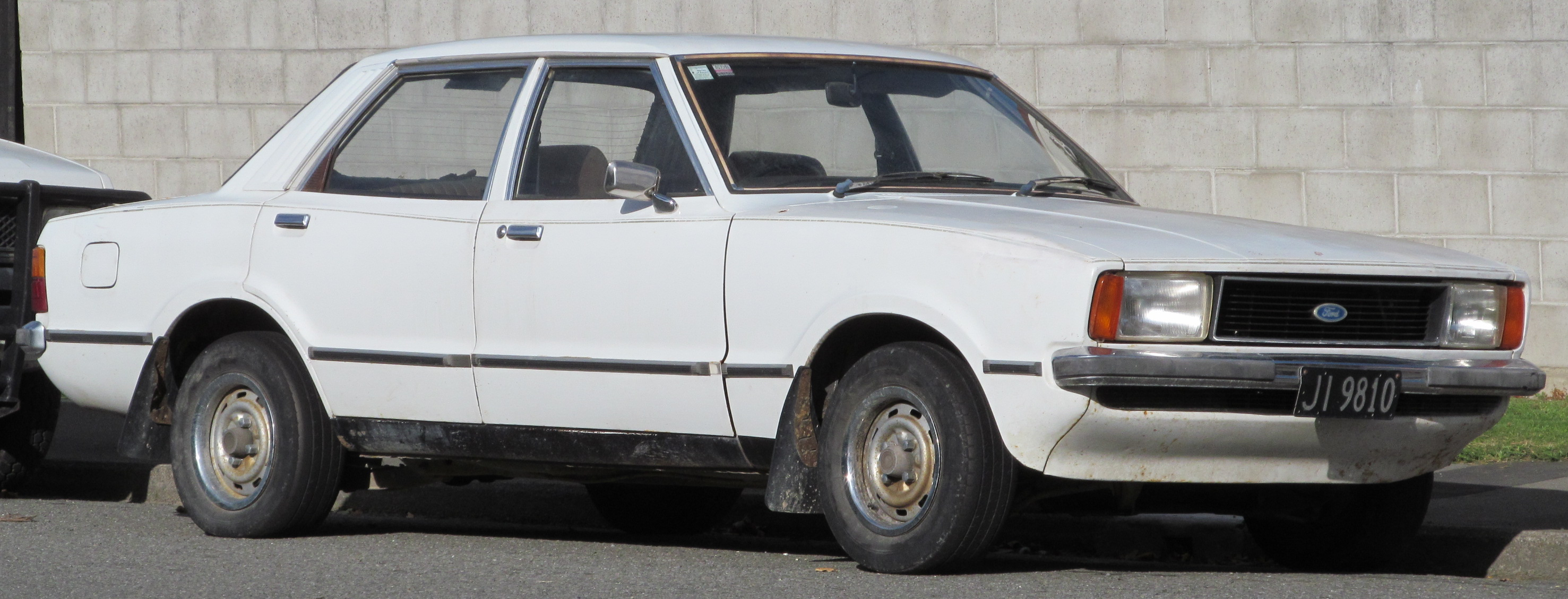
- Ford Cortina Mk IV saloon

Overview
- Production: 1976–1979; 1976–1980 (South Korea)
- Assembly: United Kingdom: Dagenham (Ford Dagenham); Australia: Broadmeadows (Ford Australia); New Zealand: Lower Hutt (Ford New Zealand); South Korea: Ulsan (Hyundai); South Africa: Port Elizabeth (FMCSA); Taiwan: Zhongli City, Taoyuan County (Ford Lio Ho)
- Designer: Uwe Bahnsen

Body and chassis
- Body style: 2/4-door saloon; 5-door estate; 2-door coupé utility (P100)
- Related: Ford Taunus TC2

Powertrain
- Engine: 1.3 L Crossflow I4; 1.4 L Mitsubishi 4G33 I4 (Cortina Economy); 1.6 L Crossflow I4; 1.6 L Pinto TL16 I4; 2.0 L Pinto TL20 I4; 2.0 L Cologne V6; 2.3 L Cologne V6; 3.0 L Essex V6; 3.3 L Falcon 200 I6; 4.1 L Falcon 250 I6
- Transmission: 4-speed manual 3-speed automatic

Dimensions
- Wheelbase: 101.5 in (2,578 mm)
- Length: 170.9 in (4,341 mm) (saloon); 174.8 in (4,440 mm) (estate)
- Width: 66.9 in (1,699 mm)
- Height: 53.8 in (1,367 mm)

The Mark IV Cortina (or TC2, as it was the second generation of the unified Taunus-Cortina platform) was a more conservative design than its predecessor, and this was largely appreciated by fleet buyers. Generally, it was a rebody of the Mark III/TC with little mechanical change as an integration of Ford's model range, and as a result, the Cortina and Taunus now differed only in badging. Although the updated Taunus was introduced to Continental Europe in January 1976, Ford were able to continue selling the Cortina Mark III in undiminished numbers in the UK until they were ready to launch its successor as the Dagenham-built Cortina Mark IV, which went on sale on 29 September 1976.

Many parts were carried over, most notably the running gear. The raised driving position and the new dashboard had, along with some of the suspension upgrades, had already appeared in the 1974 model year Cortina MkIII, so that from the driving position, the new car looked much more familiar to owners of recent existing Cortinas than from the outside. Cinema audiences saw the new Cortina (or Taunus) chasing James Bond in his Lotus Esprit in the 1977 film The Spy Who Loved Me.

The most obvious change was the new, squarer body in line with contemporary "folded paper" fashion of the time – although it still featured a subtle 'Coke-bottle' waistline as a reference to its predecessor – along with a lowered boot lid height which achieved the marketing department objective of larger windows giving a better view out and a brighter feel to the cabin, but at the expense of body weight, which was increased, albeit only marginally, by about 30 lb (14 kg). Ford claimed an overall increase in window area of some 15%, with "40% better visibility" through the wider, deeper back window. Regardless of how these figures were computed, substantial weight-saving gains must have been made through reduced steel usage in the design, given the unavoidable extra weight of glass.

This series spawned the first Ghia top-of-the-range model, which replaced the 2000E. The 2.3-litre Ford Cologne V6 engine was introduced in 1977 as an engine above the 2.0-litre Pinto engine, already a staple of the Capri and Granada ranges. However, 2.3-litre Cortinas never sold particularly well in the UK. The Cologne V6 was much smoother and delivered more refined power than the Pinto, but the V6 models were more expensive to fuel and insure, and were only slightly faster, being about 0.5 seconds faster from 0–60 and having a top speed of about 109 mph compared to the 104 mph of the 2.0-litre models. The 2.0-litre Cologne V6 engine continued to be offered on Taunus-badged cars in parallel with the Pinto unit, and offers here an interesting comparison with the similarly sized in-line four-cylinder Pinto engine. The V6 with a lower compression ratio offered less power and less performance, needing over an extra second to reach 50 mph (80 km/h). It did, however, consume 12½% less fuel and was considered by motor journalists to be a far quieter and smoother unit. The 2.3-litre was available to the GL, S, and Ghia variants. A 1.6-litre Ghia option was also introduced at the same time as the 2.3-litre V6 models in response to private and fleet buyers who wanted Ghia refinements with the improved fuel economy of the smaller 1.6-litre Pinto engine. Few cars were sold with the 1.6-litre engine, though; the 2.0-litre Pinto was always by far the most common engine option for Ghia models.

Two-door and four-door saloons and a five-door estate were offered with all other engines being carried over. At launch, though, only 1.3-litre-engined cars could be ordered in the UK with the two-door body, and then only with "standard" or "L" equipment packages. In practice, relatively few two-door Mark IV Cortinas were sold. In some markets, the two-door saloon was marketed as a coupe, but this was not the case in Britain. Ford already competed in the coupe sector in Europe with the Capri, which was particularly successful on the British market.

A choice of base, L, GL, S (for Sport) and Ghia trims was available, again not universal to all engines and body styles. 8 'spoke' steel sports wheels were fitted as standard to all Mark IV GL, S, and Ghia models, with alloy wheels available as an extra-cost option for the Ghia. The dashboard was carried over intact from the last of the Mark III Cortinas, while the estate used the rear body pressings of the previous 1970-release Taunus.

Despite its status as Britain's best-selling car throughout its production run, the Mark IV is now the rarest Cortina, with poor rustproofing and the model's popularity with banger racers cited as being the main reasons for its demise. Particularly scarce are the 2.0 and 2.3 S models, which were discontinued when the Mark V was introduced in August 1979.

Ford Australia built its own version, known as the TE, with the 2.0-litre straight-four engine Pinto unit and the Falcon's 3.3-litre and 4.1-litre straight-six engine. The six-cylinder versions were rather nose heavy and did not handle as well as the fours or the European V6 models. Interior door hardware and steering columns were shared with the Falcons, and the Australian versions also had their own instrument clusters, optional air conditioning, and much larger bumpers. They also had side indicators. The Cortina wagon was assembled by Renault Australia at its plant in Heidelberg in Victoria.

A considerable number were exported to New Zealand under a free-trade agreement where they were sold alongside locally assembled models similar to those available in the UK.

In South Africa, the Mark IV was built with the Kent 1.6-litre and the 3.0-litre Essex V6. Beginning in mid-1978, the Cologne-built 2.0-litre Pinto four also became available in place of the old Essex V4. They were sold as L (1600), GL (2000), and Ghia (V6) with four-door saloon or estate bodywork.

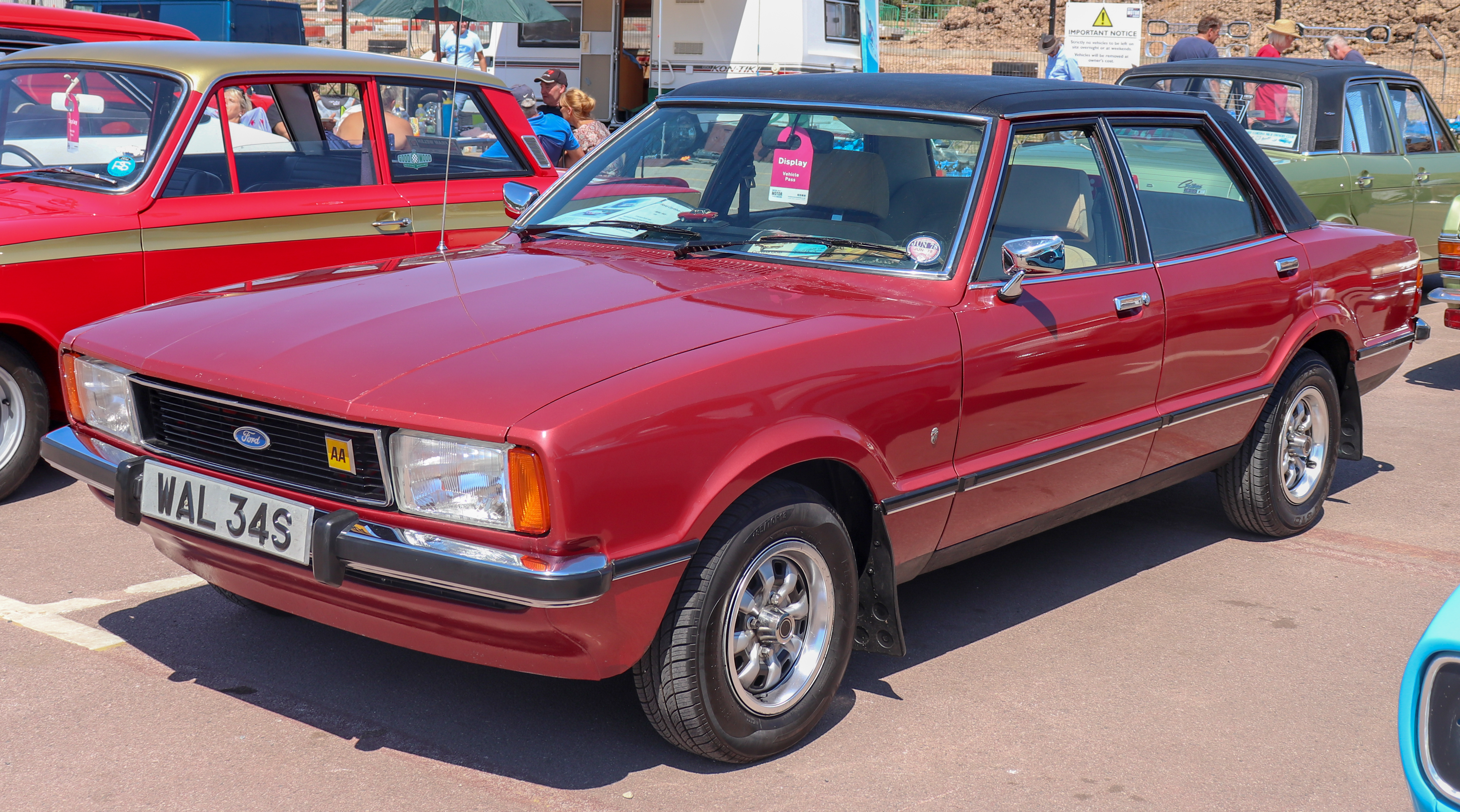
A 1978 Ford Cortina Ghia four-door saloon

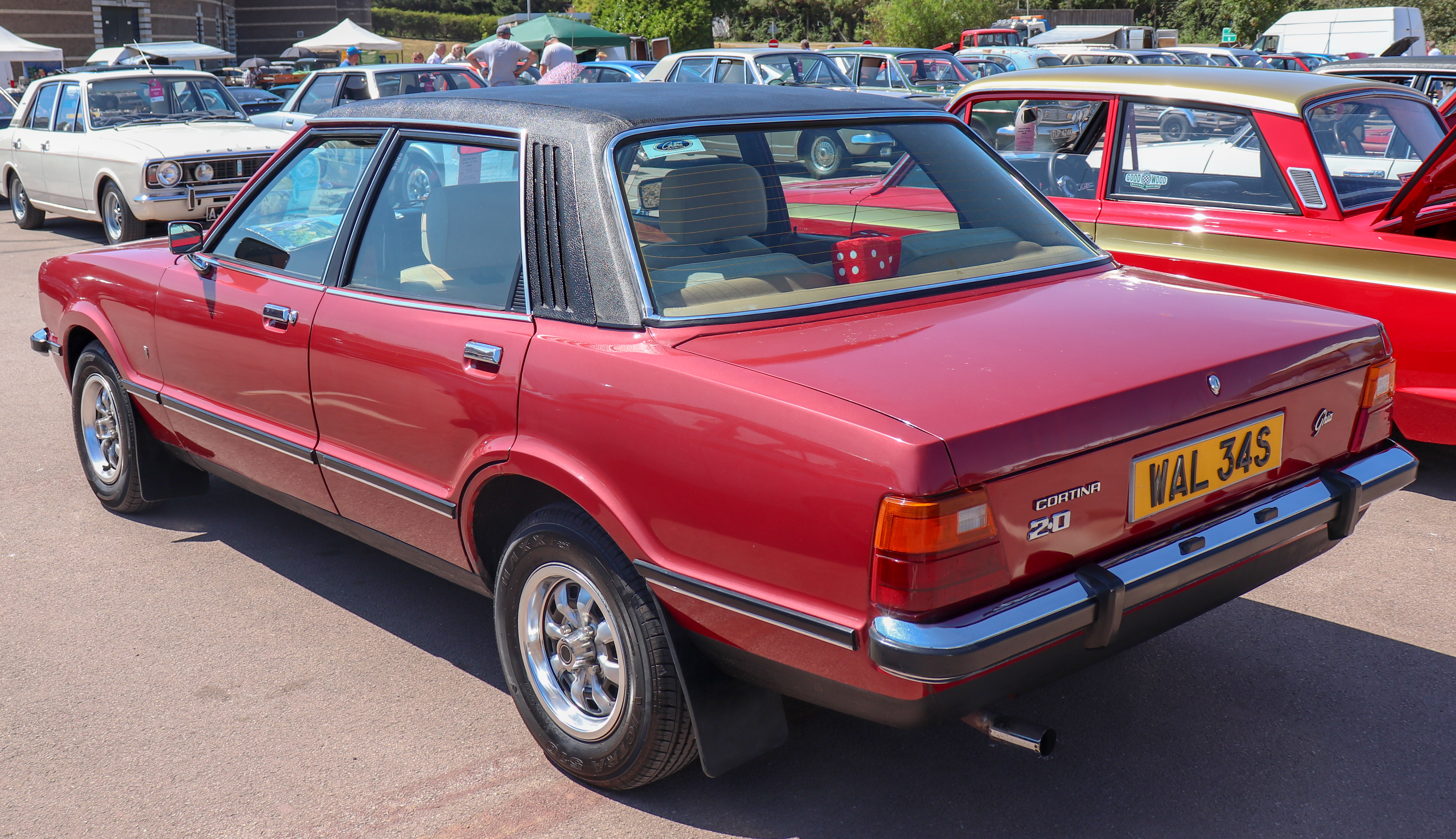
1978 Ford Cortina Ghia four-door saloon

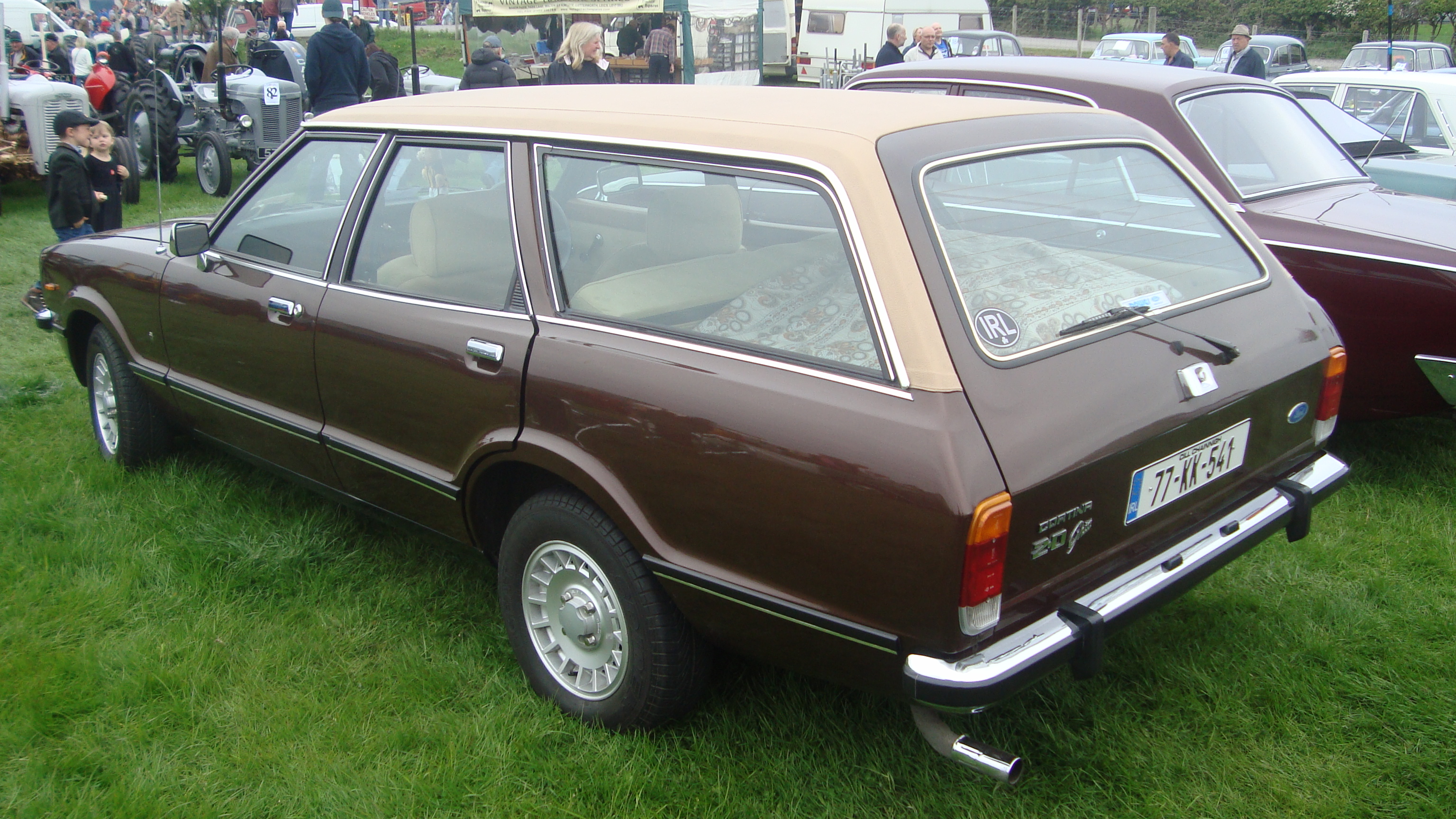
Mark IV Estate

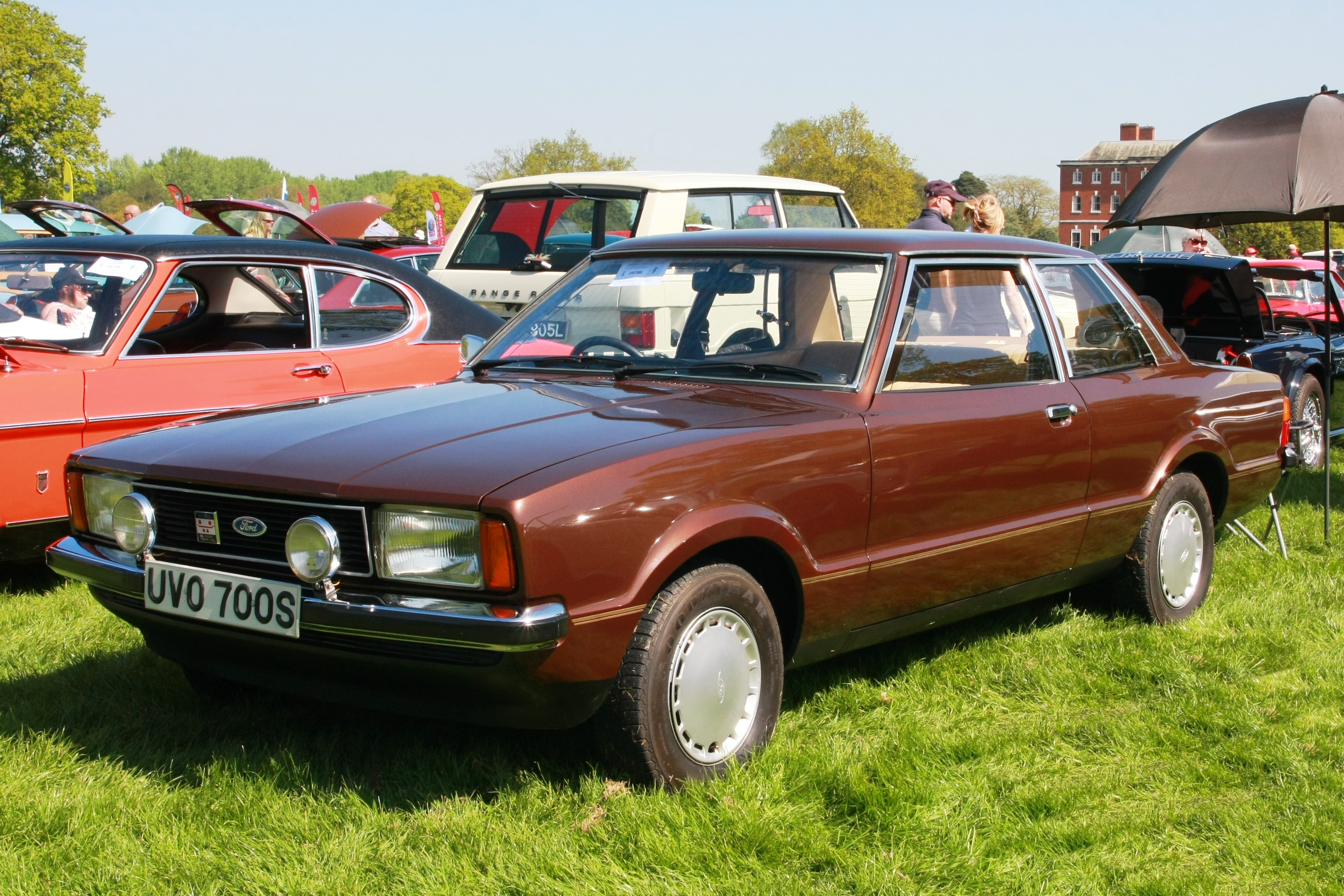
Ford Cortina L two-door saloon

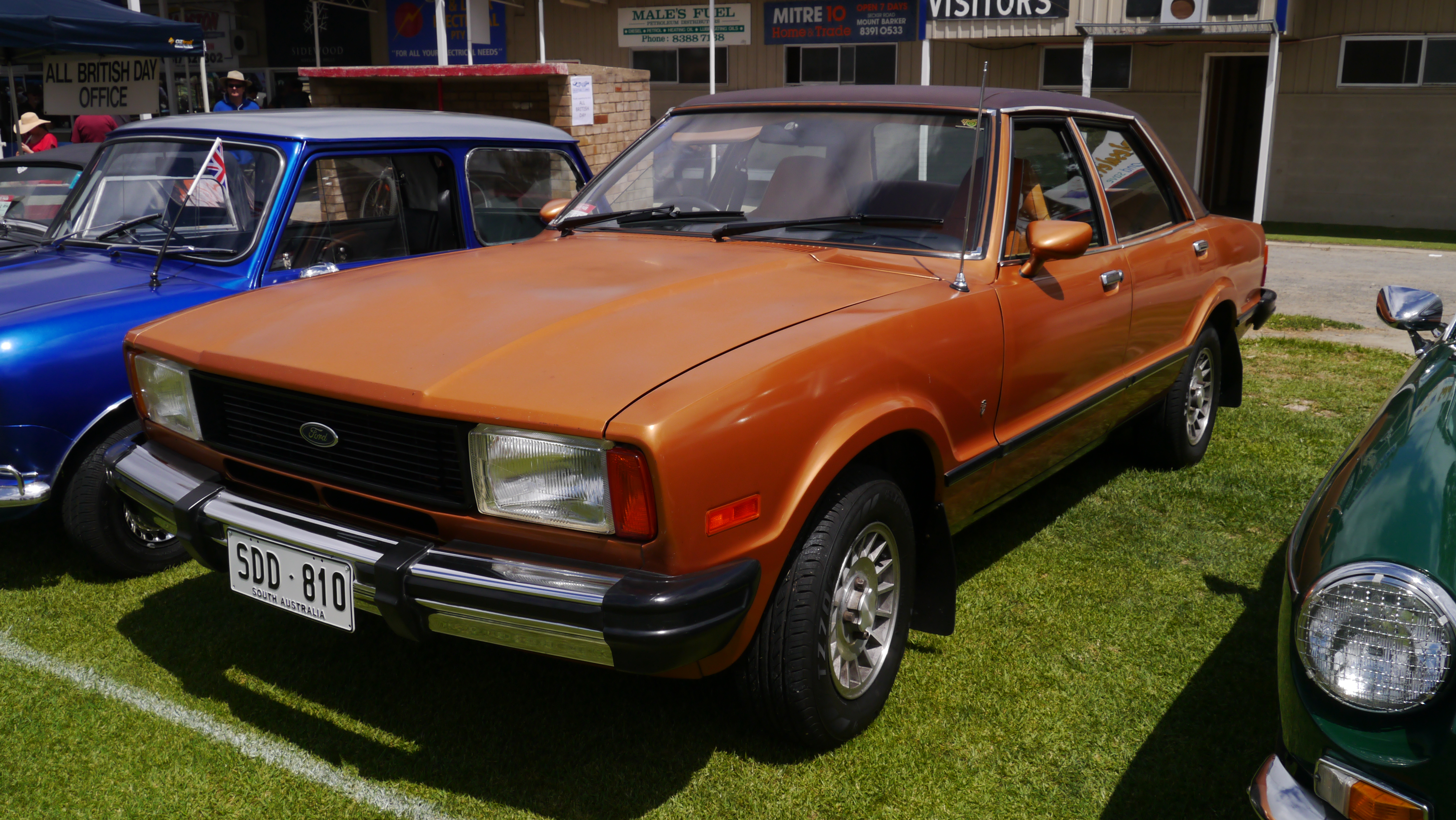
1978 Ford Cortina 4 Ghia sedan (TE; Australia)

== Mark V (1979–1982) ==
Cortina Mark V
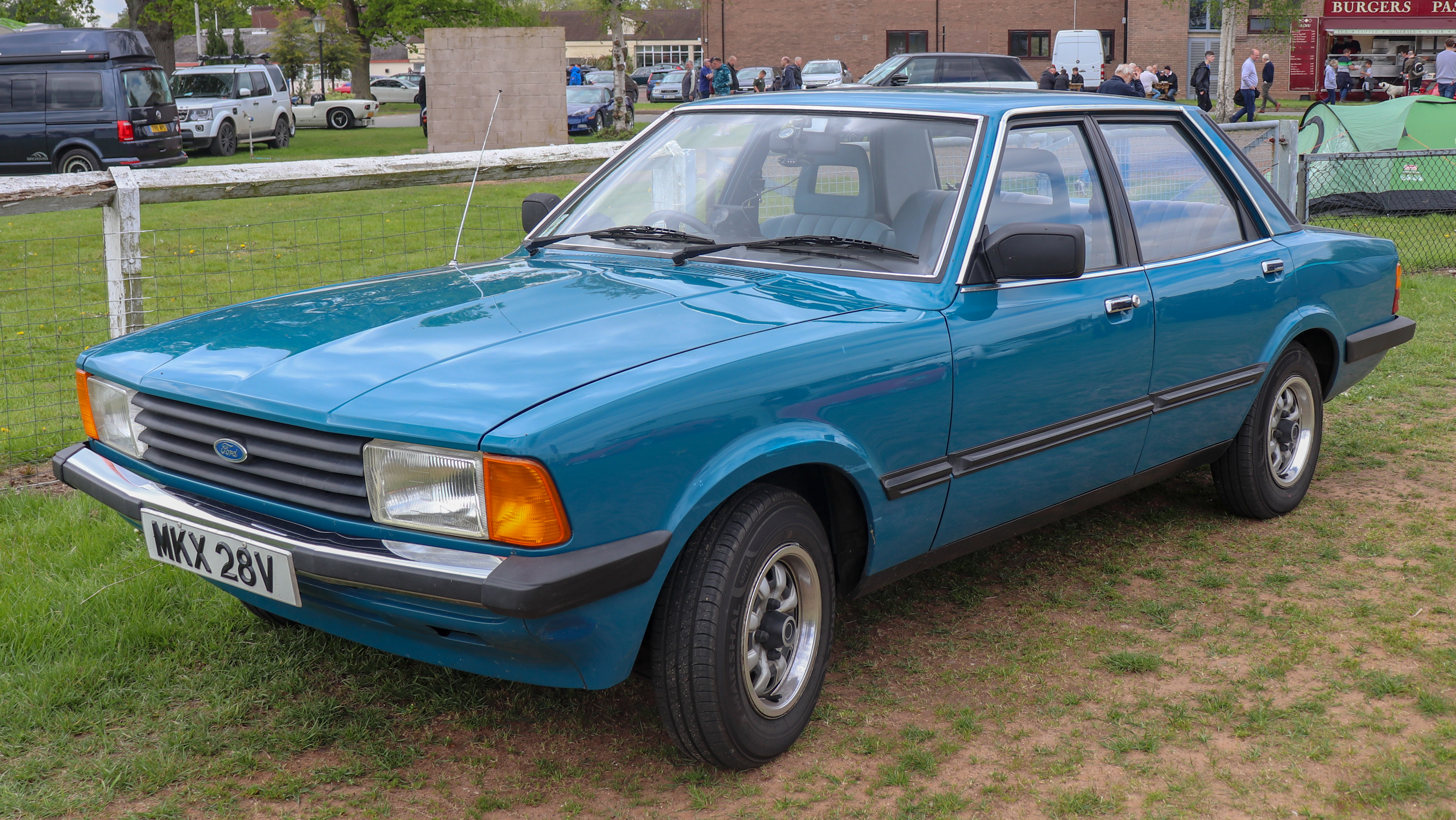
- Ford Cortina GL Mark V Saloon

Overview
- Production: 1979–1982 (Europe); 1979–1984 (South Africa); 1980–1983 (South Korea)
- Assembly: United Kingdom: Dagenham (Ford Dagenham); Australia: Broadmeadows (Ford Australia); New Zealand: Lower Hutt (Ford New Zealand); South Korea: Ulsan (Hyundai); Taiwan: Zhongli City, Taoyuan County (Ford Lio Ho); South Africa: Port Elizabeth (FMCSA)

Body and chassis
- Body style: 2/4-door saloon; 5-door estate; 2-door coupé utility (P100)
- Related: Ford Taunus TC3

Powertrain
- Engine: 1.3 L Crossflow I4; 1.4 L Mitsubishi 4G33 I4 (Cortina Economy); 1.4 L Mitsubishi 4G33 LPG I4 (Taxi models); 1.6 L Crossflow I4; 1.6 L Pinto TL16 I4; 2.0 L Pinto TL20 I4; 2.3 L Cologne V6; 3.0 L Essex V6; 3.3 L Falcon 200 I6; 4.1 L Falcon 250 I6
- Transmission: 4/5-speed manual; 3-speed automatic

Dimensions
- Wheelbase: 101.5 in (2,578 mm)
- Length: 170.9 in (4,341 mm) (saloon); 174.8 in (4,440 mm) (estate)
- Width: 67.2 in (1,707 mm) (saloon); 67.4 in (1,712 mm) (estate)
- Height: 52 in (1,321 mm)

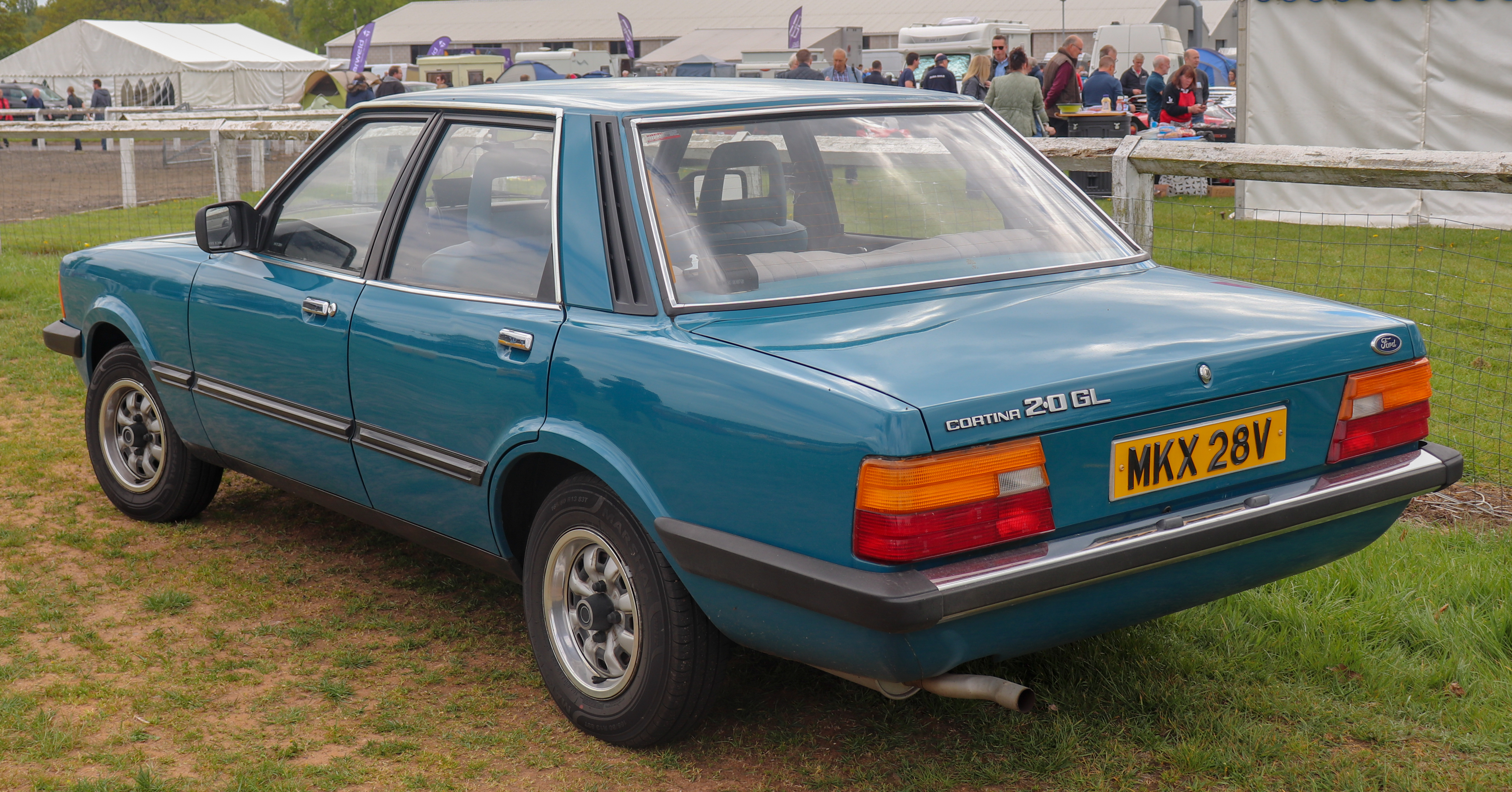
Saloon

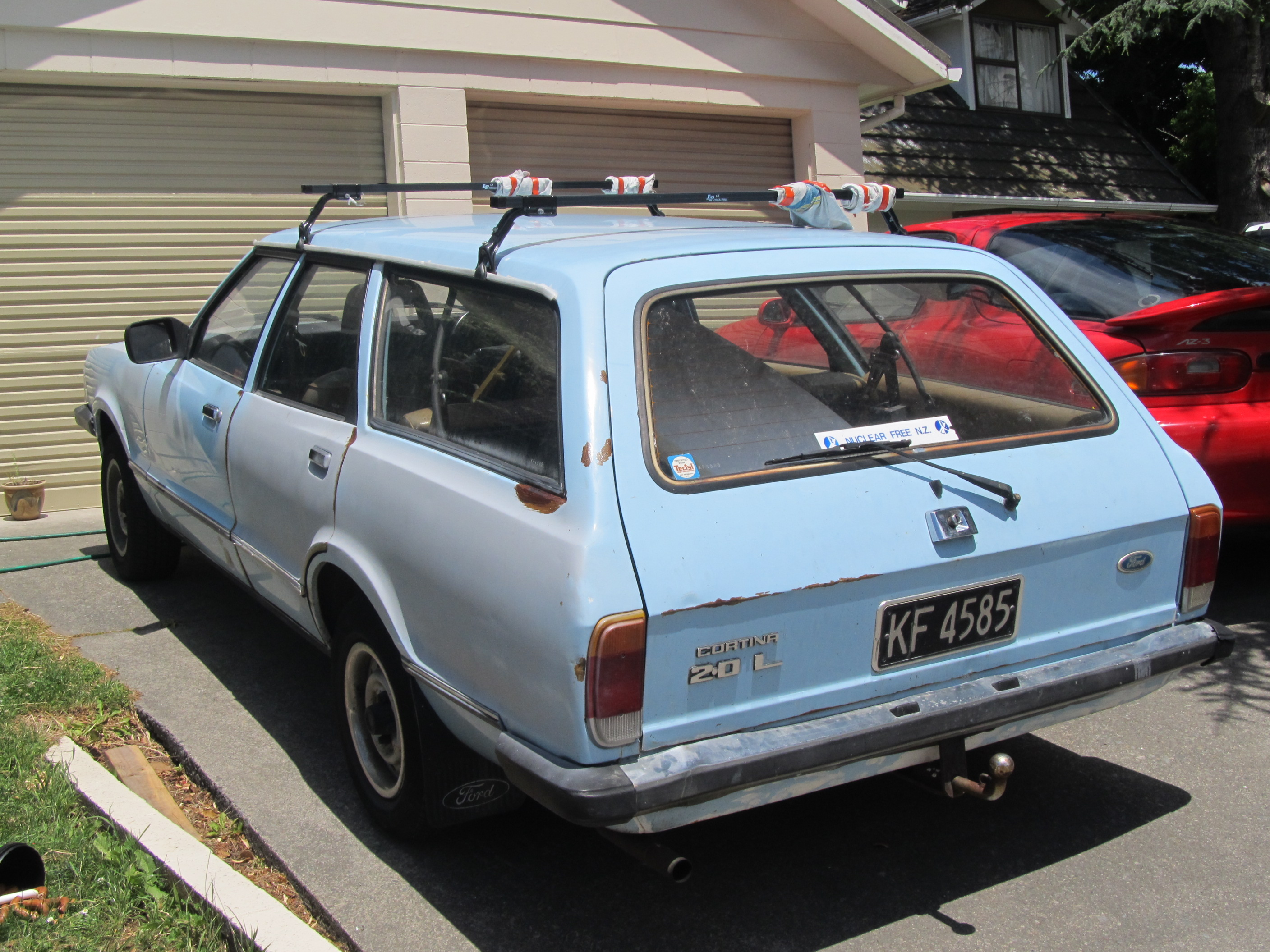
New Zealand market Estate

The Mark V (or TC3) was announced on 24 August 1979. Officially, the programme was code named Teresa, although externally it was marketed as "Cortina 80", but the Mark V tag was given to it immediately on release by the press, insiders and the general public. Prices started at £3,475 for a basic 1.3-litre-engined model.

Largely an update of the Mark IV, it was really a step between a facelift and a rebody. The Mark V differed from the Mark IV by having revised headlights with larger turn indicators incorporated (which were now visible on the side, too), the "Aeroflow" grille (first seen on the Mk1 Fiesta) which was said to be more aerodynamically efficient, a flattened roof, larger glass area, slimmer C-pillars with revised vent covers, larger slatted taillights (on saloon models) and detail changes to the dashboard and interior, most notably a new extended centre console housing the radio to allow for new centre air vents on the fascia. The styling upgrades were done primarily to bring the Cortina/Taunus into line with Ford's current design language seen on the Fiesta MkI, Capri MkIII, and the forthcoming Escort MkIII.

Improvements were also made to the engine range, with slight improvements to both fuel economy and power output compared to the Mark IV. The 2.3-litre V6 engine was given electronic ignition and a slight boost in power output to 116 bhp (87 kW; 118 PS), compared to the 108 bhp (81 kW; 109 PS) of the Mark IV. Ford also claimed improved corrosion protection on Mark V models; as a result, more Mark Vs have survived, but corrosion was still quite a problem.

The estate models combined the Mark IV's bodyshell (which was initially from the 1970 Ford Taunus) with the Mark V front body pressings. A pick-up ("bakkie") version was also built in South Africa. In 1982, the Cortina Pickup received a longer bed and was from then on marketed as the Ford P100.

Variants included the Base, L, GL, and Ghia (all available in saloon and estate forms), together with Base and L specification two-door saloon versions (this body style was available up to Ghia V6 level on overseas markets). The replacement for the previous Mark IV S models was an S package of optional extras, which was available as an upgrade on most Mark V models from L trim level upwards. For the final model year of 1982, this consisted of front and rear bumper overriders, sports driving lamps, an S badge on the boot, tachometer, four-spoke steering wheel, revised suspension settings, front gas shock absorbers, Sports gear-lever knob, Sports road wheels, 185/70 SR x 13 tyres, and fishnet Recaro sports seats (optional). Various "special editions" were announced, including the Calypso and Carousel. The final production model was the Crusader special edition, a run-out model which was available as a 1.3-litre, 1.6-litre and 2.0-litre saloons or 1.6-litre and 2.0-litre estates. It arrived a few months before the launch of its successor, the Sierra. It was the best-specified Cortina produced to date and 30,000 were sold which also made it Ford's best-selling special-edition model. Another special-edition model was the estate Cortina Huntsman, of which 150 were produced. By this time, the Cortina was starting to feel the competition from a rejuvenated (and Opel-influenced) Vauxhall which with the 1981 release Cavalier J-Car, was starting to make inroads on the Cortina's traditional fleet market, largely helped by the front-wheel drive benefits of weight. By the time of the model's demise in 1982 in favour of the Sierra, the Cortina was effectively a 12-year-old design due to the outgoing Mk4/5 being largely a reskin of the 1970 Mk3.

In April 1980, the Mk V Cortina was released in Australia, where it was known as the TF Cortina. It sold poorly and was quietly dropped in 1981. The Drive website later suggested very firmly that the model, in its six-cylinder versions, was a "lemon", and as well as having "dubious build quality" and a "hard ride", it had "a large six under the bonnet and no weight in the back", and was therefore "an ill-handling and unwieldy monster".

Up to and including 1981, the Cortina was the best-selling car in Britain. Even during its final production year, 1982, the Cortina was Britain's second-best selling car and most popular large family car. On the Continent, the Taunus version was competing with more modern and practical designs like the Talbot Alpine, Volkswagen Passat, and Opel Ascona.

The last Cortina – a silver Crusader – rolled off the Dagenham production line on 22 July 1982 on the launch of the Sierra, though a few were still leaving the forecourt as late as 1987, with one final unregistered Cortina GL leaving a Derbyshire dealership in 2005. The last Cortina built in England remains in the Ford Heritage Centre in Daventry.

== Sales success ==
In 1967, the Ford Cortina interrupted the Austin/Morris 1100/1300s reign as Britain's best-selling car. It was Britain's best-selling car for nine out of ten years between 1972 and 1981, narrowly being outsold by the Ford Escort in 1976.

The final incarnation of the Cortina was Britain's best-selling car in 1980 and 1981, also topping the sales charts for 1979 when the range was making the transition from the fourth-generation model to the fifth – in that year it achieved a British record of more than 193,000 sales. Even in 1982, when during its final year of production, it was second only to the Ford Escort.

The Cortina was also a very popular-selling car in New Zealand throughout its production and continued to be sold new until 1984.

Although the Sierra went on sale in October 1982, thousands of Cortinas were still unsold at this point. More than 11,000 were sold in 1983, with five examples being sold as late as 1987 when the Sierra Sapphire eventually launched.

Its demise left Ford without a traditional four-door saloon of this size, as the Sierra was initially available only as a hatchback or estate. Ford later addressed this by launching a saloon version of the Sierra (the Sierra Sapphire) at the time of a major facelift in early 1987. It also added an Escort-based four-door saloon, the Orion, to the range in 1983 – attracting many former Cortina buyers.

More than 2.8 million Cortinas were sold in Britain during its 20-year, five-generation production run, and in March 2009, the Cortina was still the third-most popular car ever sold there, despite having been out of production for nearly three decades. Such was its popularity that though it was only produced for three years of the 1980s, the Cortina was still Britain's seventh-best selling car of that decade with almost 500,000 sales. It remained a popular buy on the used market and a common sight on British roads until well into the 1990s.

As of December 2019, 3,826 Cortinas are still registered on the road, with a further 3,480 currently SORN. With the supply of good European built examples dwindling, enthusiasts have increasingly imported South African and New Zealand-built Cortinas into the UK. The warm, dry climate of these countries means that fewer cars have succumbed to corrosion and they have the added benefit of being right-hand drive. Such was the growth of imports that in December 2023 there were 4,658 Cortinas registered for the road; one of the few examples of a British non-sports car whose popularity has seen the number of preserved examples increase.

The BBC Two documentary series Arena had a segment about the car and its enthusiasts, aired in January 1982, six months before the end of production, by which time Ford had confirmed that the Cortina name would be axed in favour of Sierra, which prompted a notable backlash from comedian Alexi Sayle. The episode ended with a Mk1 Cortina being ceremoniously cubed in a car crusher.

British punk rock band The Clash referenced the car in the song "Janie Jones", singing "He's just like everyone, he's got a Ford Cortina that just won't run without fuel."

British indie band Arctic Monkeys put to music a poem "I Wanna Be Yours" by John Cooper Clarke in 2013, which contains the line "I want to be your Ford Cortina, I will never rust."

Irish Rock band The Saw Doctors released a song called "Red Cortina" in 1991, in which they sing "Your father used to drop you off, You'd step out of a Red Cortina."

English singer Elton John mentions a blue Ford Cortina in his song "Made In England."

== Racing and rallying ==
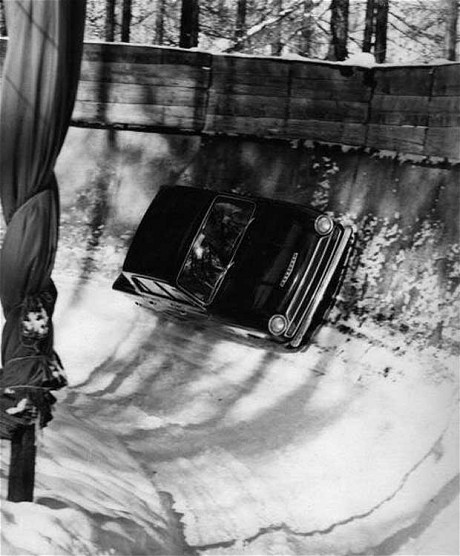
Henry Taylor driving a Ford Cortina down the Olympic bobsleigh run at Cortina d'Ampezzo, Italy

During the 1960s and 1970s, the Ford Cortina Lotus was a successful rally and racing car in a wide variety of competitions across Europe and North America. The standard Cortina was rarely used in competition of any sort, but benefited from the publicity generated by the Lotus versions.

At the end of their lives, however, many Cortinas did see action on oval racing circuits in the UK, as their rigidity and ready availability during the 1980s and 1990s made them a popular choice for banger racing. Although Cortinas are now relatively rare, they remain coveted by the banger racing fraternity and all-Cortina meetings are still occasional fixtures on the racing calendar.

Ian Geoghegan won the 1964 Australian Touring Car Championship driving a Ford Cortina GT.

== Other cars using Cortina engines ==
The Kent engines used in the Cortina (popularly known as the "Crossflow"), being lightweight, reliable, and inexpensive, were popular with several low-volume sports-car manufacturers, including Morgan, which used them in the 1962–80 4/4 (and continued to use Ford engines in most of their models until 2020). The engines are also found in a number of British kit cars and are the basis of Formula Ford racing.

The Kent engines were also used in several smaller Fords, most notably the Escort, lower end Capris and Fiesta.

The Pinto OHC engines used in the Mk.III onwards, as well as being fitted to contemporary Capris, Granadas, and Transits, were carried over to the Sierra for its first few years of production, before gradually being phased out by the newer CVH and DOHC units. Like the Kent Crossflow, they were also extensively used in kit cars; as a result, many Cortinas were scrapped solely for their engines, with the 2.0-litre Pintos being the most popular.

In recent years, the opposite phenomenon has become popular among enthusiasts, where classic Cortinas have been retrofitted with modern Ford engines – the most popular unit being the Zetec unit from the Mondeo and Focus. The Zetec, although originally intended only for front-wheel drive installation, can be adapted to a rear-wheel drive use as found with Formula Continental race cars.

== Sales and manufacture outside the United Kingdom ==
The Cortina was also sold in other right-hand drive markets, such as Pakistan, Ireland (where it was assembled locally), Australia, New Zealand, Indonesia, Malaysia, Singapore, Thailand (local production 1961–76 as a joint venture with Anglo-Thai Motor Company, Ford's import distributor), Malta, and South Africa. Mark III Cortina estates were adopted as police cars in Hong Kong. The Cortina was also assembled in left-hand drive in the Philippines, South Korea (by Hyundai as its first model), and Taiwan (by Ford Lio Ho) until the early 1980s.

The first two generations of the car were also sold through American Ford dealers in the 1960s. The Cortina competed fairly successfully there against most of the other small imports of its day, including General Motors's Opel Kadett, the Renault Dauphine, and the just-appearing Toyotas and Datsuns, although none of them approached the phenomenal success of the Volkswagen Beetle. The Cortina was withdrawn from the US market when Ford decided to produce a domestic small car in 1971, the Ford Pinto, though it continued in Canada (with the Cortina Mark III) until the end of the 1973 model year. Subsequent European Ford products after the Cortina for the USA market (with the exception of the Fiesta Mk I circa 1978–80) were sold through Lincoln-Mercury dealerships (most notably the Ford Capri (MkI and II) and Ford Sierra – the latter of which was marketed in the USA under the Merkur marque).

The Cortina was also sold in some Continental European markets, such as Scandinavia, alongside the Taunus, as well as Portugal, being assembled in Ford's factory in Amsterdam from the launch in 1962 until 1975. Production was for the Dutch market, but also for export to non-EC countries and even for export to the UK if the demand there was higher than the UK production capacity.

=== Australia ===
Ford Australia built a slightly modified Cortina at their Broadmeadows Assembly Plant alongside the Falcon, its derivatives and the Escort.

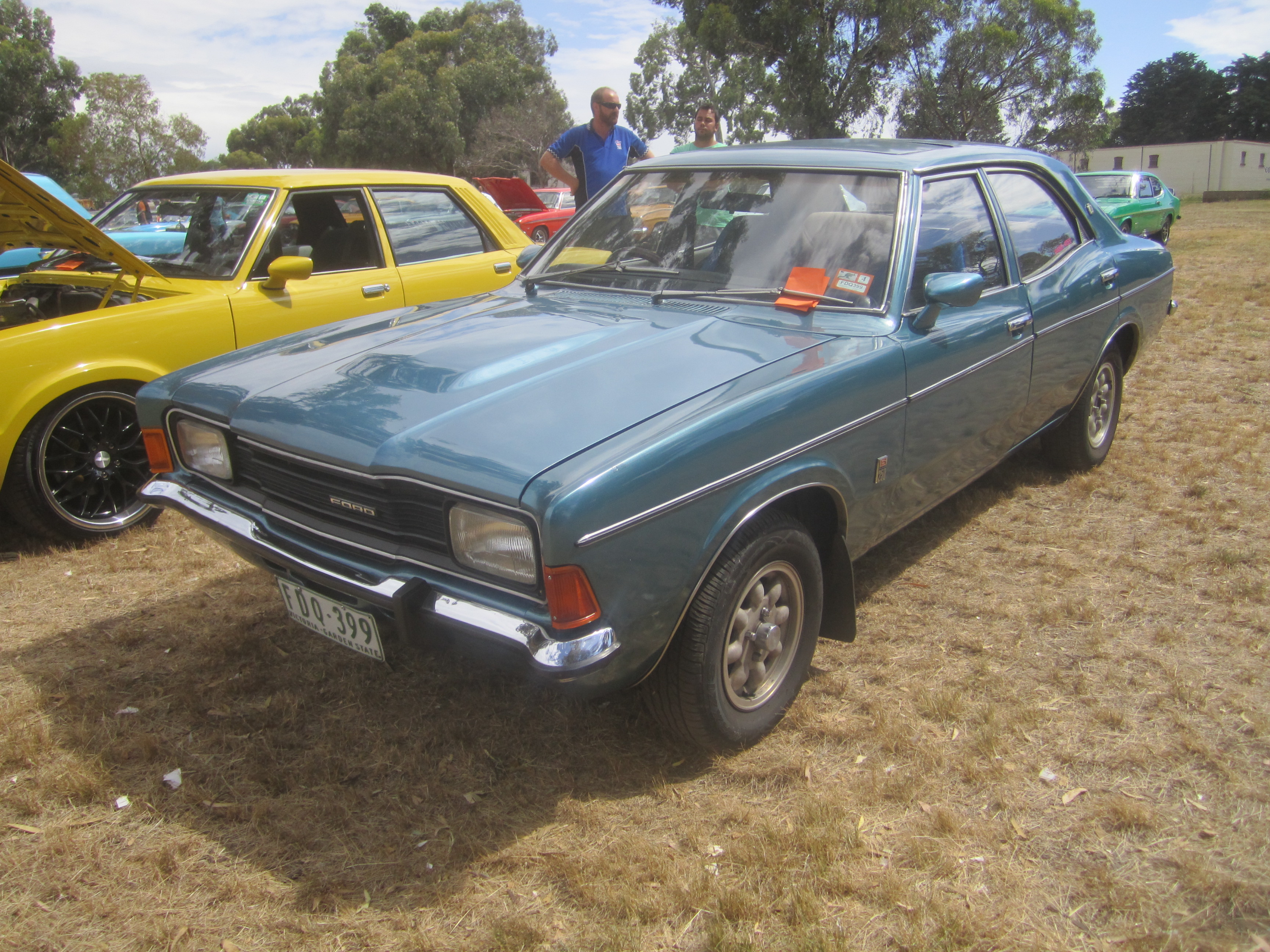
A 1974 Cortina XL sedan with a 250 cu in (4.1 L) 6-cylinder, indicated by the bonnet bulge

The Australian Cortina was fairly similar to the British offerings until the release of the TC Cortina in 1970 when it gained its notability as an Australian icon after Ford of Australia decided to donate some components from its larger Falcon range. Additions included the 200 and 250 cubic inch inline 6 engines and a range of Australian BorgWarner transmissions. The TD facelift included a more refined interior and rectangular headlights, standard on the XL & XLe. The TE and TF Cortina returned to following the British design almost to a T, however retaining the 200 and 250 6-cylinder engines, now with the revised Crossflow head. Throughout its life, the Cortina was also available in a range of colours from the Falcon lineup.

Many Australian Cortinas have been modified as Street Machines, with the homemade 'Redtop' Barra Turbo engine being a common mill transplant, alongside the 302 Windsor, although being a Canadian design, with the Windsor being installed in hundreds of thousands of Falcons over the years, they are no rarity, backed by GM T350, Ford C10, Top-loader and ZF6 being common boxes.

Available on the Australian (and South African, however very different) Cortina Mark III, was the XLe variant, the top specification, and a widely recognised nameplate in the country. The XLe Came with standard bucket seats, vinyl roof, 250c.i. Inline 6, 3 speed automatic BorgWarner transmission, full instrumentation, boot garnish and many more luxury style additions. The XLe was comparable to a combination of the British GXL and GT.

The Cortina ended production in 1981 and was in the interim replaced by the Meteor (Laser sedan) in the local product range until the Telstar could be put into local assembly in 1983.

=== New Zealand ===
The New Zealand Cortina range generally followed that of Britain. Overall complete knock-down assembly ran from 1962 to June 1983, at Ford's Lower Hutt (Seaview) plant.

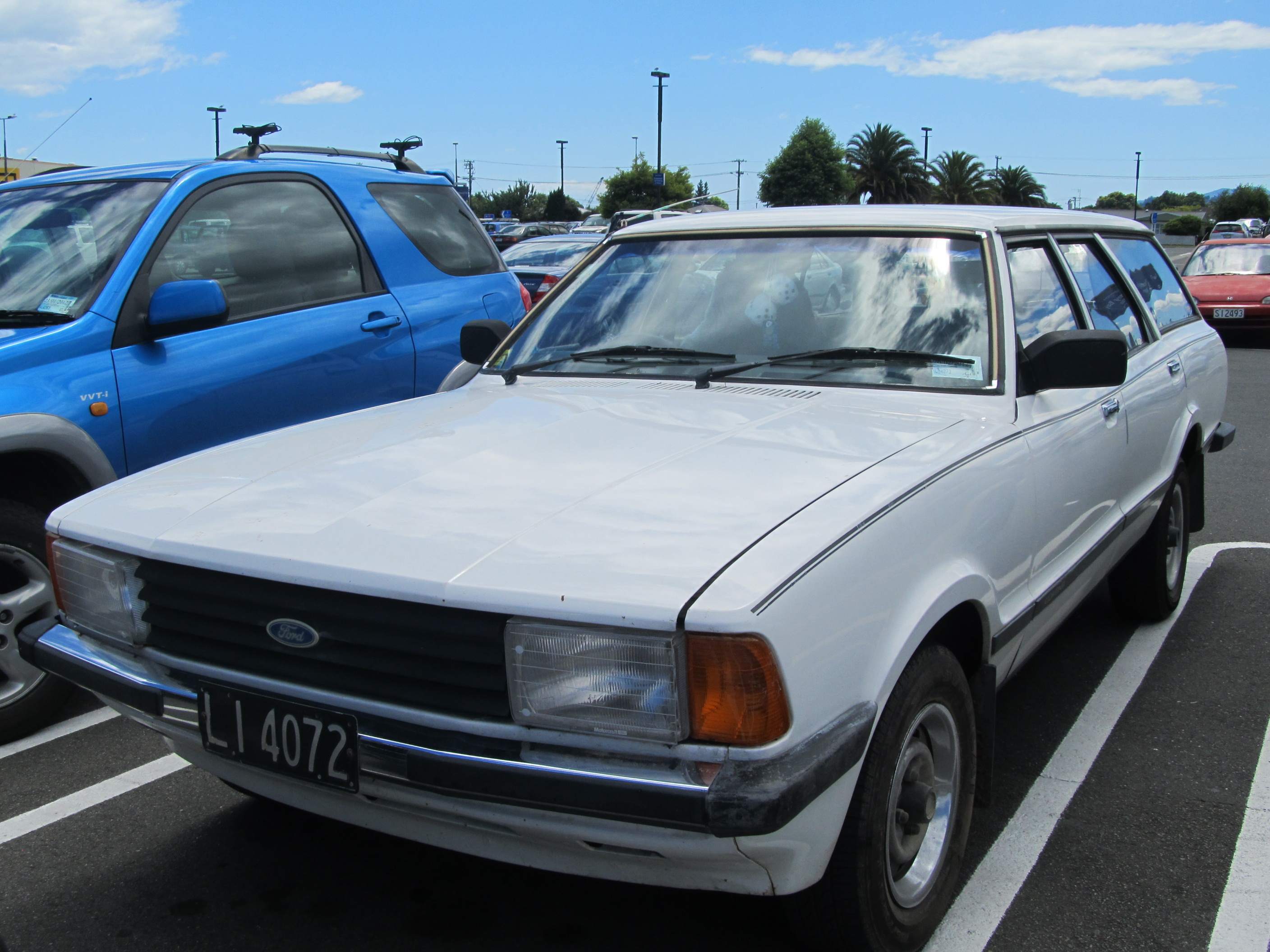
A 1983 Cortina estate (NZ assembled)

The Mark IV Cortina range, introduced into local assembly early in 1977, was very similar to that offered in the UK – a main specification difference, however, was the use of metric instrumentation, and that a two-door sedan was not offered. Engine sizes of 1.6 litres and 2.0 litres were available. The 2.0-litre was a very popular fleet vehicle and the transport of thousands of sales representatives in New Zealand over the years.

Additionally, limited imports were made of Australian Mark IV Cortinas, equipped with both 2.0-litre four-cylinder engines which featured more emissions control equipment than the UK-sourced cars, and the Falcon's 4.1-litre six-cylinder engines.

The Mark V range was introduced early in 1980, a range that featured 1.6 base, 2.0 L, 2.0 GL, 2.0 Ghia, 2.3 V6 Ghia, and wagon variants for the 1.6 base and 2.0 L. The 2.0, unencumbered by emissions regulations, has 74 kW (101 PS; 99 hp) at 5200 rpm. In 1982 the 2.0 GL model was discontinued and replaced with a 2.0 S (Sport) model, and unlike in the UK, it was a model in its own right. The "S" received a black, two-piece front spoiler and a rear spoiler. Two halogen extra lights were standard, as was a body-coloured grille. Most of the chrome trim was blacked out, while the steel wheels received a chrome band. A 2.0 commercial van was also introduced – essentially a Cortina estate without rear seats, aimed towards fleet buyers.

All 2.0-litre models had the option of automatic transmission, and with the 2.3-litre V6, it was the only transmission offered. The 2.3 also received power steering and additional sound-deadening material. A five-speed box was not available. A unique option, offered under guarantee by a dealership, South Auckland Ford, was a turbocharger.

The Ghia models were equipped similarly to UK models, but only the 2.3-litre V6 models featured imported Ford alloy wheels. Ford Rostyle steel rims were fitted to all 2.0 GL, Ghia, and S models, optionally on the other models. New Zealand Ghia models, however, did not feature a steel sliding sunroof (fitted as standard on UK Ghia models), although some models did feature an aftermarket sunroof.

The Cortina was a popular car in New Zealand, being the most sold car in seven years with over 100,000 assembled in total. It was missed by many when it ceased production in June 1983, notably after Ford New Zealand had scoured the globe for surplus assembly kits, a number of which came from Cork in Ireland. Station wagons (estate models) remained available until 1984. The Cortina range was finally replaced by the 1983 Ford Telstar range and the 1984 Ford Sierra station wagon. Sales had been dropping in the early 1980s, though, with the average age of buyers in 1981 being between 45 and 54. Quality and fitment were also issues of concern, with the local assembler welcoming the Cortina's Mazda-built replacement.

Compared with Britain and many other countries where the Cortina was originally exported, in New Zealand, it has a far superior survival rate due to the climate being far drier and more favourable to the preservation of rust-free classic cars. Seeing examples in everyday use, especially New Zealand's rural areas, is not uncommon, and obtaining spare parts to keep them on the roads has yet to become a significant problem. New Zealand has been a popular source of good-condition Cortinas to export back to the UK, where rust has condemned the majority.

=== South Africa ===
In South Africa, the Cortina range included V6 Essex-engined variants, in both 2.5-litre and 3.0-litre forms.

From July 1971, a locally designed pick-up truck version (known in Afrikaans as a "bakkie") was also offered, and this remained in production even after the Cortina was replaced by the Sierra. The Mark V-based Cortina Pickup was exported to the UK, in a lengthened wheelbase form, as the Ford P100. This pick-up was launched in the UK in 1982, the year that the standard Cortina was being replaced by the Sierra. This version of the P100 was sold until 1988, when Ford divested from South Africa, and a Portuguese-built Sierra pick-up was introduced in its place, still using the P100 name.

The Mark V model range, introduced in 1980 for the South African market, included 1.3-litre L (1980–1982), 1.6-litre L, GL (1980–1983), 2.0-litre GL, Ghia, (1980–1984), 3.0-litre XR6 (1980–1983), 1.6-litre L Estate (1980–1983), 2.0-litre GL Estate (1980–1983), 3.0-litre GLS (1980–1984), 1.6-litre One-Tonner (1980–1985), and 3.0-litre One-Tonner (1980–1985).

The XR6 was a sports version that used the Essex V6 and featured body aerofoils and sport seats.

In 1981, a version called the XR6 Interceptor was released as a homologation special made to compete in production car racing. They featured triple Weber DCNF carburetors, aggressive camshaft, tubular exhaust manifold, suspension revisions, and wider Ronal 13-inch wheels. They produced 118 kW and were only available in red; 250 were produced.

Later on, a special-edition XR6 TF was released to celebrate 'Team Fords' racing success with the XR6. They were essentially XR6s in exterior and interior Team Ford colours, which were blue and white.

In 1983, a special version was created by Simpson Ford to appease the demand for an Interceptor-like Cortina and was sold through Ford dealerships countrywide. It was called the XR6 X-ocet and featured a Holley carburettor, aggressive camshaft and tuned exhaust. They came in red with a white lower quarter and did 0–100 km/h (62 mph) in 8.5 seconds with a top speed of 195 km/h (121 mph).

South African Mark V models differed slightly from UK models with different wheels, bumpers, and interior trim.

The last brand new Cortina was sold in South Africa by mid-1984. It was often the country's top-selling car, being far more popular than the Sierra, Telstar, and Mondeo models that followed it.

=== South Korea ===
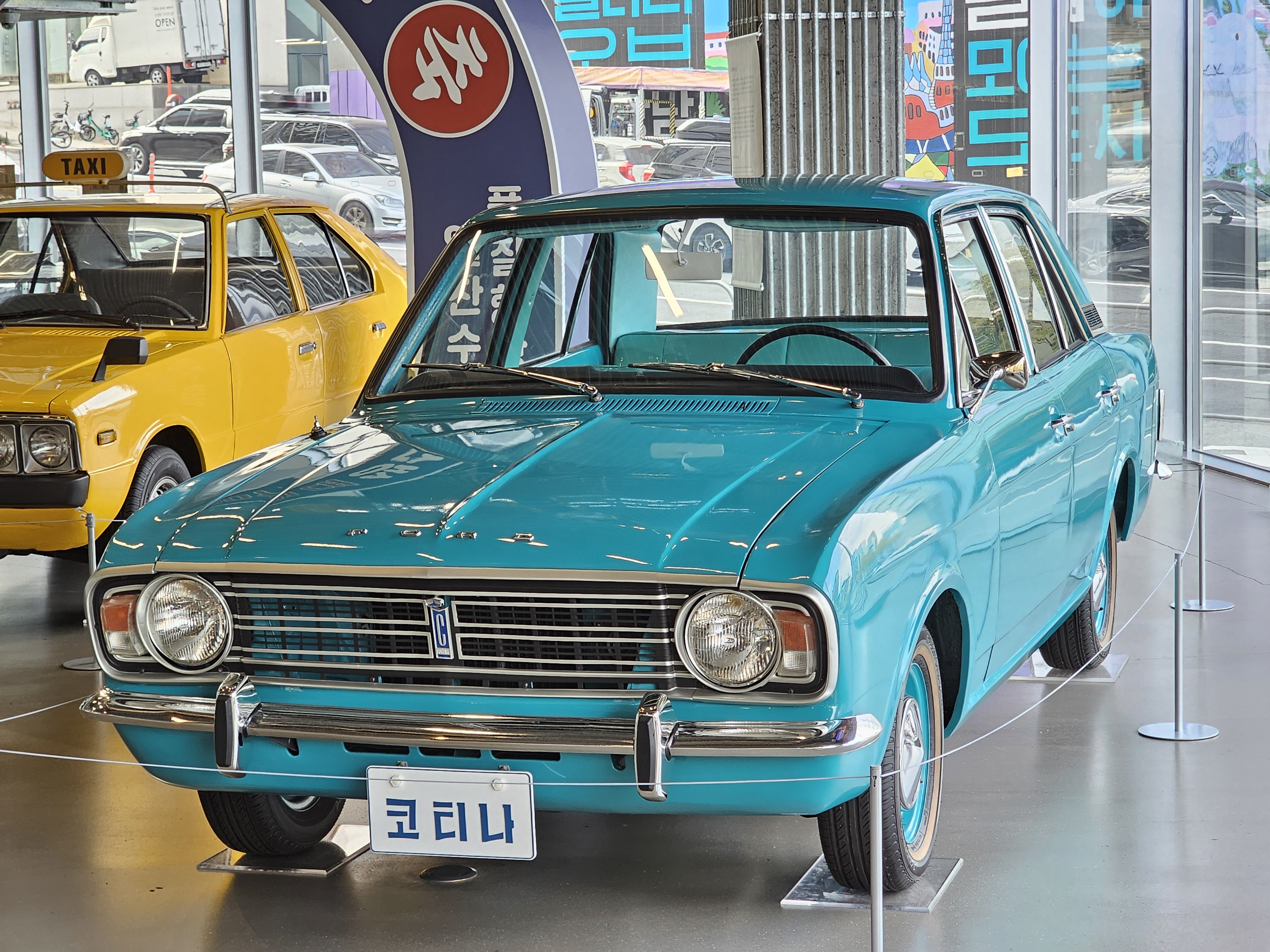
Hyundai Cortina

The newly established Hyundai Motor Company began assembling the Mk2 Cortina under licence at its Ulsan plant in 1967. The later Hyundai Pony and Stellar, although not directly based on the Cortina/Taunus still used common componentry – most notably the rear suspension and axle which were interchangeable with the Ford car.

=== Pakistan ===
In the early 1960s, Cortinas were assembled by Ali Automobiles in Karachi.
