= Ford Essex V4 engine =

Automobile engine

Ford Essex V4
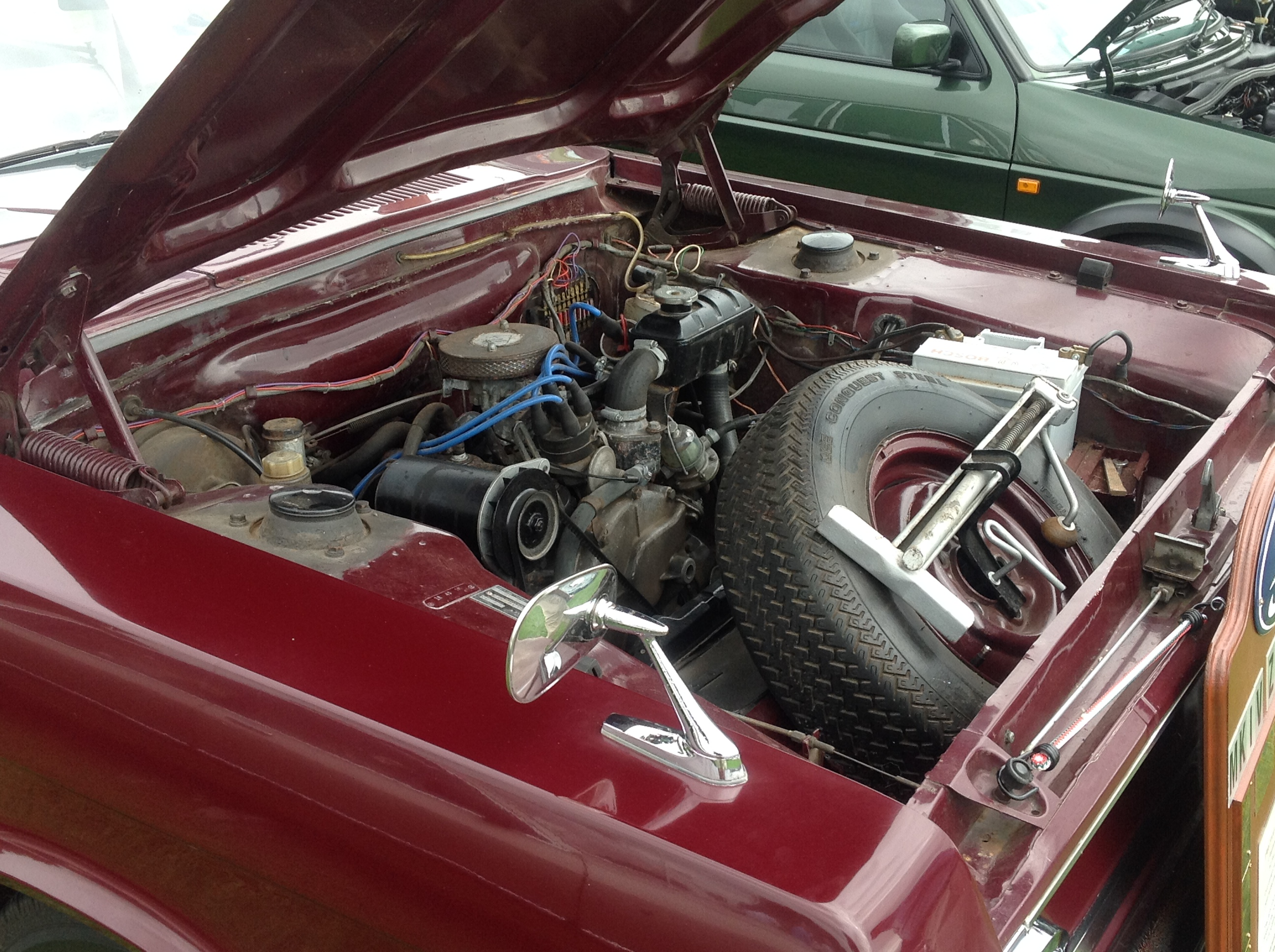
- Ford Essex V4 in a 1966 Zephyr

Overview
- Manufacturer: Ford Motor Company
- Production: 1965 - 1977

Layout
- Configuration: Naturally aspirated 60° V4
- Displacement: 1.7 L (1,663 cc; 101.5 cu in); 2.0 L (1,996 cc; 121.8 cu in)
- Cylinder bore: 93.66 mm (3.69 in)
- Piston stroke: 60.35 mm (2.38 in) (1.7 L); 72.42 mm (2.85 in) (2.0 L)
- Cylinder block material: Cast iron
- Cylinder head material: Cast iron
- Valvetrain: OHV, two valves per cylinder
- Valvetrain drive system: Gears
- Compression ratio: 7.7:1 / 8.9:1 / 9.0:1 / 9.1:1

Combustion
- Fuel system: Ford 1250 1-bbl carburettor Weber 32/36 DGAV 2-bbl carburettor
- Fuel type: Petrol (leaded)
- Oil system: Wet sump
- Cooling system: Water-cooled

Output
- Power output: 73 bhp (54 kW; 74 PS) (LC 1.7 L); 92 bhp (69 kW; 93 PS) (HC 2.0 L)
- Torque output: 135 N⋅m (100 lb⋅ft) (1.7 L); 166 N⋅m (122 lb⋅ft) (2.0 L)

Dimensions
- Dry weight: 148 kg (326 lb)

Chronology
- Predecessor: Ford Zephyr engine (4 cylinder)
- Successor: Ford Pinto engine

The Essex V4 is a V4 petrol engine manufactured by the Ford Motor Company from 1965 to 1977. The engine was available in both 1.7 L and 2.0 L capacities. Designed by Ford of Britain, the Essex V4 was produced at a plant in Dagenham, originally in the county of Essex, later part of east London. The engine was used in the Ford Corsair, Capri Mk I, Consul/Granada Mk I, Ford Zephyr Mk IV and the Ford Transit Mk I van.

== History ==
Development of the Essex engine family began in 1961. While design of the new engine would be handled by engine design director Alan Worters and a team consisting of Alan Aitken, John Pask, and George Soule, a product planning team would also be involved. The first product strategy meeting was chaired by Ford product planning manager Terence Beckett. Philip Ives was manager of a new engine and transmissions planning department.

The project's goal was to produce an engine suitable for use in both passenger cars and work vans, with marine and industrial applications also under consideration. Right from the outset both high- and low-compression petrol versions were planned, as was a diesel version. For the van application, the product planners examined the features of the market-leading Volkswagen Transporter. While Ford would not duplicate the Volkswagen's rear-engined drivetrain, the advantages of its flat floor and unimpeded driver access led to the team proposing a vehicle with a V4 engine mounted ahead of the driver to free up cargo space. In the end both a V4 and V6 engine were approved, sharing a 60° included angle between the cylinder banks and an oversquare bore and stroke ratio. The resulting Essex V4 and Essex V6 engines share the same combustion chamber design and some internal dimensions and have many parts in common, including pistons, valves, and spark plugs.

While work was progressing in England on the van to be called the V-series, Ford of Germany was proceeding with a design for a new commercial van of their own to be called the Transit. Ford in Germany already had a V4 engine in production; the American-designed Ford Taunus V4 engine, and it was this engine that they proposed to use in their new vehicle. Both van projects were presented to management, who was already moving to consolidate both product lines and corporate divisions in Europe and Britain. The decision was made to approve a single body and chassis but allow England and Germany to use their own engines. The V-series name was also dropped in favour of the Transit name in England.

A £14 million investment in renovations to the Dagenham plant where the new engines would be produced was funded. The Essex V4 first appeared in 1965 in both the Ford Transit Mk1 van and the Ford Corsair saloon.

== Technical details ==
The Essex V4 is a 60° V4 engine with a cast iron cylinder block and heads. The engine block was just 20 in (510 mm) long. The engine uses crossflow cylinder heads with 2 overhead valves per cylinder operated through pushrods and rocker arms by a single camshaft in the block. Inlet valves had a diameter of 41 mm (1.6 in), while exhaust valves were 37 mm (1.5 in).

All Essex V4s had the same 93.66 mm (3.69 in) bore diameter, but the 1.7 L version had a stroke length of 60.35 mm (2.38 in) and the 2.0 L version had a stroke length of 72.42 mm (2.85 in). Connecting rod lengths were the same, so the different displacements were achieved by changing the crankshaft throw lengths and the piston heights. The cylinder firing order was 1-3-4-2.

The 1.7 L and 2.0 L engines in the Transit van had a standard compression ratio of 7.7:1. A ratio of 9.1:1 was standard for 1.7 L engines in passenger cars, while 8.9:1 was standard for 2.0 L engines in passenger cars and was optional for the 2.0 L in the Transit. Power output varied from 73 hp (54.4 kW) for the low-compression 1.7 L engine to 93 hp (69.4 kW) for the high-compression 2.0 L engine, while torque ranged from 100 lb⋅ft (136 N⋅m) to 123.5 lb⋅ft (167.4 N⋅m). With the Essex V4 engine's Heron cylinder head design and bowl-in-crown pistons, different compression ratios were achieved with different cylinder heads. Low-compression cylinder heads such as the ones fitted to Ford Transits had shallow combustion chambers in them while high-compression heads were completely flat.

To counteract the engine vibration inherent in a 60° V4, Ford added a balance shaft to the Essex V4. In the related Essex V6 these vibrations were less pronounced, so the V6 did not have a balance shaft. Even with the balance shaft, and notwithstanding Ford's promoting the V4-equipped Corsair as "The car that is seen and not heard", reviewers of V4-powered cars frequently commented on the engine's lack of smoothness.

For the 1967 release of the Corsair 2000E the 2.0 L engine received larger ports, a new camshaft, and a 2-bbl Weber 32DIF carburettor on a new intake manifold in place of the earlier 1-bbl Zenith Stromberg. These changes brought horsepower to 97 hp (72.3 kW) at 5000 rpm, up from 88 hp (65.6 kW). A revised clutch and flywheel were fitted in July 1968, and in October of the same year the oil pump was redesigned.

Between 1971 and 1972 the Essex V4 (and V6) engines were upgraded again. Power output increased by using a different camshaft, changing the shape of the inlet ports from an O shape to a D shape and increasing the compression ratio slightly from 8.9:1 to 9.0:1. Other changes included moving the oil dipstick from the front to the left side of the engine, and making the camshaft drive gear out of steel with fibre teeth.

The change to the camshaft drive gear was made to address a weakness in the engine. This timing gear was originally a fibre composite part that could break at high rpm or with age. Since the engine was an interference type, a failed timing gear made it possible for the pistons to contact any valves left open and do significant damage. Another weakness was in the oil pump drive. The camshaft drove the distributor (Ford or Lucas) through a skew gear, which in turn drove a hexagonal shaft that powered the oil pump. If the hex shaft rounded off it would no longer engage with the distributor drive and the oil pump would stop, starving the engine of oil.

Other problems experienced with early engines included leaking head gaskets, worn balance shaft bearings, and big-end or main bearing failures.

== Applications ==
Released in 1965, the MK1 Transit with its flat front and short bonnet was designed for the Essex V4. Both 1.7 L and 2.0 L versions were available at the outset. The planned diesel version of the Essex did not reach production, so a Perkins inline-4 diesel engine was made available in Mk1 Transits, which required a longer "Bullnose" bonnet to clear the longer engine.

Also debuting in 1965, the Ford Corsair offered both the 1.7 L and 2.0 L versions of the engine. Coachbuilder Crayford Engineering produced their own Ford Corsair V4 GT Crayford Convertible with the 2.0 L V4 from 1966 to 1968. A V4-powered estate conversion was built by coachbuilder Abbott. A revised Essex V4 with a 2-bbl carburettor was fitted in the 2000E version of the Corsair. The most powerful factory version of the Essex V4 appeared in the Ford Corsair 2000E Deluxe and produced 103 hp (104.4 PS; 76.8 kW).

The revised Zephyr Mk IV line debuted in 1966. The Zephyr 4 model was powered by the 2.0 L Essex. The model remained in production until 1972.

In 1969 the Capri 2000GT mounted a 2.0 L Essex V4 producing 92 hp (93.3 PS; 68.6 kW) at 5500 rpm and 141 N⋅m (104.0 lb⋅ft) of torque at 3600 rpm. When the Capri II was released in 1974, the 2.0 L Essex V4 was replaced by either the 2.0 L OHC Pinto TL20 inline-4 or the 2.0 L Ford Cologne V6 engine.

The Mk1 Granada, released in March 1972 as the Corsair's replacement, was also available with the 2.0 L Essex V4. The Granada-based Ford Consul offered either the 1.7 L or 2.0 L displacements from 1972 to 1974.

The Essex V4 was used by Marcos sports cars in their Marcos 2 litre model. Released in 1969, this version remained in production until 1971; the company went into receivership one year later. When the Marcos GT was revived in component form in 1982 the Essex V4 was included in the list of supported engines. Total production of V4 Marcos cars is usually estimated to have been 78 units, although some references report as few as just 40 cars.

=== Essex V4 UK production history ===
Date	Event
October 1965	Corsair V4 1.7 and 2.0 litre models released. UK Transit van 1.7 and 2.0 litre models released.
April 1966	Zephyr Four Mark IV 2.0 litre model released.
November 1968	Corsair 1.7 litre model discontinued.
March 1969	Capri 2000GT 2.0 litre V4 model released.
June 1970	Corsair 2.0 litre model discontinued.
December 1971	Zephyr Four 2.0 litre model discontinued.
March 1972	Consul 1.7 and 2.0 litre model released.
March 1974	Capri 2.0 litre model discontinued.
July 1974	Consul 2.0 litre model discontinued.
1975	Transit 1.7 litre model discontinued.
January 1978	Transit 2.0 litre model discontinued.

=== South Africa ===
The 2.0 L Essex V4 was also built in South Africa, where it was originally fitted to the Corsair. Due to local content laws, the South African motor had a more varied usage, uniquely being fitted to the Cortina TC and to the 17M (Taunus P7), as well as to the Capri. By the early seventies, a more refined version of the engine produced 76.6 kW (104.1 PS; 102.7 hp) SAE, or 64.7 kW (88.0 PS; 86.8 hp) net — similar to the DIN rating.

== See also ==
- List of Ford engines
