= Ford Corsair =

The name Ford Corsair was used both for a car produced by Ford of Britain between 1963 and 1970, and for an unrelated Nissan-based automobile marketed by Ford Australia between 1989 and 1992.

== Ford Consul Corsair (1963–1965) and Ford Corsair V4 (1965–1970) – Britain ==
Ford Consul Corsair Ford Corsair V4
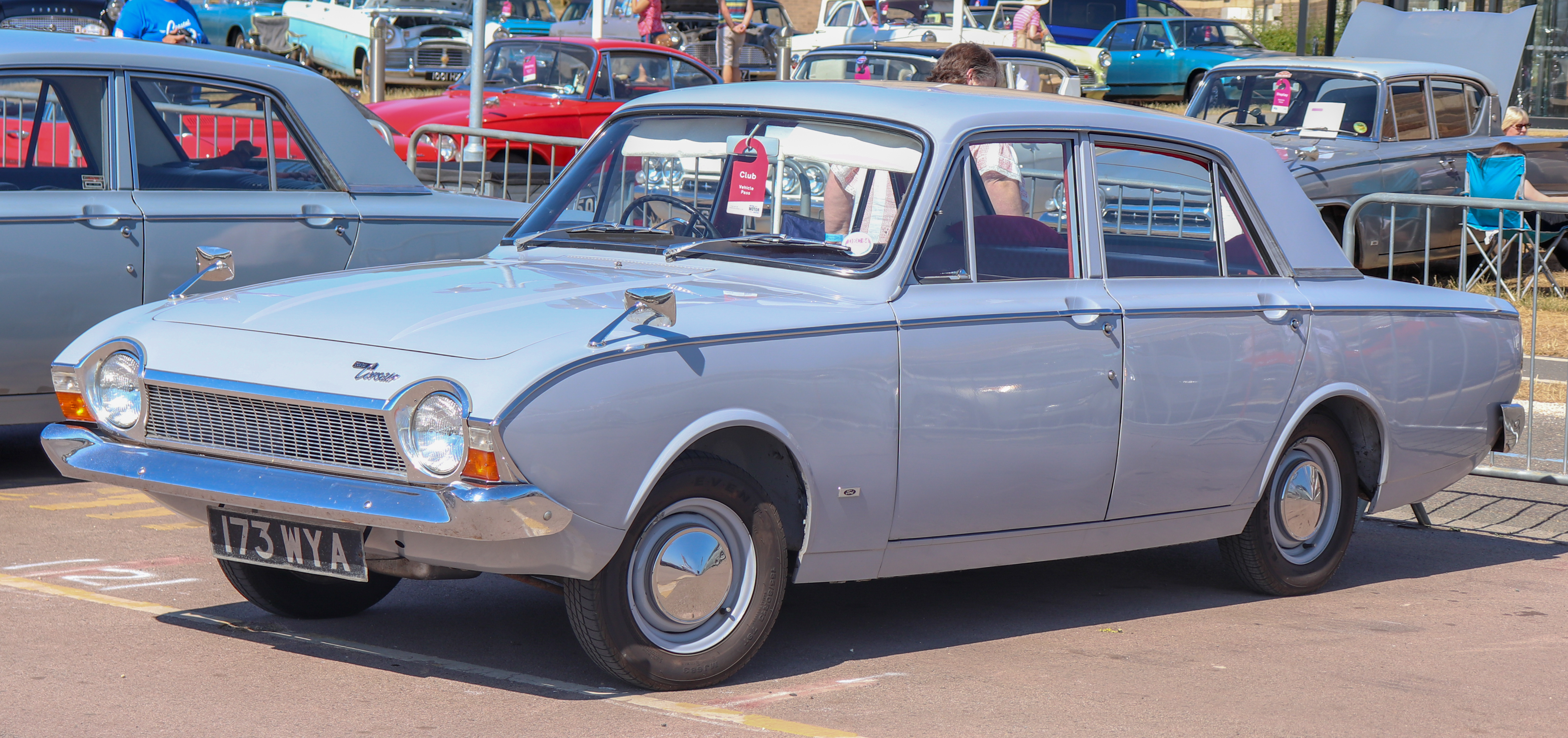

Overview
- Manufacturer: Ford UK
- Production: 1963–1970
- Assembly: United Kingdom: Halewood (1964–1969); United Kingdom: Dagenham (1969–1970)

Body and chassis
- Body style: 4-door saloon 2-door saloon 2-door convertible 2-door cabriolet 5-door estate car
- Layout: Front-engine, rear-wheel-drive
- Related: Ford Cortina Mark 1

Powertrain
- Engine: 1,498 cc (91.4 cu in) Pre-Crossflow I4 (1963–1965); 1,663 cc (101.5 cu in) Essex V4 (1965–1971); 1,996 cc (121.8 cu in) Essex V4 (1966–1971)
- Transmission: 4-speed manual

Dimensions
- Wheelbase: 101.0 in (2,565 mm)
- Length: 176.75 in (4,489 mm)
- Width: 63.5 in (1,613 mm)
- Height: 55.5 in (1,410 mm)
- Kerb weight: 2,194 lb (995 kg)

Chronology
- Successor: Ford Cortina Mark 3

The Ford Consul Corsair (later known simply as the Ford Corsair), manufactured by Ford UK, is a midsized car that was introduced at the London Motor Show in October 1963 and available as either a saloon or estate from 1964 until 1970. Also, a convertible version was built by Crayford Engineering, which is now very rare and highly sought after as a classic. Two-door Corsair saloons are also rare, being built only to order in the UK, although two-doors were produced in quantity for some export markets. The Consul Corsair S was an export-only model with a two-door Deluxe body and 1500GT engine, sold in Austria and Sweden, and also in South Africa as the Corsair 83. Only one example of the fleet model, the Consul Corsair Standard, is known to survive. Unlike the Ford Cortina which had five versions (Mks), or the Ford Capri which had face-lifts, the entire production run of the Ford Corsair was a consistent Mk 1, with the body remaining the same, and the design changes being confined to the interior, engine, and mechanicals.

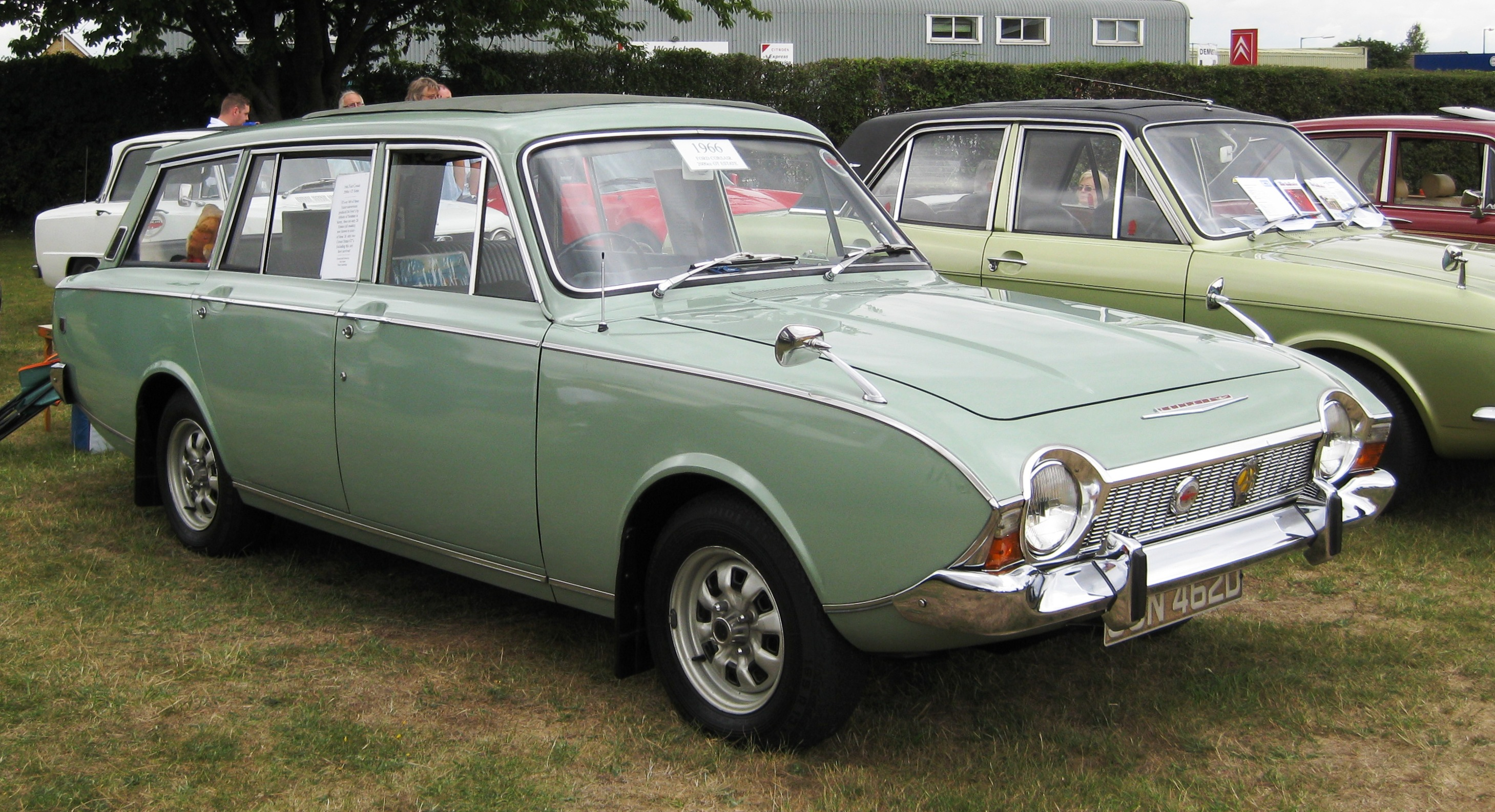
Ford Corsair V4 estate 1966: The stylish Corsair estate conversion was produced by Abbott. It was more expensive than the Cortina estate, but offered no more load capacity.

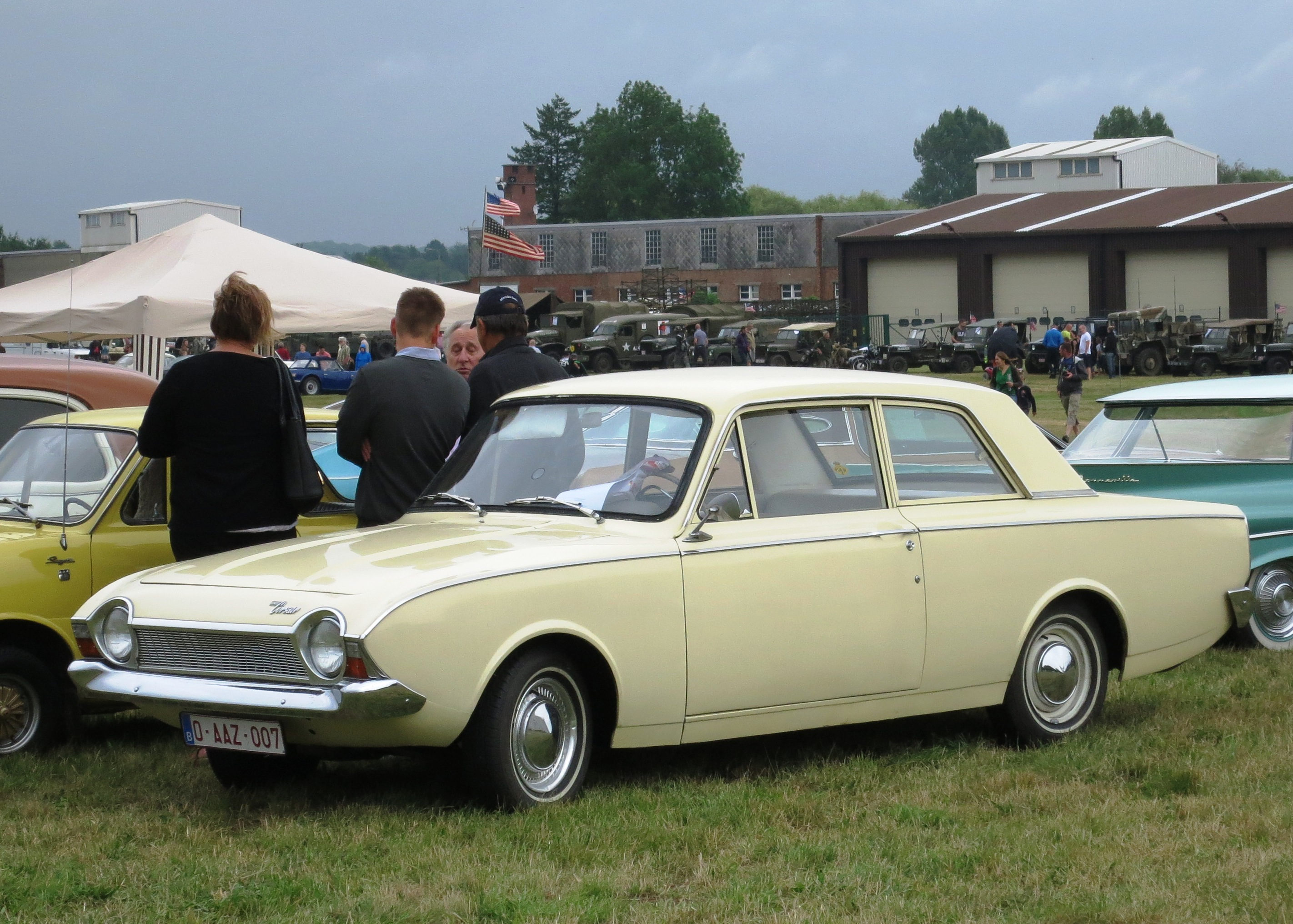
The 2-door Corsair was never a big seller on the home market.

The Corsair was designed by the same team as the Mark 1 Cortina, with Roy Brown Jr. overseeing the styling by Charles Thompson, and Fred Hart in charge of the engineering. Replacing the Consul Classic range, it was essentially a long wheelbase re-skinned Cortina with extra soundproofing and more comfortable seating for high speed long-distance driving. The windscreen and side windows are shared with the Cortina, the mechanical components with the Cortina GT, and the body's internal panels are basically similar. The Corsair had unusual and quite bold styling for its day, with a sharp horizontal V-shaped crease at the very front of the car into which round headlights were inset. This gave the car a relatively aerodynamic shape; the top speed of the Corsair 1500 was higher than the equivalent Cortina 1500 even though the Corsair was slightly larger and heavier. The jet-like styling extended to the rear where sharply pointed vertical light clusters hinted at fins, recalling the Ford Consul Mark 2. The overall styling theme was shared with the early 1960s Ford Thunderbird; both cars were inspired by Uwe Bahnsen's design for the 1960 Ford Taunus P3, but the Corsair was an economical medium-sized motorway cruiser with smooth light-weight bodywork, and very like the Taunus in concept.

In 1964 Tony Brookes, with his twin brother as one of the drivers, and a group of friends captured 15 International class G World endurance records at Monza in Italy with a Corsair 1500 GT. (Monza Yearbook 1965)

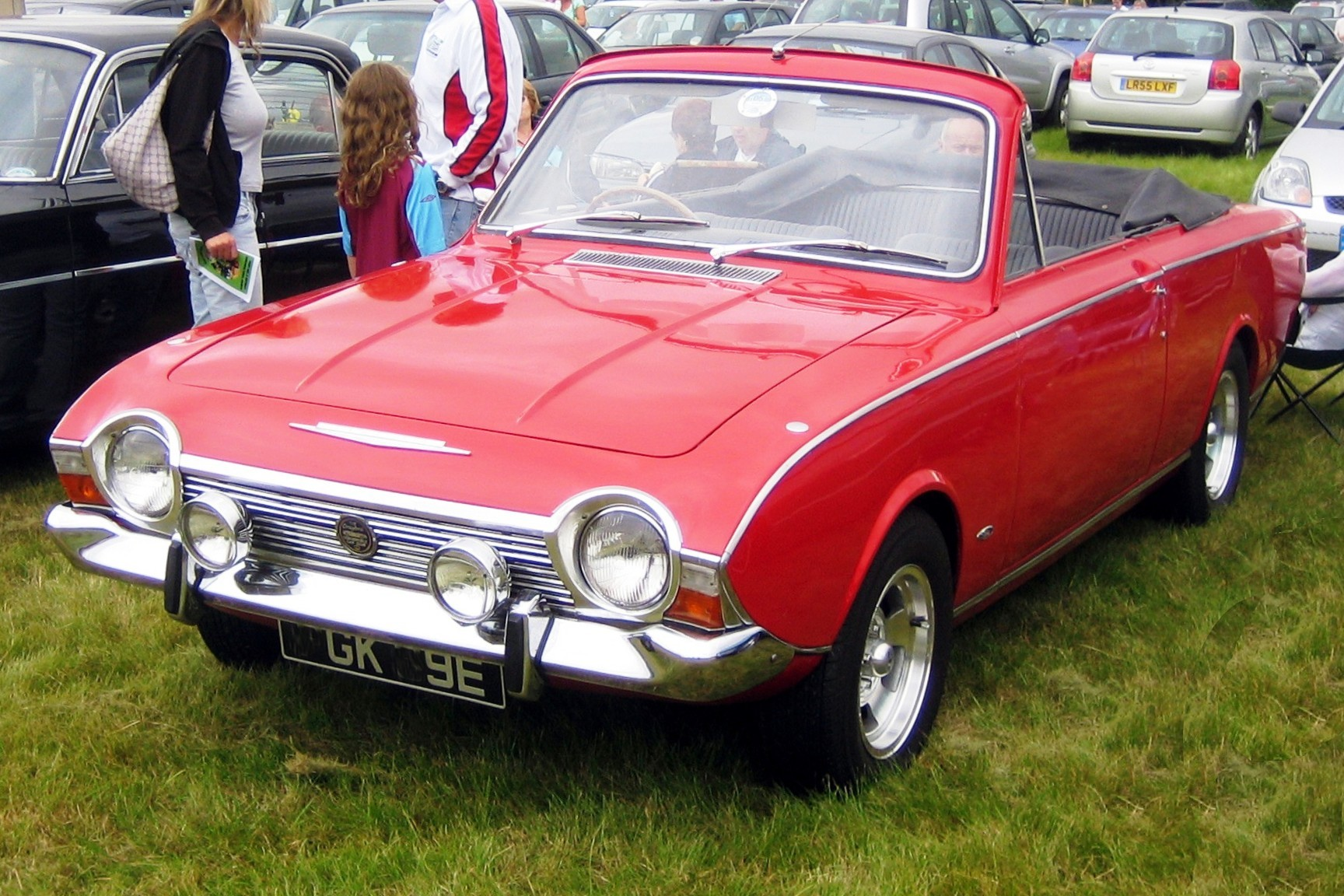
Ford Corsair V4 2-door convertible 1967. The Corsair convertible was a product of Crayford Auto Developments which was first exhibited at the London Motor Show in October 1966.

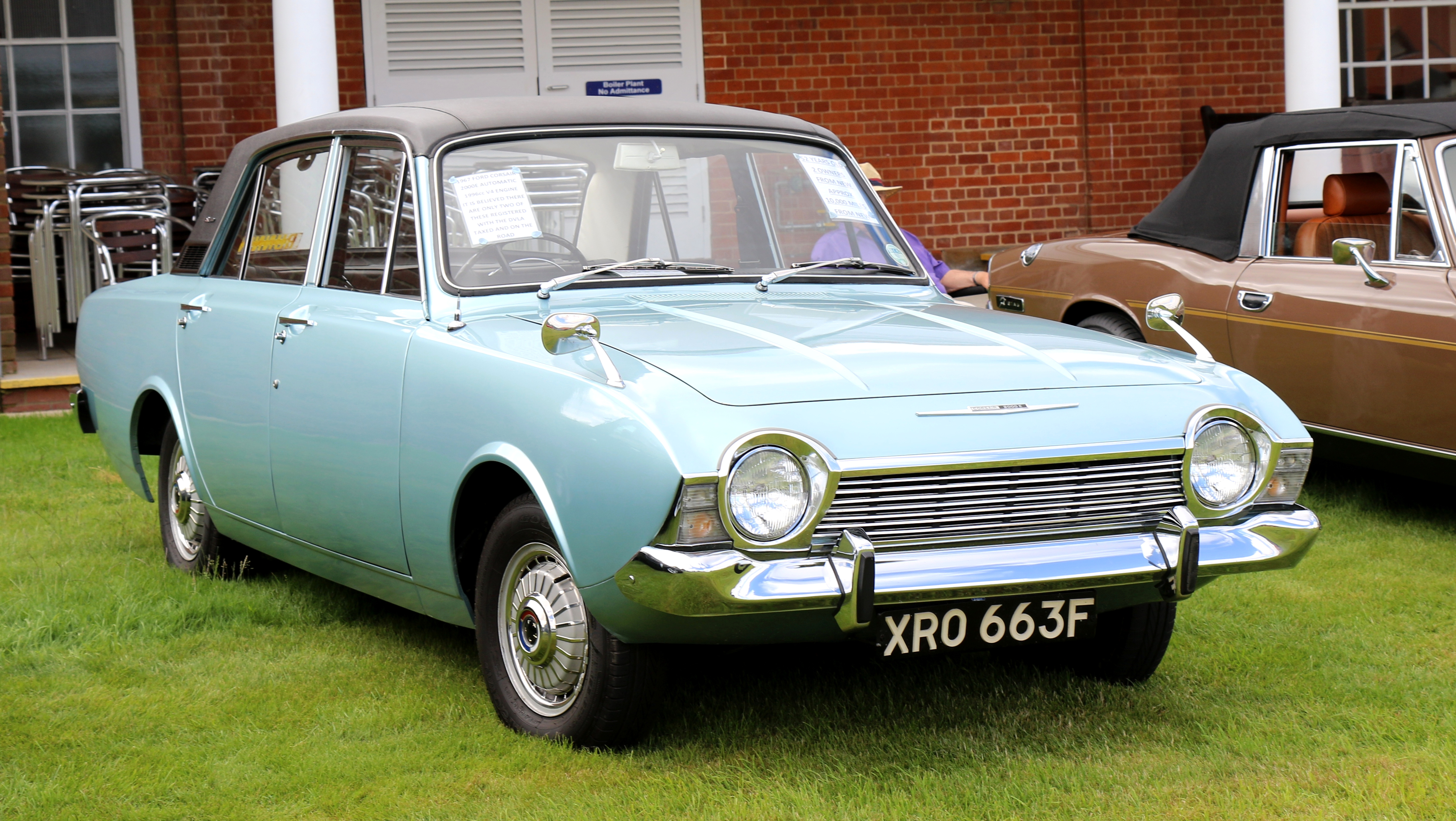
With the vinyl roofed Corsair 2000E, Ford attempted to compete on price half a class up in the category dominated (in the UK) by the Rover 2000 and Triumph 2000.

The Corsair Deluxe was initially offered with the larger 60 bhp (45 kW), single-carburettor, 1.5 L Kent engine that was also used in the smaller Cortina, and the Corsair GT came with the same 78 bhp (58 kW), 1.5-litre engine as the Cortina GT. The car received positive reviews from motoring journalists, with some reservations about the dash layout and the closeness of the steering wheel to the driver. Although the 1963-65 Corsair range outsold the Classic, the car was not a best-seller like the Cortina, but given the low development costs it was presumed to be profitable for Ford. The range was revised in September 1965, gaining a better dashboard and interior ventilation, but adopting new Ford Essex V4 engines which were rough at idle and coarse on the road. The Essex engine was made in 1.7 L (1,663 cc) capacity for the Corsair V4 Deluxe, and a 2.0-litre version with high fuel consumption and disappointing performance was installed in the Corsair V4 GT. One marketing tagline for the V4 models was "The Car That Is Seen But Not Heard", which was a real stretch of the ad man's puff, given the inherent characteristics of the engine. The other tag was "I've got a V in my bonnet". These V4 engined cars were poorly regarded by the public, and sales began to taper off. In January 1967 a much improved version of the 2.0 L engine was released, and in April 1967 the problematic V4 GT was replaced by the 2000E model. A 3.0-litre conversion using the Ford Essex V6 engine was one of the options available via Crayford Engineering.

Ford Corsair production data:

Consul Corsair 1500 (1963–1965)	Units
Corsair 1500 Standard 2 Door	355
Corsair 1500 Standard 4 Door	953
Corsair 1500 Deluxe 2 Door	33,352
Corsair 1500 Deluxe 4 Door	103,094
Corsair 1500 GT 2 Door	6,610
Corsair 1500 GT 4 Door	15,247
Total Corsair 1500 (1963–1965)	159,951

Corsair V4 (1965–1970)	Units
Corsair V4 Deluxe 2 Door	6,450
Corsair V4 Deluxe 4 Door	118,065
Corsair V4 GT 2 Door	1,534
Corsair V4 GT 4 Door	12,589
Corsair V4 2000E 4 Door	31,566
Corsair V4 Estate	899
Corsair V4 Estate 2000GT	40
Corsair V4 Estate 2000E	1
Total Corsair V4 (1965–1970)	171,144
Total Ford Corsair production	331,095

Two-door Corsairs were almost all LHD cars, destined for Europe/export.

An estate car by Abbott was added to the range on the eve of the Geneva Motor Show in March 1966, and in 1967, the Corsair underwent the Executive treatment like its smaller Cortina sibling, resulting in the 2000E model with dechromed flanks, which necessitated non-styled-in door handles, special wheel trims, reversing lights, a vinyl roof, and upgraded cabin fittings including a polished wood dashboard. The 2000E, priced at £1,008 in 1967, was positioned as a cut price alternative to the Rover 2000, the introduction of which had effectively defined a new market segment for four cylinder executive sedans in the UK three years earlier: the Corsair 2000E comfortably undercut the £1,357 Rover 2000 and the £1,047 Humber Sceptre.

A five-seater convertible and a four-seater cabriolet conversion were available via Crayford Engineering. Only 18 Cabriolets were built, using technology from the Karl Deutsch GmbH in Germany. Only four are known to survive.

The Corsair's performance was good for a car of its type and period, with a top speed in its later 2.0 L V4 version of 110 miles per hour (180 km/h) as measured by the speedometer, thanks to the progressive 28/36mm twin-choke Weber downdraught carburettor.

The Corsair was replaced by the Mk 3 Cortina in 1970, when the enlarged Cortina became Ford's midsized car, and a new smaller model, the Escort, had already filled in the size below. The new Ford Capri took on the performance and sporty aspirations of the company.

Over its six-year production, 310,000 Corsairs were built, of which about 600 are thought to survive in the UK as of 2019. Conversely, of the 200 convertibles built, around 75 have survived.

The Corsair was also manufactured by Ford in Ireland and South Africa. A small number of Corsairs were exported to Australia and New Zealand.

== Ford Corsair (UA, Australia) ==
Ford Corsair (UA)
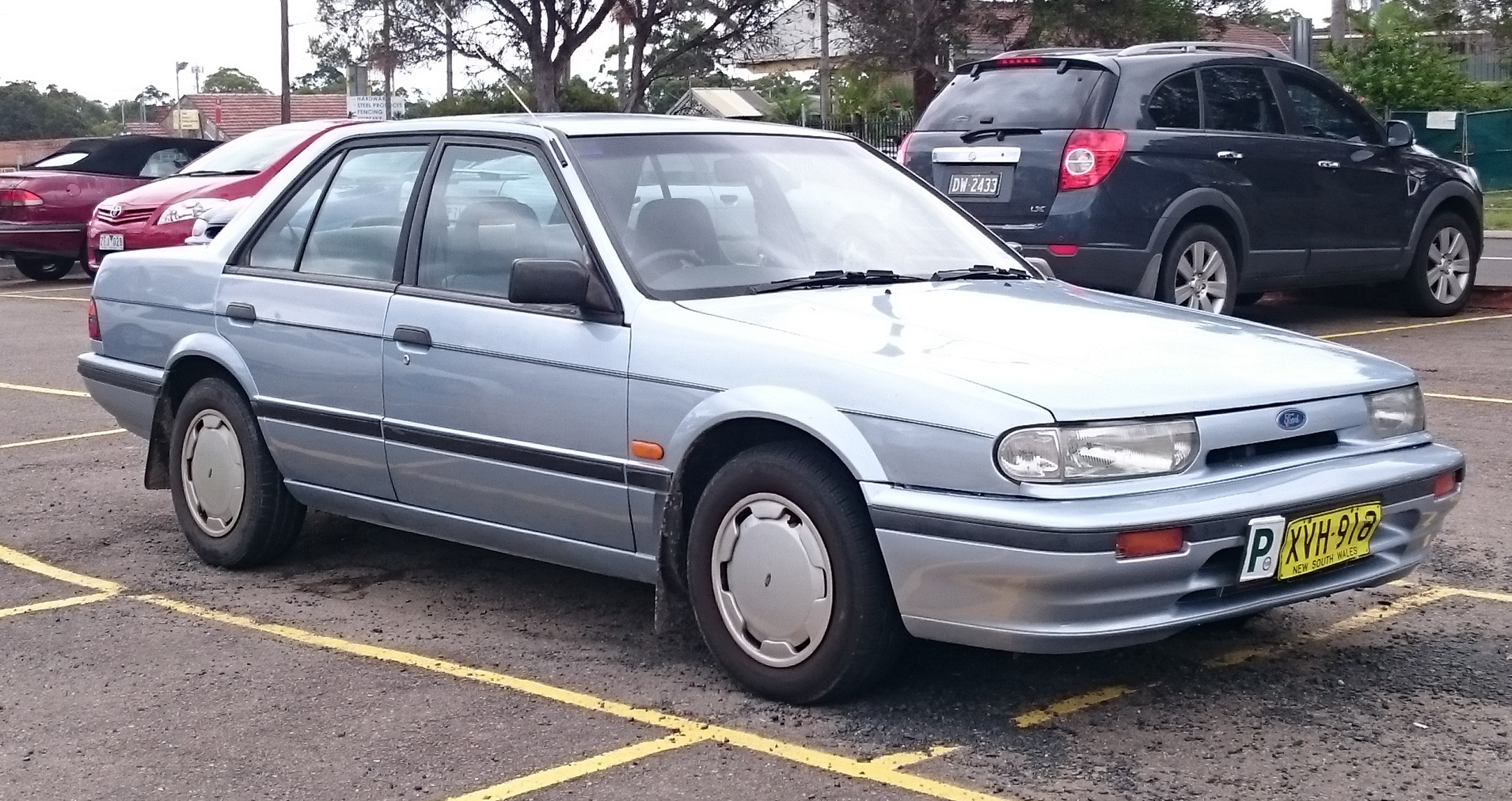
- Ford Corsair (UA) Ghia sedan

Overview
- Manufacturer: Nissan Australia
- Production: 1989–1992
- Assembly: Australia: Clayton

Body and chassis
- Class: Front-engine, front-wheel-drive
- Body style: 4-door saloon 5-door hatchback
- Layout: Front-engine, front-wheel-drive
- Related: Nissan Pintara (U12)

Powertrain
- Engine: 1,974 cc CA20E I4; 2,389 cc KA24E I4

Chronology
- Predecessor: Ford Telstar (AT/AV)
- Successor: Ford Telstar (AX/AY)

Between 1989 and 1992, the Ford Corsair name was used by Ford Australia for a badge-engineered version of the Nissan Pintara (a version of the Bluebird).

Known during development as 'Project Matilda', the Corsair was produced under a model-sharing scheme known as the Button Plan. It was offered as a four-door sedan and as a five-door liftback, in GL and Ghia trim levels with 2.0 L (CA20E) and 2.4 L (KA24E) four-cylinder engines.

The Corsair was intended to replace the Mazda 626-based Ford Telstar, which was imported from Japan. The two were sold side by side in the Australian Ford range, with the Telstar available only as the high-performance TX5 hatchback. However, it proved less popular than the Telstar had been, losing sales dramatically during 1991.

When Nissan closed its Australian plant in 1992, the Corsair was discontinued and the imported Telstar once again became Ford's main offering in the midsized segment, until being replaced by the Mondeo in 1995.

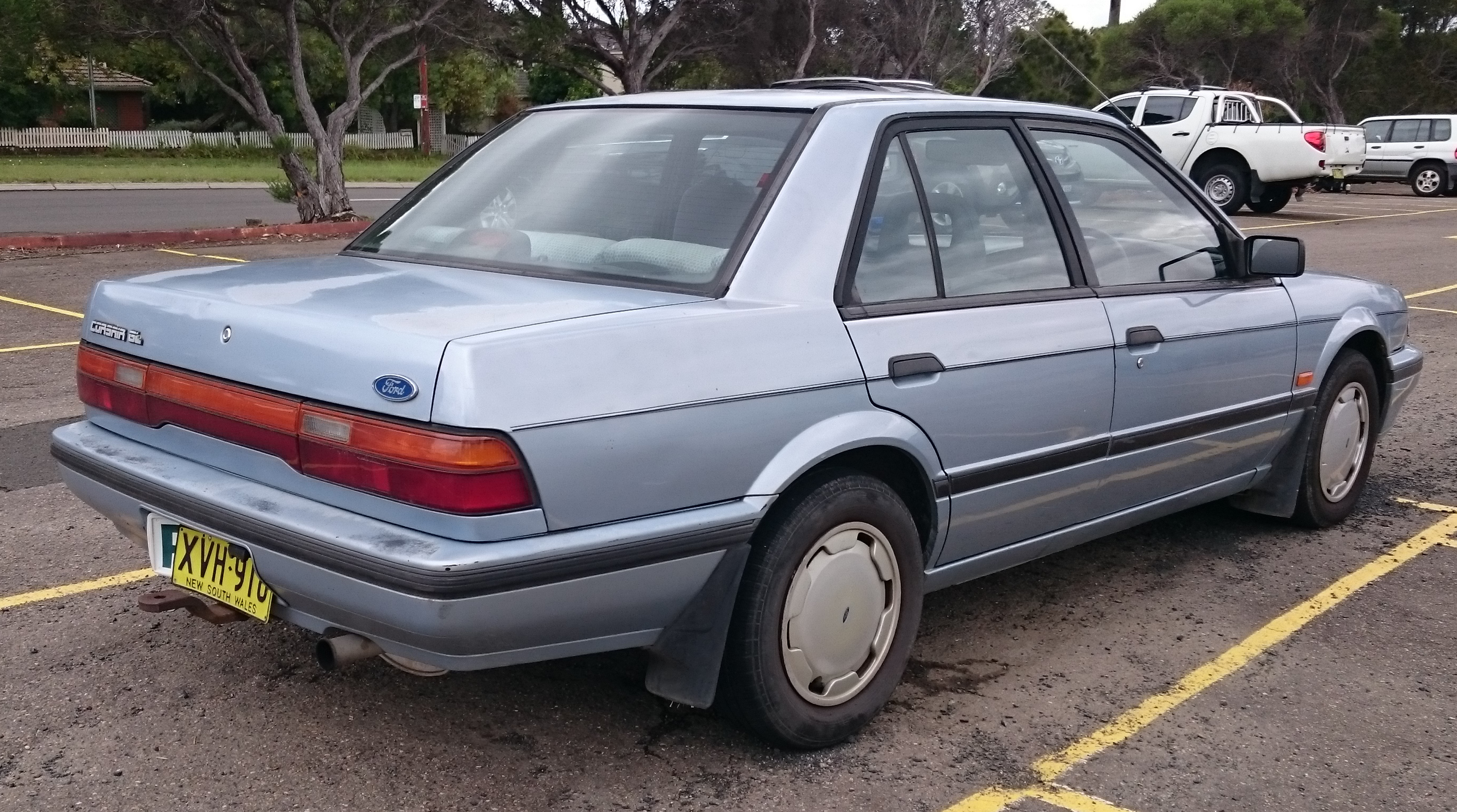
Sedan

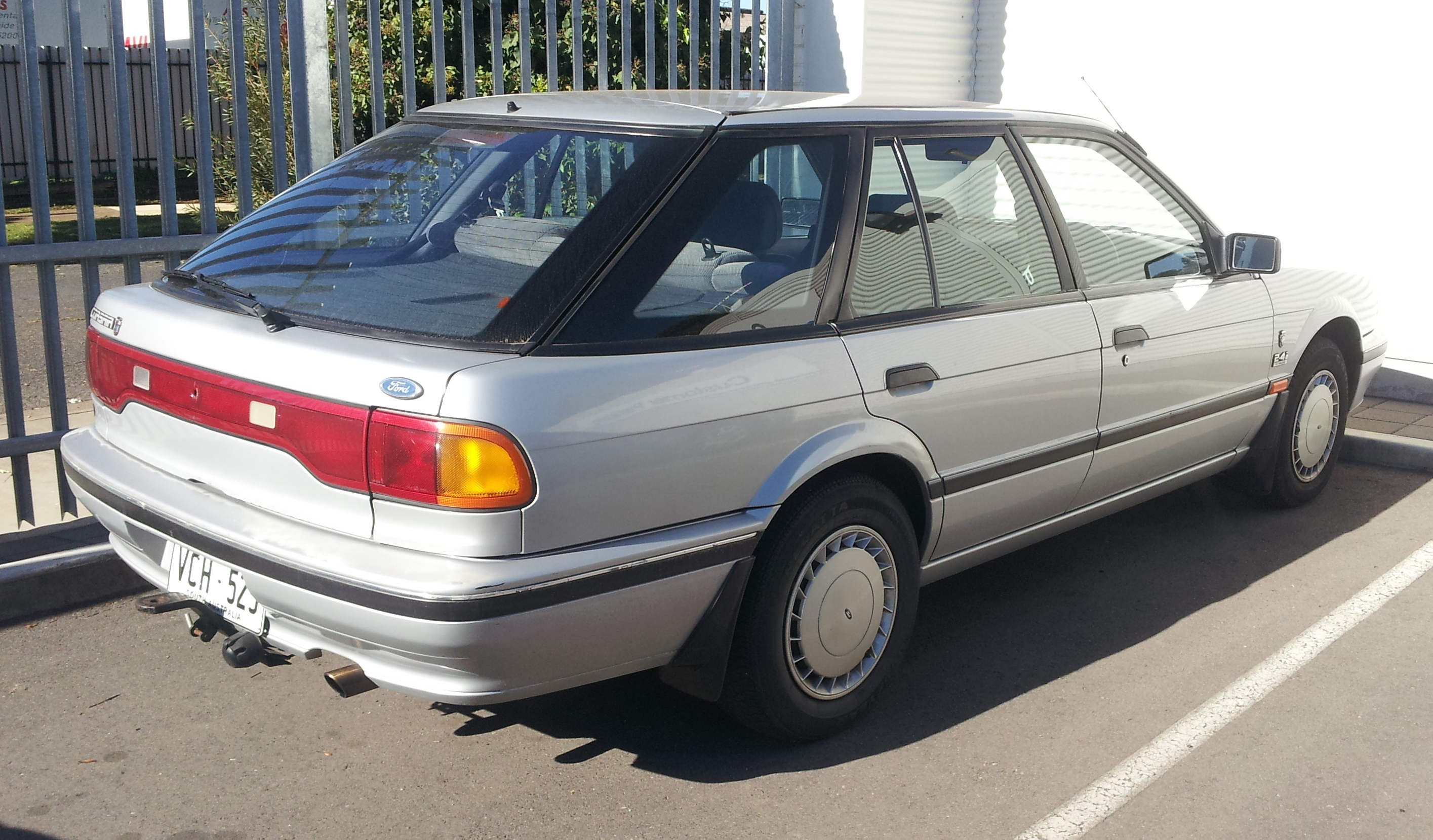
Hatchback

== Edsel Corsair ==
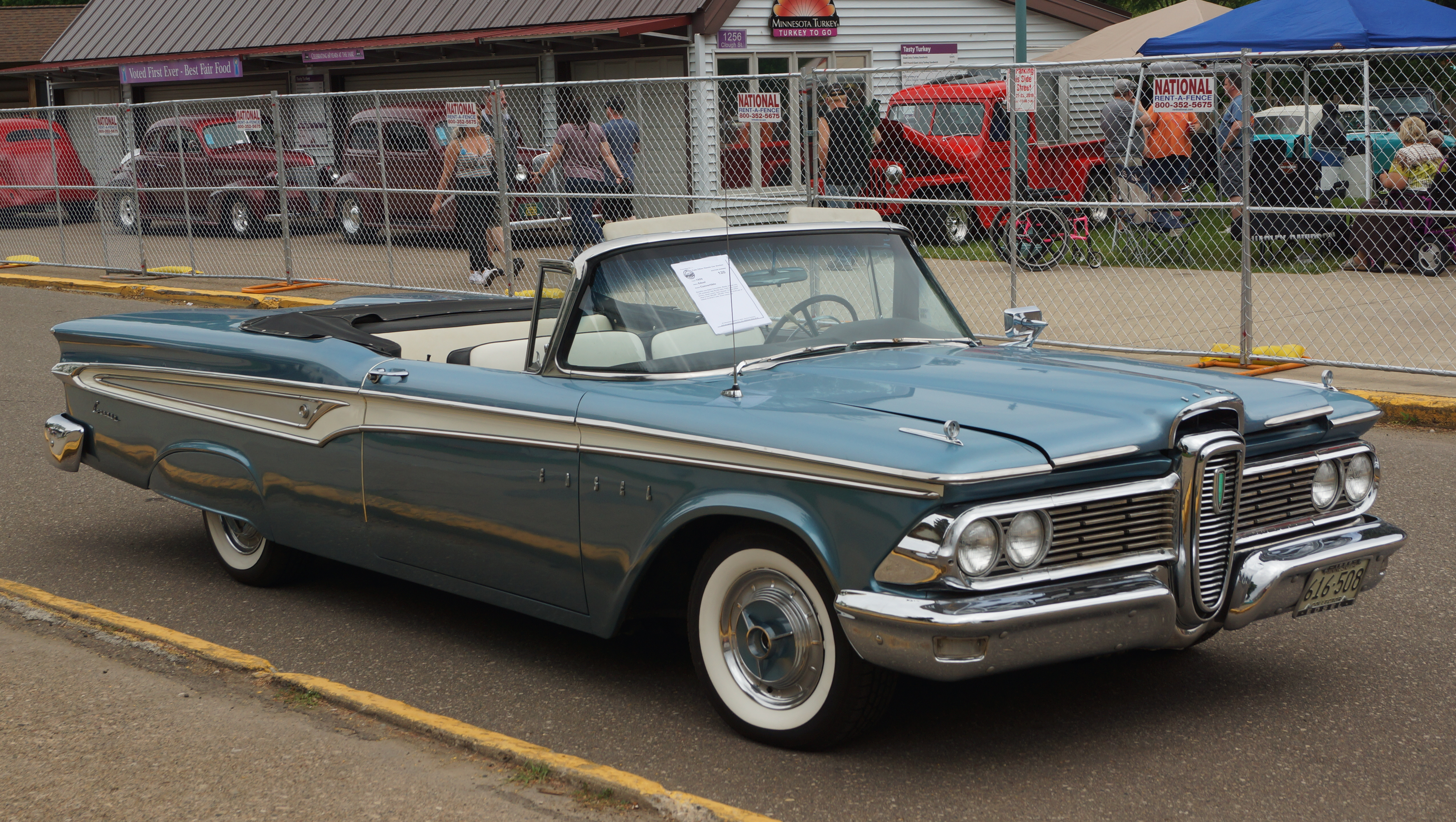
1959 Edsel Corsair Convertible

The unrelated Edsel Corsair was produced by the former Mercury-Edsel-Lincoln Division of the Ford Motor Company in the United States and sold under its Edsel marque in 1958 and 1959.
