= Ford Australia =

Australian automobile manufacturer

Ford Motor Company of Australia Pty Limited
- Type: Subsidiary
- Industry: Automotive
- Founded: 1925; 101 years ago
- Founder: Henry Ford
- Headquarters: Richmond, Victoria (Head Office); Broadmeadows Assembly Plant (Asia Pacific Engineering Centre)
- Key people: Fadi Mawal (president & CEO)
- Products: Automobiles; Performance vehicles; Commercial vehicles
- Number of employees: 1,800 (2023)
- Parent: Ford Motor Company
- Website: ford.com.au

Ford Motor Company of Australia Pty Limited (known by its trading name Ford Australia) is the Australian subsidiary of United States–based automaker Ford Motor Company. It was founded in 1925 as an Australian outpost of Ford Motor Company of Canada. At that time, Ford Canada was a separate company from Ford in the US. Henry Ford had granted the manufacturing rights of Ford motor vehicles in the British Empire (later the Commonwealth) to Canadian investors.

Ford Australia's first products were Model T cars assembled from complete knock-down (CKD) kits provided by Ford of Canada. Of the many models that followed, the best known was the Falcon produced from 1960 to 2016, originally a US model introduced in Australia in 1960 and eventually adapted to Australian requirements and road conditions.

== History ==
=== Early developments ===
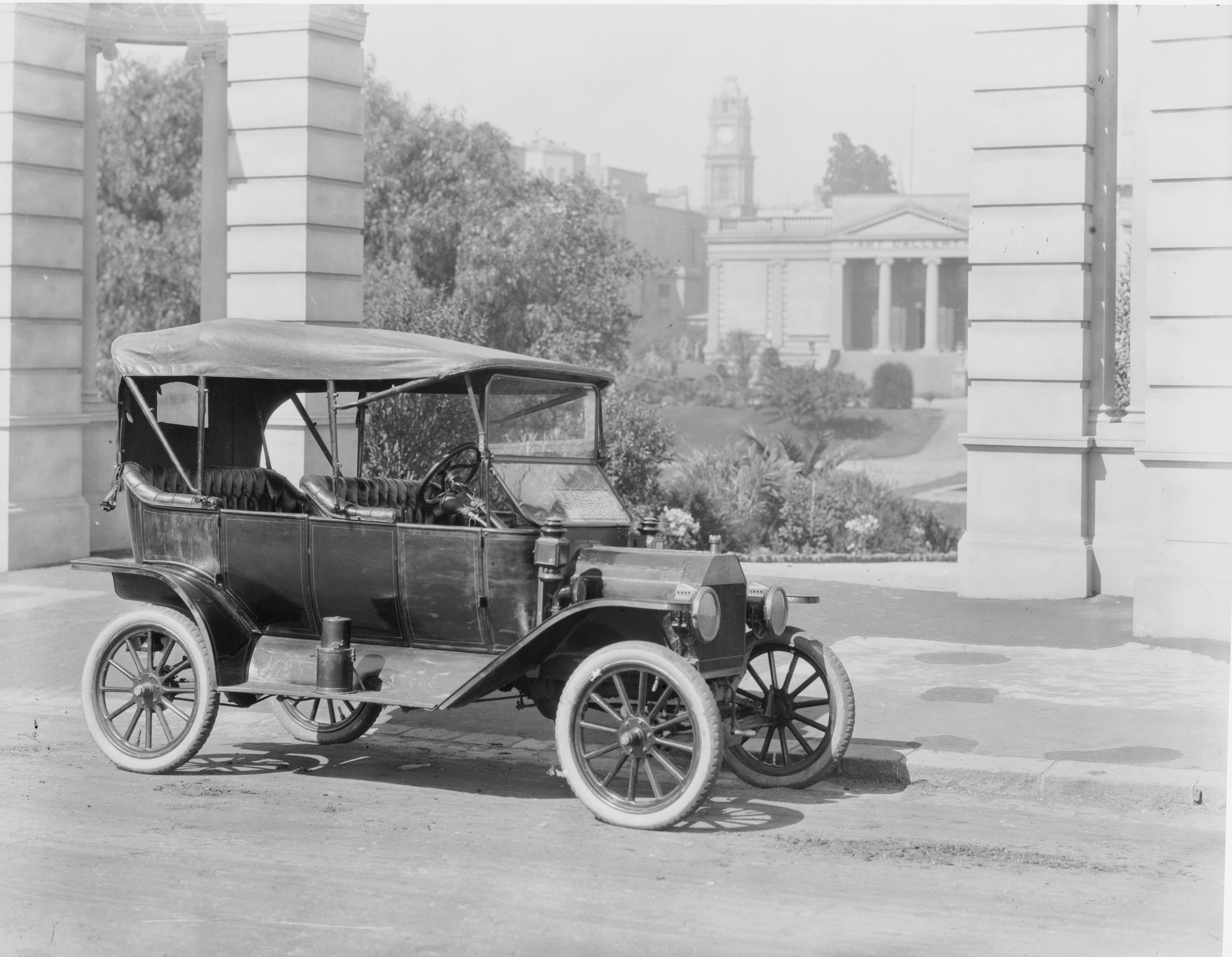
Ford Model T parked outside the Geelong Library at its launch in Australia in 1915

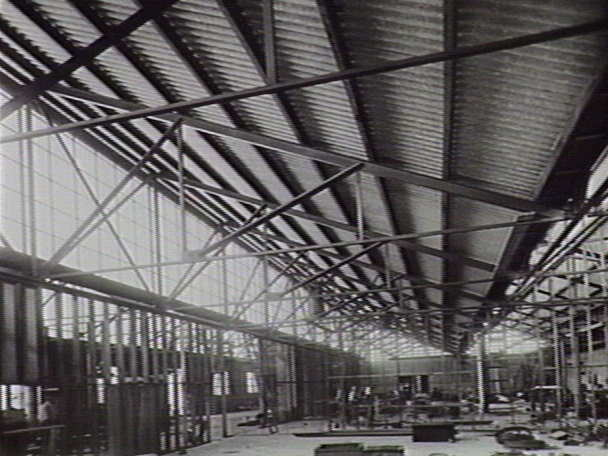
Ford Australia plant under construction in Geelong in 1926

On 31 March 1925, Ford announced that its Australian headquarters were to be at Geelong, Victoria. The first Ford Australia assembly plant opened at Geelong 1 July 1925, though no vehicles were manufactured that day, contrary to some accounts written decades later. The Ford Motor Company's newsletter noted on 15 July 1925 that "The first shipment of parts to the new corporation, consisting of 1,100 cars, is on the ocean due to arrive about August 1."

The improvised production line was in a disused Geelong wool storage warehouse while construction was in progress of a factory several miles away, in an area later renamed Norlane. During the construction of the Geelong plant, Holden's Motor Body Builders Ltd (now known as Holden) assembled and supplied vehicle bodies for Ford Australia In 1928, the factory switched to the Model A, which was followed in 1932 by the Ford V8.

In 1934, the company released a coupé utility based on the US Model A Ford "Closed Cab Pickup Truck" that had been produced for six years from 1928. The local designer was Ford engineer Louis (Lewis) Bandt. During the Great Depression, banks would not extend credit to farmers to purchase passenger cars, contending they were unnecessary luxuries. However, they would lend money for the purchase of "working" vehicles. The coupé utility fulfilled the need of farmers to have a workhorse which could also be used, as a well-known saying went: "to take the wife to church on Sunday and the pigs to the market on Monday".

In 1956, the company bought a large tract of land in the northern Melbourne suburb of Campbellfield to build the Broadmeadows Assembly Plant, and in July 1961 announced that the new Melbourne factory would become the company headquarters.

=== End of Australian production ===
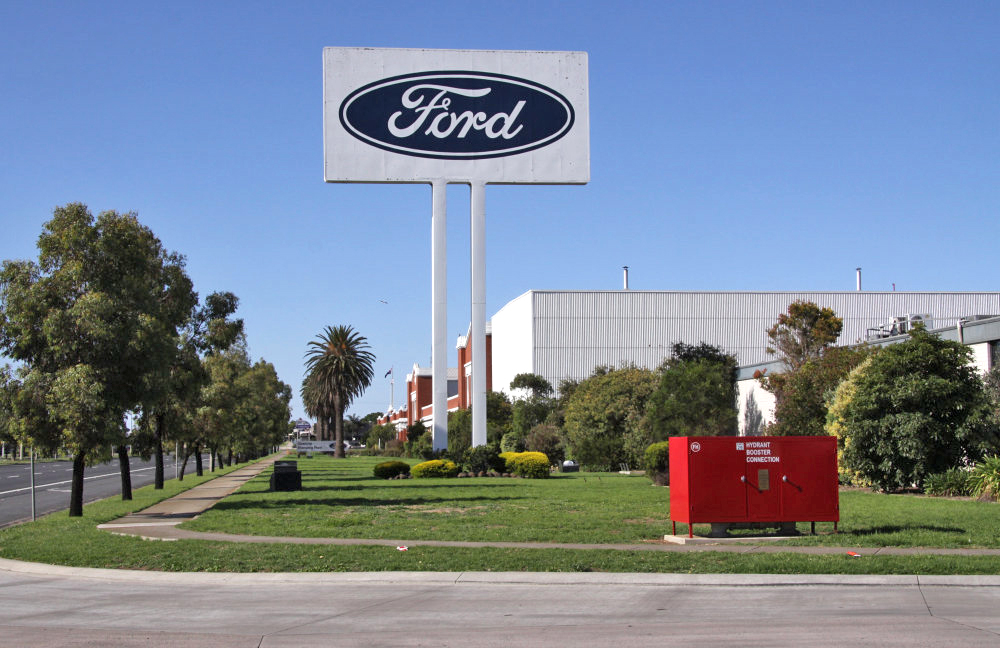
Ford Australia stamping plant in Geelong was closed in 2016.

In 2009, the parent Ford company, seeking to avoid the Chapter 11 bankruptcy that had already befallen General Motors and Chrysler, began abandoning overseas projects. By about July 2009, Ford Australia had received permission from Detroit to add a new small car to its Falcon production line. On 23 May 2013, Ford Australia announced that it would leave the Australian market after 88 years due to uncompetitive manufacturing costs and lacklustre sales. The carmaker's annual financial report, for the previous year, showed a loss of A$141 million (£90m/US$136m) after tax for the 2012 financial year. This followed a loss of A$290m in 2011 and a total loss of A$600m over the preceding five years. As a result, 1200 staff would lose their jobs.

Ford had two main factories, both in Victoria: located in the Geelong suburb of Norlane and the northern Melbourne suburb of Campbellfield. The Ford Discovery Centre, a museum of the history of the Ford Motor Company in Australia that was also located in Geelong, closed; the site was then occupied by Deakin University.

From 1972 to 2016, Ford Falcons were fully Australian designed. The company produced the Territory SUV, which also ended production in 2016. Production of the Falcon ended with the closure of the Broadmeadows (Campbellfield) and Geelong engine and panel stamping plants. The Geelong factory produced its last Australian-made straight-six and V8 engines on 26 September 2016. Assembly at Broadmeadows concluded on 7 October 2016, ending Ford's 88-year history in Australia.

Ford Australia was one of Ford's five product development centres globally. Since the end of factory operations in 2016, it fully imports cars and trucks for the Asia/Pacific region after the closure of its Australian operations. It was expected to retain about 1300 workers in Australia.

== Facilities ==
Ford Australia was also designated as one of five (worldwide) full-service Regional Product Development Centres, specifically for the Asia Pacific and African regions. Products launched so far include the Ford Ikon and Fiesta in India and the Ford Bantam ute and Ikon (a sedan version of the Fiesta) in South Africa, and has also developed the new Ranger.

On 24 January 2019, engineers and designers were among more than 100 workers to lose their jobs at Ford in Victoria. About 40 salaried workers, 75 hourly workers and 90 contractors across Ford bases in Broadmeadows, Lara and Geelong would be affected, the company confirmed, as the automaker further consolidated its operations. Ford's engineering work on its Ranger ute and other models "will be led out of the United States", the company said in a statement. Remaining Australian-based engineers would have a "strategic role" in developing a new medium-sized pick-up truck for Ford and the German brand, the automaker said.

== Models produced ==
Ford Australia started by assembling Model Ts. As Ford introduced new models, they were assembled in Australia. During World War II, Ford Australia ceased producing cars to commence military production to support the war effort.

After World War II, Ford recommenced assembly of imported Ford models. Initially, they assembled the UK sourced Pilot, then a range of British cars, including the Prefect, Anglia, Consul, Zephyr and Zodiac. Ford also assembled the Canadian Ford V8.

=== Hatchback ===
The Ford Laser was produced in Ford's plant at Flemington in Sydney, from 1981 until September 1994 when the plant closed, after which they were fully imported from Japan. The Laser was replaced by the Ford Focus in 2002. It is currently offered in sedan and hatchback variants with a 2.0L engine, which is one of the market leaders in sales. The Fiesta, a global Ford product, has also been offered between 2004 and 2022.

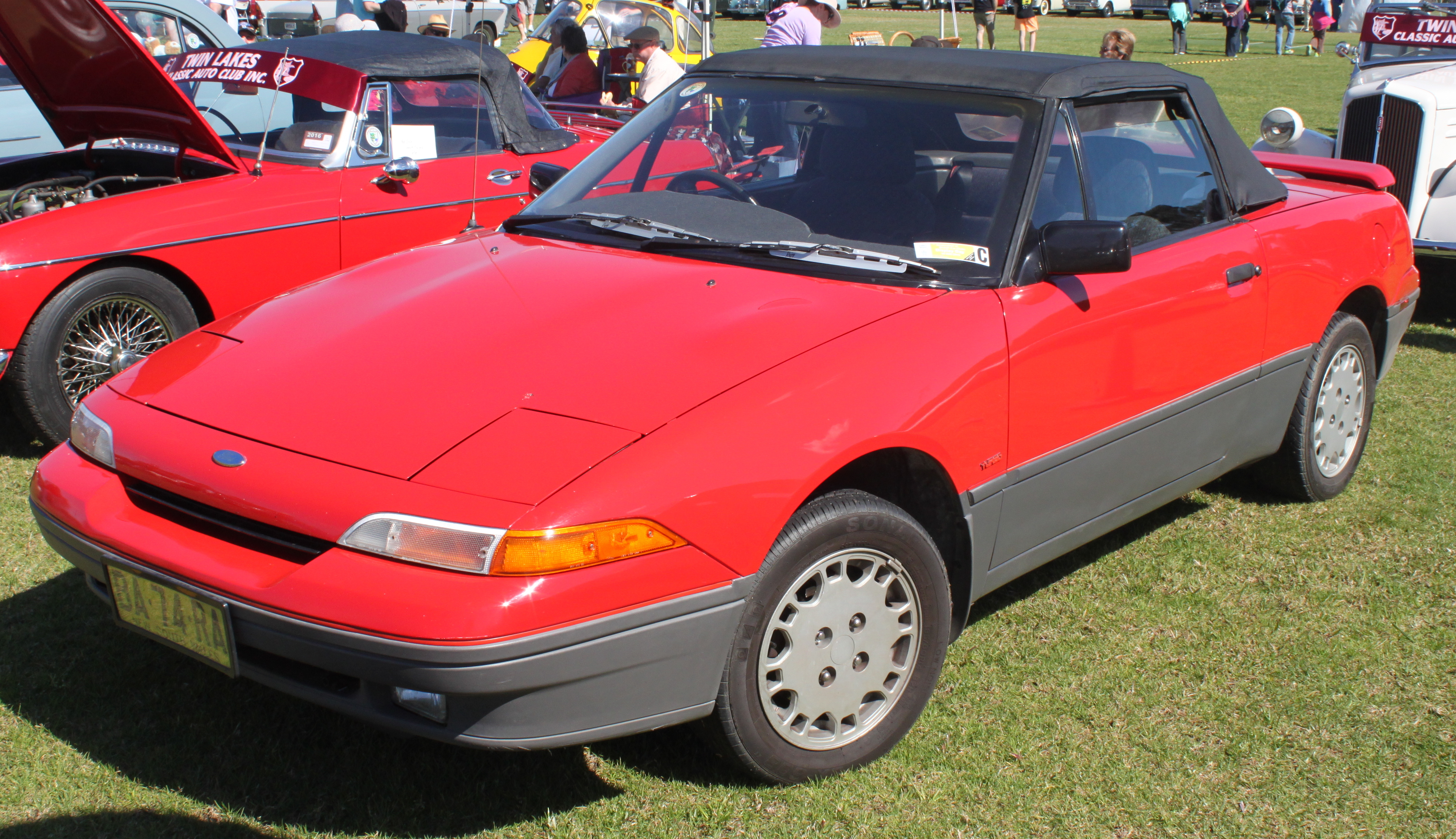
Ford Capri (1989–1994)

=== Mid-size ===
Mid-size cars formerly assembled in Australia included the Ford Cortina, Capri and Escort, from the UK. These were adapted for the Australian market: for example, from 1972, the Cortina was available with the option of either a 3.3-litre or 4.1-litre six-cylinder engine, and the Escort could be offered across the range with the Cortina's 2.0-litre motor. In 1977, lack of capacity required the Cortina wagon to be assembled in Renault's (now long since closed) Australian factory in Heidelberg, Victoria.

The Cortina's replacement, the Mazda 626-based Telstar, was initially assembled in Australia. In 1989 the Telstar sedan was replaced by the locally assembled Ford Corsair which was essentially a rebadged Nissan Pintara. When Nissan shut down its Australian manufacturing operations in 1992 the Telstar nameplate was reintroduced, and as before it was a rebadged and respecced Mazda 626. In 1995 the Telstar was dropped in favour of the Mondeo, imported from Belgium.

Ford Australia dropped the Mondeo in 2001, arguing at the time that the segment of the market in which it competed was in decline, but in 2007, it announced that it would introduce the new Mk IV model in Australia.

=== Large car ===
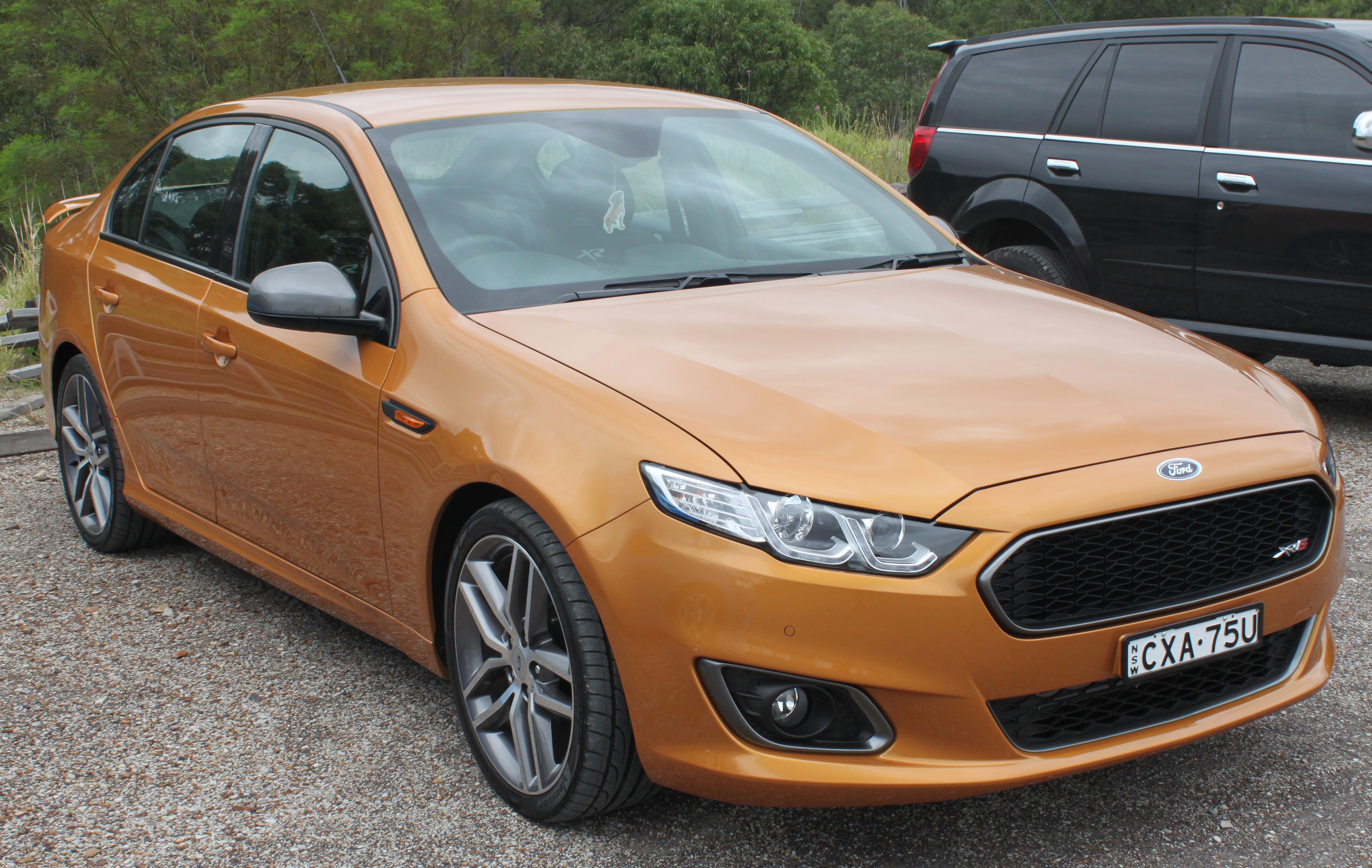
Ford Falcon (1960–2016)

The Ford Falcon was manufactured in Australia to a North American design, with the first model rolling off the production line at Ford's Broadmeadows plant on 28 June 1960. It differed little from the American design apart from conversion to right hand drive, and the Falcon soon proved unable to cope on harsh Australian roads, sparking a major effort to introduce improvements to its reliability. By the mid-1960s, the car was substantially different from its North American cousin and was offered in sedan, wagon, coupé, utility and panel van styles.

Production of the North American Falcon, on which the Falcon was by then loosely based, ended in 1970, obliging Ford Australia to pursue its design independently. The first true all-Australian Ford Falcon was launched as the XA model in June 1972. The XD and XE generation Falcons (1979-1984) followed the styling trends of Ford Europe's Granada II model, but were still purely an Australian design from an engineering standpoint and had virtually no parts commonality with the European product.

The Falcon had been an Australian "automotive icon" for most of its 56 years in production, playing a prominent part in Australian popular culture and motor racing. Falcons have served as taxis, police cars, family runabouts, and transport for tradespeople. They have been winners many times in the Australian Touring Car Championship and at the annual Bathurst 1000 touring car race, where the Falcon's reputation for engineering excellence was cemented by the early 1970s through the Falcon GT and GTHO "muscle car" variants.

Ford manufactured more than four million units between 1960 and 2016, and topped sales charts on many occasions. By 2016 the Falcon line-up was offered only in sedan and utility body styles; in the past, panel vans, station wagons and hardtops had been offered. Falcons had been prominent as taxis in Australia and New Zealand, along with sister car, the Ford Fairlane. Performance variants of the Falcon were used extensively for pursuit work for many years.

=== Luxury car ===
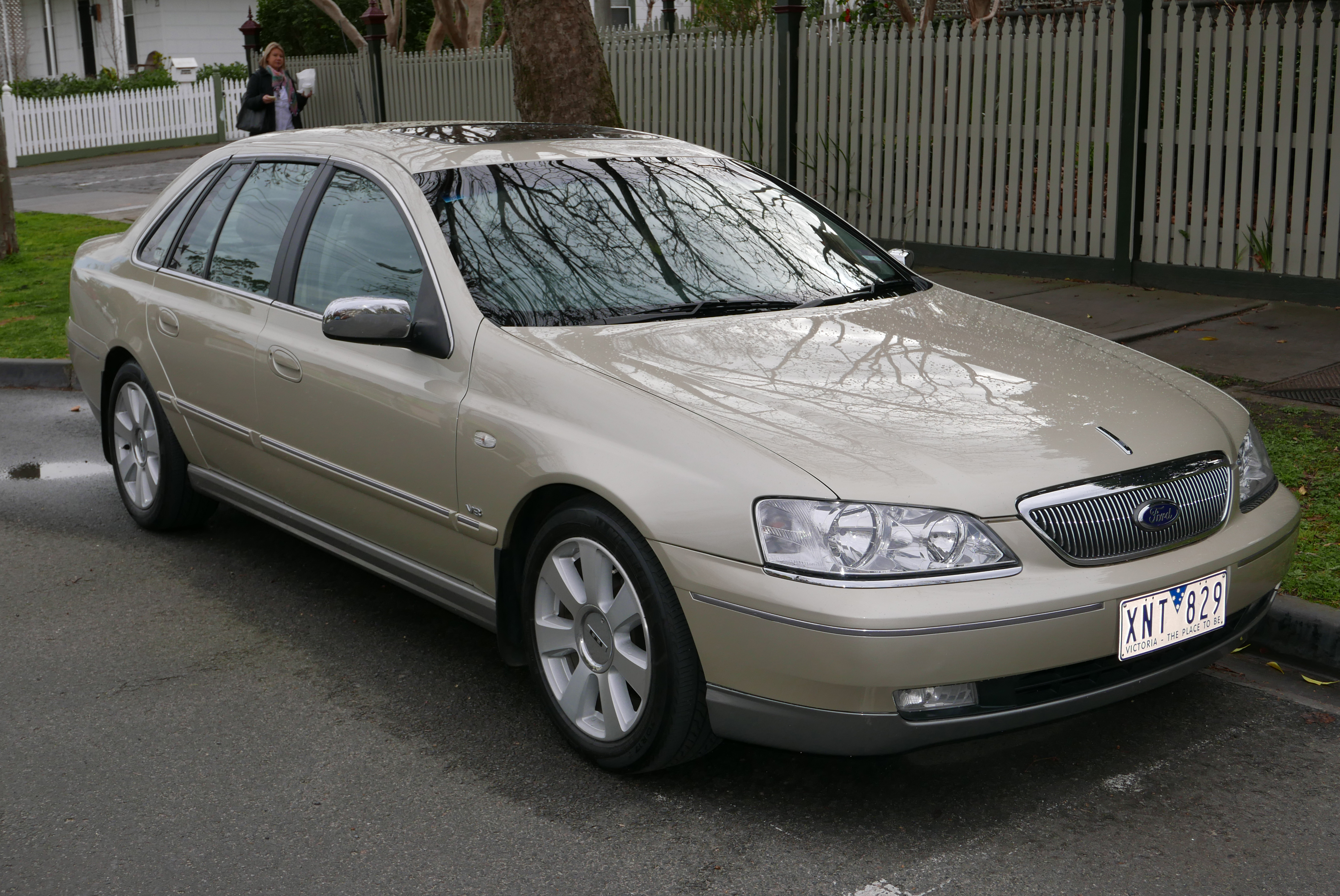
Ford Fairlane (1959–2007)

Ford Australia produced a range of full-size luxury cars alongside the Falcon for most of its production history. These models were named the Fairlane and the LTD. The first Fairlane, released in 1959, was an Australian-assembled version of the US Fairlane. Assembly of US cars continued until 1967, when Ford Australia designed its own luxury car, the ZA Fairlane. Heavily based on the existing XR Falcon, it had an extended wheelbase, longer boot and modest styling changes.

Ford Fairlanes were often preferred vehicles among politicians and businessmen. In 1972 a new model – the LTD – joined the second generation of Fairlanes the LTD. It was in effect a Fairlane with more features such as retractable headlights, a vinyl roof and an even longer wheelbase. From the third generation of Fairlane onwards, the LTD shared the same wheelbase and body as the Fairlane, being marketed as a more luxurious version of the Fairlane rather than being a completely different car.

The Fairlane topped Australian luxury car sales for two decades before its gradual downfall started in the late 1980s with the rising importation of European models such as BMW and Mercedes Benz. By the turn of the millennium, the Fairlane had been overtaken by the Holden Statesman in sales. In 2007, Ford Australia announced it would be cancelling further production of the Fairlane and LTD beyond the 2007 model year, citing falling sales and an uncertain future in the full-size luxury market. With the backing of large-volume exports to overseas markets, the Holden Statesman and Caprice then became the sole full-size extended wheelbase luxury models until their demise in 2017.

=== SUV ===
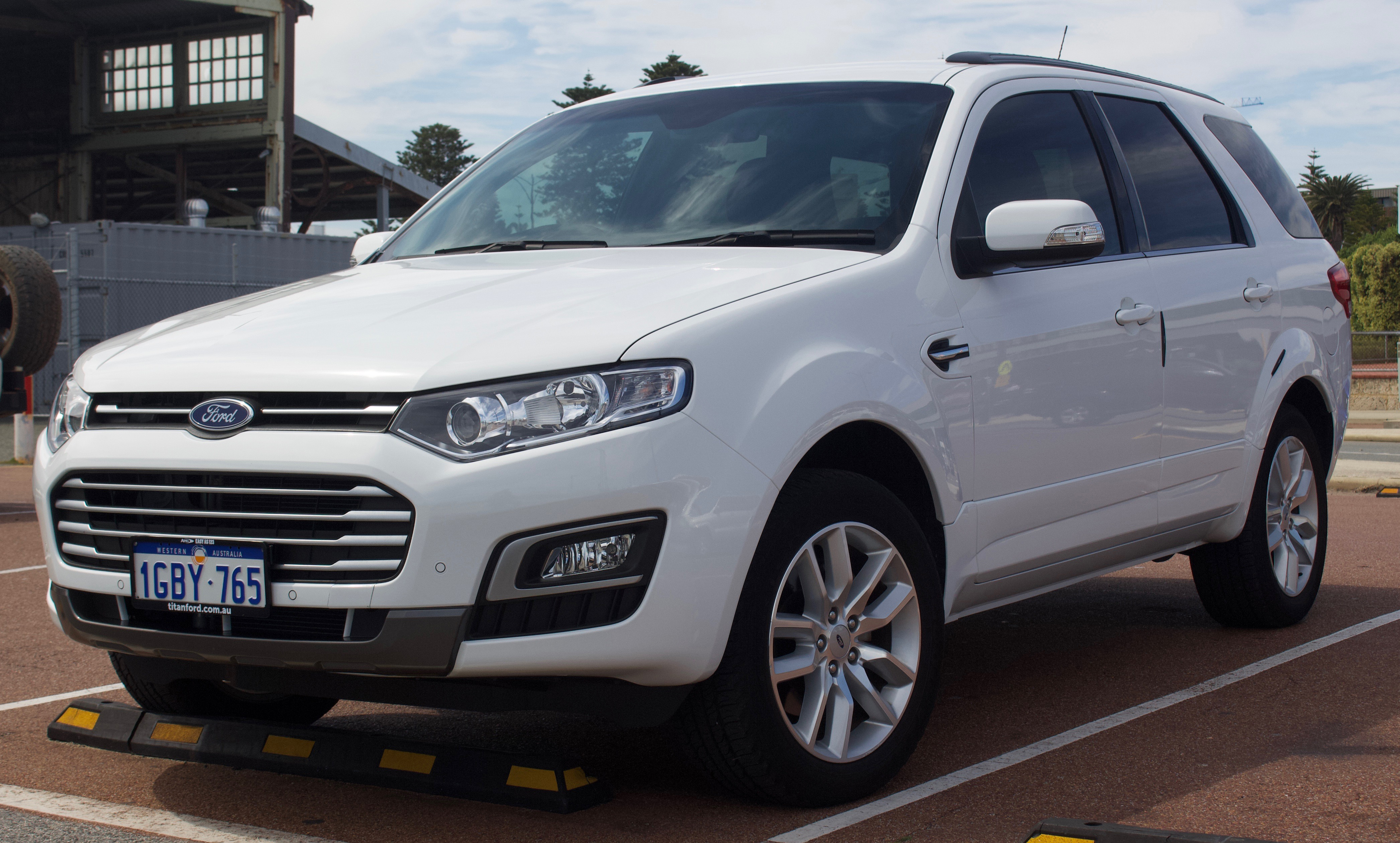
Ford Territory (2004–2016)

Between 2004 and 2016, the Ford Territory had been built on the same production line as the Falcon. The Territory (technically a crossover) had regularly been the most popular SUV in Australia.

== Vehicle range ==
=== Current vehicle range ===
As of 10 February 2024

- Ford Mustang
- Ford Mustang Mach-E
- Ford Everest
- Ford Ranger
- Ford F-150
- Ford Tourneo
- Ford Transit Custom
- Ford Transit

=== Former vehicle range ===
- Ford Pilot (1949–1951)
- Ford Mainline (1952–1959)
- Ford Customline (1952–1959)
- Ford Prefect (1939–1961)
- Ford Custom (1949–1962)
- Ford Zephyr (1951–1962)
- Ford Consul (1956–1962)
- Ford Anglia (1939–1967)
- Ford Galaxie (1964–1972)
- Ford Landau (1973–1976)
- Ford Escort (1970–1981)
- Ford Cortina (1964–1982)
- Ford Meteor (1981–1987)
- Ford Bronco (1981–1987)
- Ford Corsair (1989–1992)
- Ford Capri (1969–1972, 1989–1994)
- Ford Telstar (1982–1994)
- Ford Maverick (1988–1994)
- Ford Raider (1991-1997)
- Ford Probe (1994–1997)
- Ford Taurus (1996–1998)
- Ford Festiva (1991–2000)
- Ford Laser (1981–2002)
- Ford Cougar (1999–2002)
- Ford Ka (1999–2003)
- Ford Econovan (1980–2004)
- Ford Explorer (1996–2005)
- Ford Courier (1973–2007)
- Ford Fairlane (1967–2007)
- Ford Territory (2004–2016)
- Ford Falcon (1960–2016)
- Ford Endura (2018–2020)
- Ford Ecosport (2013–2020)
- Ford Mondeo (1995–2000, 2007–2020)
- Ford Focus (2003–2022)
- Ford Fiesta (2004–2022)
- Ford Escape (2001–2023)

== Sponsorships ==
Ford Australia is a major sponsor of the Geelong Football Club. The sponsorship agreement was first signed in 1925, making it the longest sporting sponsorship in the world.

In August 2023, Ford Australia announced a major partnership with Basketball Australia. As part of the multi-year deal, the Ford logo will feature on the jerseys of the Australia men's national basketball team and the Australia women's national basketball team.

In 1962, a sponsorship deal of Latrobe Valley Soccer League club IASCOG saw them renamed as the Morwell Falcons, in honour of the newly launched car of the same name. In the subsequent decades, the Falcons – who have retained the iconic moniker to this day – completed a remarkable rise, becoming the only Australian club to rise from a regional league to the top-tier National Soccer League.

Ford Australia also sponsor the Queensland State Of Origin team in Rugby League.

Ford Australia is a partner of Deakin University, funding the Ford Australia Women in STEAM Scholarship.
