= Nissan Pintara =

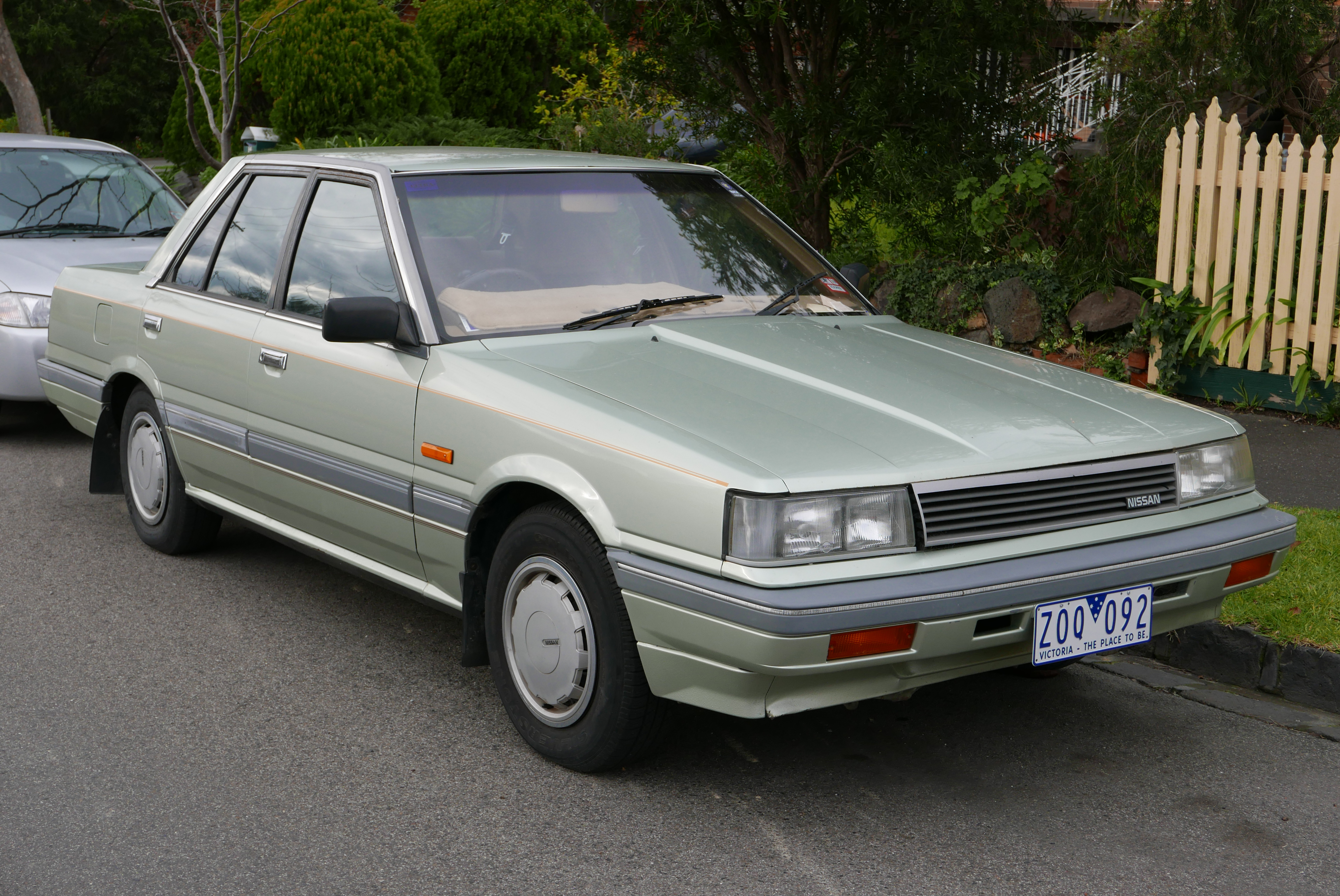
- Nissan Pintara (R31) GXE sedan

Overview
- Manufacturer: Nissan Motor Australia
- Production: 1986–1992
- Assembly: Australia: Clayton, Victoria

Body and chassis
- Class: Compact

The Nissan Pintara is a compact automobile that was manufactured by Nissan Motor Australia from 1986 to 1992.

== First generation (R31; 1986–1990) ==
R31
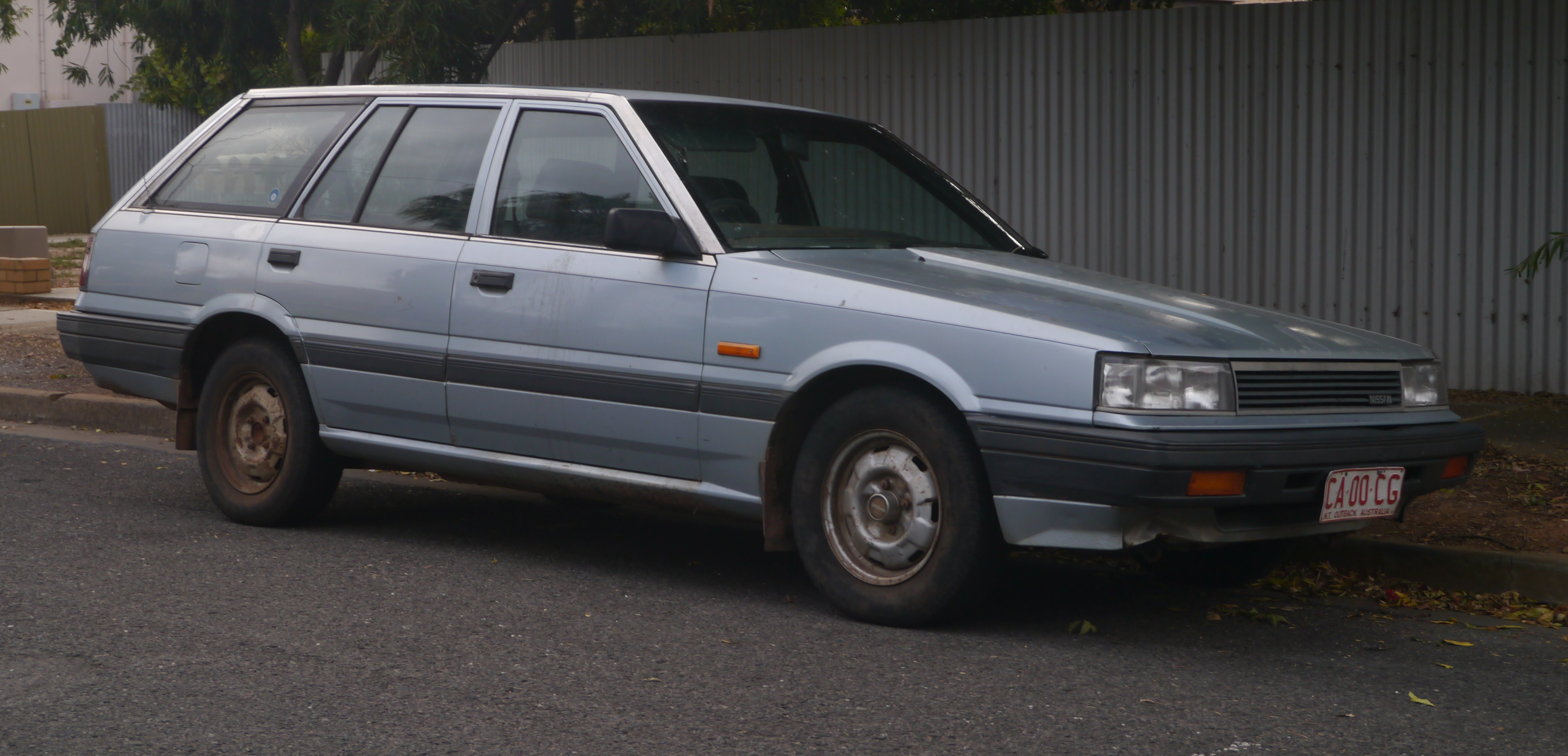
- 1989 Nissan Pintara GLi Wagon (R31 S3)

Overview
- Production: 1986–1989 (sedan); 1986–1990 (wagon)

Body and chassis
- Body style: 4-door sedan 5-door station wagon
- Layout: Front-engine, rear-wheel-drive
- Related: Nissan Skyline (R31)

Powertrain
- Engine: 2.0 L CA20E I4

The first generation R31 Nissan Pintara is a compact family car which was built by Nissan Australia at its Clayton, Victoria assembly plant in Melbourne from mid-1986. It was based on the Nissan Skyline. Powered by a single overhead camshaft fuel-injected 2.0-litre four-cylinder engine, it was intended to compete with the Mitsubishi Magna. Like the Australian-built six cylinder R31 Skyline, it was offered in sedan and station wagon form.

Four specification levels of the R31 Pintara were offered: GLi, Executive, GX, and GXE. A TRX bodykit package was offered for the GX and GXE sedans, featuring a front and rear air dam, rear spoiler, side skirts, grille cover, alloy wheels and low profile tyres. Unlike the later U12 TRX, this did not feature any mechanical upgrades.

The sole engine was a 2.0-litre CA20E inline-four, producing 78 kW (105 hp) (DIN) at 5200 rpm and 160 N⋅m (118 lbf⋅ft) (DIN) at 3200 rpm. This unit was SOHC, multi-point fuel injected featuring electronic concentrated control system (ECCS) including electronic ignition. It featured two spark plugs per cylinder to help meet emission requirements.

This engine was previously seen in the (sportier) Nissan Gazelle and was a particularly high revving engine for a car of this type.

Rather than build the U11 Bluebird, Nissan Australia had chosen to go the route of building a localised four-cylinder Skyline, because of the Bluebird's switch to front-wheel drive with the U11. Nissan Australia had feared that the new front-wheel drive design would not resonate well with the Australian consumer, as the Australian market was well acclimated to rear-wheel drive at the time.

For this reason, rival Toyota had continued to produce the rear-wheel drive T140 Corona up to 1987 for the Australian market, despite most other markets receiving the front-wheel-drive T150. The reality of marketing a front-wheel drive Bluebird in the Australian market would come into fruition with the succeeding U12 model.

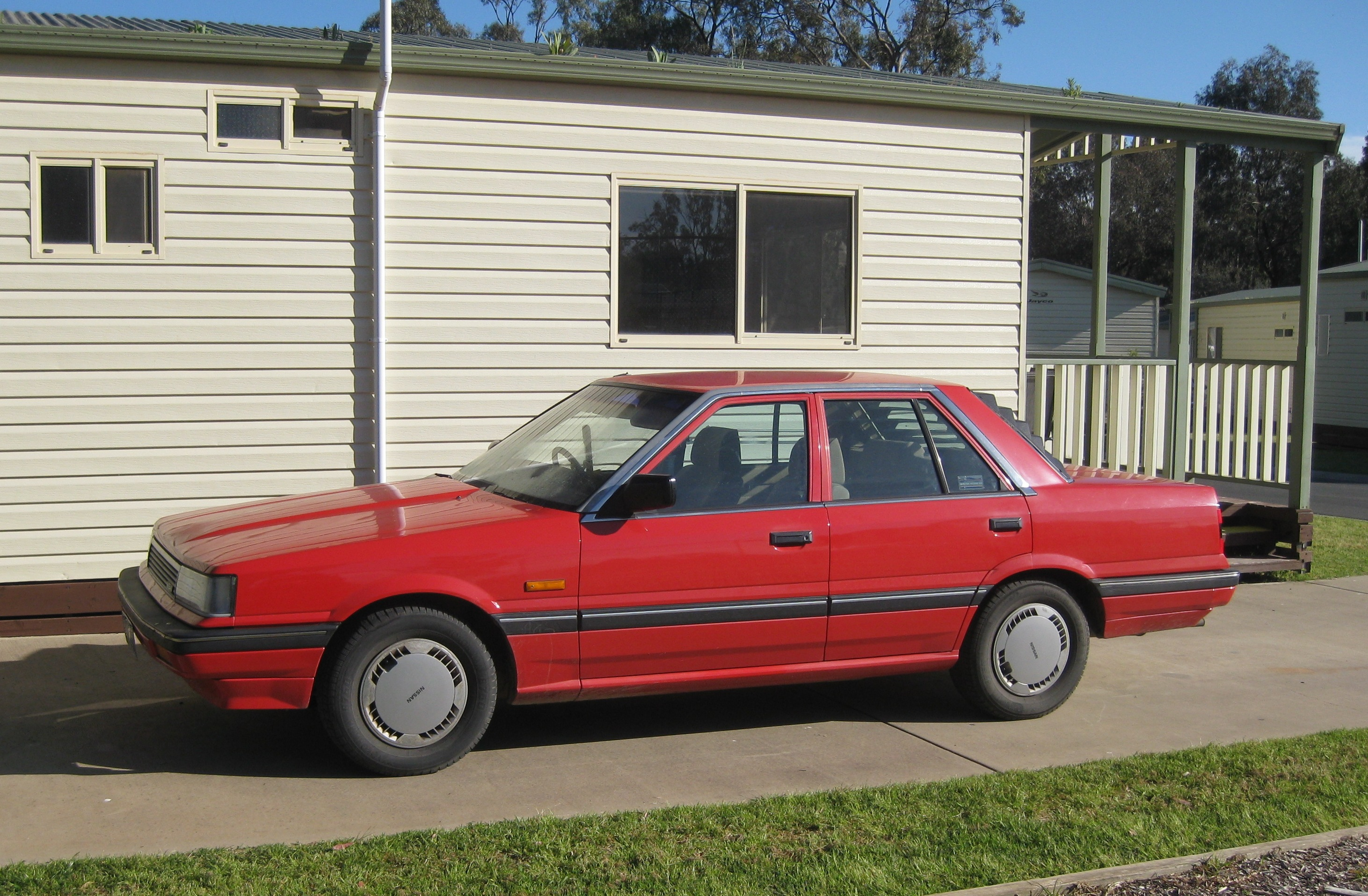
1986 Nissan Pintara GX Sedan (R31)

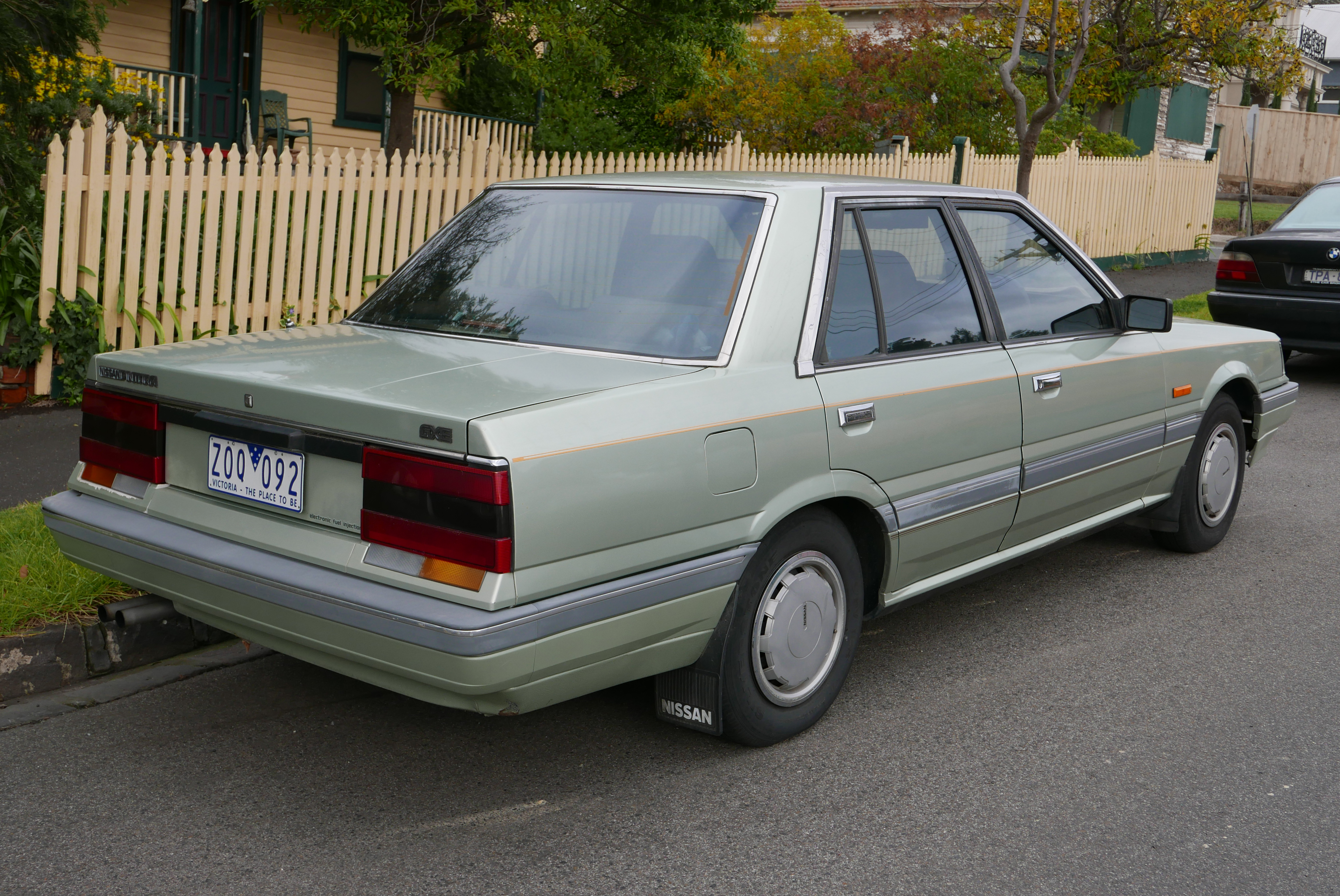
1986 Nissan Pintara GXE Sedan (R31)

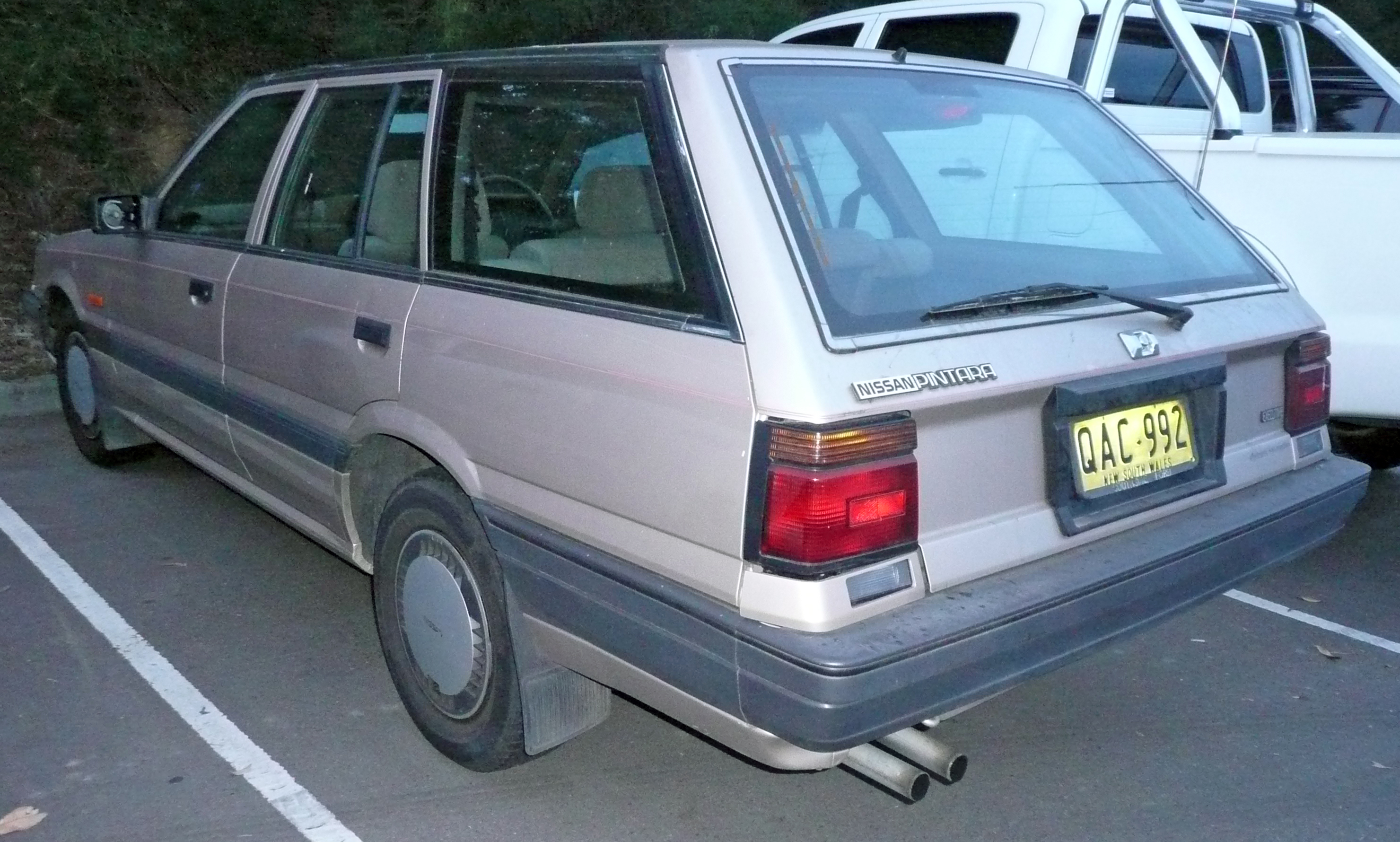
1989–1990 Nissan Pintara Executive Wagon (R31)

== Second generation (U12; 1989–1992) ==
U12
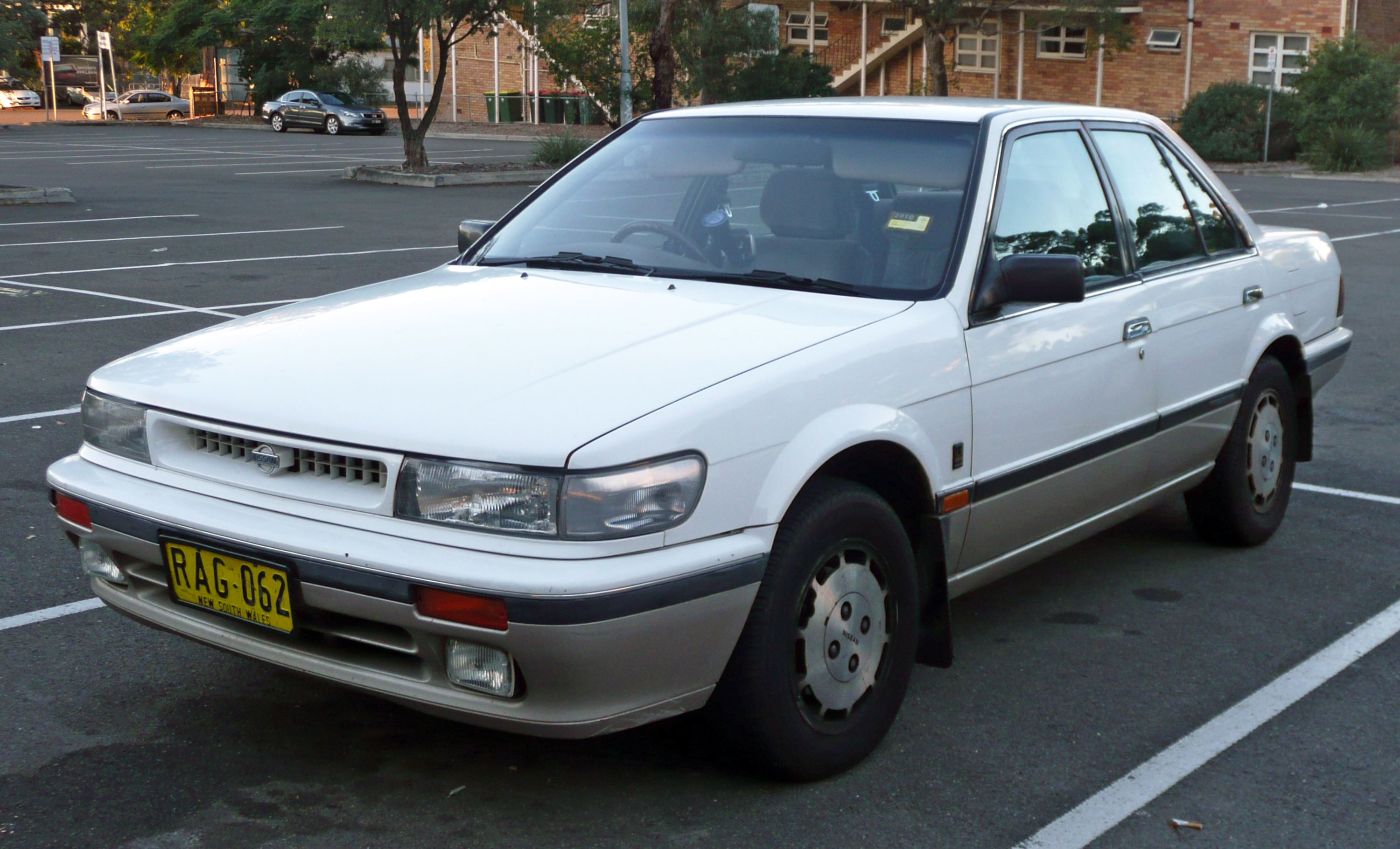

Overview
- Also called: Nissan Bluebird (New Zealand); Nissan Bluebird Aussie (Japan); Nissan Stanza (Americas); Ford Corsair (Australia)
- Production: 1989–1992

Body and chassis
- Body style: 4-door sedan 5-door hatchback (Superhatch)
- Layout: Front-engine, front-wheel-drive

Powertrain
- Engine: 2.0 L CA20E I4; 2.4 L KA24E I4

The first generation Pintara was replaced in 1989 by a model initially dubbed by the media as "Project Matilda", which turned out to be a locally produced front-wheel drive version of the Nissan Bluebird (U12), rather than a model uniquely designed for Australia as initial stories had indicated. However, the model performed badly in local testing, and required body and chassis strengthening.

In Australia, this was sold as the Nissan Pintara (U12), also available as a locally designed five-door "Superhatch". The sedan and Superhatch were exported to New Zealand as the Nissan Bluebird (replacing locally assembled models sourced from Japan) while the Superhatch was exported to Japan as the Bluebird Aussie.

The U12 model was discontinued in mid-1992 when Nissan Australia ended local production and New Zealand reverted to local assembly of the next generation Bluebird from Japanese kits.

Under the Button car plan, in which local manufacturers shared models, Ford Australia marketed a rebadged version of the U12 Pintara sedan and hatchback as the Ford Corsair. In addition, Ford provided the tooling and stamped the car's body panels.

Nissan fitted a 2.0-litre CA20E inline-four engine to the GLi and Executive levels of trim. This engine was rated at 83 kW (111 hp) (DIN) at 5200 rpm for power, and 168 N⋅m (124 ft⋅lbf) (DIN) at 4000 rpm torque.

T, Ti, and TRX versions received a 2.4-litre KA24E inline-four. This engine produced 96 kW (129 hp) (DIN) at 5600 rpm and 189 N⋅m (139 ft⋅lbf) (DIN) at 2800 rpm. Fitted with electronic concentrated control system (ECCS) for precise MPI fuel injection, the 2.4-litre also featured ignition timing control with SOHC and three valves per cylinder (two intake, one exhaust).

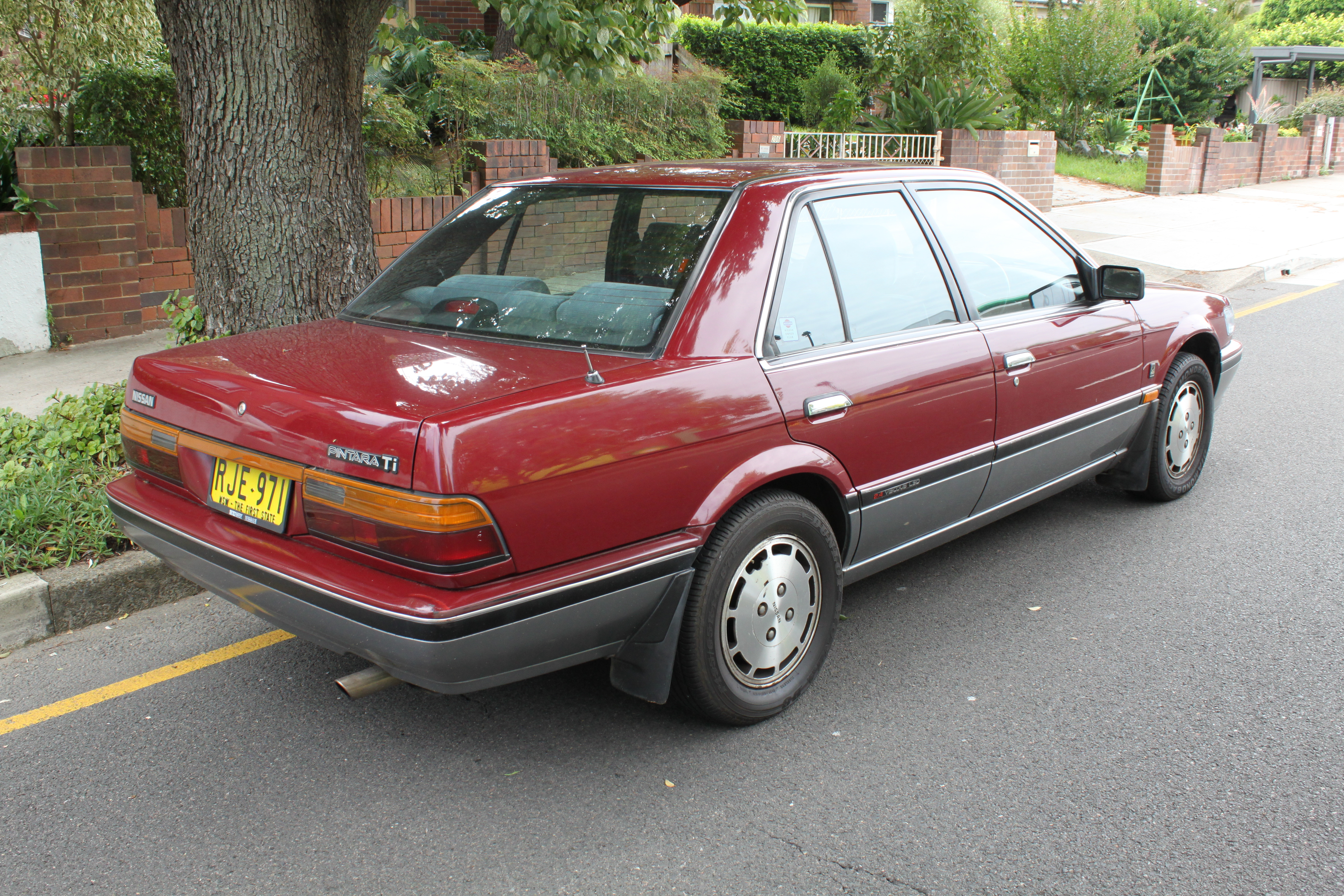
Pintara (U12) Ti sedan

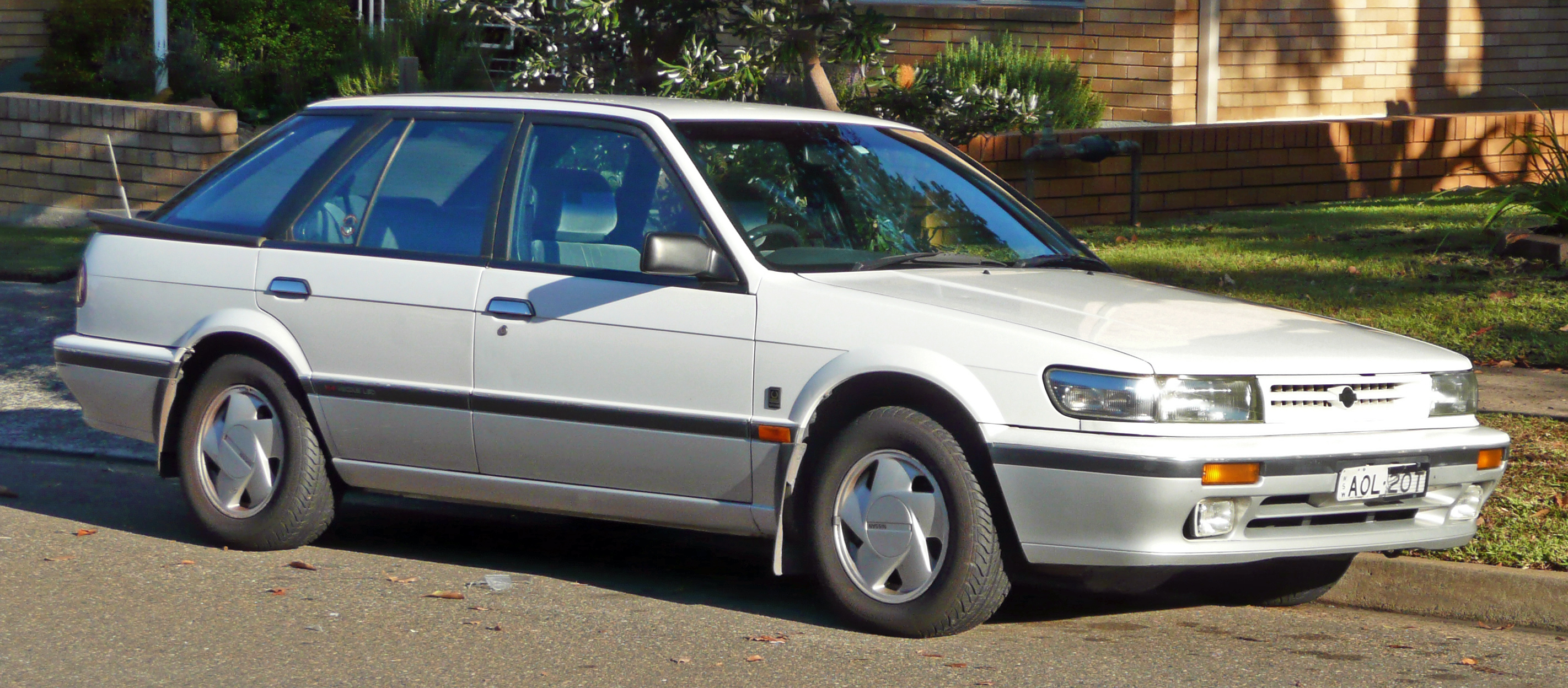
Pintara (U12) Ti Superhatch

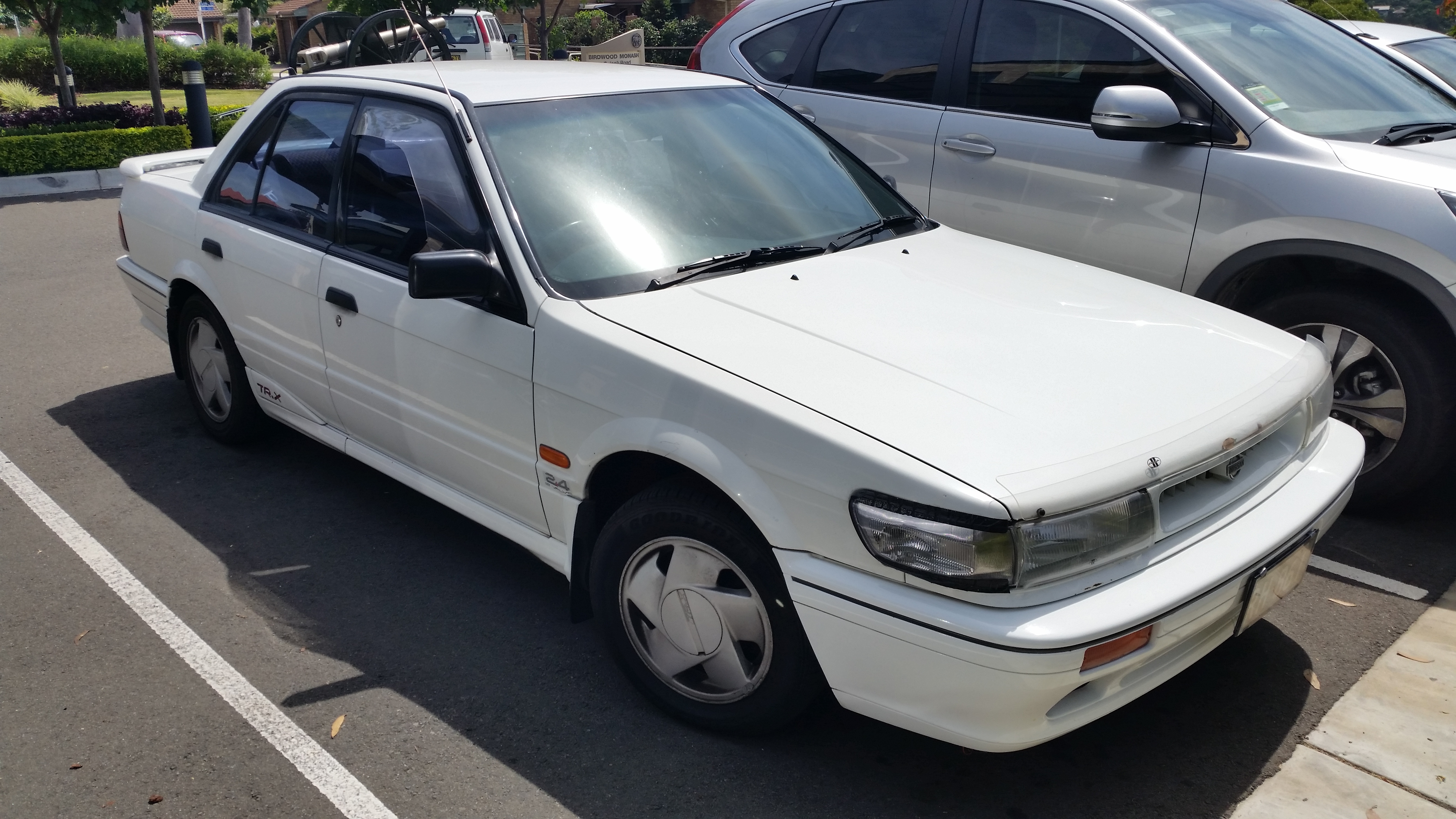
Pintara (U12) TR.X sedan

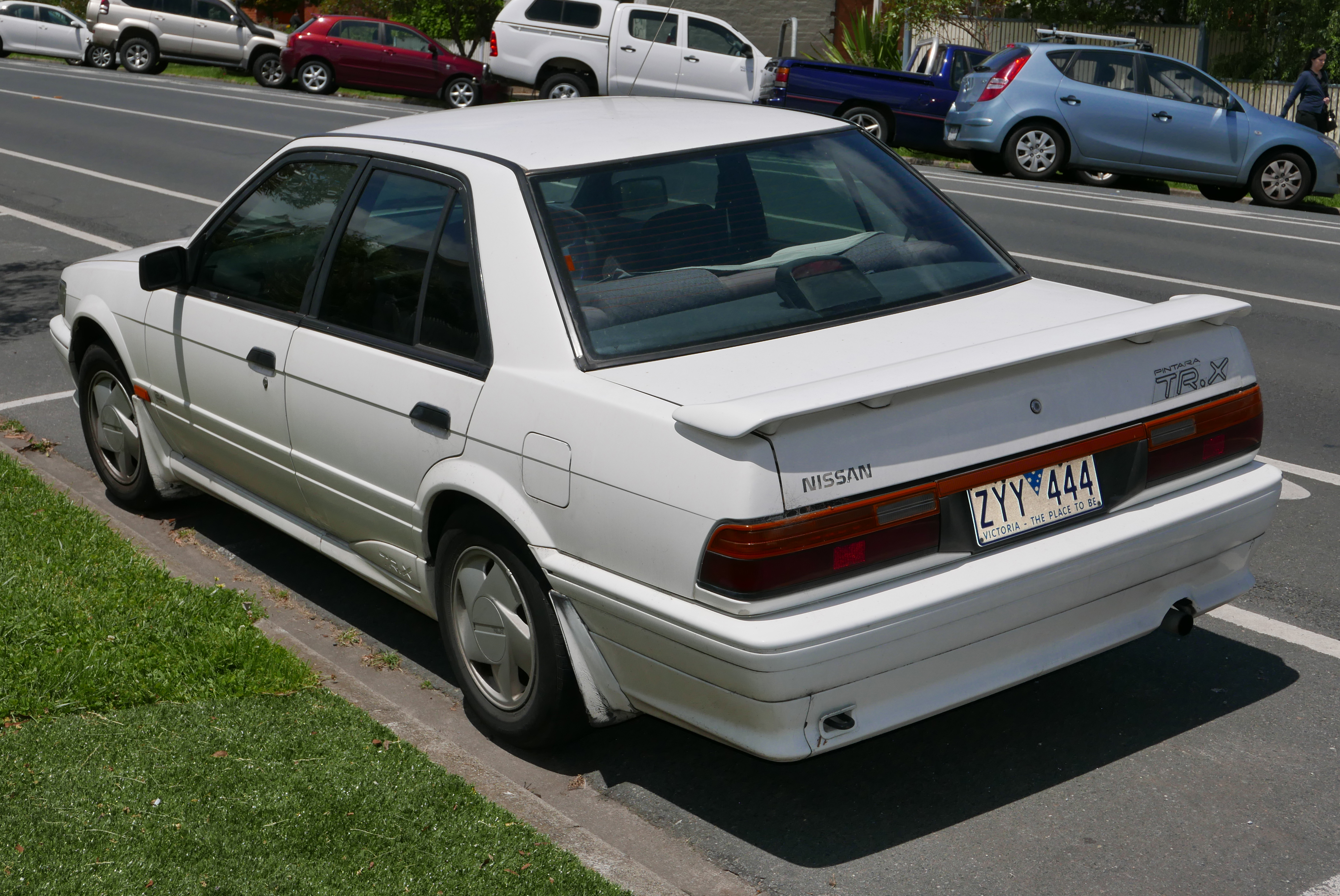
Pintara (U12) TR.X sedan

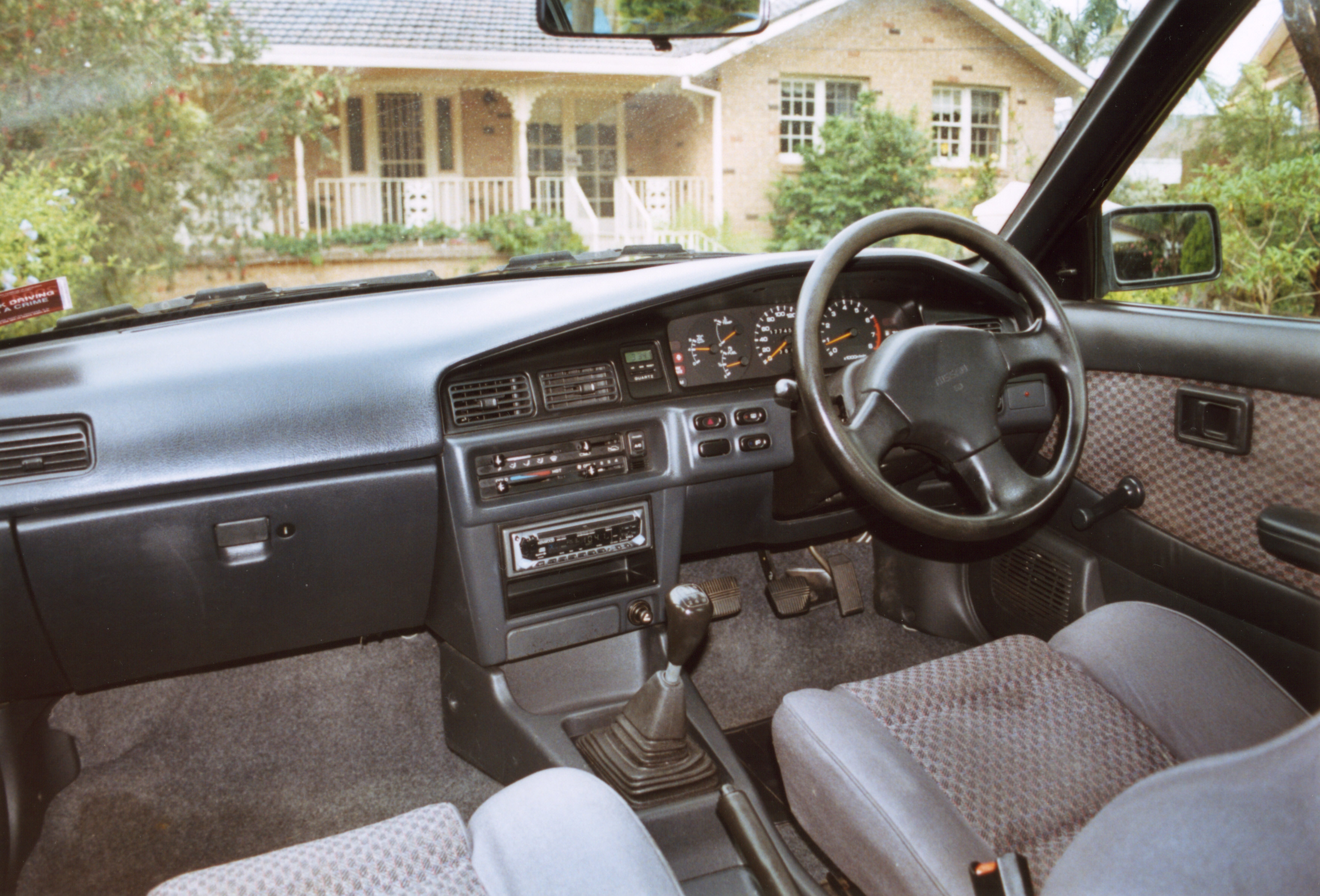
Pintara (U12) TR.X sedan interior
