= Crayford Engineering =

English automobile manufacturer

- Industry: Automobile coachbuilder
- Founded: 1962
- Founders: Jeffrey Smith, David McMullan
- Headquarters: Westerham, Kent, United Kingdom

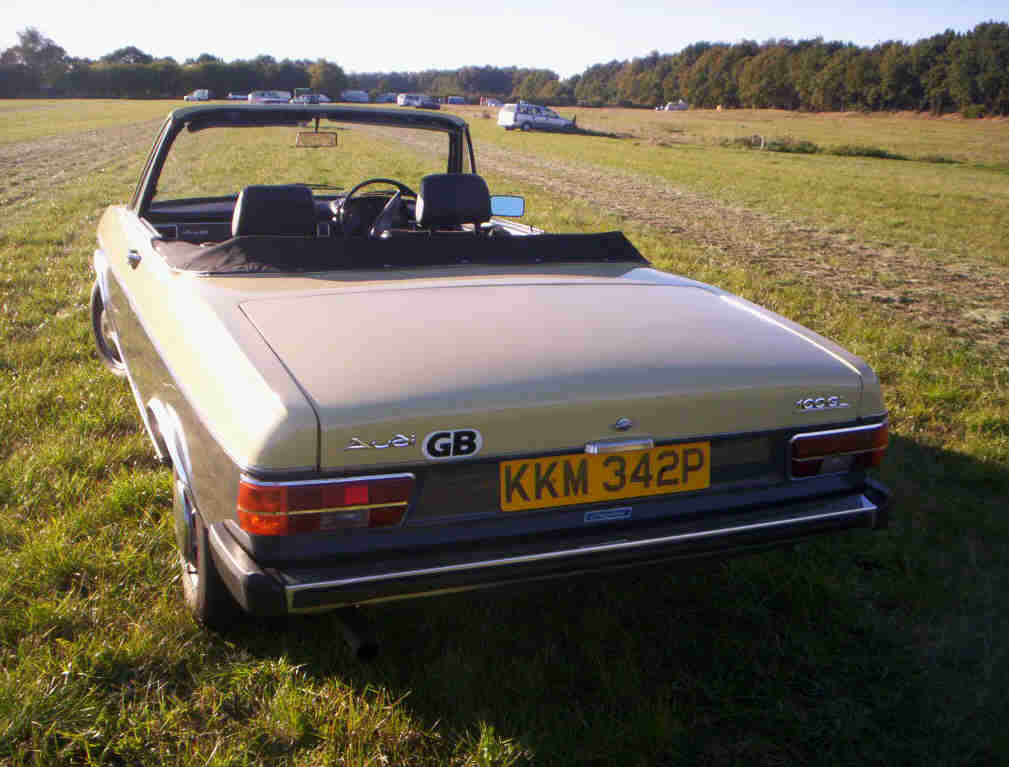
Crayford Convertible, based on 1975 Audi 100

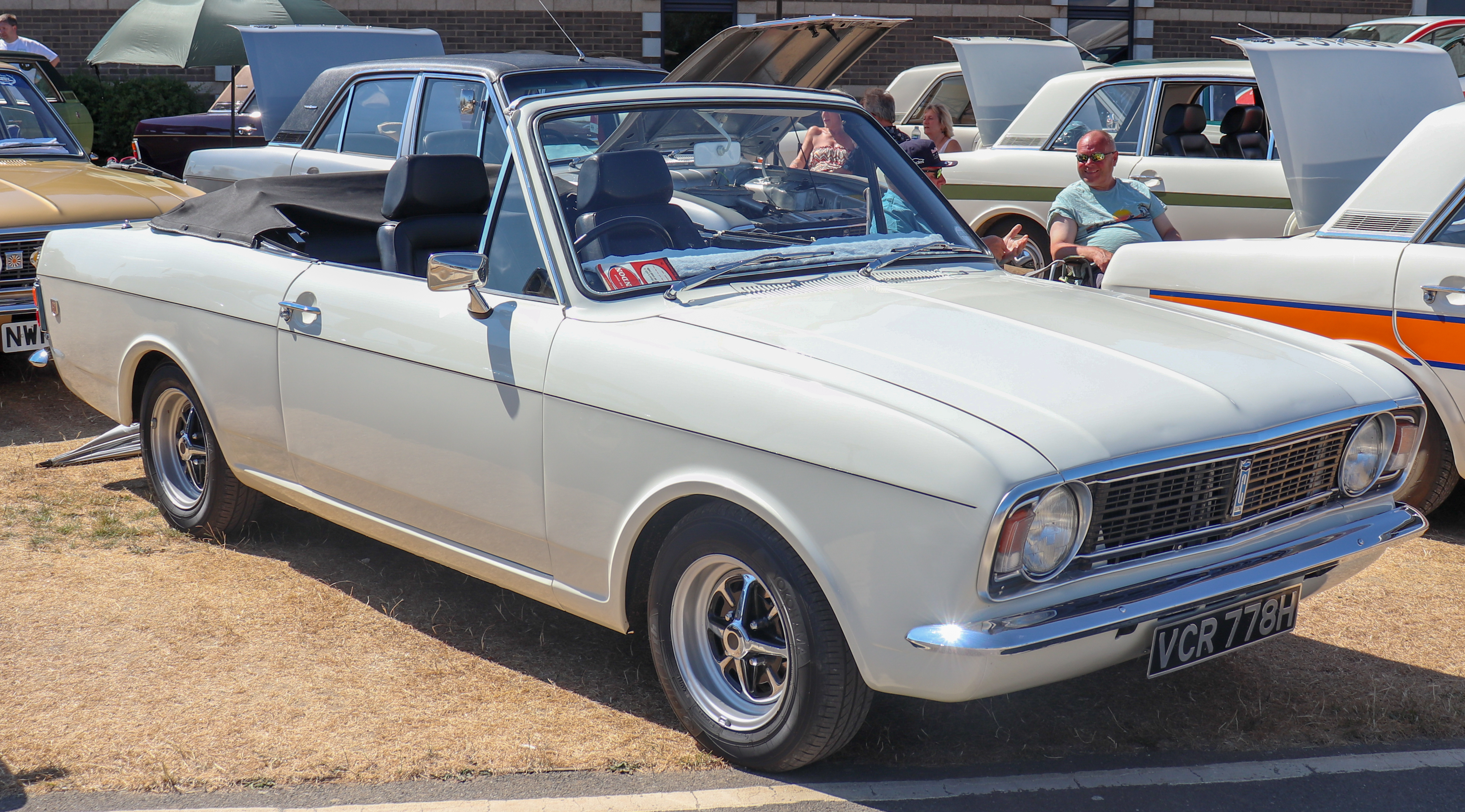
1970 Ford Cortina convertible by Crayford

Crayford Engineering (more commonly known simply as Crayford) was an automobile coachbuilder based in Westerham, Kent, England and formed in 1962 by Jeffrey Smith (engineer and designer) and David McMullan, MBE (sales). In the 1970s, a subdivision within the company, called Crayford Auto Developments, Ltd., was established for automobiles. The company specialized in converting European coupés and saloons into convertibles and estates. Notable products included the convertible Mini, BMC 1100/1300 convertible, convertible Corsair, Cabriolet Corsair, Cabriolet Capri, the rare Triumph TR7 Tracer Estate, and a Princess hatchback conversion, a commonly accepted principle for a car that appeared to be, but was not, a hatchback to begin with. Other lesser-known conversions from Crayford included the Tempest, a convertible Volkswagen Scirocco, a Ford Cortina Mk V Convertible, and a Mercedes S-Class Estate. In 1966 the company converted, for the Heinz food company, 57 Wolseley Hornet Mini-derived cars to convertibles, to be given as prizes in a competition. The cars designed and created by Jeffrey Smith were featured in the Olympic Closing Ceremony in London 2012.

Crayford also did a series of Ford convertibles, including the Cortina Mk I, Cortina Mk II, Cortina Cabriolet Mk2 and Corsair Convertible, Corsair Cabriolet and Capri Cabriolet.

A number of Mercedes-Benz W116s were converted to station wagons by Crayford. Most of the conversion body parts and glass used came from the contemporary Ford Granada.
