= Nissan Motor Australia =

Former car manufacturer

Nissan Motor Co. (Australia) Pty. Ltd.
- Type: Subsidiary
- Industry: Automotive
- Founded: 1966; 60 years ago
- Headquarters: Mulgrave, Victoria
- Area served: Australia
- Key people: Andrew Humberstone (managing director)
- Products: Automobiles
- Parent: Nissan
- Website: www.nissan.com.au

Nissan Motor Co. (Australia) Pty. Ltd. is the Australian arm of Japanese automaker Nissan that specializes in the sales and distribution of Nissan and automobiles in Australia. Formed in 1966, it is currently headquartered in Mulgrave, Victoria. Until 1992, the company assembled passenger cars of the Japanese company.

== History ==
Nissan automobiles were imported to Australia as early as the 1930s. In the early 1960s, the Australian industrialist Lawrence Hartnett became aware of the brand and took over local sales. In 1966 Sydney-based Pressed Metal Corporation began assembly of up to 20,000 Bluebirds annually for the Australian market.

As early as 1968, Nissan was named as a tenant of the closed Volkswagen Australia plant. The Volkswagen subsidiary Motor Producers Limited manufactured Datsun vehicles there from 1968. In 1971, Nissan was able to sell twice as many vehicles as Volkswagen in Australia. The assembly activity was expanded further in 1972.

Following the decision by the Nissan management to meet the Australian government's target of 85% local production, the Clayton plant was to be converted back to full production (instead of assembling kits). Since Volkswagen no longer wanted to invest in the plant, a full takeover of Motor Producers Limited by Nissan was agreed. The local CKD assembly of Volkswagen vehicles was to be carried out under the responsibility of Nissan from April 1976 until it was finally discontinued in March 1977.

Independent production in Clayton began in 1977 with the Datsun 200B. The Australian model had a different rear axle than its Japanese counterpart. Other assembled models were Nissan Gazelle and Nissan Pulsar, which were supplemented by Nissan Skyline and Nissan Pintara in 1986. Nissan's automobile production in Australia ended in 1992. Production had fallen to less than 36,000 vehicles in 1991, after nearly 58,000 were made in 1990. A final 20,231 examples were built in 1992.

The Nissan Motor Manufacturing Company subsidiary operated a foundry; by the mid-1980s, 90 percent of their production was being exported. As of 2017, cast engine parts were still manufactured in Nissan Casting Plant (NCAP), a factory which was built when the subsidiary was established in 1982. This makes it Australia's last remaining OEM parts manufacturer.

In 2009 Nissan launched Nissan Financial Services, a wholly owned subsidiary of Nissan Australia to provide financial services to its dealers and customers. In 2013 Nissan Financial Services Australia established a wholly owned subsidiary in New Zealand, Nissan Financial Services New Zealand Pty Ltd. Nissan Financial Services Australia Pty Ltd and Nissan Financial services New Zealand Pty Ltd are headed by their Managing Director Andrew Maeer.

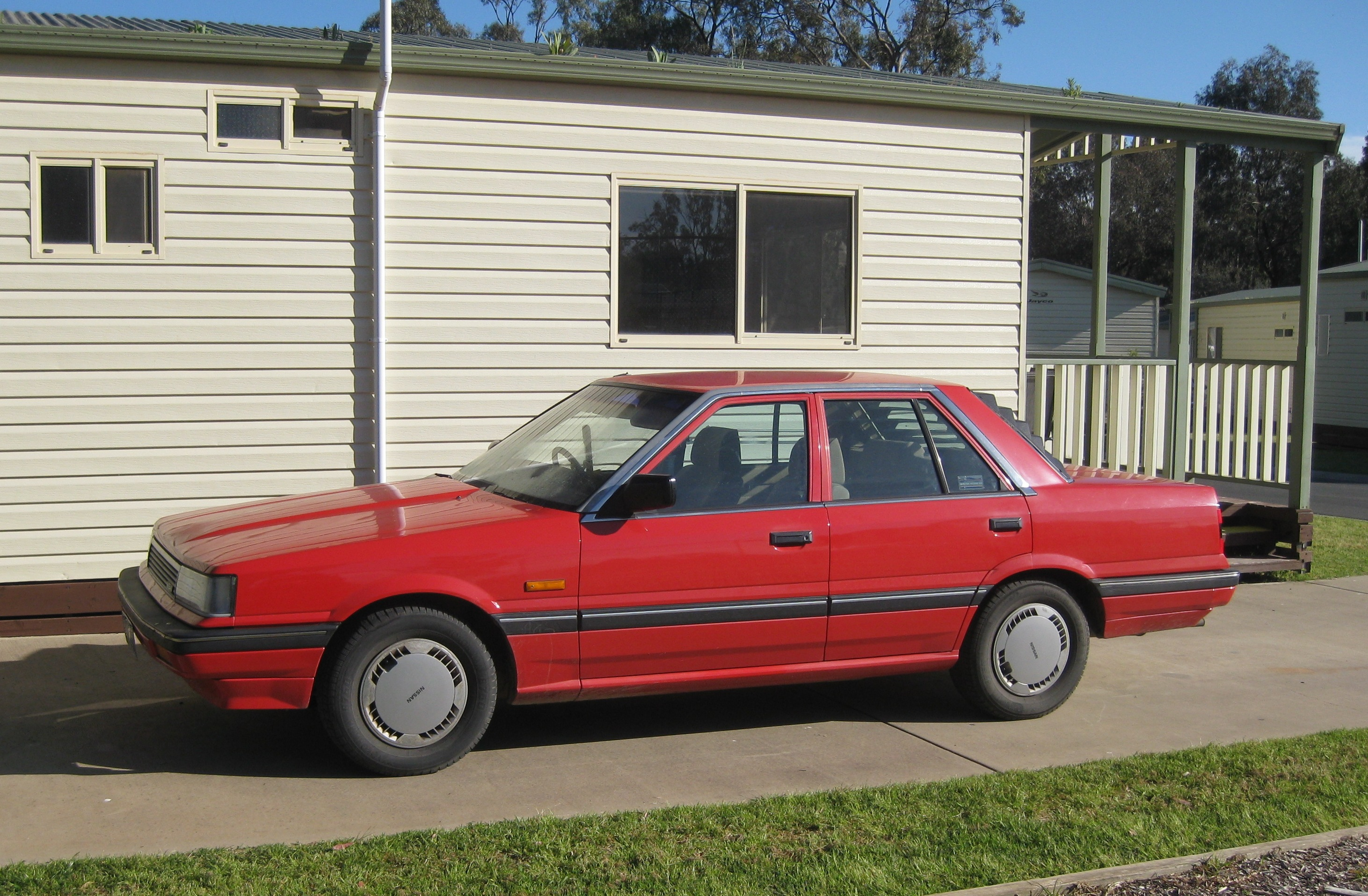
1986 Nissan Pintara GX Sedan (R31). The Pintara was a Nissan Skyline, produced locally by Nissan Australia from 1986 to 1992.
