= Cortina Savage =

Customised British automobile

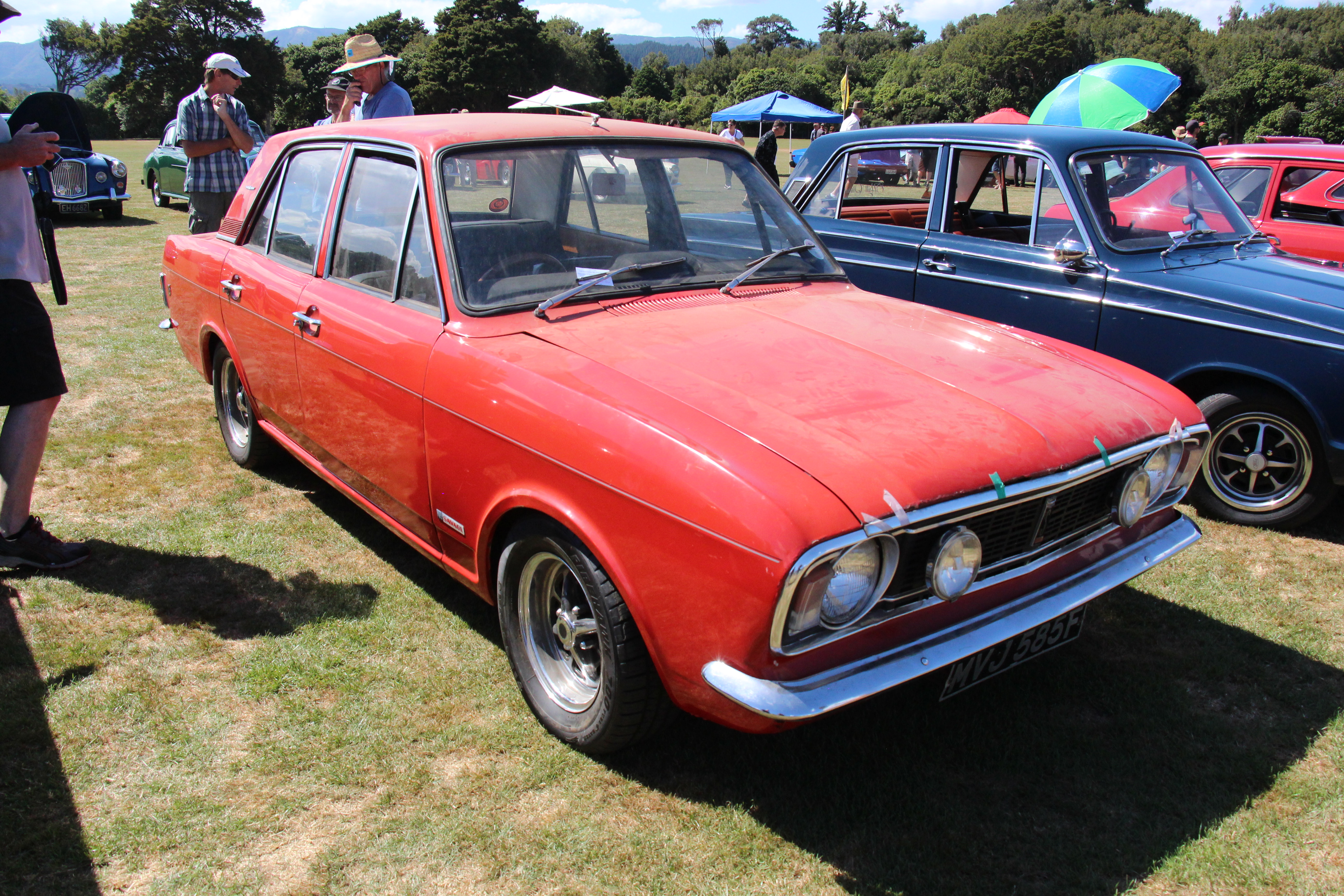
- 1969 Mk2 Cortina Savage

Overview
- Manufacturer: Race Proved Performance and Racing Equipment Ltd.; Jeff Uren Ltd.
- Designer: Jeff Uren

Body and chassis
- Layout: F/R layout
- Platform: Ford Cortina
- Related: Cortina Cheetah

Powertrain
- Engine: 2,994 cc (183 cu in) Ford Essex V6
- Transmission: 4-speed manual; 3-speed automatic

The Cortina Savage is a custom performance automobile based on the Ford Cortina. The car was designed and produced by Jeff Uren and his companies, Race Proved Performance and Racing Equipment Ltd., and Jeff Uren Ltd. Production of the conversion started in the mid-1960s and was applied to multiple generations of the Cortina, with the Mk2 Savage built in the largest numbers.

== History ==
Uren started out as a tuner and race driver, winning the 1959 British Saloon Car Champion as a privateer driving a Ford Zephyr Mark 2. He later managed the Ford Works team before joining John Willment's race team, which initially operated as the Willment Racing Division of the parent John Willment Automobiles (JWA) organisation, and later as Race Proved by Willment. The first racing win ever by a Cortina was taken by a Willment Cortina Mk1 that came from the back of the pack to win its debut outing. Uren was involved with the development of Willment's "Super Sprint" and "Sprint GT" Mk1 Cortinas, and his own company continued to produce the Sprint GT model after Willment's departure.

In 1966 John Willment left to establish J.W. Automotive Engineering. Partnering with John Wyer, this new company took over construction of the Ford GT40 from Ford Advanced Vehicles, as well as the racing operation. In 1967 Uren established Race Proved Performance and Racing Equipment Ltd. By the early 1970s most advertising referred to Jeff Uren Ltd.

Original development of the Cortina Savage was done based on Mk1 Cortinas. Some sources claim that as many as six Mk1 Cortina Savages were built, and that some still exist. The provenance of these cars, and the type of engines powering them, are unconfirmed. The first car generally recognised as having received the "Savage" treatment was the Mk2 Cortina. Conversions of Cortina Mk3s, Mk4s and even a one-off Mk5 followed. A Cortina Savage could be had as a two door or four door saloon, or an estate car.

Regarding his supply of Cortinas, Uren recalled

Walter Hayes (the then head of Ford GB's PR), wangled us quite a lot of 1600E Cortinas for us to convert although they were very scarce at the time. He approved of the Savage because it put Fords into the hands of a different class of user — older people, quite well-off, who bought them as fun cars.

For twenty years, starting in 1971 and ending in 1991, a Cortina Savage was Uren's personal vehicle. This particular car was one of two reported estate car conversions, and was one of the few with an automatic transmission.

== Details ==
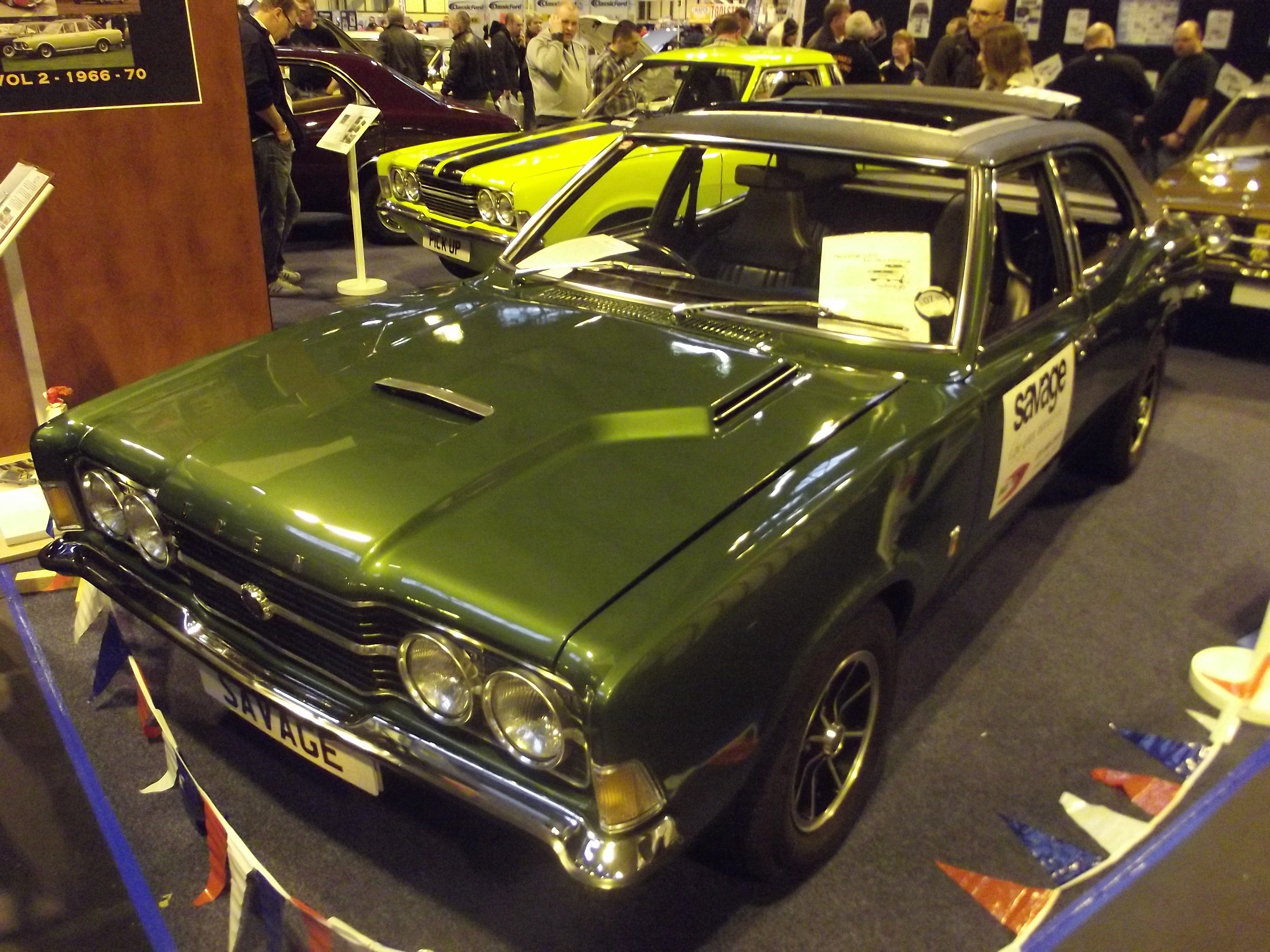
Mk3 Cortina Savage

The defining feature of the Cortina Savage is its 3.0 L Ford Essex V6 engine upgrade.

Weslake provided engine tuning services for factory conversions. Customers could choose from several levels of tune, starting with a standard specification Ford 3.0 L Essex with 138 bhp (102.9 kW) and 182 ft⋅lb (246.8 N⋅m) of torque, or engines making 170 bhp (126.8 kW), 180 bhp (134.2 kW), or 190 bhp (141.7 kW). The highest output engine offered in a factory car was a 218 bhp (162.6 kW) version based on the Weslake 190 with Tecalemit fuel-injection and a "Mati" exhaust system from Perkins Commercial Services. This engine was installed in a model named the Cortina Savage SS PI, where "SS" stands for "Savage Special", and "PI" stands for "Petrol Injection". A 1972 comparison test revealed that this model could accelerate 0–60 mph (0–100 km/h) as quickly as a Jaguar E-Type V12.

To accommodate the increased power, torque, and weight that came with the V6 engine, several changes were made to the Cortina. A larger radiator and thermostatically controlled fan were installed. Shorter coil springs were selected, and spring rates adjusted, as were damper settings. The strut attachment points were reinforced, and the front suspension geometry was changed to add negative camber. A front anti-roll bar was added. Power went to the rear axle through a 4-speed manual transmission from the Ford Corsair V4 GT or 2000E, with an automatic transmission as an option. The rear axle included a Powr-Lok limited-slip differential with a 3.77:1 ratio and strengthened axles.

To extend driving range, an extra fuel tank holding 8 imp gal (36.4 L; 9.6 US gal) was mounted in the boot. Other changes included fitting 5.5 in (140 mm) Lotus-Cortina road wheels shod with Goodyear G800 radial ply tyres, anti-fade brake pads and linings and, on the interior, a leather-wrapped alloy spoke steering wheel, a wooden shift knob, a dead pedal, Contour racing-style front seats, and a speedometer calibrated to 140 mph (225 km/h). V6 badging on the boot and a stripe along the bottom of the sides were added to the exterior.

A distinctive optional feature offered on the Mk3 Cortina Savage was a custom fibreglass bonnet made by Specialised Mouldings. Other options included Mati headers and power pipes, Dunlop wheels, adjustable monotube dampers, and various brake upgrades.

In 1967, pricing for the Mk2 Cortina Savage started at £1365, with options such as magnesium wheels, Cox GT3 seats and inertia-reel belts, and a Weathershields sliding roof adding £90, £35, and just over £41 respectively. The cost of a new Mk3 Cortina Savage in the early 1970s started at around £2,000, plus the cost of the options selected by the buyer. The all-in price for the 1971 Cortina Savage SS PI was £2665.

Beside the 3.0 L Savage, the company also offered the Cortina Cheetah model that used the 2.5 L Essex V6. In 1978 it was also possible for the home mechanic to buy a complete installation kit for £315 and install a 2.5 L or 3.0 L Essex engine that they supplied themselves.

== Production and survivors ==
Production of all versions is estimated to have been between 1,000 and 1,100 Savages, all but 50 to 100 of which were Mk2 conversions. Uren is believed to have built a total of 1,700 vehicles, including the Cortina Savage and other models such as the Escort-based Navajo and Apache, and the Capri-based Comanche and Stampede.

Five surviving Mk3 Cortina Savages are known to the Cortina Mark Three Club, two of which are still on the road.

== Reviews and driving impressions ==
A review of the Mk2 in the August 1967 issue of Autocar magazine stated

it really does hitch its skirts and get moving in the open roads in a manner that will leave practically everything else standing

while Motor Sport magazine stated

The outstanding feature of the Savage is how enjoyable, yet effortless, it is to drive

The Mk3 was reviewed by Motor, who called it the

absolute ultimate in hot Cortinas

== Motorsports ==
- A car driven by Peter Graham and Leslie Morrish appeared in the 1968 Daily Express London-Sydney Marathon.
- Peter Graham and Leslie Morrish teamed up again in the 1970 The Daily Mirror World Cup Rally 40.

== Model versions ==
Corgi Toys manufactured a 1:43 scale version of a Mk 4 Cortina Savage in Gold with a vinyl roof.
