= Clutch control =

Controlling the speed of a vehicle with a manual transmission

Clutch control is the controlling of the speed of a manual transmission vehicle by partially engaging the clutch plate, using the clutch pedal instead of (or in conjunction with) the accelerator pedal. The purpose of a clutch is in part to allow such control; in particular, a clutch provides transfer of torque between shafts spinning at different speeds. In the extreme, clutch control is used in performance driving, such as starting from a dead stop with the engine producing maximum torque at high RPM.

== Overview ==
With the clutch pedal completely pressed or a motorcycle's lever pulled entirely towards the driver, there is no direct link between the engine and the driveshaft, so no power can pass from the engine to the driveshaft and wheels. With the pedal entirely released, there is full contact between the engine and the driveshaft, via the clutch plate, which means that the engine can apply power directly to the driveshaft. However, it is possible to have the clutch plate partially engaged, allowing the clutch to slip. As a result, only a fraction of the power from the engine reaches the driveshaft, which is commonly known as half clutch.

== Benefits ==
There are benefits to the use of clutch control in specific circumstances:

=== Low gear and low speed ===
When a car is in first gear, small variations in engine speed translate to large changes in acceleration and engine braking. However, with a combination of clutch control and careful use of engine speed, a much smoother ride can be achieved by allowing the clutch to slip. Variations in engine revs are not immediately translated into changes in drive shaft rotation speed, but rather the friction on the clutch plate allows the drive shaft to gradually equalize with the speed of the engine.

==== Moving off from a standstill ====
At a certain point while gently lifting the clutch, the car will begin to move as the clutch starts to slip, referred to as the biting point. Here, the accelerator pedal should be gently depressed to slowly increase the car's speed. Once the car reaches a suitable speed, the clutch can be fully engaged and speed can then be controlled either by varying the engine speed or by partially disengaging the clutch again if necessary.

This particular use of clutch control is frequently taught to learning drivers as a way to control acceleration when pulling away from a complete stop or when driving at very slow speeds while minimizing the chance of stalling the engine.

==== Creeping ====
Creeping generally refers to moving slowly, and is generally analogous to a parking situation or very slow moving traffic. Creeping is usually done in either reverse or first gear, like when reversing out of a parking space or pulling into a driveway. While moving at low speeds like these, it is often not necessary to use the accelerator pedal as an engine's idle speed should provide enough torque to do so, given a driver is careful enough with the clutch pedal. Revving the engine higher than necessary while moving at low speeds and the clutch not fully engaged can cause damage to the system due to heat caused by friction on the clutch material, reducing its usable lifespan. This is mitigated in most motorcycles by the use of a wet clutch.

=== Uphill start ===
When pulling away on an uphill slope, the chance of stalling the engine is greater, and so it can be beneficial to engage the clutch more slowly than normal while revving higher than normal.

=== Adverse road conditions ===
In adverse road conditions, notably snow or ice, it is recommended to pull away in as high a gear as possible (usually second) to minimize torque on the wheels and thereby maintain traction with the road. Pulling away requires progressively slower engagement of the clutch as the gear increases, and in a high gear it is necessary to engage the clutch slowly to avoid the increased risk of stalling the engine, or, in the case of adverse weather conditions, spinning the wheels.

=== Balancing the clutch ===
Normally, when a vehicle is stationary on an uphill slope it is necessary to use the handbrake in conjunction with clutch control to prevent the vehicle from rolling backwards when pulling away. However, in situations where the vehicle must be stopped briefly, for example in slow moving traffic, the clutch can be used to balance the uphill force from the engine with the downhill force of gravity. In very few instances this may be useful, but generally should be avoided as doing this habitually will cause excessive wear on the clutch.

=== Deceleration ===
Typically with motorcycles and in motor sport, the clutch is often used to facilitate the use of resistance from the engine spinning at high speeds to decelerate the vehicle more quickly, often accompanied with normal braking. This can be achieved by placing the vehicle in a gear that would ordinarily be too low for the current speed and momentum of the vehicle and by partly engaging the clutch. When this happens, momentum energy from the inertia of the vehicle is taken away to spin the engine as close as possible to its maximum capability. As the vehicle is decelerating, the clutch can be further released to transfer more energy to keep the engine spinning as quickly as possible. This method causes excessive clutch wear, however, and it could cause severe engine damage or wheel lockup if the clutch were to be released suddenly.

A better method is to downshift to a lower gear that would spin the engine within its RPM limit and use the throttle to "rev match" the engine to the road speed before releasing the clutch fully. Effective engine braking is still achieved with little or no excessive clutch wear.

Once the clutch is entirely released and the vehicle has decelerated some, this cycle proceeds downwards through the gears to further assist deceleration. If the clutch is controlled improperly while this is being attempted, damage or extra wear to the engine and gears is possible, as well as the risk of wheels locking up and a subsequent loss of proper vehicle control.

== Problems ==
Even normal use of clutch control increases the wear (and decreases the lifespan) of the clutch. Excessive use of clutch control or "riding the clutch" will cause further damage.

=== Prolonged use ===
While the use of clutch control at low speed can be used to obtain greater control of acceleration and engine braking, once a car has picked up sufficient speed the clutch should be fully engaged (pedal released).

=== Excessive engine revolutions ===
Excessively revving the engine while using clutch control, or keeping the clutch partially engaged while accelerating with the gas pedal, can cause unnecessary damage to the clutch.

== Slipping the clutch ==
Slipping the clutch (sometimes referred to as feathering the clutch) is a term used by automotive enthusiasts to describe when the driver alternately applies and releases the clutch to achieve some movement of the car. It's called slipping because the clutch plate will slip against the flywheel surface when such an action is performed. Slipping the clutch is known to be hard on the clutch surface due to the sliding friction created.

Drivers can frequently be observed slipping the clutch when they are trying to stay stationary on a hill without using neutral and the brake. They apply the clutch to climb a bit, then release to roll back, then apply again, etc. so that the car stays in about the same place. With enough practice, alternating is no longer needed. Applying the correct amount of clutch pressure and throttle causes just enough force from the engine to counter gravity and keep the vehicle stationary (see balancing the clutch). The alternative to this technique of staying stationary on a hill would be to put the vehicle in neutral and apply the brake.

Slipping the clutch is a popular term in drag racing culture and is done when launching a car, usually in a drag race. Some contend that slipping the clutch is the best way to launch a front-wheel drive (FWD) car as it prevents torque steering that many FWD cars experience when too much power is put to the front wheels.

== Riding the clutch ==
In a vehicle with a manual transmission, riding the clutch refers to the practice of needlessly keeping the clutch partially disengaged. This results in the clutch being unable to fully engage with the flywheel and so causes premature wear on the disc and flywheel.

A common example of riding the clutch is to keep slight continual pressure on the clutch pedal whilst driving, as when a driver habitually rests his/her foot on the clutch pedal instead of on the floorboard or dead pedal. Although this slight pressure is not enough to allow the clutch disc itself to slip, it is enough to keep the release bearing against the release springs. This causes the bearing to remain spinning, which leads to premature bearing failure.

When shifting properly, the driver "shifts" to another gear and then releases pressure on the clutch pedal to re-engage the engine to the driveshaft. If the pedal is released quickly, a definite lurch can be felt as the engine and driveshaft re-engage and their speeds equalize. However, if the clutch is released slowly the clutch disc will "slip" against the flywheel; this friction permits the engine a smoother transition to its new rotation speed. Such routine slippage causes wear on the clutch analogous to the wear-and-tear on a brake pad when stopping. Some amount of wear is unavoidable, but with better clutching/shifting technique it can be minimized by releasing the clutch as close to the correct engine speed for the gear and vehicle speed as possible. When upshifting, this will involve allowing the engine speed to fall. Conversely, when downshifting, increasing the engine speed with the accelerator prior to releasing clutch will result in a smoother transition and minimal clutch wear.

Riding the clutch occurs when the driver does not fully release the clutch pedal. This results in the clutch disc slipping against the flywheel and some engine power not being transferred to the drive train and wheels. While inefficient, most drivers routinely use this technique effectively when driving in reverse (as fully engaging the reverse gear results in velocity too great for the short distance traveled) or in stop-and-go traffic (as it is easier to control the throttle and acceleration at very slow speeds).

Riding the clutch should not be confused with "freewheeling" or "coasting", where the clutch is pressed down fully allowing the car to roll either downhill or from inertia. While this is not damaging to the car, it increases wear on the clutch release bearing, and can be considered a dangerous way to drive since one forgoes the ability to quickly accelerate if needed. It is, however, a common practice to roll into a parking space or over speed bumps via momentum.

== See also ==
- Double-clutching (technique)
