= Bond Equipe =

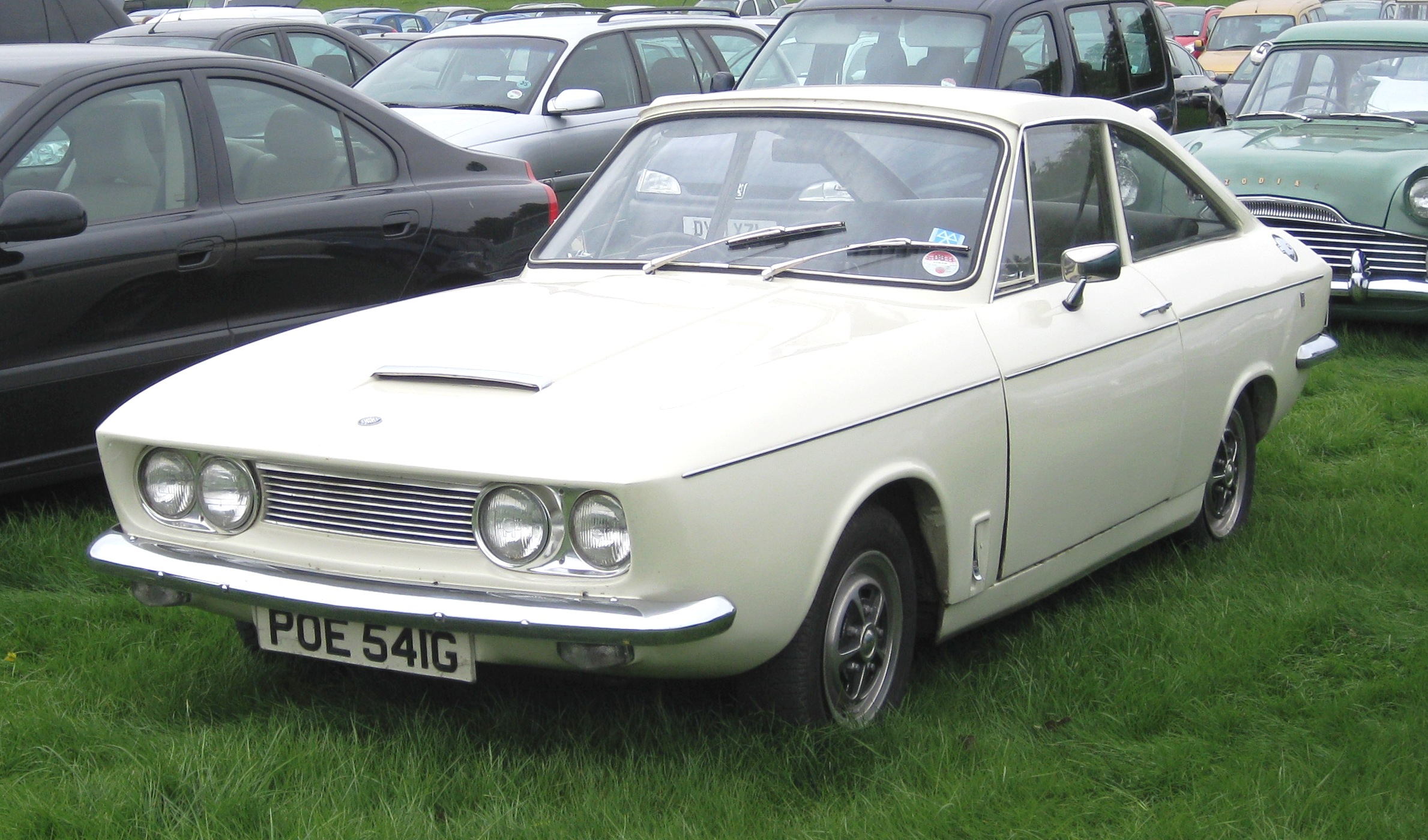
- Bond Equipe 2-Litre Saloon

Overview
- Manufacturer: Bond Cars Ltd
- Production: 1963-1970; 4,389 made
- Assembly: United Kingdom: Preston, England
- Designer: Trevor Fiore

Body and chassis
- Class: Sports car (S)
- Body style: 2-door saloon 2-door convertible

Powertrain
- Engine: Triumph 1147, 1296 or 1998 cc
- Transmission: 4-speed manual optional overdrive on 2 litre

Dimensions
- Wheelbase: 93 in (2,362 mm)
- Length: 160 in (4,064 mm)
- Width: 60 in (1,524 mm)

The Bond Equipe is an English 2+2 sports car, manufactured by Bond Cars Ltd from 1963 to 1970. It was the first 4-wheeled vehicle from Bond Cars.

== History ==
The original Equipe, the GT 2+2 (the 2+2 was retrospectively added to the name when the later GT4S was announced in 1964), was based on the Triumph Herald chassis with a fastback fibreglass body and also utilised further Triumph parts including the Herald windscreen/scuttle assembly and doors, together with a Spitfire engine. The September 1964 GT4S model saw revisions to the body with twin headlights and an opening rear boot. It was powered by the same, mildly tuned (63 bhp, later increased to 67 bhp), 1147 cc Standard SC engine used in the Triumph Spitfire.

The engine was switched to the 75 bhp (56 kW) 1296 cc version in April 1967, just one month after the Spitfire itself had undergone the same upgrade, the revised model being identified as the GT4S 1300. An increase in claimed output of 12% resulted. At the same time the front disc brakes were enlarged and the design of the rear suspension (one component not carried over unmodified from the Triumph Spitfire) received "attention".

The GT4S was joined by the 2-litre GT with a larger smoother body directly before the London Motor Show in October 1967. This model was based on the similar Triumph Vitesse chassis and used its 1998 cc 95 bhp (71 kW) six-cylinder engine. The 2-litre GT was available as a closed coupé and, later, as a convertible. The car was capable of 100 mph (161 km/h) with respectable acceleration. Horsepower and suspension improvements were made in line with Triumph's Mark 2 upgrade of the Vitesse in Autumn 1968, and the convertible was introduced at the same time.

== Production ==
- Bond Equipe GT 2+2: April 1963 - October 1964; 451 (including 7 known pre-production cars)
- Bond Equipe GT 4S: September 1964 - January 1967; 1934
- Bond Equipe GT 4S 1300: February 1967 - August 1970; 571
- Bond Equipe 2-Litre Mark I Saloon (incl. the 2 litre convertible prototype): August 1967 - September 1968; 591
- Bond Equipe 2-Litre Mark II Saloon and Convertible: September 1968 - October 1970; 841

Total Equipe Production = 4389 (including one known Mk.3 prototype made by Reliant Motor Co. at Tamworth)

Production finished at the end of July 1970 when Reliant, which had acquired Bond in February 1969, closed the factory. The last remaining vehicles were finally completed by the end of October 1970 with chassis no. V/10/5431 being the last Equipe 2 Litre Mark II Saloon produced.

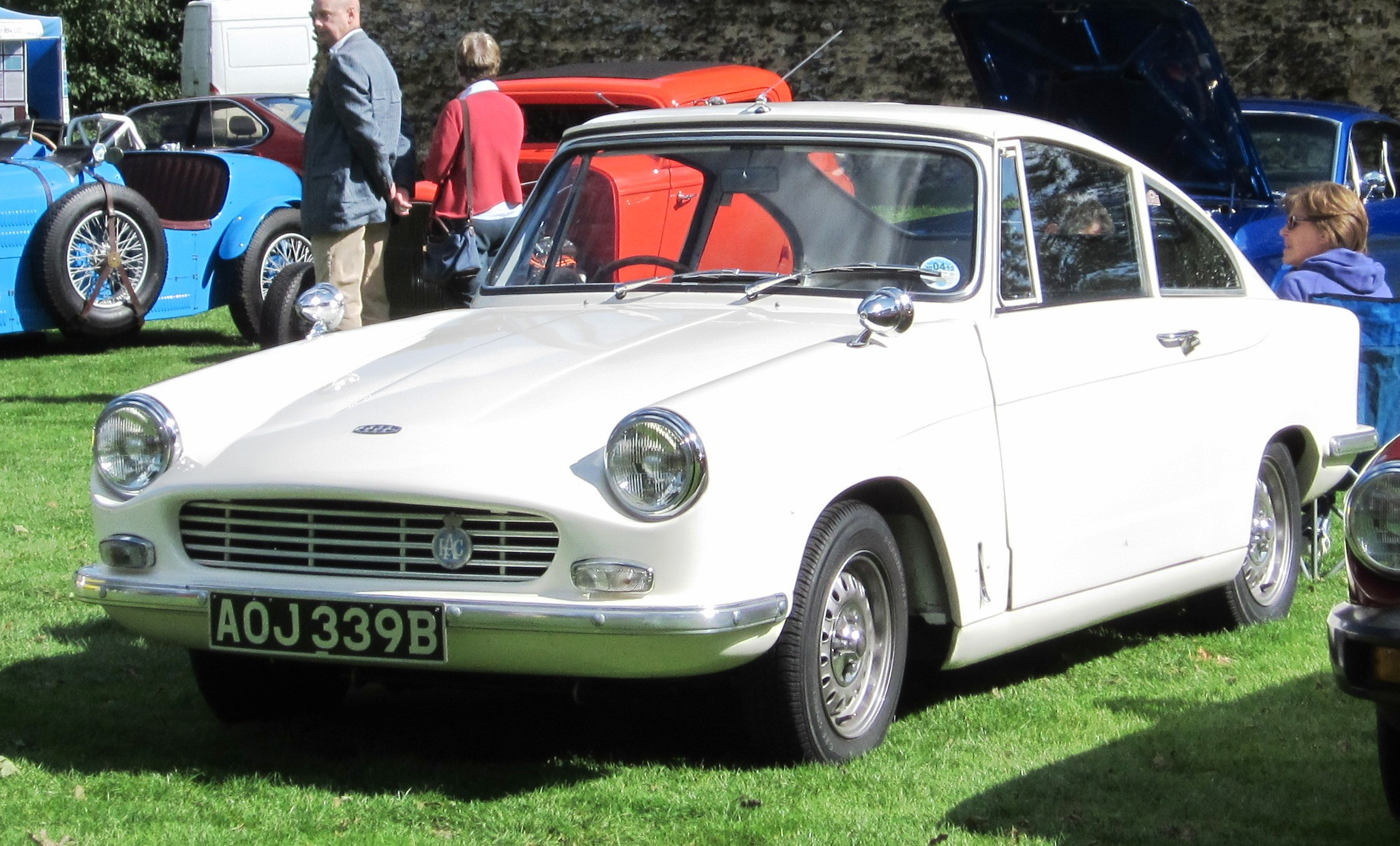
Bond Equipe GT 2+2

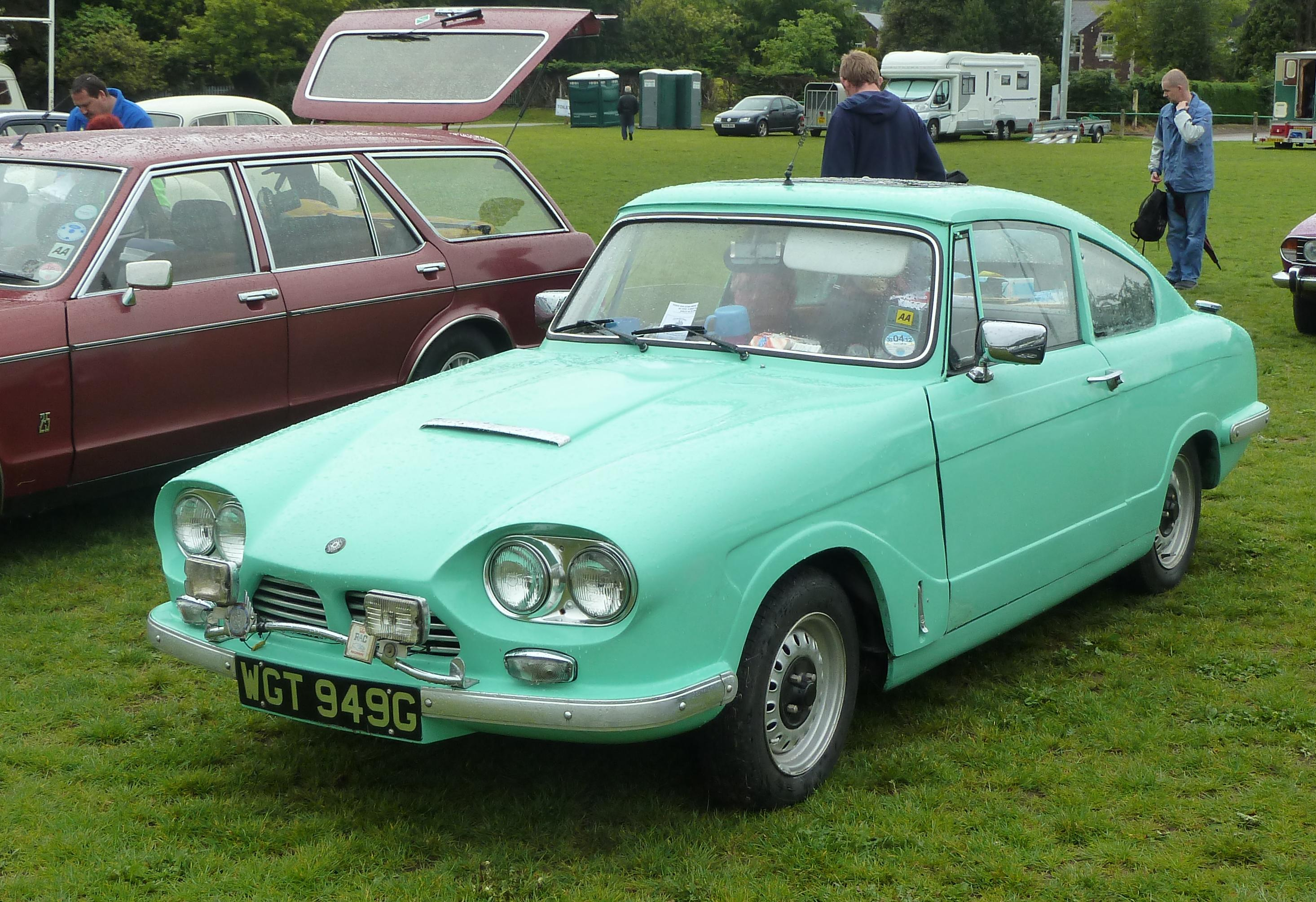
Bond Equipe GT 4S

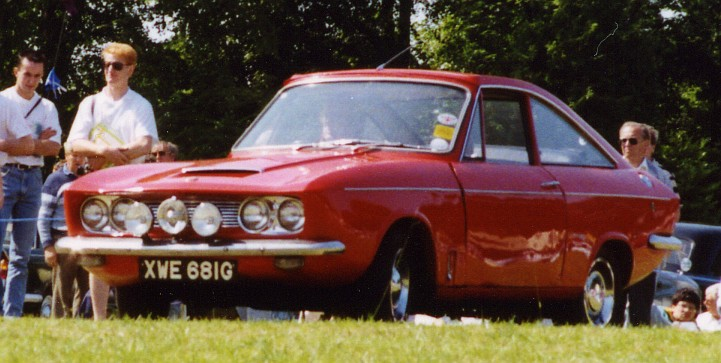
Bond Equipe 2-Litre Saloon

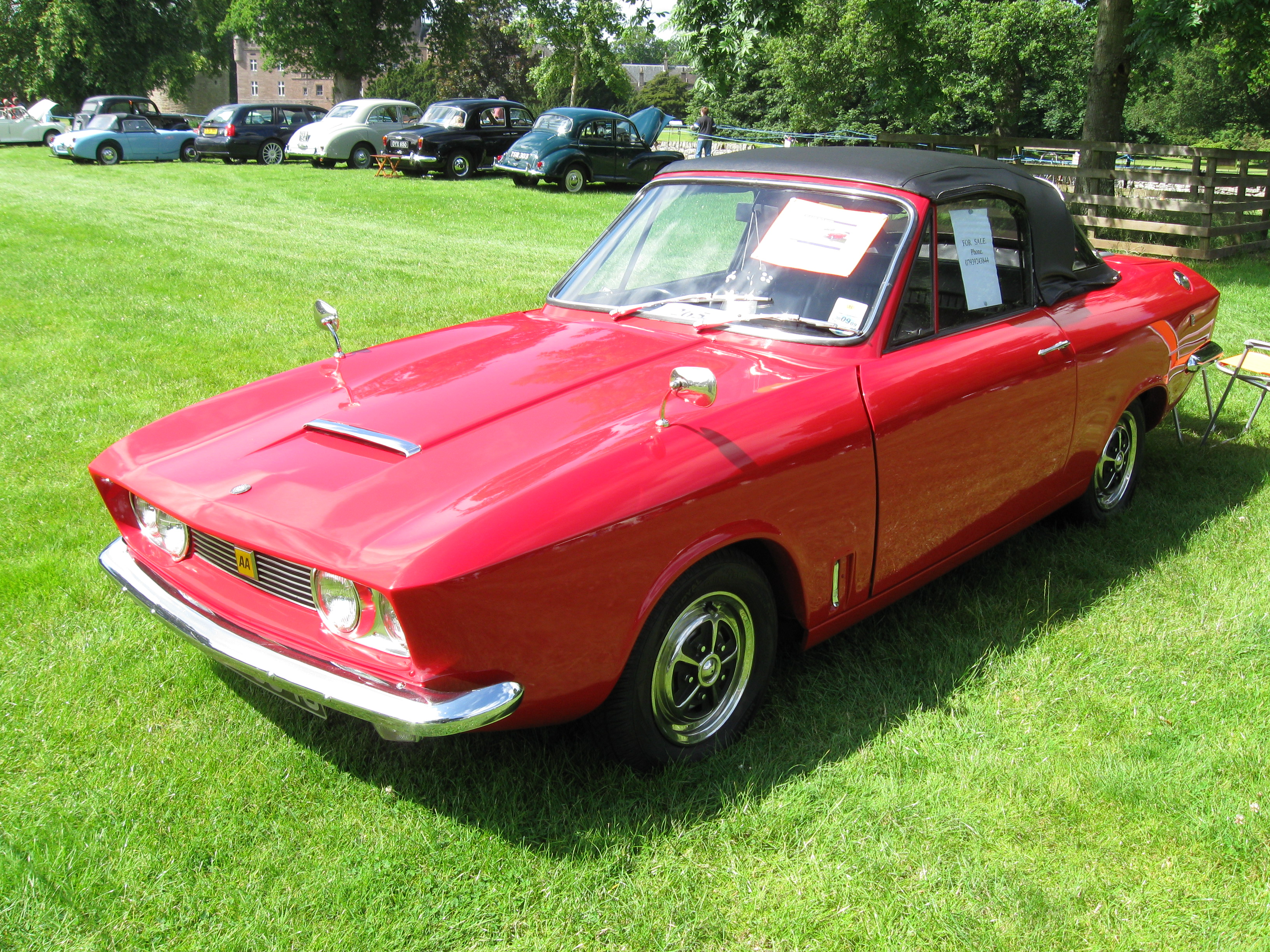
Bond Equipe 2-Litre Convertible
