= Citroën Karin =

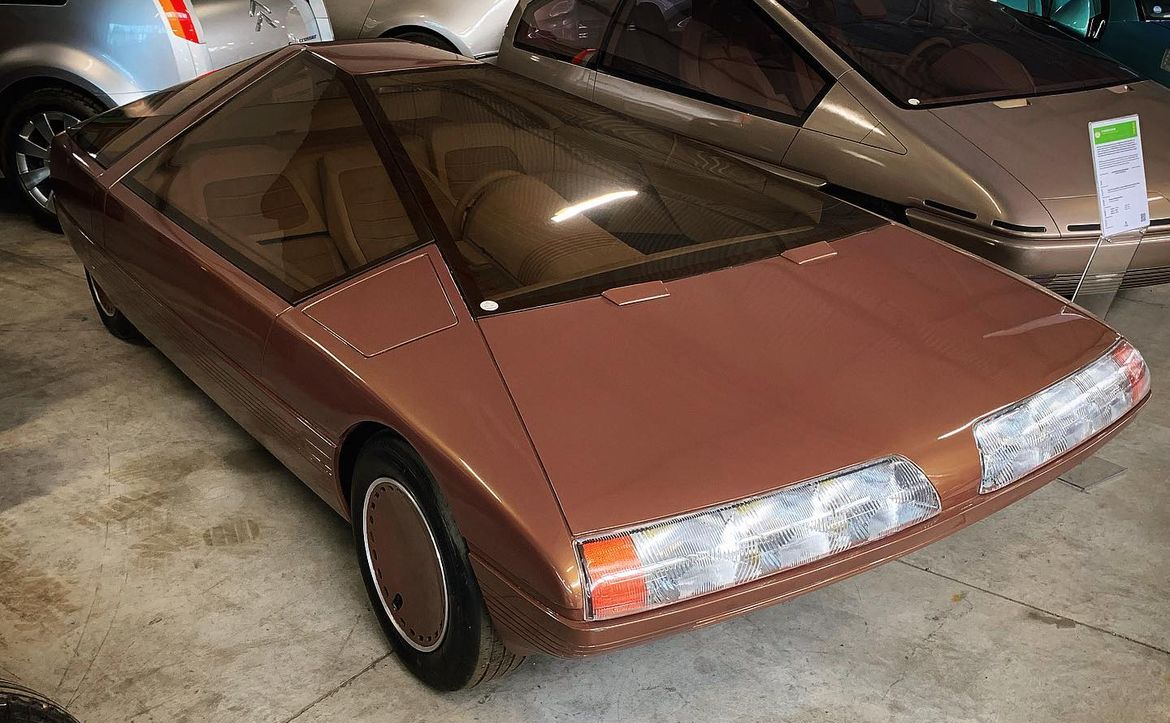
- Karin front

Overview
- Manufacturer: Citroën
- Model years: 1980
- Designer: Trevor Fiore

Body and chassis
- Class: Concept car
- Body style: 2-door coupe
- Doors: Butterfly

Dimensions
- Length: 3,700 mm (145.7 in)
- Width: 1,900 mm (74.8 in)
- Height: 1,075 mm (42.3 in)

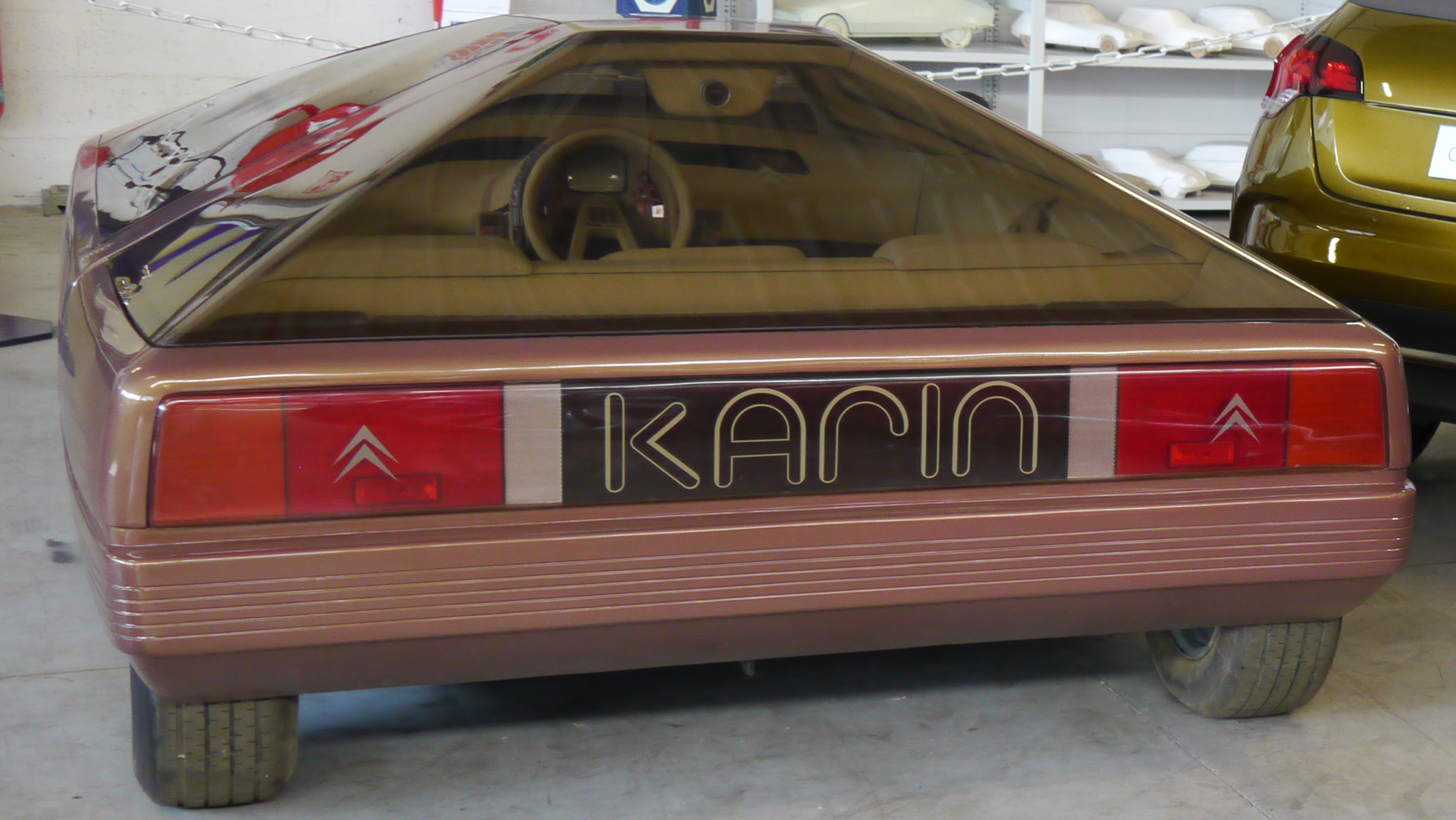
Rear view

The Citroën Karin is a concept car presented at the Paris Motor Show in 1980. It features a striking, pyramidal design by Trevor Fiore. The exterior of the car incorporated flush glass panels, faired rear wheels, and butterfly doors. The roof of the Karin was only the size of an A3 sheet of paper due to its truncated pyramid shape. One of the Karin's most noticeable interior features was the unconventional three-seat layout, with the driver located in the middle of the two passengers.
