= Gilbern =

Gilbern Sports Cars (Components) Ltd
- Industry: Automobiles
- Founded: 1959
- Founders: Giles Smith; Bernard Friese
- Defunct: April 1973
- Fate: Bankrupt
- Headquarters: Llantwit Fardre, Pontypridd, Glamorgan, Wales
- Key people: Mike Leather (Director); Maurice Collings (Director)

Gilbern, Gilbern Sports Cars (Components) Ltd, was a Welsh car manufacturer from 1959 to 1973, based in Llantwit Fardre, Pontypridd, Glamorgan, Wales.

== History ==
Gilbern Sports Cars (Components) Ltd was founded by Giles Smith (previously a butcher, who died in 2003) and Bernard Friese, a German engineer with experience in glass fibre mouldings, and was one of the few cars to be made in Wales. Friese had made a one-off car for himself and the two partners used this as the basis for the first Gilbern car. The premises were a tiny workshop in Church Village, Pontypridd but when production started the business moved to a new location at the old Red Ash Colliery at nearby Llantwit Fardre. The cars were available at first only as kits but later complete cars were also available.

The name, Gilbern, was a combination of the first three letters of the name of founder Giles Smith and the first four letters of the name of his co-founder Bernard Friese.

Gilberns have often been entered in competition at the Wiscombe Park Hillclimb, first appearing there in 1962 in the hands of an Aston Martin Owners Club member.

The Society of Motor Manufacturers and Traders accepted Gilbern as a member in 1965, and the company was permitted to operate a stand at the British International Motor Show at Earls Court thereafter.

In 1968, following a search for a cash injection, Gilbern was taken over by Ace Capital Holdings Ltd, whose main business was the manufacture of slot machines. Following the takeover Giles Smith left the company to be replaced by Mike Leather and Maurice Collins as joint managing directors. In 1970 Ace was bought by entertainment group Mecca Ltd, who sold the company to Maurice Collins; in 1972 he in turn sold it to Mike Leather.

The cars were expensive for the time and became more so with 1973 taxation changes that added Value Added Tax to kit cars. Production ceased not long thereafter, also in 1973.

A one-off concept car, the T11, was produced, just prior to the company's closure, and was restored in 2009–10, appearing in some classic car articles in early 2010.

== Gilbern GT ==
Gilbern GT
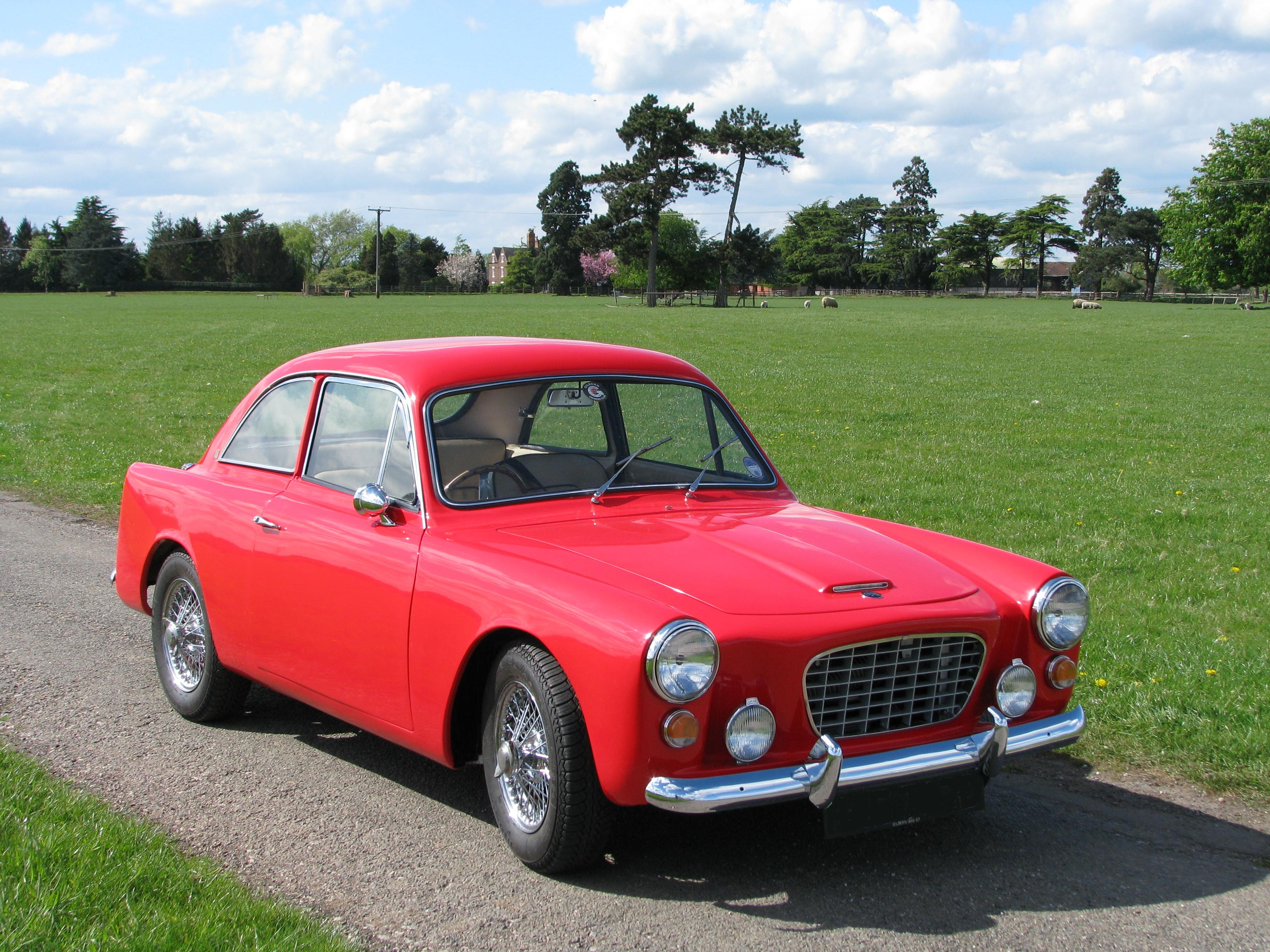
- Gilbern GT1800

Overview
- Manufacturer: Gilbern Sports Cars (Components) Ltd
- Production: 1959-1967; 280 made

Body and chassis
- Body style: 2-door coupé

Powertrain
- Engine: various

Dimensions
- Wheelbase: 93 in (2,400 mm)
- Length: 152 in (3,900 mm)
- Width: 60 in (1,500 mm)
- Height: 52 in (1,300 mm)

Chronology
- Successor: Gilbern Genie

The GT, a 2+2 two-door coupé was the company's first car and was made between 1959 and 1967. The GT Mk 1 was initially available with either 948 cc BMC A-Series engine with an optional Shorrock supercharger or Coventry Climax 1098 cc engines. The chassis was fabricated from square steel tubing and the front suspension was initially from the Austin A35. The body was a one-piece moulding. Although usually supplied in kit form, the body was provided fully trimmed and painted leaving the purchaser to only complete the mechanical items.

Later versions came with a B-series 1500 or 1600 cc MGA or 1800 cc MGB engine and coil-sprung BMC rear axle. With the coming of the larger engine, the car was renamed the GT1800.

A car with 1600 cc (ex MGA) engine was tested by the British The Motor magazine in 1961 and was found to have a top speed of 94.3 mph (151.8 km/h) and could accelerate from 0-60 mph (97 km/h) in 13.8 seconds. A fuel consumption of 35 miles per imperial gallon (8.1 L/100 km; 29 mpg_{‑US}) was recorded. The test car cost £978 including taxes of £251.

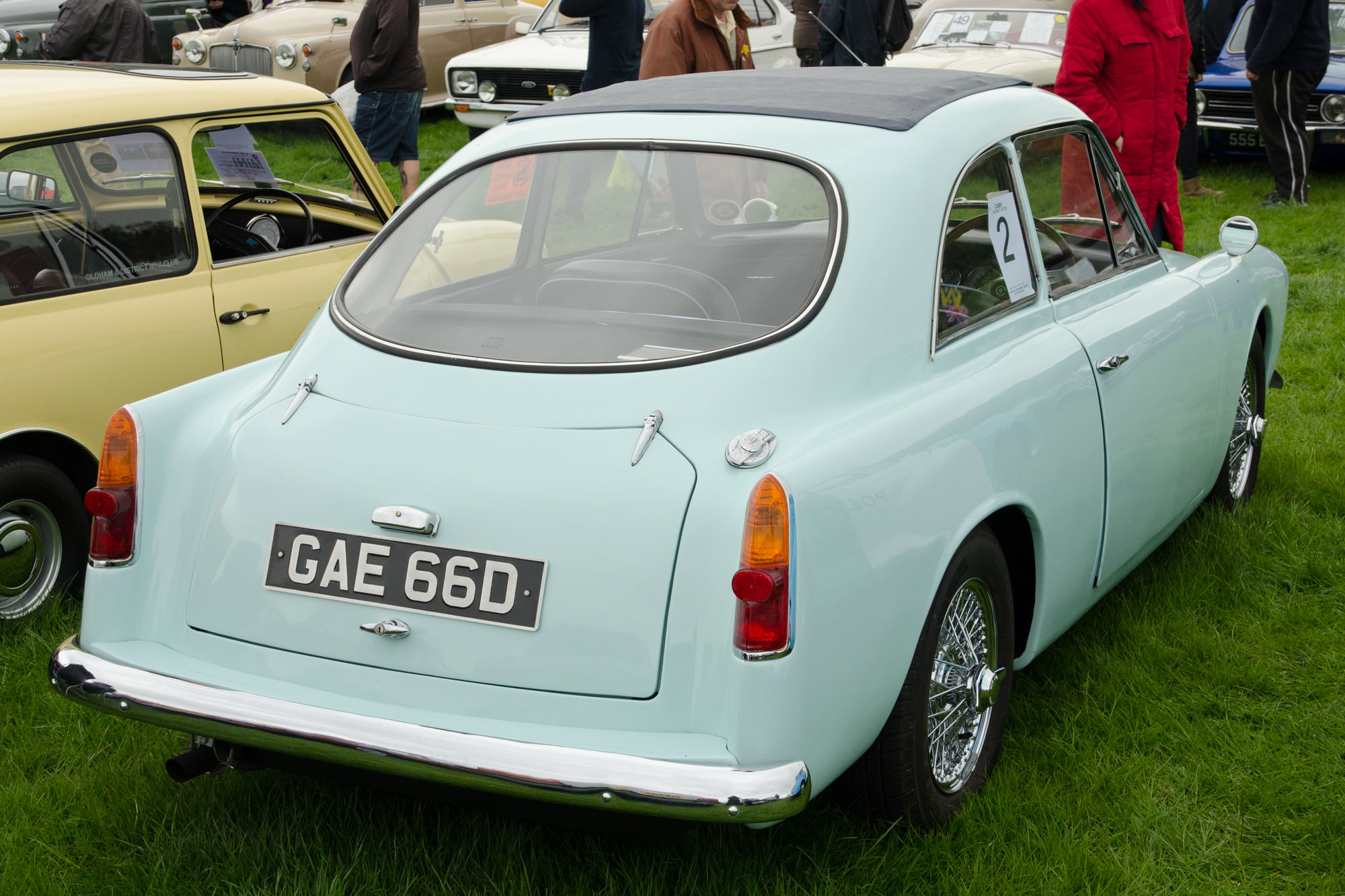
Rear

== Gilbern Genie ==
Gilbern Genie
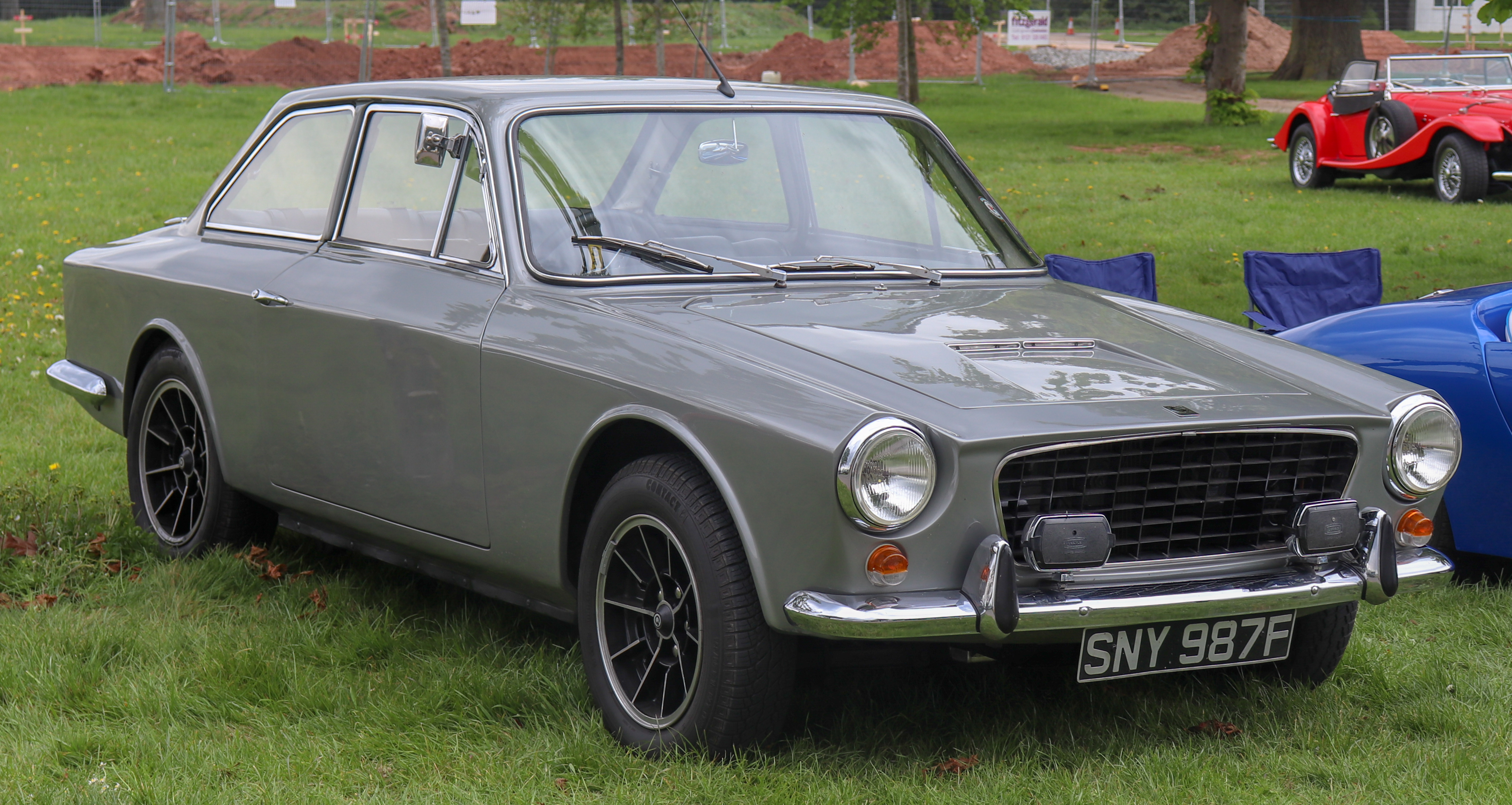
- Gilbern Genie

Overview
- Manufacturer: Gilbern Sports Cars (Components) Ltd
- Production: 1966-1969; 197 made

Body and chassis
- Body style: 2-door coupé

Powertrain
- Engine: Ford Essex V6 engine (2.5L or 3.0L)

Dimensions
- Wheelbase: 93 in (2,400 mm)
- Length: 159 in (4,000 mm)
- Width: 65 in (1,700 mm)

Chronology
- Successor: Gilbern Invader

In 1966 a larger, more up-market model, the Genie, appeared at the London Motor Show. It could be had with either a 2.5- or 3-litre Ford Essex V6 engine and gearbox with optional overdrive, but the steering and back axle were still BMC units from the MGB. The engine was fitted with a twin-choke Weber carburetor on most cars, although a small number were built with Tecalemit Jackson fuel injection. The rear suspension differed from the MG in having coil-spring/damper units and trailing arms. On early Genies, the rear axle was located with a Panhard rod, which was then changed to a Watts linkage on later examples.

The 2.5-litre version was dropped in 1968. In 1969, a complete car cost around £2000.

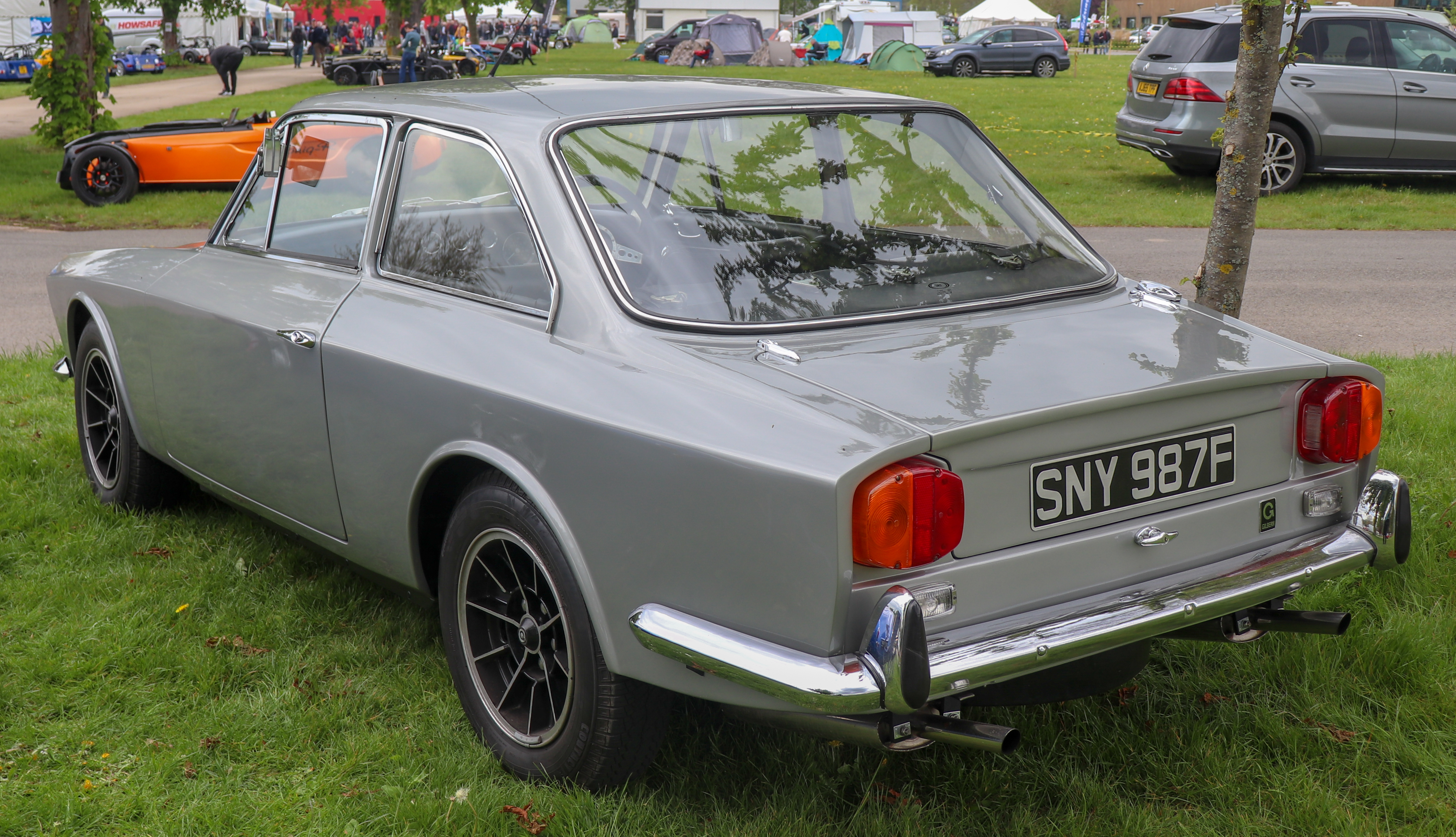
Rear

== Gilbern Invader ==
Gilbern Invader
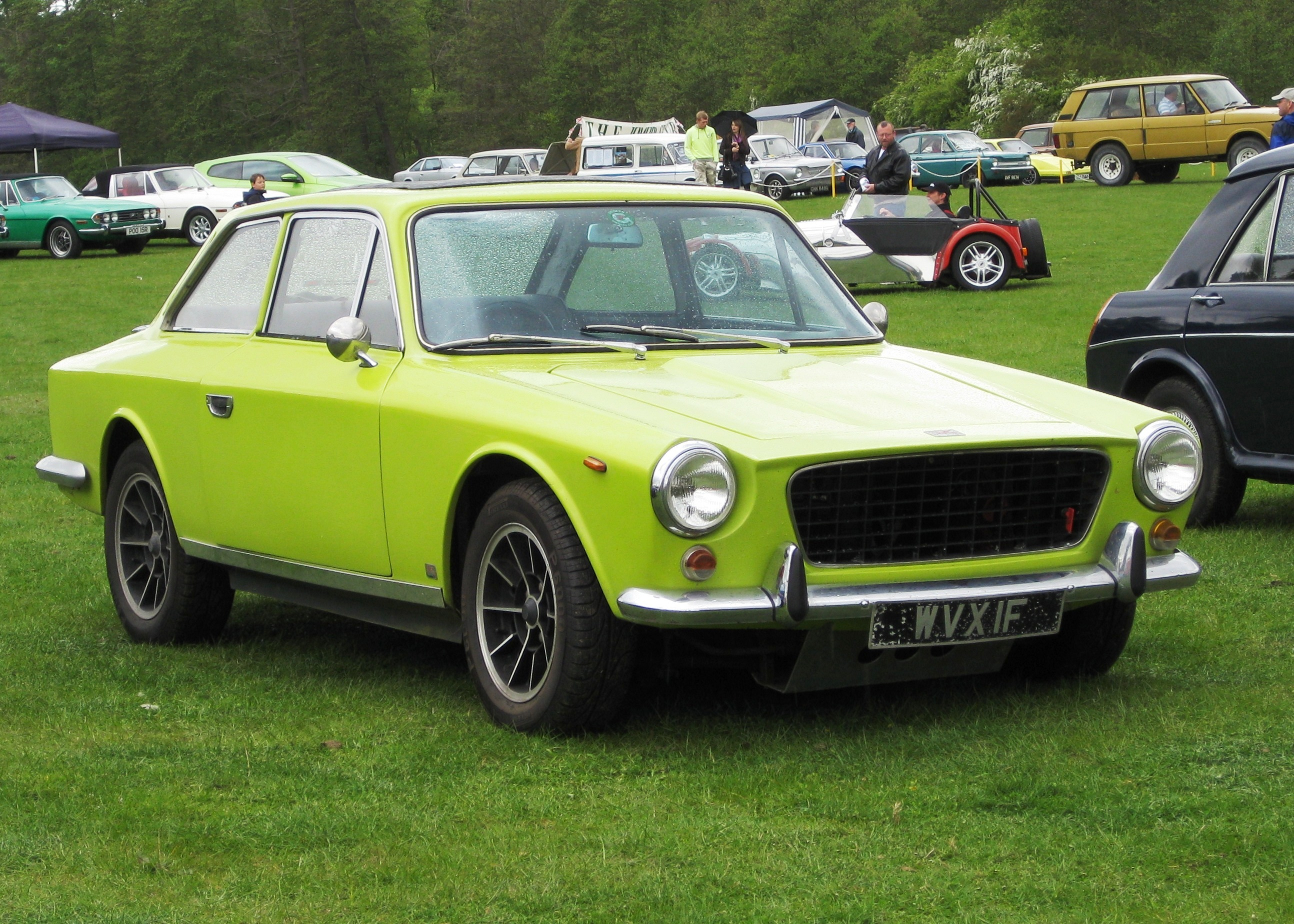

Overview
- Manufacturer: Gilbern Sports Cars (Components) Ltd
- Production: 1969-1973; 603 made

Body and chassis
- Body style: 2-door coupé, 3-door estate

Powertrain
- Engine: 2,994 cc Ford Essex V6
- Transmission: 4-speed manual all-synchromesh

Dimensions
- Wheelbase: 93 in (2,400 mm)
- Length: 159 in (4,000 mm)
- Width: 65 in (1,700 mm)
- Height: 51 in (1,300 mm)

Chronology
- Predecessor: Gilbern Genie

The final car was the Invader, introduced in July 1969 and based on the Genie but with an improved chassis and larger brakes. The front suspension now came from the MGC and the chassis was strengthened. It took the brand further upmarket with fittings such as electric windows and a walnut-veneered dashboard. The Invader was available as a complete car and from 1970 an estate version was also produced, though only 68 estates were built in total. Automatic or manual gearbox with overdrive were available.

A Mark II model was launched in October 1971 at the London Motor Show which was similar to the original 1969 model but with new reclining front seats.

Launched in September 1972, the Mk III version had Ford Cortina front suspension and was restyled front and rear, identified by the smaller grille caused by the front bumper height being increased and the indicators relocated under the bumper. The engine was the higher tune unit from the Ford Capri 3000GT. The body was produced using new moulds and was both wider and lower than that of the earlier Invader. Track was extended by four inches (10 cm). The wider axle led to wheel spats being added to the sides of the car. At the back the live rear axle was located by trailing links and a Panhard rod: adjustable shock absorbers were fitted all round.

The Mk III Invader was only available as a factory-built car and cost £2,693 in 1972.

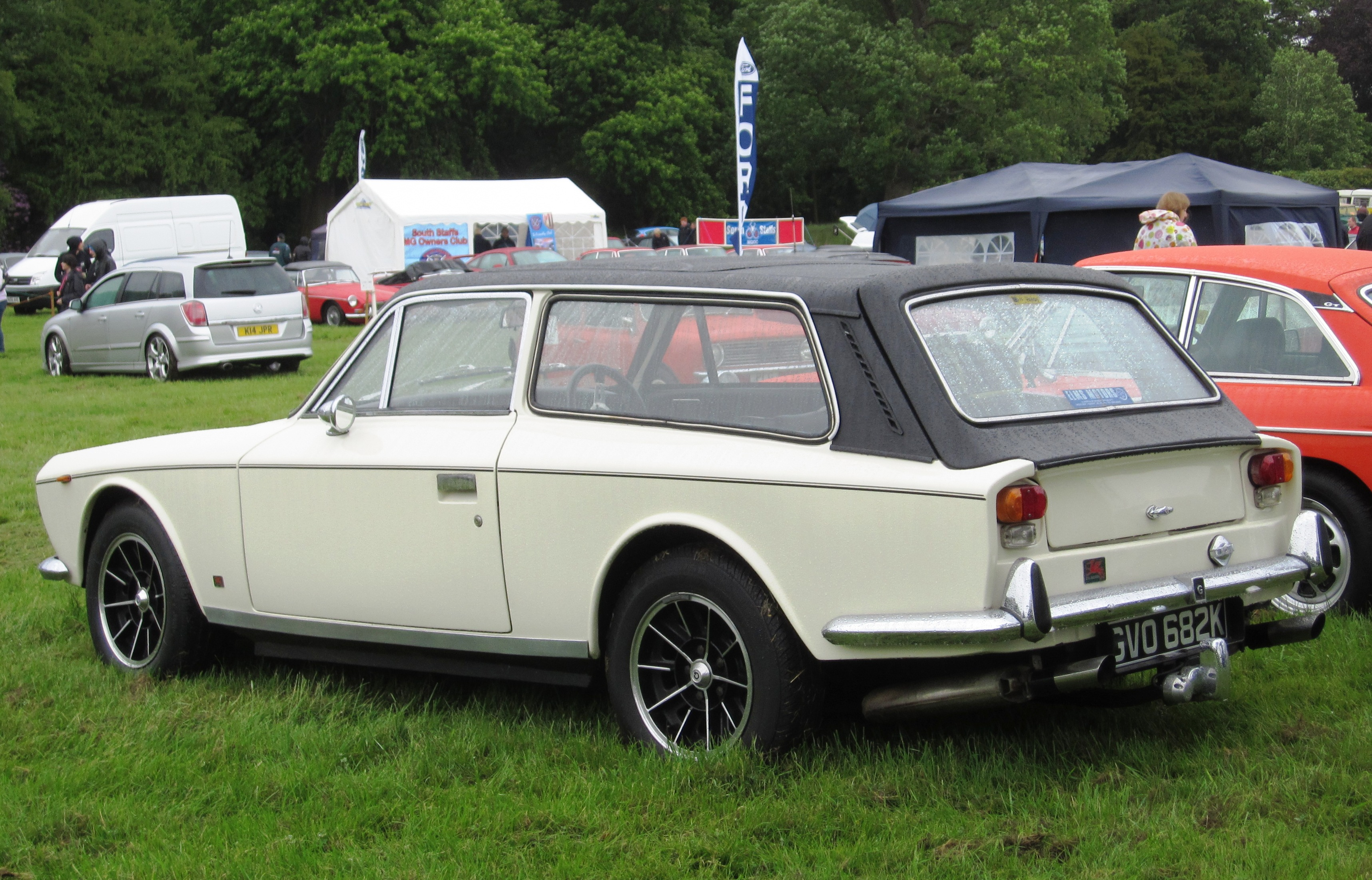
1971 Gilbern Invader Estate

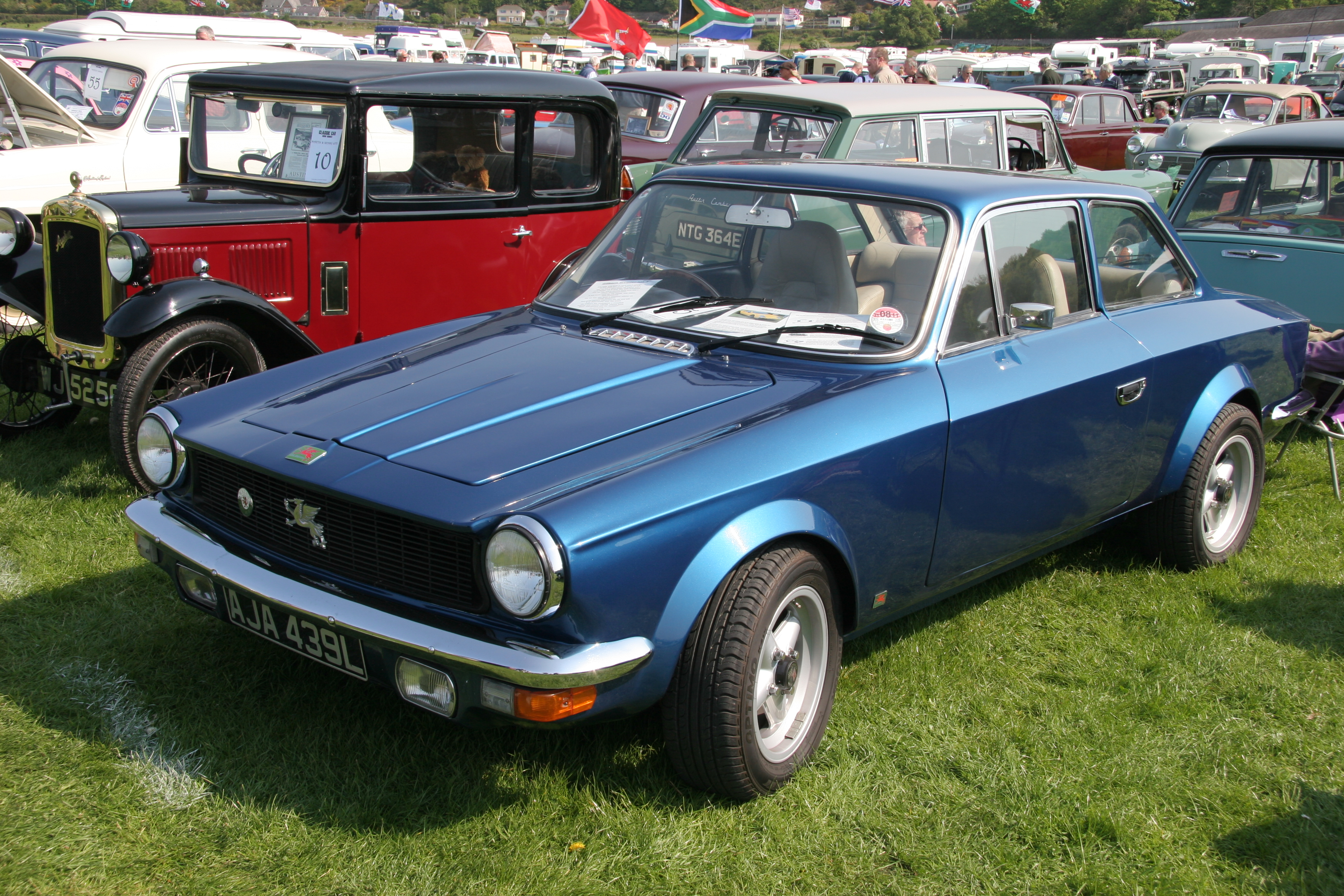
1973 Gilbern Invader Mk III

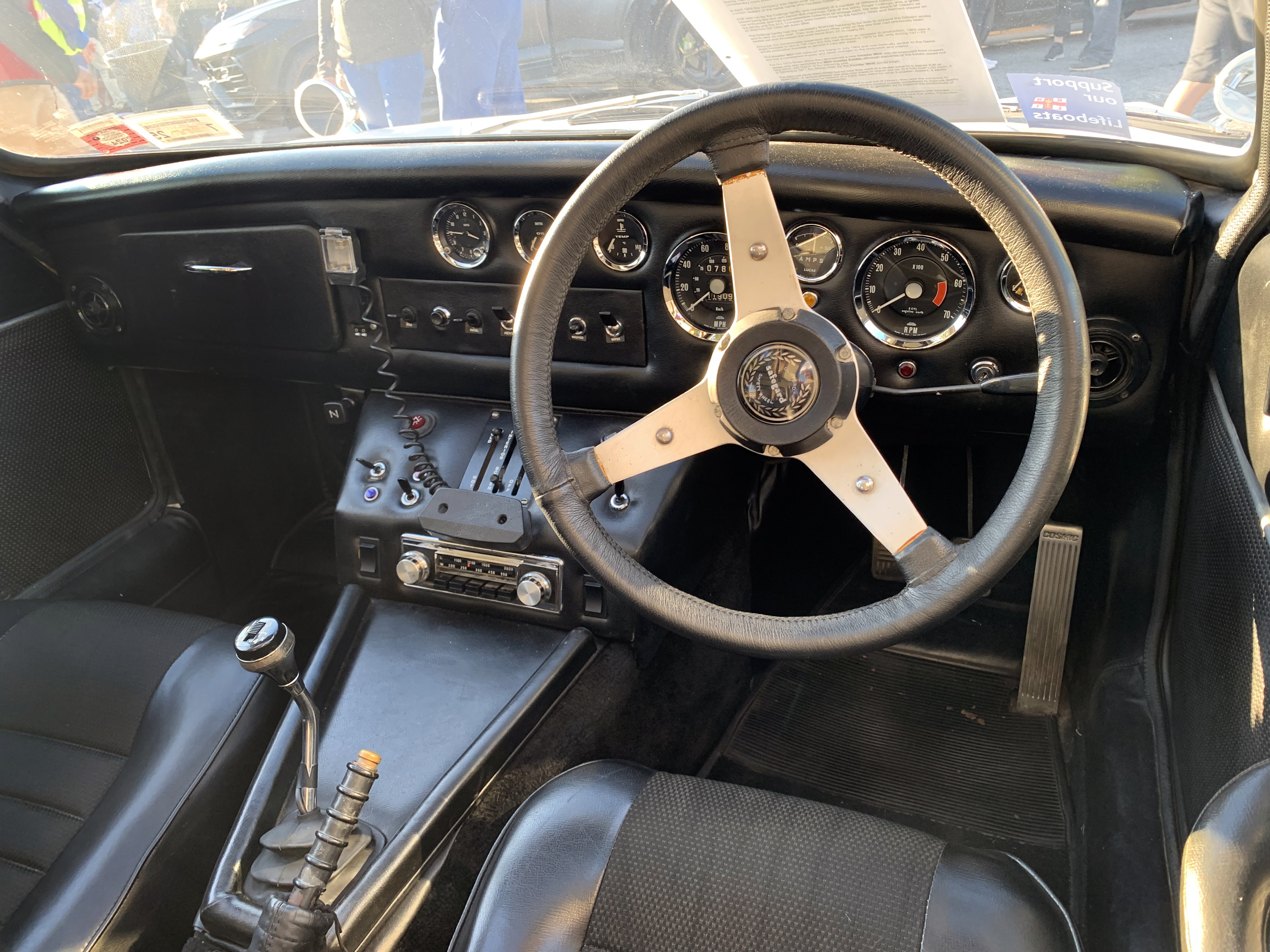
Interior (Mk II)

== T11 Concept ==
Gilbern T11
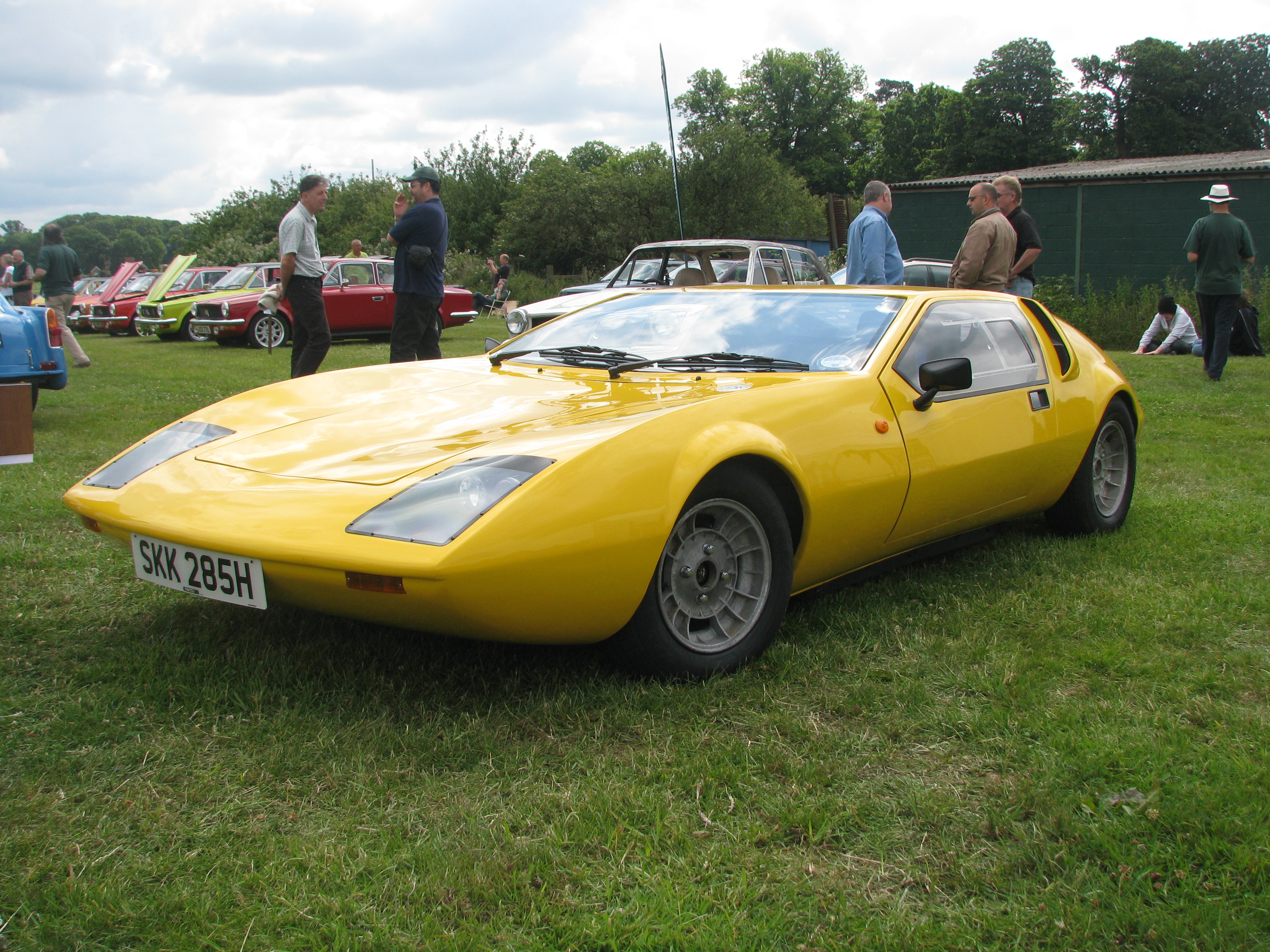

Overview
- Manufacturer: Gilbern Sports Cars (Components) Ltd
- Production: One example originally produced-2 cars later restored
- Designer: Trevor Fiore

Body and chassis
- Body style: 2-door coupé

Powertrain
- Engine: 1485 cc E-Series I4 (Austin Maxi)
- Transmission: Maxi 5-speed manual all-synchromesh

Designed by British designer Trevor Fiore, the T11 was built in 1970, and was due to show at the 1971 Geneva Motor Show. It was equipped with a lightly tuned 1.5-litre Austin Maxi drivetrain turned by 180 degrees. The company recalled the project, however. Three chassis were built but only one example was finished. These were restored and completed in 2009–2010.

== See also ==
- List of car manufacturers of the United Kingdom
