= Trevor Fiore =

Trevor Fiore (born Trevor Frost, 4 April 1937) is a former automobile designer of British origin. Fiore worked primarily in Italy in the 1960s and 1970s. From 1980 he was briefly head of design at Citroën.

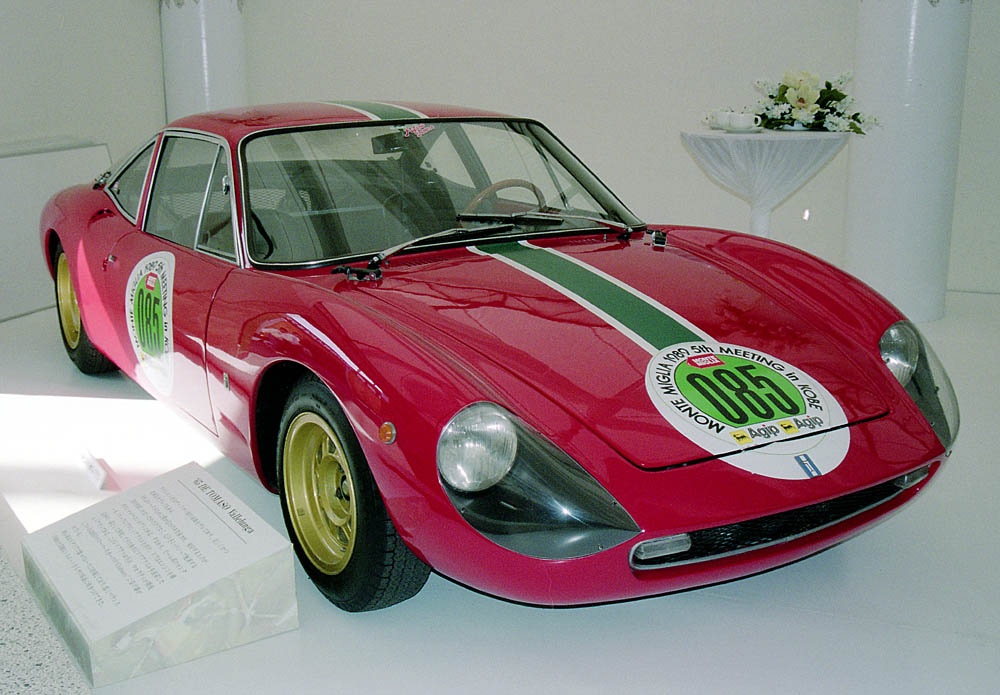
De Tomaso Vallelunga

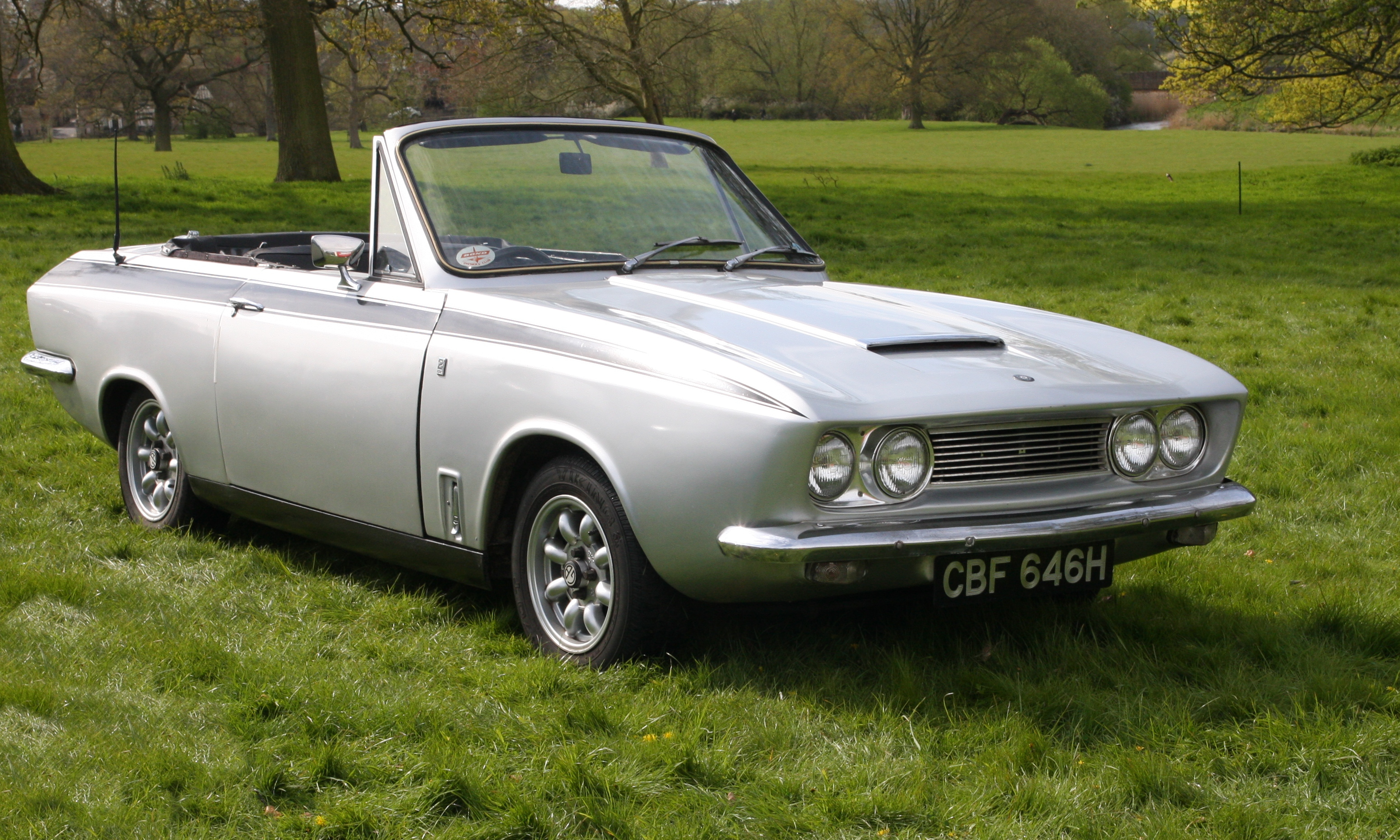
Bond Equipe

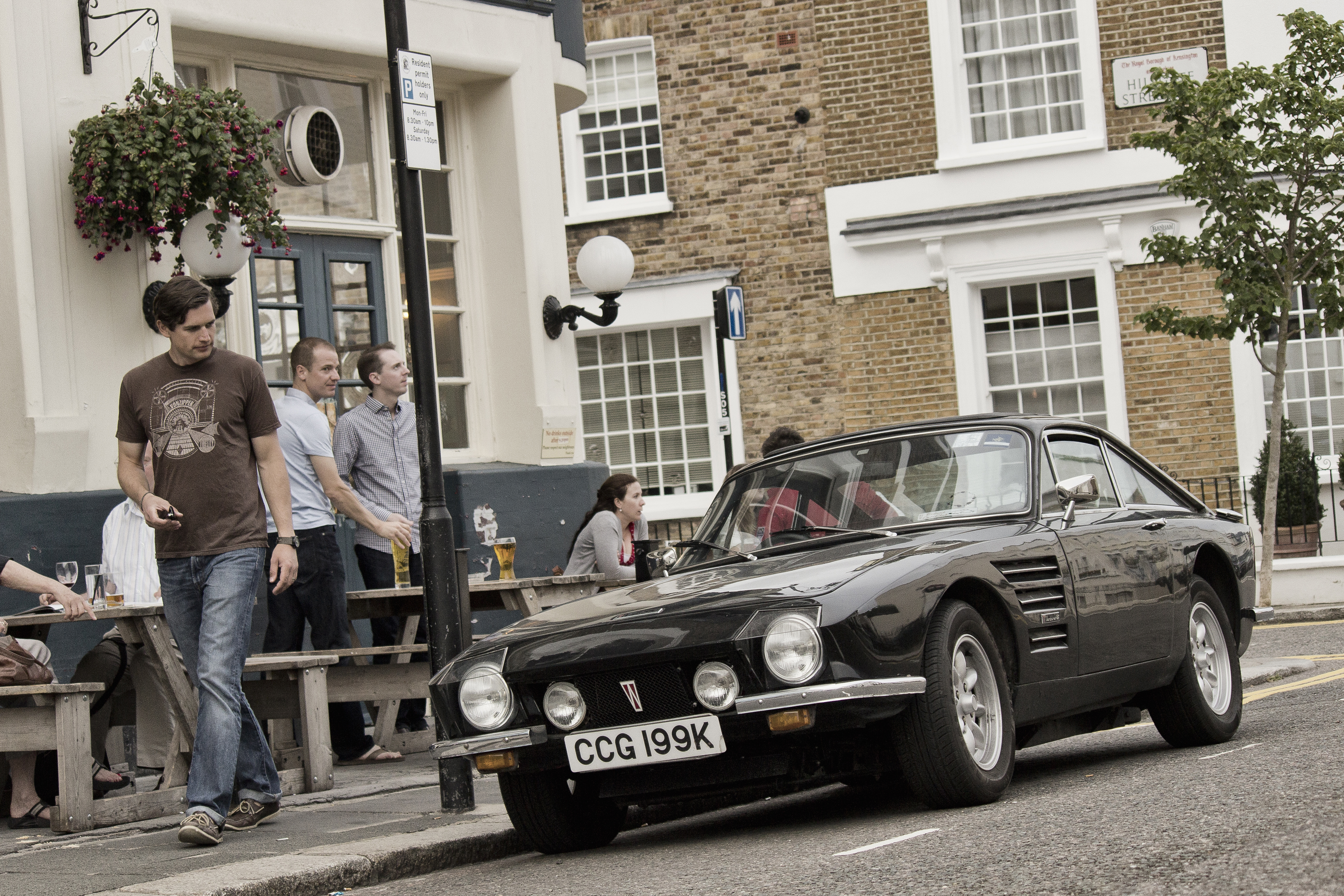
Trident Venturer

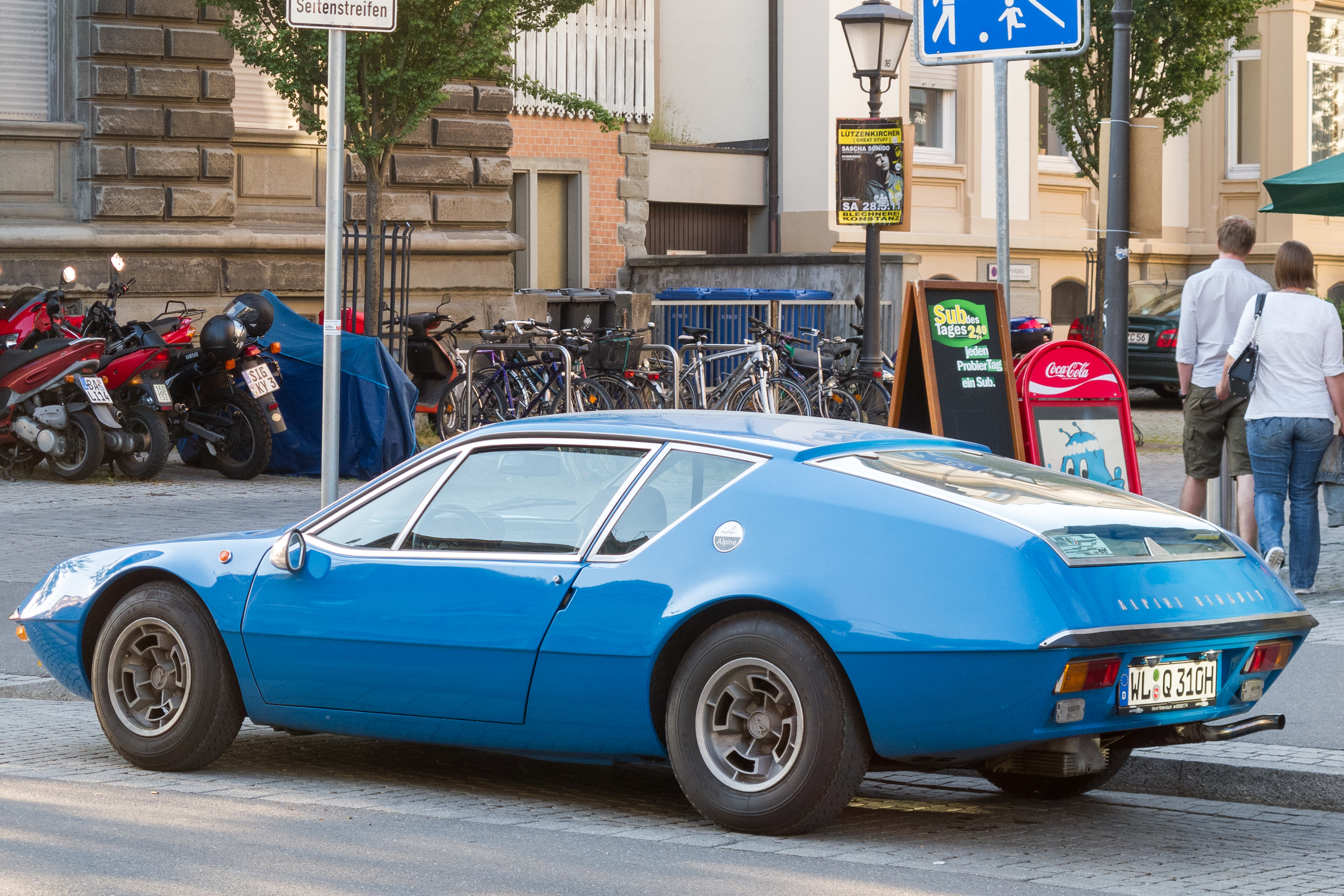
Alpine A310

Possibly from Fiore: Monteverdi 450 Hai

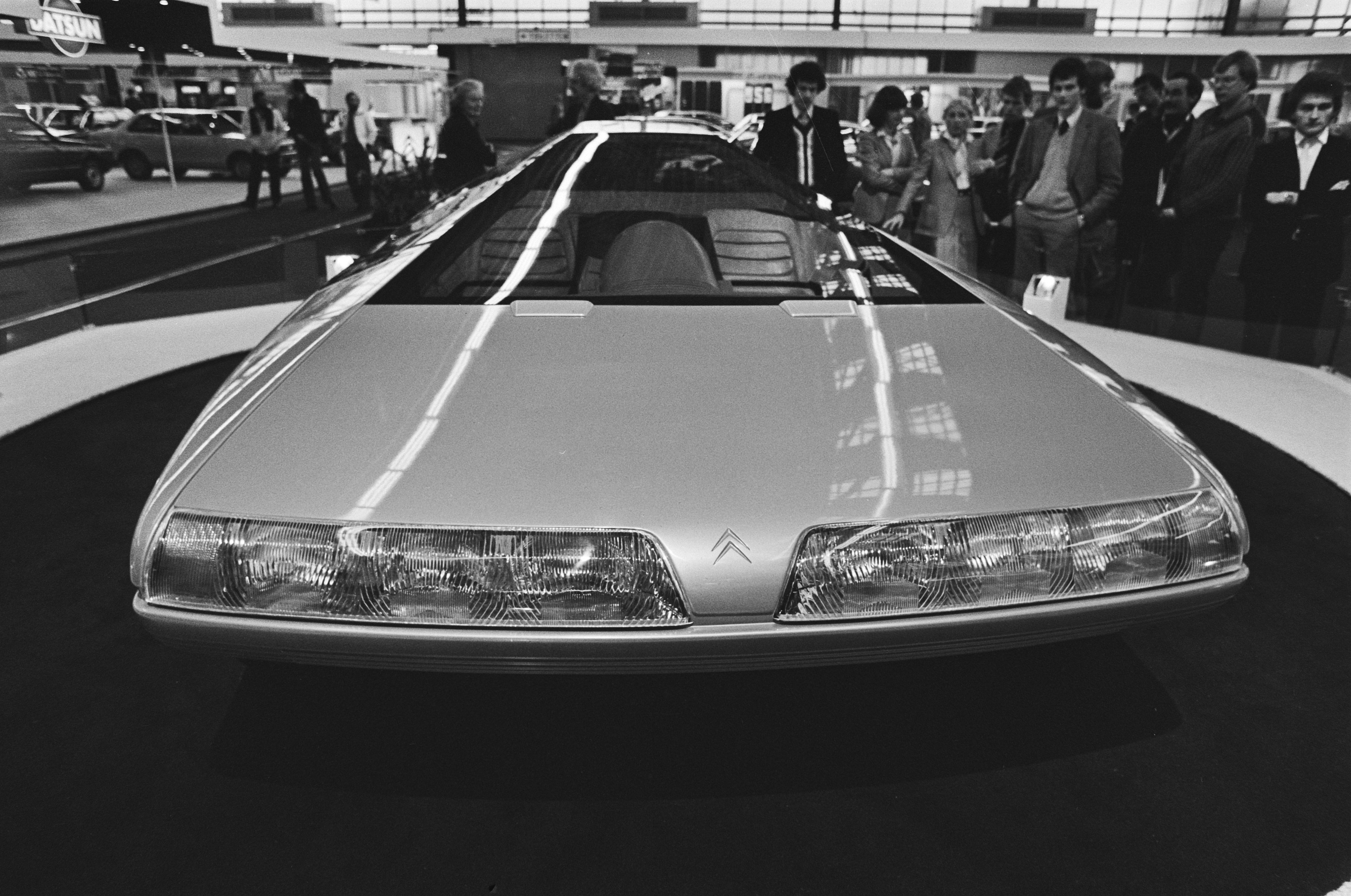
Citroën Karin

== Biography ==
Fiore was born Trevor Frost in Great Britain in 1937. His mother was of Italian descent; her parents came from Milan. In 1952 he began an apprenticeship as a mechanic at Standard Triumph. At the same time he took art courses in Birmingham, after which he got a job in Standard's design studio in 1956.

In 1962 he left Standard and briefly joined the Compagnie d'Esthétique Industrielle (CEI) in Paris, a studio of the French automobile designer Raymond Loewy. In 1964 he moved to Italy to the small Turin coachbuilder Fissore, where he became head of design. Since then he has used his mother's birth name. For Fissore he designed studies and series models, especially for smaller automobile manufacturers such as Alpine, Bond, De Tomaso, Elva, Trident and TVR. Fiore claimed that the body of the Swiss sports car Monteverdi Hai 450 was also based on his work, while its manufacturer Peter Monteverdi claimed authorship. Some reports confirm Fiore's thesis. Afterwards, Monteverdi, who had the bodies of his grand tourer High Speed 375 models manufactured at Fissore at the time, saw Fiore's designs for the Alpine A310 during a factory visit and adopted his lines for his Hai. Other sources go even further. They claim that the design of all Monteverdi models manufactured at Fissore came not from Peter Monteverdi himself, but from Trevor Fiore.

After Monteverdi's influence on Fissore increased in the early 1970s, Fiore separated from Fissore. As an independent designer, he developed studies for AC, Aston Martin, DAF, Gilbern and Volvo. During the development phase of the later Volvo 343, Fiore designed an alternative to the DAF factory's body design, but it did not succeed. The body manufacturer Coggiola in Beinasco often built the prototypes for his designs.

In January 1980, Fiore initially became a consultant to the French manufacturer Citroën, which had not had its own management staff in the design department for four years after the departure of its chief designer Robert Opron in the autumn of 1975. Six months later, Fiore took over the role of head of design at Citroën and expanded the in-house studio. Fiore presented several design studies in a short time, including the Citroën Karin and the Xenia project. In 1983, a Citroën design studio was created in Sophia Antipolis under Fiore's leadership.

After a short time, Fiore separated from Citroën. In 1991 he was briefly associated with Romano Artioli's newly founded company Bugatti Automobili, but was unable to influence the design of the models.

Since then, Fiore has completely withdrawn from the automotive sector.

== Fiore's designs ==
- Alpine A310
- Alpine A310 Special (Coggiola)
- Bond Equipe 2 litre
- Citroën Karin
- Citroën Xenia
- Coggiola Sylvia
- De Tomaso Vallelunga
- Elva GT160
- Gilbern T11
- Trident Clipper
- TVR Tina (prototype)
