= Ford Essex V6 engine (UK) =

Ford Essex V6
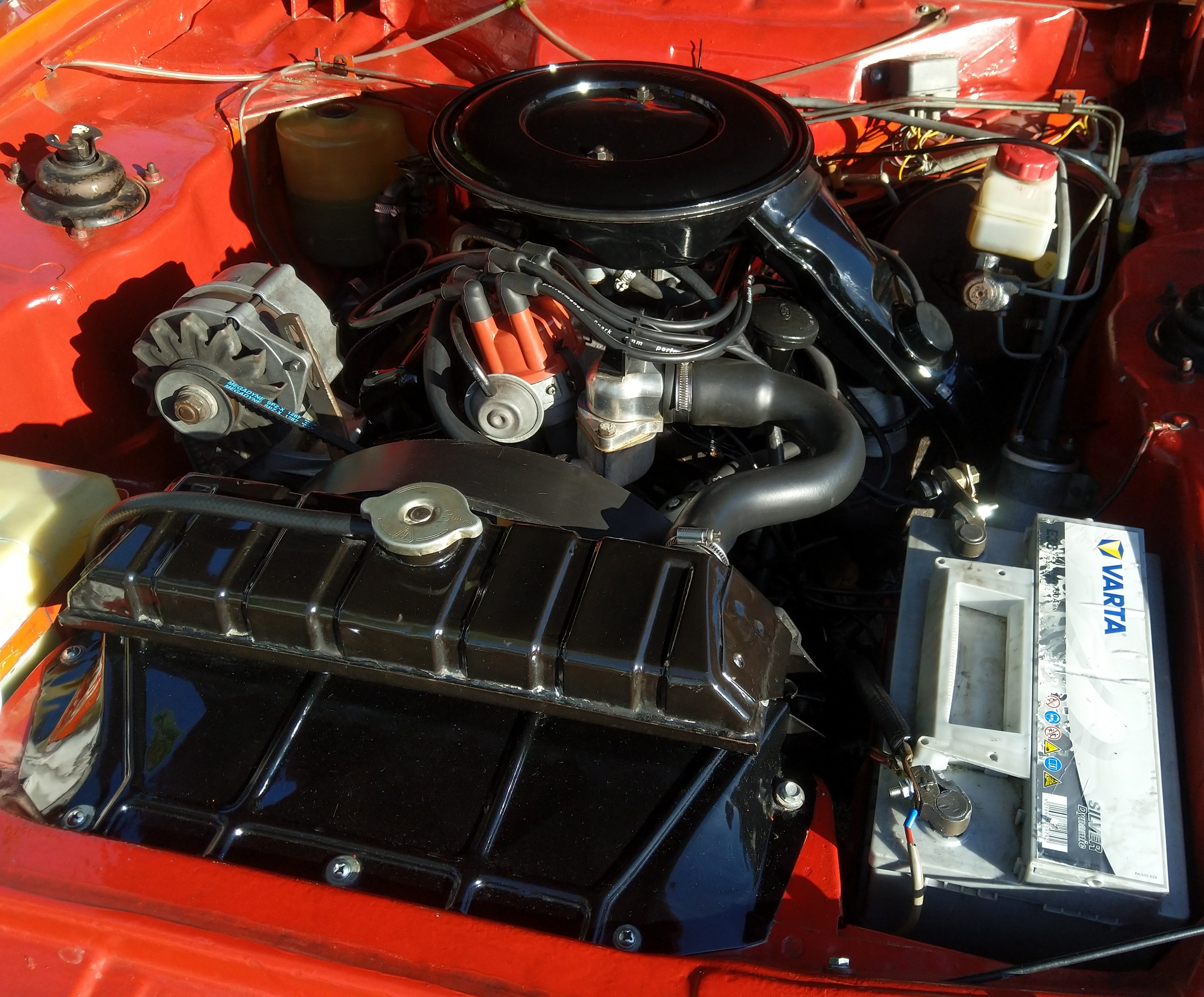

Overview
- Manufacturer: Ford Motor Company
- Production: 1966 – 1988 UK; 1982 – 2000 SA

Layout
- Configuration: 60° V6; Firing order: 1-4-2-5-3-6 (Even Firing)
- Displacement: 2.5 L (2,495 cc; 152.3 cu in); 3.0 L (2,994 cc; 182.7 cu in); 3.1 L (3,098 cc; 189.1 cu in); 3.4 L (3,375 cc; 206.0 cu in); 3.4 L (3,412 cc; 208.2 cu in)
- Cylinder bore: 93.67 mm (3.688 in); 94.67 mm (3.727 in) (3.4 L); 95.25 mm (3.750 in) (3.1 L); 100 mm (3.94 in) (GAA)
- Piston stroke: 60.19 mm (2.370 in) (2.5 L); 72.42 mm (2.851 in) (3.0 L); 80 mm (3.15 in) (3.4 L)
- Cylinder block material: Cast iron
- Cylinder head material: Cast iron LM 25 Aluminium alloy (Cosworth GAA)
- Valvetrain: OHV 12 valve (2 per cylinder); Solid flat tappet lifters 41.1 mm (1.62 in) inlet valves 37 mm (1.5 in) exhaust valves SA 3.4 L: 43 mm (1.7 in) inlet valves 37 mm (1.5 in) exhaust valves Capri X pack: 44.5 mm (1.75 in) inlet valves 41.3 mm (1.63 in) exhaust valves DOHC 24 valve (4 per cylinder) – Cosworth GAA
- Valvetrain drive system: Gears
- Compression ratio: 8.0:1 (TVR 3000S turbo); 8.9:1 (standard pre-1971); 9.0:1 (standard after 1971); 9.1:1 (Ford Capri X-Pack 3.0); 9.5:1 (Ford Sierra 3.0 Sapphire); 10.0:1 (Cosworth 3.4 GAA)

Combustion
- Supercharger: Aftermarket
- Turbocharger: Broadspeed single Roto-Master (TVR 3000M & aftermarket)
- Fuel system: 2.5 L : Ford 1250 1bbl carburetor 3.0 L : Ford 1250 1bbl carburetor 40 DFAV 2bbl Weber carburetor 38 DGAS 2bbl Weber carburetor 40 DFI 5 2bbl Weber carburetor Electronic fuel injection x3 42 DCNF 2bbl Weber carburetors 3.1 L : 38 DGAS 2bbl Weber carburetor SA 3.4 L : 38 DGAS 2bbl Weber carburetor Cosworth GAA 3.4 L : Lucas Mechanical fuel injection
- Fuel type: Petrol (leaded)
- Oil system: Wet sump (stock); Dry sump (Cosworth GAA)
- Cooling system: Jacketed block (stock)

Output
- Power output: 118–462 hp (88–345 kW; 120–468 PS)
- Torque output: 132–300 lb⋅ft (179–407 N⋅m)

Dimensions
- Dry weight: 170 kg (370 lb)

The Ford Essex V6 engine is a 60° V6 engine built between 1966 and 1988 by the Ford Motor Company in the United Kingdom in the Ford engine plant of Dagenham, Essex, which gave the engine its name (some were built until 2000 in South Africa). It is closely related to the Ford Essex V4 engine produced in displacements of 1.7 L and 2.0 L. Both engines share many parts since the Essex V6 was directly derived from the Essex V4; the 2.0 L Essex V4 and the 3.0 L Essex V6 in fact have exactly the same bore and stroke and share various components. The Ford Cologne V6 engine was built by Ford in Germany at the same time, and eventually replaced the Essex.

== History ==
The Essex V4 and V6 were mainly designed to replace the outdated and ageing inline-four and six-cylinder Ford Zephyr engines. It was produced in four capacities: 2.5 L (2,495 cc; 152.3 cu in), 3.0 L (2,994 cc; 182.7 cu in), 3.1 L (3,098 cc; 189.1 cu in), 3.4 L (3,412 cc; 208.2 cu in), with the 3.0-litre version being the most common and widely used. These engines were fitted to a wide range of vehicles, from Ford Transit vans to sedans, coupés like the Ford Capri and sports cars like TVRs and Marcos.

The earlier versions of engine were rated at 128 hp (95 kW; 130 PS) and 173 lb⋅ft (235 N⋅m) of torque, around October 1971 the engine was revised by modifying the camshaft and cylinder heads which improved the power and torque to produce 157 hp (117 kW; 159 PS) SAE or 138 hp (103 kW; 140 PS) DIN at 5000 rpm and 192 lb⋅ft (260 N⋅m) SAE or 174 lb⋅ft (236 N⋅m) DIN of torque at 3000 rpm. At the same time, the oil dipstick was moved from the front of the engine to the side, the inlet manifold was improved from earlier models, and the compression ratio was raised slightly from 8.9:1 to 9.0:1 due to a change of the piston design.

The shape of the inlet ports was also changed from an O-port design to a D-port design which improved the flow characteristics of the heads, the old 40 DFAV Weber carburetor that was prone to over-fueling and resulting bore wash was replaced by the 38 DGAS Weber carburetor, the air filter housing was also changed and later around 1976 a hot air intake was added consisting of a metal pipe running from the top of a plate welded on the exhaust manifold or header to an opening in the air intake to prevent the carburetor from icing and making the engine warm up more quickly. The carburetor was also modified again, a return-style fuel system was adopted and a vacuum-operated choke in the air filter housing were also added. This, and a positive crankcase ventilation (PCV) system were also early forms of emissions control.

The camshaft gear was also made slightly stronger by using steel with nylon teeth instead of being completely made from nylon as on previous ones. Aftermarket steel, aluminium, and alloy gears have been produced as replacements to prevent the gear from stripping its teeth: this is commonly due to overheating causing the nylon to weaken. This is one of the two major weak points of the Essex V-engines, the other being the hexagonal oil pump spindle / shaft which can round off, or even break.

The 2.5 L engine was rated at 137 hp (102 kW; 139 PS) SAE gross or 120 hp (89 kW; 122 PS) DIN and peak torque was rated at 145 lb⋅ft (197 N⋅m) SAE gross or 132 lb⋅ft (179 N⋅m) DIN. The 2.5-litre version ended production in 1977 along with the Essex V4 engine. The 3.1 L (3,098 cc; 189.1 cu in) V6 engine as used in the Ford Capri RS 3100 was essentially a 3.0 L engine bored out by 1.6 mm (0.06 in) or 60 thousandths of an inch from 93.6 mm (3.69 in) to 95.25 mm (3.75 in). It was capable of 148 bhp (150 PS; 110 kW) at 5000 rpm and 187 lb⋅ft (254 N⋅m) of torque at 3000 rpm. It featured blue rocker covers in order to distinguish the engine from the usual 3.0 L engine and it also featured hand-polished and ported inlet and exhaust ports. Only 250 RS 3100s were produced for homologation purposes, making original 3.1-litre engines very rare, although modified engines bored +0.60 are common, one of the first 50 engines which was in a RS 3100 that was free for car magazines to review and test in fact had 165 hp (123 kW; 167 PS) instead of the 148 hp (110 kW; 150 PS) of the rest of road going RS 3100s, this was achieved with a higher lift camshaft. These figures vary somewhat depending on the source.

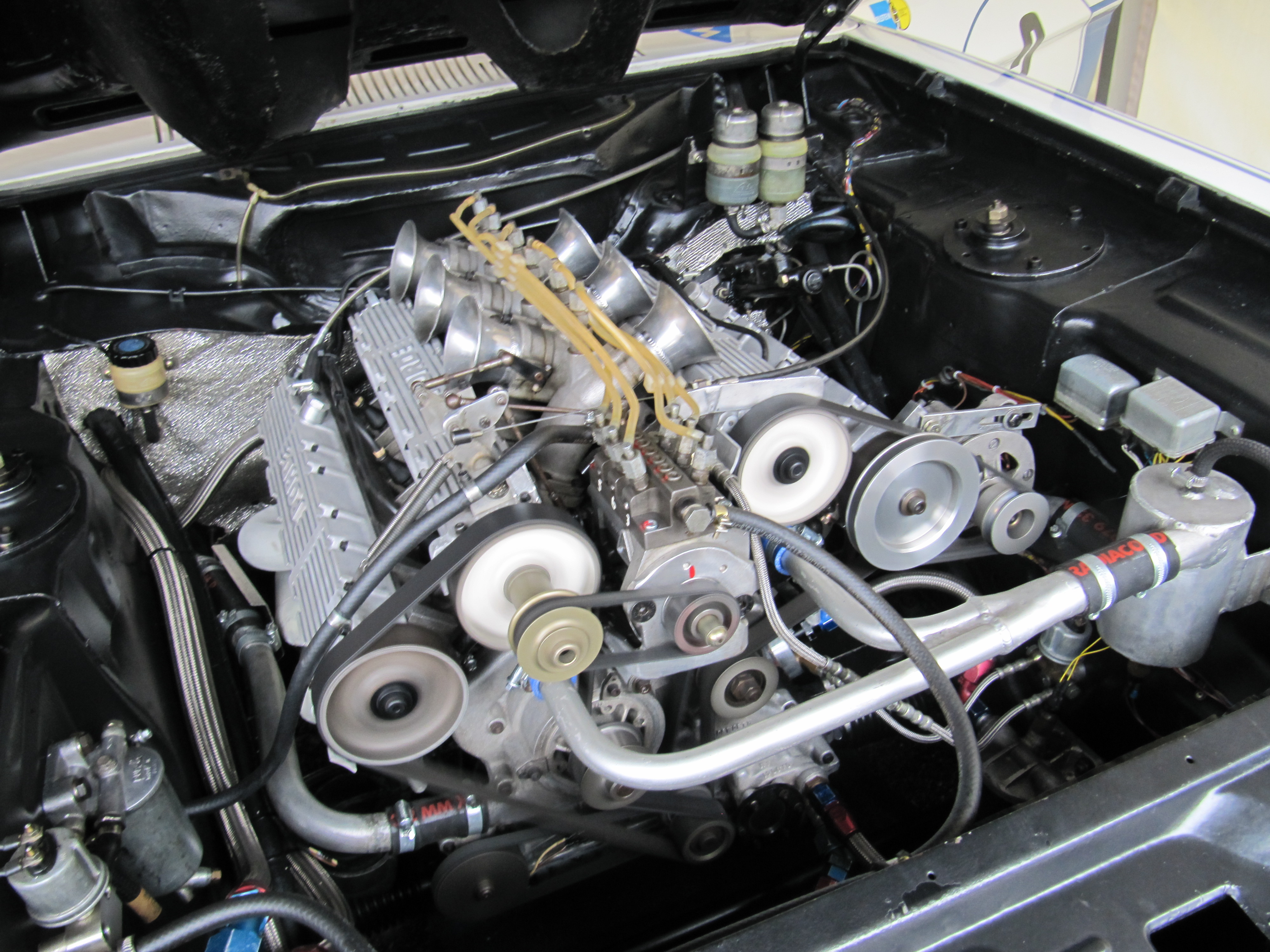
Essex V6-based Cosworth GAA

The Essex V6 also formed the base for the 3.4 L Cosworth GAA born in May 1972 and designed by Mike Hall, also responsible for designing Cosworth's famous DFV Engine. The GAA had the benefit of 100 mm (3.94 in) bores, DOHC aluminium alloy heads, Lucas mechanical fuel injection, a dry sump oiling system and a steel crankshaft and generated 462 bhp (345 kW; 468 PS) at 9,000 rpm and 300 lb⋅ft (407 N⋅m) of torque. Mike Hall's intention was to design the cylinder heads so that 3 spark plugs per cylinder could be fitted, but this idea was dropped since there was no appreciable increase in power or torque. The original objective was an engine with a minimum of 400 bhp (298 kW; 406 PS); this objective was exceeded, with the engine making 420 bhp (313 kW; 426 PS) in the first test run. This engine was used in the racing version of the Capri RS 3100, competing successfully in the European Touring Car Championship, as well as in Formula 5000 single-seaters. One hundred kits were also sold by Ford Motorsport.

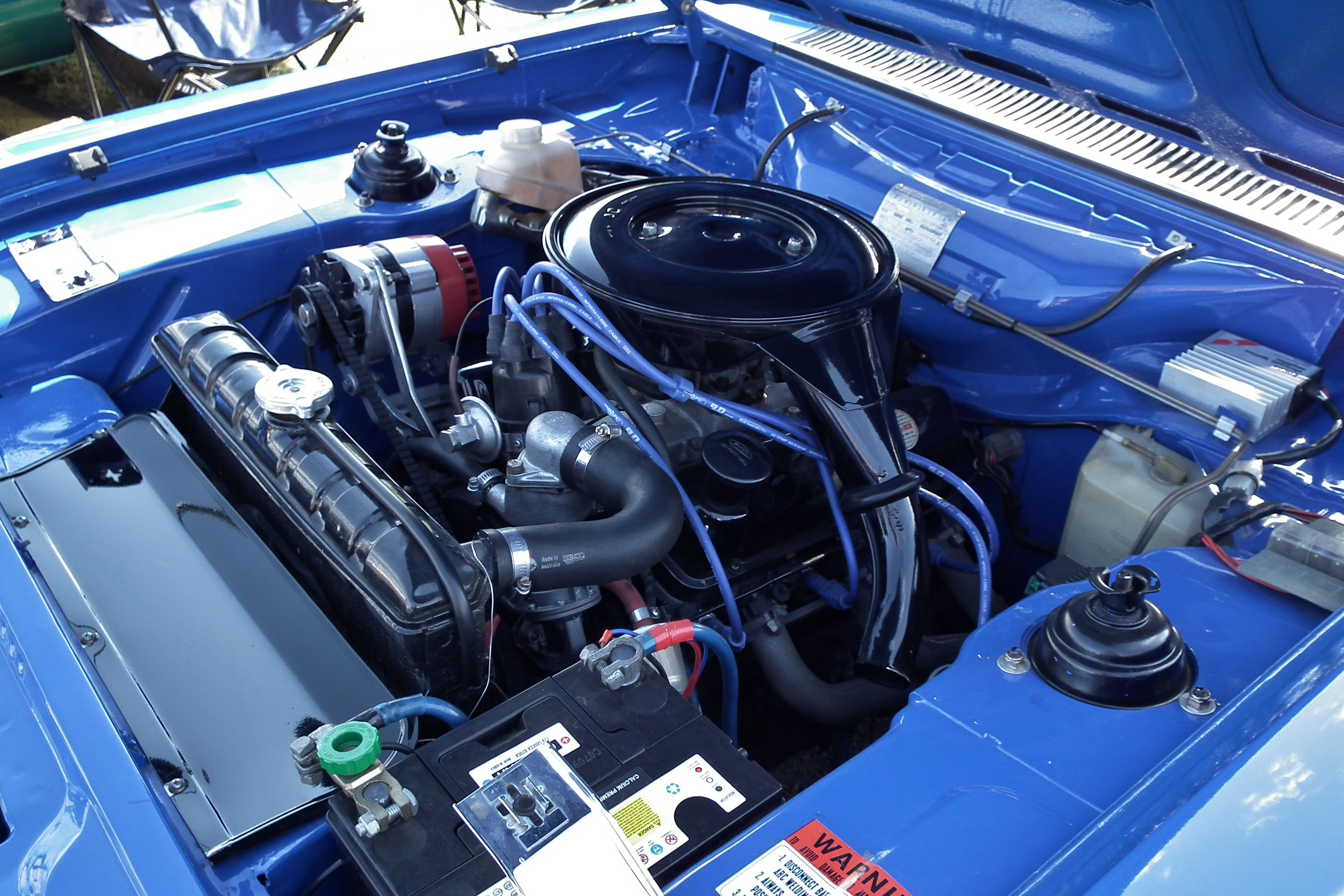
Pre-October 1971 version of the Essex V6

Ford RS dealerships also offered a number of performance modifications for the Essex V6, called the "GP1" (Group 1) and "Series X", the GP1 package offered a 40 DFI5 Weber carburetor, a camshaft kit, larger, 44.5 mm (1.75 in), inlet and 41.3 mm (1.63 in) exhaust valves, double valve springs, specially selected connecting rods and forged high compression pistons giving a power output of around 170 bhp (127 kW; 172 PS). The Series X modifications offered the same larger inlet and exhaust valves as the GP1, but also offered a new inlet manifold designed for three twin-choke 42 DCNF Weber carburetors fed by an electric fuel pump which boosted power up to 185 bhp (138 kW; 188 PS) and 195 lb⋅ft (264 N⋅m), however the standard camshaft was retained.

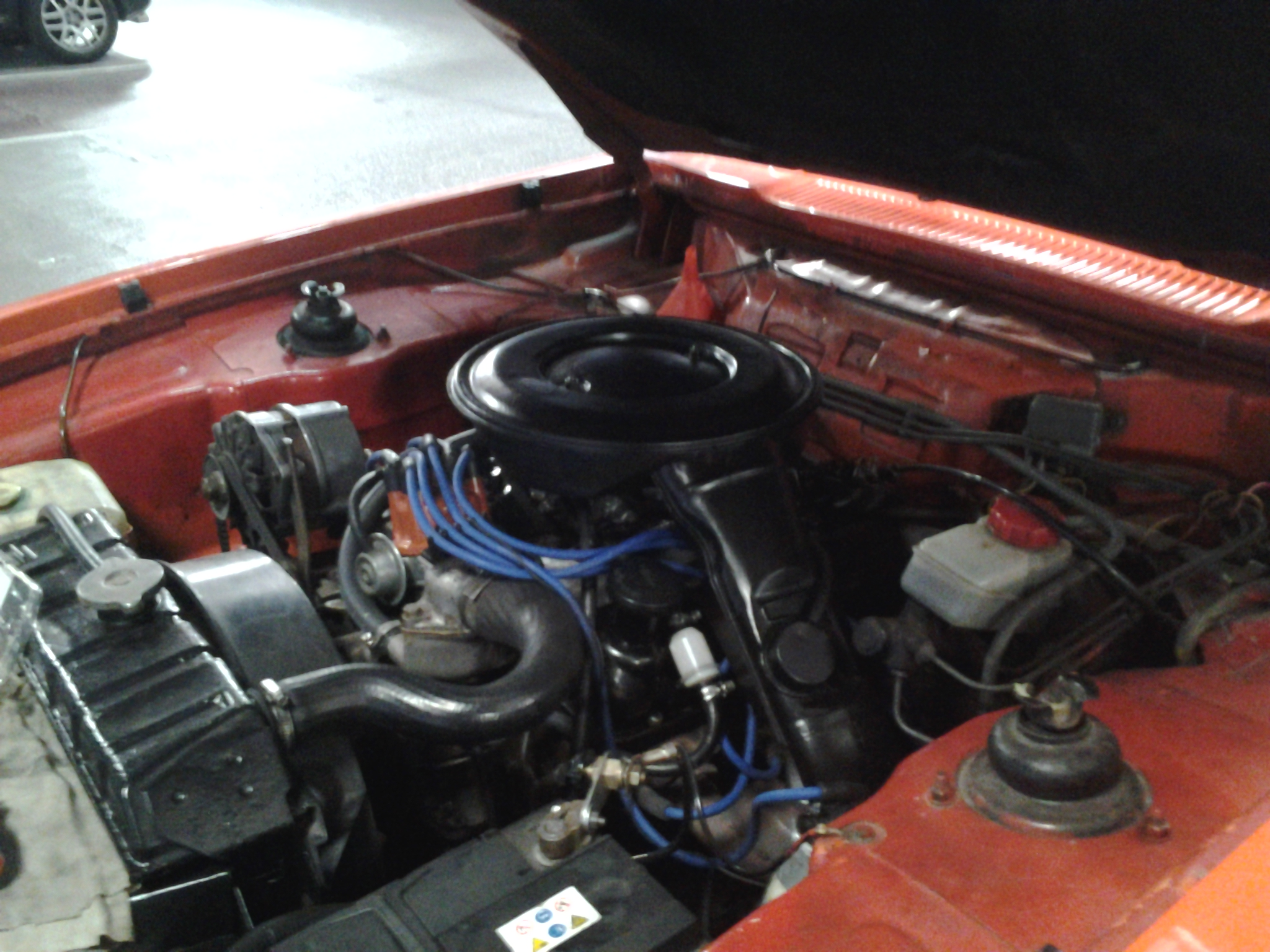
Post-October 1971 version of the Essex V6

Earlier versions of the 3.0-litre engine (pre-October 1971) were fueled by a twin-choke 40 DFAV Weber carburetor, which had some inherent faults in its design which caused it to run too rich and cause bore wash. It was subsequently replaced by a more modern twin-choke 38 DGAS Weber carburetor which effectively solved the problems of the earlier carburetors, and was used for the 3-litre V6 until the end of its production. The 2.5-litre V6 used a single barrel Ford carburetor which was also used in the low-compression variants of the 3.0-litre Essex V6 used in the Ford Transit. Unusually, the Essex V6 was designed so that the same block could serve in both diesel (compression ignition) and petrol applications, although the diesel version never reached production. Traces of its diesel design lie in the very heavy construction using Heron cylinder heads and the necessity for dished pistons to decrease compression for the petrol engine. The cast iron Essex V6 is a heavy engine due to its sturdy design, weighing 170 kg (370 lb), 56 lb (25 kg) more than the aluminium alloy Rover V8, for example, the Essex V6 also has a very heavy yet sturdy four-main bearing crossplane crankshaft with large 63.52 mm (2.501 in) main journals, and a heavy flywheel in order to smooth out the power delivery, sometimes Essex V6 engines are referred to as an "Essex lump" referring to the weight of these engines. In spite of its heaviness, the Essex V6 was used as the main workhorse and a high performance option for medium to full-sized cars like the Capri the Granada and Transit. Ford supplied Essex V6-powered Transit vans to the police and ambulance services in the UK from the late 1960s until 1989, when it was replaced by more modern engines such as the fuel injected 2.8 and 2.9 L Ford Cologne V6 engine although the Essex V6 was even used until April 2000 in South Africa.

TVR contracted the company Broadspeed to develop a turbocharging system for their TVR 3000S turbo. In lieu of fuel injection, the carburettor was run inside a pressurized box atop the engine, and the turbocharger itself was mounted low and forward in the engine compartment, requiring the exhaust manifolds to exit forward. The compression ratio was lowered from 9.0:1 to 8.0:1 to reduce the engine's internal stresses. Turbocharging substantially increased horsepower, from 138 to 230 hp (140 to 233 PS; 103 to 172 kW) and torque from 182 to 273 lb⋅ft (247 to 370 N⋅m).

Broadspeed also designed a turbocharging system for the Mk1 Ford Capri 3.0, available since early 1970 these Capris were known as "Broadspeed Bullet Capris". The engine was heavily modified and included modified cylinder heads, a high-lift camshaft, a re-jetted carburetor, a completely blueprinted rotating assembly, lowered 8.2:1 compression ratio, a modified inlet manifold and exhaust system using a single turbocharger. Their power was substantially increased (by 63%) from 138 to 218 hp (140 to 221 PS; 103 to 163 kW). Similar to the TVR 3000S' turbocharging system, it used a "blow-through carburettor" system in which the standard but re-jetted 38 DGAS Weber carburetor was run inside a pressurised airbox. Performance figures further increased with the uprated post-October 1971 versions of the engine. The company Janspeed, well known for their high performance exhaust systems, also designed a turbocharging system for the Ford Essex 3.0 L and 1.6 – 2.0 L OHC engines, although these were much simpler than the turbocharging system offered by Broadspeed, Janspeed promised a 25% increase in horsepower, boosting the engine's power output from 138 hp (140 PS; 103 kW) to around 172 hp (174 PS; 128 kW) using a single Roto-Master turbocharger mounted directly on top of the left bank of the engine providing 5 psi (0.34 bar) of boost.

The 2.5 L and 3.0 L engines share the same block, connecting rods and 93.66 mm (3.69 in) bore, differing only in crank throw and pistons, 3.0 L pistons have a length of 95 mm (3.74 in) and 2.5 L pistons have a length of 100 mm (3.94 in) / 101 mm (3.98 in) .

Companies like Specialised Engines, Essex engines and Ric Wood have professionally built and developed large displacement 3.2 L, 3.4 L and even 4.0 L conversions and forced induction conversions for the Essex V6 with power outputs reaching as high as 390 hp (395 PS; 291 kW).

== US emissions certification ==
In 1977, Californian company Olson Engineering, Inc. was contracted by TVR to design modifications to the Essex V6 such that it could be emissions-certified for use in the United States. This allowed TVR to sell its Essex-engined M Series cars in that market for the 1978 and 1979 model years. An owner's handbook supplement for US Federal models indicates that the emissions control system used a catalytic converter, exhaust gas recirculation, and secondary air injection. A shipment of approximately twenty 3000Ss arrived in September 1979, and were marked by the import company as being emissions compliant without the Olson Engineering emissions kit actually having been fitted. Dealers were made aware of this fact, but were each apparently coerced into buying at least two of the non-compliant cars with the threat of withholding spare parts for other TVR models. One dealer explained the situation to a customer who happened to work for the US government in an emissions-regulation capacity, and he reported the violation to the authorities. The cars were then impounded. During the long period of time during which Martin Lilley attempted to communicate with US customs officials to resolve the situation, the cars were neglected and stored outside, where they deteriorated and were vandalized. The cars were eventually re-exported, repaired, and sold in Germany, but the short-term financial impact of the unsalable cars (worth over £100,000 in total) was damaging to the development of the M Series replacement, the Tasmin.

== South Africa ==
In South Africa, the engine continued in production from 1982 up to April 2000 for use in the Sapphire Saloon and Sierra vehicles, and Courier pick-ups. Late in its production life it was fitted with Lucas controlled electronic fuel injection designed by SAMCOR (South African Motor Corporation – now Ford SA) in co-operation with the University of Pretoria's engineering department. This conversion resulted in a power increase from 103 kW (140 PS; 138 bhp) to 110 kW (150 PS; 148 bhp) of the standard 3.0 version, and 117 kW (159 PS; 157 bhp) for the fuel injection version, plus a useful boost to fuel economy. Only about 1,600 of the EFI variants were produced during 1992 and 1993. In October 1997, the 3.0L was enlarged to 3.4L by boring the cylinders 1 to 94.6 mm (0.039 to 3.724 in) and a new crankshaft with a stroke of 80 mm (3.15 in) giving a displacement of 3.4 L (3,375 cc), this was done for the engine to be better suited to 4x4 vehicles where torque is needed. The 3.4 version produced 108 kW (147 PS; 145 bhp) and 260 N⋅m (192 lb⋅ft). All 3.4 variants used the 38DGAS Weber carburetor with 29 mm (1.1 in) venturis. Production tooling at the factory was scrapped and sold in 2000, to make way for the production of a new four cylinder OHC engine, the remaining old stock of 3.4 L Engines started to be sold as assembled crate engines, these engines had some differences from the 2.5 3.0 and 3.1 L Dagenham built engines such as: Ford Cologne 2.8 / 2.9 V6 forged connecting rods, German made pistons with moly coating, 1/4 in (6.4 mm) smaller crank journals which reduced bearing speed, more aggressive camshaft timing and higher lift, larger 43 mm (1.7 in) inlet valves, shaft mounted rockers from Ford's Cologne 2.8 / 2.9 V6 engine, unique cylinder head castings with extra oil galleries, solid pushrods with no oiling holes, unique exhaust manifold bolt pattern due to the head castings also being unique to the 3.4-litre engine and an improved inlet manifold with larger runners and an improved plenum chamber. From 1966 to 1998, the 3.0L was also used in industrial applications such as generator plants, airport vehicles, milk vans, jet boats (Hamilton jet) and even river barges.

== Vehicles using the Essex V6 ==
The Essex V6 was fitted to a wide variety of cars, both from Ford and from smaller specialist manufacturers that used Ford engines. Among these were the following:

=== United Kingdom ===
- AC ME3000 3.0 L
- Ford Capri 3.0 L and 3.1 L
- Ford Granada 2.5 L and 3.0 L
- Ford Consul (Granada Mk1 Based) 2.5 L and 3.0 L
- Ford Transit 3.0 L (only police and ambulance services)
- Ford A series
- Ford Zephyr 2.5 L and 3.0 L
- Ford Zodiac 2.5 L and 3.0 L
- Gilbern Genie 2.5 L and 3.0 L
- Gilbern Invader 3.0 L
- Marcos (various models) 3.0 L
- Reliant Scimitar 2.5 L and 3.0 L
- TVR 3000M – 3.0 L
- TVR 3000S – 3.0 L
- TVR Taimar 3.0 L
- TVR Tuscan V6 3.0 L

Custom installations

- Ford Escort Apache 3.0 L
- Ford Corsair Crayford 3.0 L
- Ford Cortina Savage 3.0 L
- Ford Cortina Cheetah 2.5 L
- Ford Escort Superspeed Mk1 3.0 L
- Ford Capri Broadspeed 3.0 L
- Ford Capri Broadspeed 3.0 L turbo
- Ford Capri Comanche 3.0 L
- Ford Transit Easipower 3.0 L
- Ford Granada Seneca 3.0 L
- Ford Capri 3.0 L Perana V6

=== South Africa ===
- Ford Zephyr and Zodiac (Mk4)
- Ford Cortina Perana (Mk2)
- Ford Capri 3.0 L Perana V6
- Ford 17M and 20M (Taunus)
- Ford Transit van V4 + V6
- Ford Capri (Mk1)1970 to 1973.
- Ford Cortina (Mk3, Mk4, Mk5)
- Ford Granada (Mk1, Mk2)
- Ford Sierra hatch/Station Wagon 1984 to 1993.
- Ford Sierra/Sapphire 1989 to 1993.
- Ford Sapphire Ghia (EFI-engined Sapphire) 1992 to 1993
- Ford Sierra/Sapphire 3.0i RS (EFI-engined Sierra produced alongside the Sapphire Ghia)
- Ford 1 ton pickup (Cortina Mk3+ Mk4 + Mk5 based) 1974 to 1985.
- Ford Courier/Mazda Drifter 1 ton pickup 1986 to 2000
- Also fitted by a number of companies as aftermarket conversions in VW Kombi and Toyota Hiace
- Ferrino Sports car, based on Ferrari Dino, using a tubular chassis and glassfibre body.
- Lynx Roadster, based on Ford Cortina chassis with glassfibre body.

== See also ==
- List of Ford engines
