= Dead pedal =

Auto part

In an automobile, the dead pedal, often also called a footrest, is typically a non-moving piece of rubber or metal that the driver is supposed to rest their foot on when driving. Although the dead pedal serves no mechanical function in the car, many car manufacturers opt to implement it because it provides a number of ergonomic benefits to the driver. In manual transmission cars, the dead pedal is designed to promote a smoother actuation of the clutch by keeping the driver's foot in the same plane as the pedal. Automatic transmission cars can also benefit from the dead pedal because it prevents fatigue by offering a stable inclined surface on which the driver can place their foot. An after market accessory can also be used.

== History ==
The dead pedal was not a staple component in the original design of automobile pedals. Cars such as the original Ford Model T, 1908, did not have dead pedals and had an upright pedal system. The dead pedal was developed to prevent the accidental actuation of the clutch or brake, by providing an alternative surface to rest the foot on. The dead pedal became more important with time as stronger and faster cars were developed because the left foot must push against the floor to brace the driver's body. Racing cars and civilian cars with manual transmission systems will have the dead pedal. Cars equipped with an automatic transmission may also have a dead pedal.

== Function ==
The dead pedal serves two main purposes in cars.

- It acts as a footrest for the left foot, for the comfort of the driver.
- In cars with manual transmissions, it helps keep the driver from riding the clutch, a dangerous practice of keeping the clutch partially disengaged while driving.

The dead pedal provides an inclined surface for the driver's left foot. This allows the driver to brace when maneuvering without accidentally engaging the brakes. This helps the driver maintain more control over the vehicle. It also prevents wear on the brake or clutch pedal because even if no additional pressure is put on these pedals, the constant contact and abrasion of the driver's foot will wear away at the surface of pedals. In automatic cars, the dead pedal is normally just a rubber step placed on the floor of the car. In racing cars, the dead pedal is used to cut down the response time in activating the clutch and is integral to the smooth actuation of the clutch. It is typically an actual pedal located to the left of the clutch. The dead pedal allows for the racer or driver to keep the left foot on the same plane as the clutch, thus making the transition between them smoother and faster. However, the dead pedal still serves no function to the car itself. There have been attempts to advance the dead pedal technology by making it modular and by making it serve a function as an engine regulator.

== Type ==
=== Footrests ===
The most common and widely available, these dead pedals come in the form of footrests that are put on the car floor. They come in many forms: some are metal plates, some are rubber pads, and some are simply a raised area of the car floor.

=== Dummy pedals ===
These are fake pedals that don't actually serve a function but are still a native part of the car's pedal system. These can be found in some race cars.

== Implementation ==
Dead pedals have never been a required addition to standard automobile pedal sets. This is because the advantages of having a dead pedal are most commonly associated with manual transmission cars. Furthermore, cars with left side drive often have a natural footrest because of the wheel well so it is more common to find the right-side drive cars with dead pedals. However, the dead pedal promotes safe driving habits by serving as a place for drivers to place their foot and prevent accidental left foot braking. It is not recommended to brake with the left foot because it is less confusing when switching between automatic and manual transmission cars. Resting one's foot on the brake pedal may also accidentally light up the brake lights when the vehicle is not decelerating.

The use of the dead pedal is particularly prevalent in right-hand drive markets where the wheel well bulkhead cannot be used to rest the left foot, for example in the Renault Mégane.

This area may also include other features not associated with direct operation of the vehicle, for instance, a foot button for control of the lights or radio. On certain models of Mercedes-Benz and Volvo vehicles and many American trucks, the parking brake is a pedal located here.
