= Performance driving =

Performance driving, also known as car control, is the use of specific techniques by the driver of an automobile in order to maximize the performance potential (See also vehicle dynamics) of the automobile during acceleration, turning, and braking maneuvers, typically while driving at a facility dedicated—and specifically constructed—to host automobile motorsport competitive events.

The raison d'être for this technique is the performance characteristics of the modern automotive tire. Car tires have a specific maximum amount of grip (one component of 'grip' being friction). The tire is also load sensitive; i.e., the maximum grip developed at any instant in time is dependent upon the force applied at the tire to tarmac interface. The driver has great influence upon the load on a given tire and also the rate at which that load is applied to the tire.

== Techniques ==
Various methods are utilized for performance driving; these include the following:

- Separation of Controls
  - Brake
  - Throttle
  - Steering
- Vision/ Use of Eyes
- Visualization
- Anticipation
- Muscle Memory
- Practice techniques

== Skill acquisition ==
The skills can be learned in a variety of ways, such as through books describing the techniques, videos demonstrating them, by attending a school organized specifically to teach the techniques, or by means of high-fidelity racing simulators.
