= Ford Capri =

1968–1986 car by Ford Motor Company

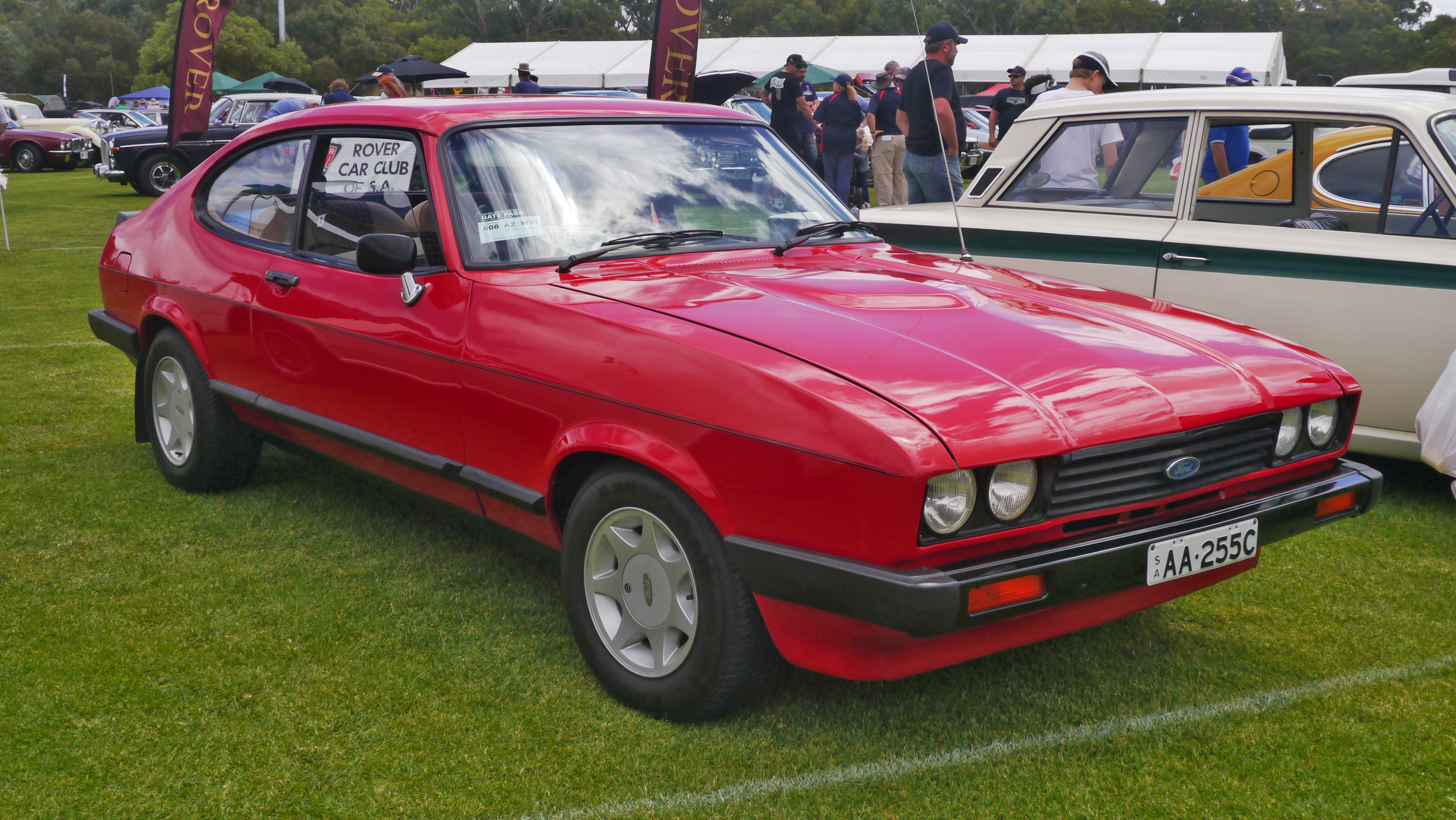
- 1978 Ford Capri Mk3 2.0L

Overview
- Manufacturer: Ford Europe
- Production: November 1968 – December 1986
- Designer: Philip T. Clark

Body and chassis
- Class: Mid-size coupé
- Related: Ford Cortina; Ford Taunus TC

Chronology
- Successor: Ford Probe; Ford Puma

The Ford Capri is a car which was built by Ford of Europe from 1968 to 1986. It is a fastback coupé and was designed by Philip T. Clark, who had been involved in the design of the Ford Mustang. It used the mechanical components from the Mk2 Ford Cortina and was intended as the European equivalent of the Ford Mustang. The Capri went on to be highly successful for Ford, selling nearly 1.9 million units in its lifetime. A wide variety of engines were used in the car throughout its production lifespan, which included V6 engines named Essex and Cologne at the top of the range, while the straight-four (Kent) and V4 (Taunus) engines were used in lower-specification models. Although the Capri was not officially replaced, the second-generation Probe was effectively its replacement after the later car's introduction to the European market in 1994.

== History ==
=== Ford Capri Mk I (1969–1974) ===
Ford Capri Mk I
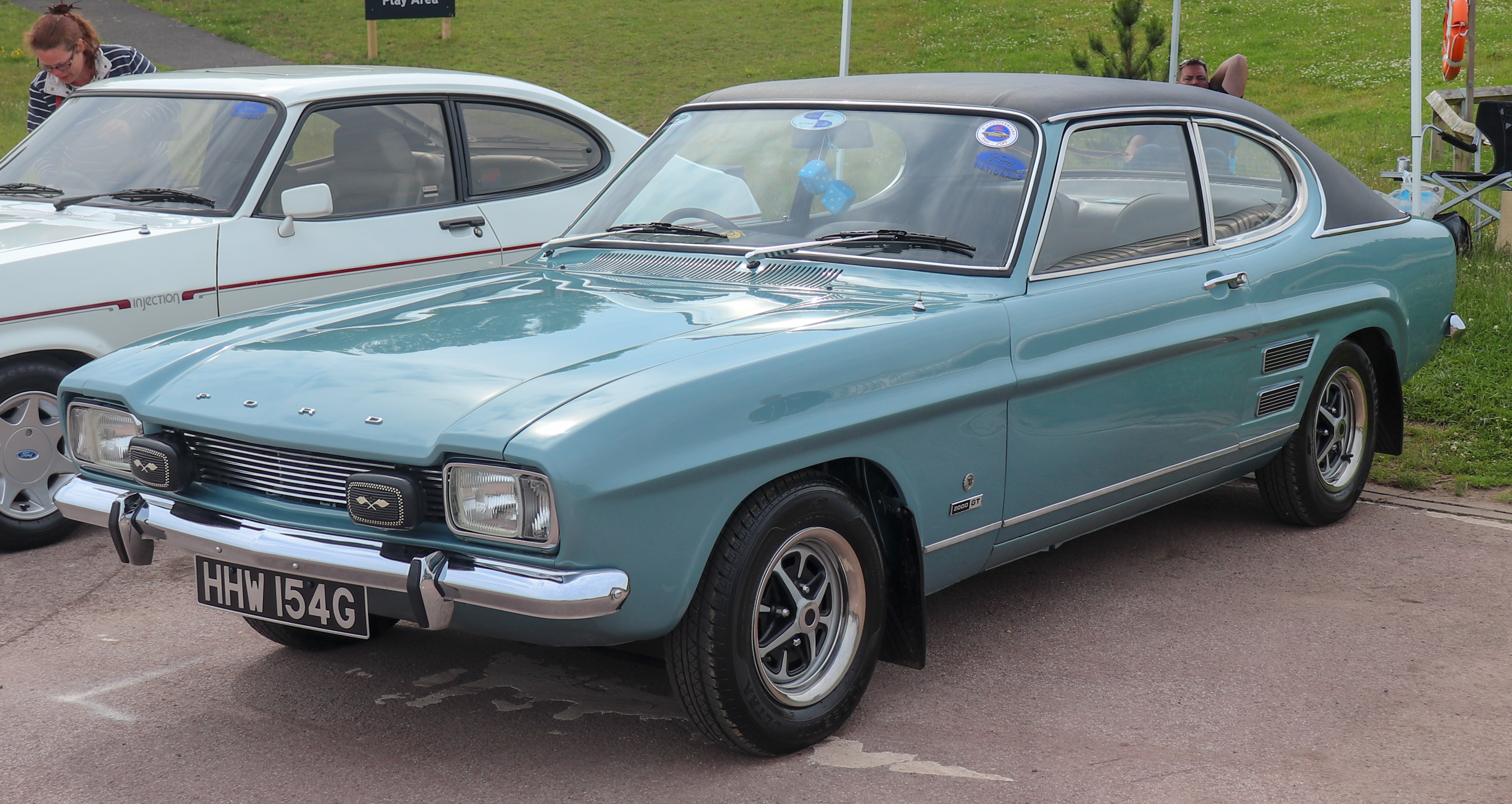
- 1969 Ford Capri 2.0 "Mark 1" with Rostyle wheels

Overview
- Manufacturer: Ford of Europe
- Also called: Capri (North America)
- Production: November 1968 – December 1973
- Assembly: United Kingdom: Halewood (Halewood Body & Assembly); West Germany: Saarlouis (Saarlouis Body & Assembly); Cologne (Cologne Body & Assembly, Mercury Capri); Australia: Homebush; South Africa: Port Elizabeth; Singapore: Bukit Timah Road; Thailand: AutoAlliance Thailand

Body and chassis
- Class: Mid-size coupé
- Body style: Fastback coupé
- Layout: FR layout
- Related: Ford Cortina Mk II

Powertrain
- Engine: 1.3 L Kent I4; 1.3 L Taunus V4; 1.5 L Taunus V4; 1.6 L Kent I4; 1.7 L Taunus V4; 2.0 L Cologne V6; 2.0 L Essex V4; 2.0 L Pinto I4; 2.3 L Cologne V6; 2.6 L Cologne V6; 3.0 L Essex V6; 3.1 L Essex V6 (RS3100); 5.0 L Windsor V8 (Perana)
- Transmission: 4-speed manual all-synchromesh

Dimensions
- Wheelbase: 100.8 in (2,560 mm)
- Length: 168.5 in (4,280 mm)
- Width: 64.8 in (1,646 mm)
- Height: 50.7 in (1,288 mm)
- Curb weight: 2,053 lb (931 kg); 2,522 lb (1,144 kg) 3000GXL

Chronology
- Successor: Ford Capri Mk II

Production of the Capri began in November 1968. It was unveiled in January 1969 at the Brussels Motor Show, with sales starting the following month. The intention was to reproduce in Europe the success Ford had had with the North American Ford Mustang by producing a European pony car.

It was mechanically based on the Cortina, built at the Halewood plant for the United Kingdom and at Genk (Belgium), Saarlouis and Cologne (Germany) for Europe. The car was named Colt during its development stage, but Ford was unable to use the name, which had already been trademarked by Mitsubishi (and used since 1962 on its Colt).

The name Capri comes from the Italian island and this was the second time Ford had used the name, the previous model being the Ford Consul Capri, often just known as the Capri in the same way the Ford Consul Cortina and Ford Consul Classic rarely used the "Consul" in everyday use (the Ford Consul Cortina was officially renamed Ford Cortina in 1964).

Ford wanted the flashy fastback coupé to be affordable for a broad spectrum of potential buyers, which it made possible in part by making it available in a variety of engines. The British and German factories produced different Capri Mk I line-ups, with the continental model using the Ford Taunus V4 engine in 1.3, 1.5 and 1.7 L engine displacements, and British the Ford Kent straight-four in 1.3 and 1.6 L form. The Ford Essex V4 engine 2.0 L (British built) and Cologne V6 2.0 L (German built) served as initial range-toppers. At the end of the year, new sports versions were added: the 2300 GT in Germany, using a double-barrel carburettor with 125 PS (92 kW), and in September 1969 the 3000 GT in the UK, with the Essex V6, capable of 138 hp (103 kW).

Under the new body, the running gear was very similar to the 1966 Cortina. The rear suspension employed a live axle supported on leaf springs with short radius rods. MacPherson struts were featured at the front in combination with rack and pinion steering (sourced from the Ford Escort) which employed a steering column that would collapse in response to a collision.

The initial reception of the car was broadly favourable. The range continued to be broadened, with another 3.0 variant, the Capri 3000E introduced from the British plant in March 1970, offering "more luxurious interior trim".

Ford began selling the Capri in the Australian market in May 1969 and in April 1970 it was released in the North American and South African markets. The South African Models initially used the Kent 1.6 engine and the V4 2.0 version of the Essex, although a Pinto straight-four 2.0 L replaced it in some markets in 1971. An exception, though, was the Perana manufactured by Basil Green Motors near Johannesburg, which was powered first by a 3.0 Essex engine and then by a 302ci V8 Ford Windsor engine after Ford South Africa began offering 3.0 Essex-engined options. All North American versions featured the "power dome" hood and four round 5 3/4" U.S.-spec headlights. They carried no "Ford" badging, as the Capri was only sold by Lincoln-Mercury dealers (with the Mercury division handling sales) and promoted to U.S. drivers as "the sexy European".

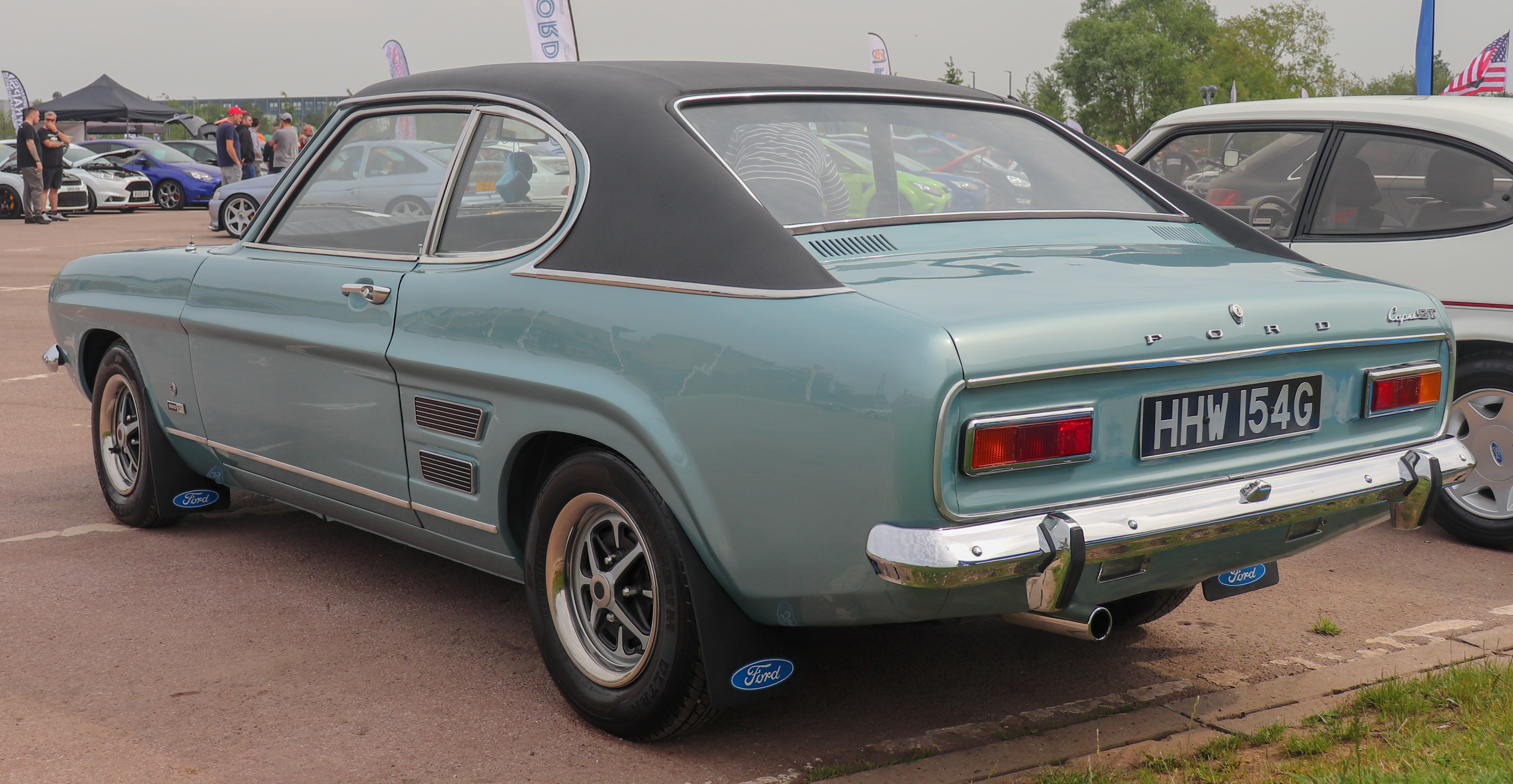
Rear (pre-facelift)

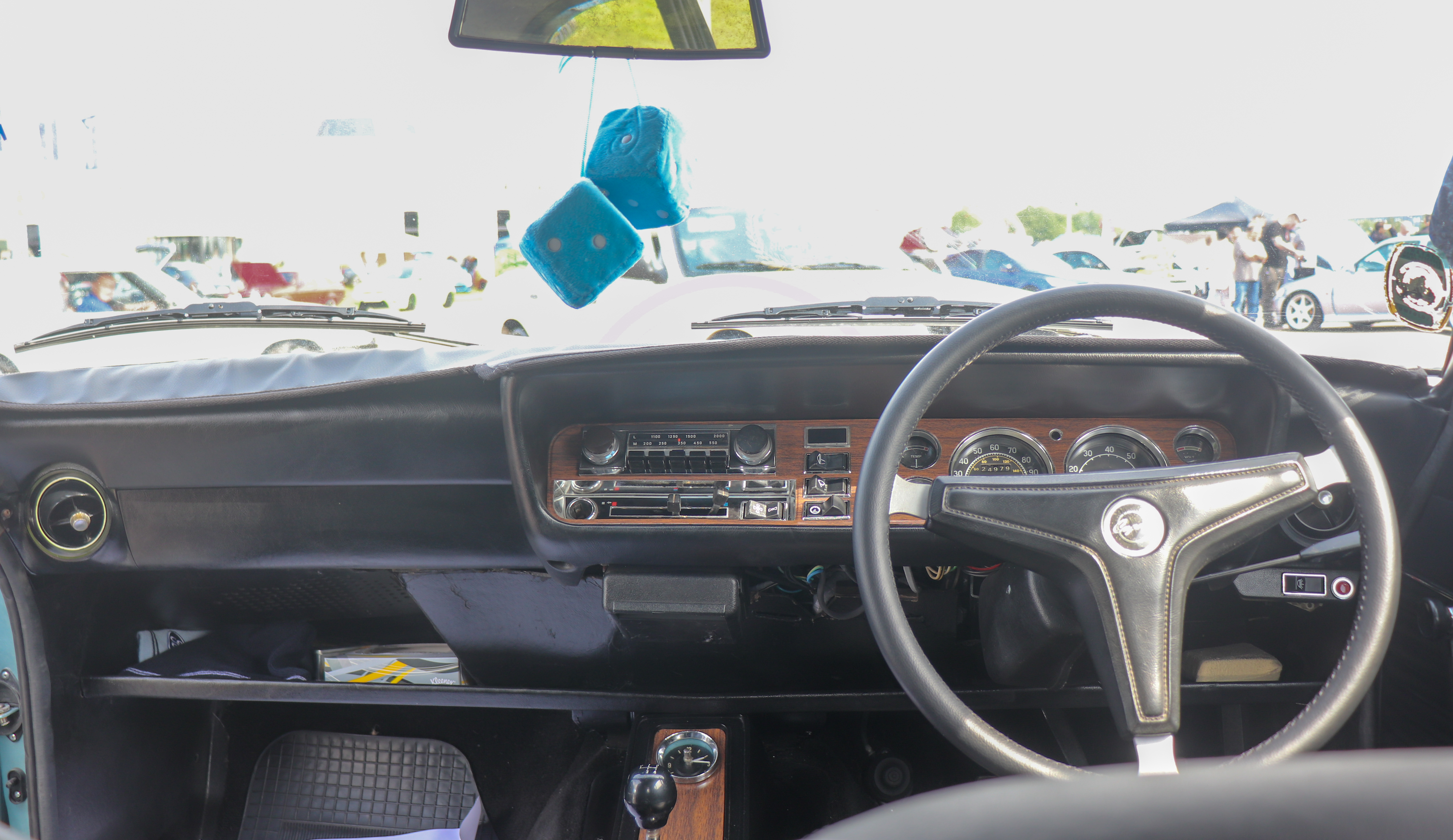
"Mark I" Interior

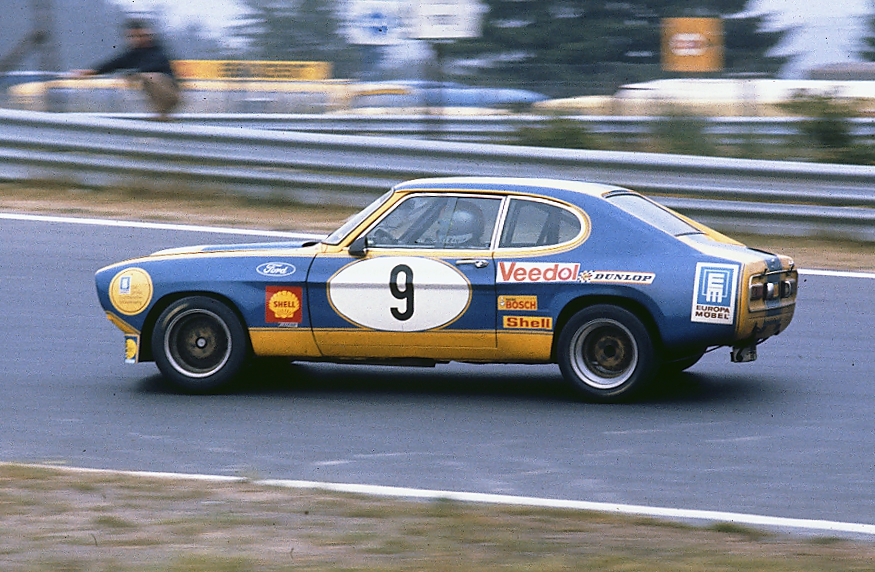
Hans Heyer 1973 with Ford Capri at the Nürburgring

The Capri was sold in Japan with both the 1.6 L and 2.0 L engines in GT trim. Sales were handled in Japan by Kintetsu Motors, then an exclusive importer of Ford products to Japan. The 2.0-litre engine attracted a higher annual road tax, but both models qualified as compact cars under the Japanese vehicle class system.

A new 2637 cc version of the Cologne V6 engine assembled by Weslake and featuring their special all alloy cylinder heads appeared in September 1971, powering the Capri RS2600. This model used Kugelfischer fuel injection to raise power to 150 PS (110 kW) and was the basis for the Group 2 RS2600 used in the European Touring Car Championship. The RS2600 also received modified suspension, a close ratio gearbox, lightened bodywork panels, ventilated disc brakes and aluminium wheels. It could hit 100 km/h from a standstill in 7.7 seconds. The 2.6 L engine was detuned in September for the deluxe version 2600 GT, with 2550 cc and a double-barrel Solex carburettor. Germany's Dieter Glemser won the drivers' title in the 1971 European Touring Car Championship at the wheel of a Ford Köln entered RS2600 and fellow German Jochen Mass did likewise in 1972.

The first Ford Special was the Capri Vista Orange Special. The Capri Special was launched in November 1971 and was based on the 1600 GT, and 2000 GT models. It was only available in vista orange and was optional dealer fitted with a Ford Rally Sport boot mounted spoiler and rear window slats – a direct link to the Mustang. The Special also had some additional standard extras such as a push-button radio, fabric seat upholstery, inertia reel seat belts, heated rear screen and black vinyl roof. There were only 1200 Vista Orange Capri Specials made.

One of the last limited editions of the original Mk I was the GTXLR Special, a version that came in either metallic green or black with red interior and featured some additional extras, such as cloth inserts in the seats, hazard lights, map reading light, opening rear windows, vinyl roof and for the first time a bonnet bulge was fitted to the sub-3.0-litre models. This special edition was only available with the 1.6 or 2.0 engines.

==== Mk I facelift ====
The Capri proved highly successful, with 400,000 cars sold in its first two years. Ford revised it in late 1971. It received new and more comfortable suspension, enlarged tail-lights (replacing the one sourced from the Escort Mk1) and new seats. Larger headlamps with separate indicators were also fitted, with quad headlamps now featured on the 3000GXL model. The Kent engines were replaced by the Ford Pinto engine and the previously UK-only 3000 GT joined the German line-up. In the UK the 2.0 L V4 remained in use.

In addition, North American versions received larger rubber-covered bumpers (to comply with US DOT regulations) for 1973.

In 1973, the Capri saw the highest sales total it would ever attain, at 233,000 vehicles: the 1,000,000th Capri, an RS 2600, was completed on 29 August.

On 25 September 1973, Ford gave the green light to the long-awaited RHD RS Capri, replacing the Cologne V6 based RS 2600 with the Essex V6 based RS 3100, with the usual 3.0 L Essex V6's displacement increased to 3,098 cc (3.1 L; 189.1 cu in) by boring the cylinders from the 93.6 mm (3.69 in) of the 3.0 L to 95.25 mm (3.75 in). Unlike its predecessor, it used the same double-barrel 38-DGAS Weber carburetor as the standard 3.0 L, and reached the same 150 PS (148 bhp; 110 kW) at 5000 rpm as the RS 2600 and 254 N⋅m (187 lb⋅ft) at 3000 rpm of torque. The RS 3100's ride height was one inch lower than other Capris, and also featured other unique modifications such as gold pinstriping, a ducktail rear spoiler, a re-drilled crossmember to move the suspension arms outward to provide negative camber which also made it necessary to have special wider flared front wings, heavy duty springs with Bilstein gas dampers at the front and rear, competition single rear leaf springs, special bump rubbers and spacer blocks, a small front air dam and larger 9.75 inch front ventilated disc brakes. These modifications made the RS 3100 very stable at high speeds but several reviews also complained about its rough ride. Only 250 RS3100s were built for homologation purposes between November 1973 and December 1973 so its racing version could be eligible for competition in the over three-litre Group 2 class for the 1974 season However, the car was still competitive in touring car racing, and Ford Motorsport produced a 100-model limited edition with this new engine. The Group 2 RS3100's engine was tuned by Cosworth into the GAA, with 3,412 cc (3.4 L; 208.2 cu in), fuel injection, DOHC, 4 valves per cylinder and 435 hp (324 kW) in racing trim. The car also featured improved aerodynamics. Besides the racing RS3100, the GAA engine was also used in the Formula 5000 racing category.

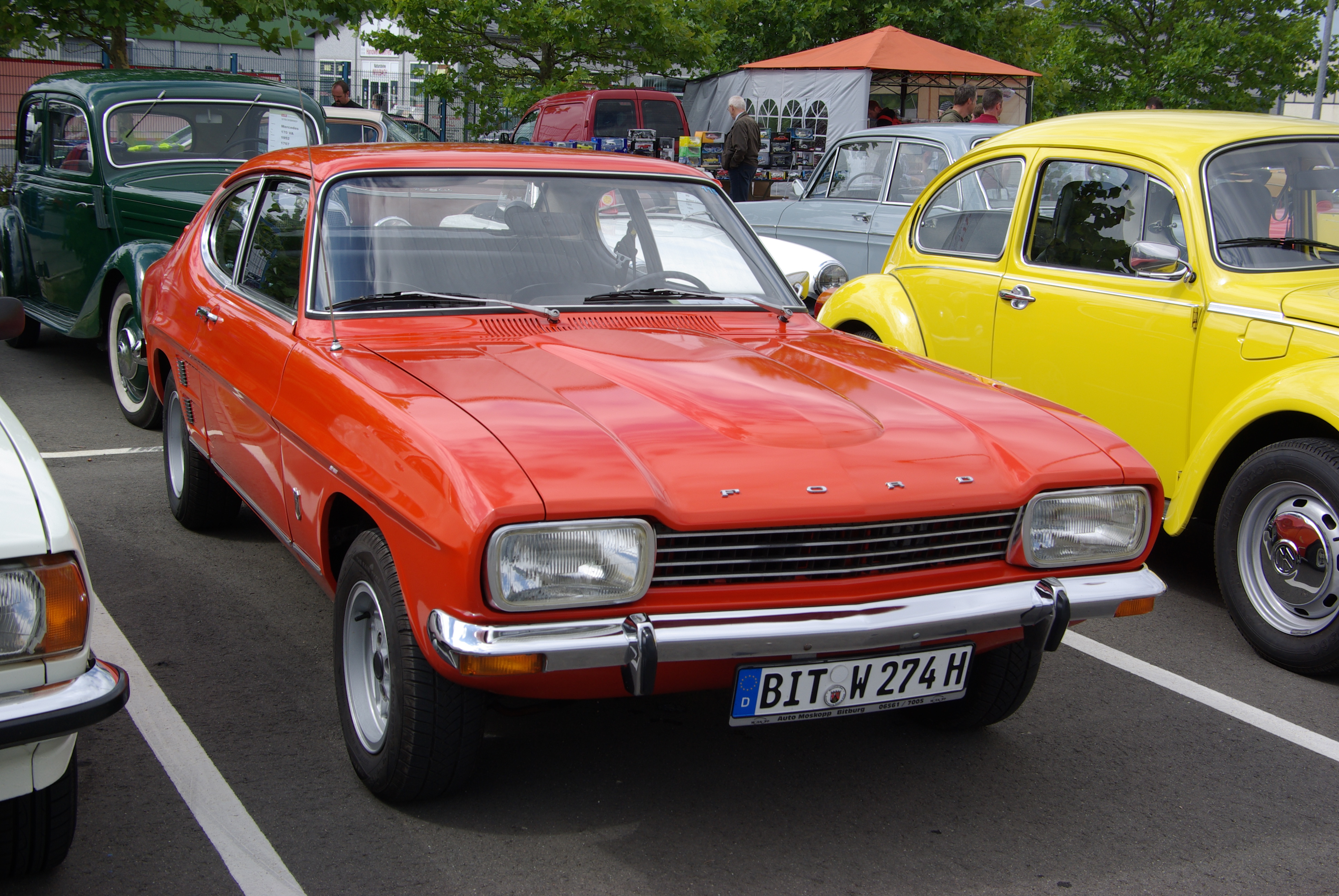
1973 Ford Capri

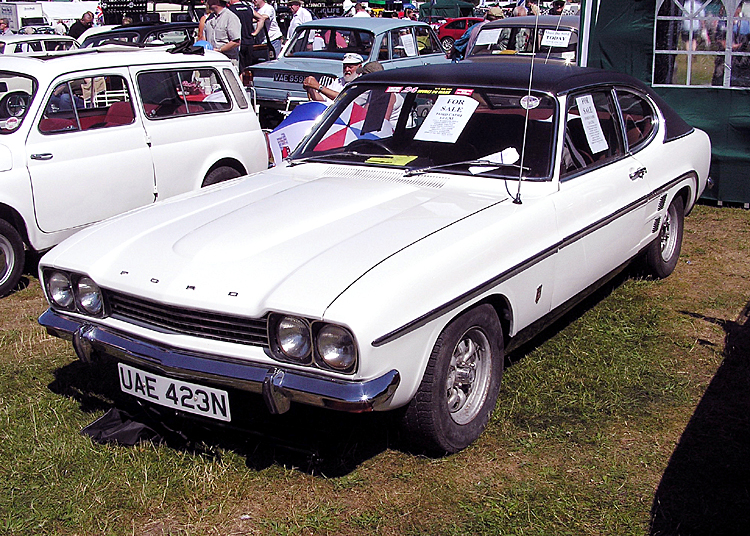
1974 Ford Capri 3000 GXL

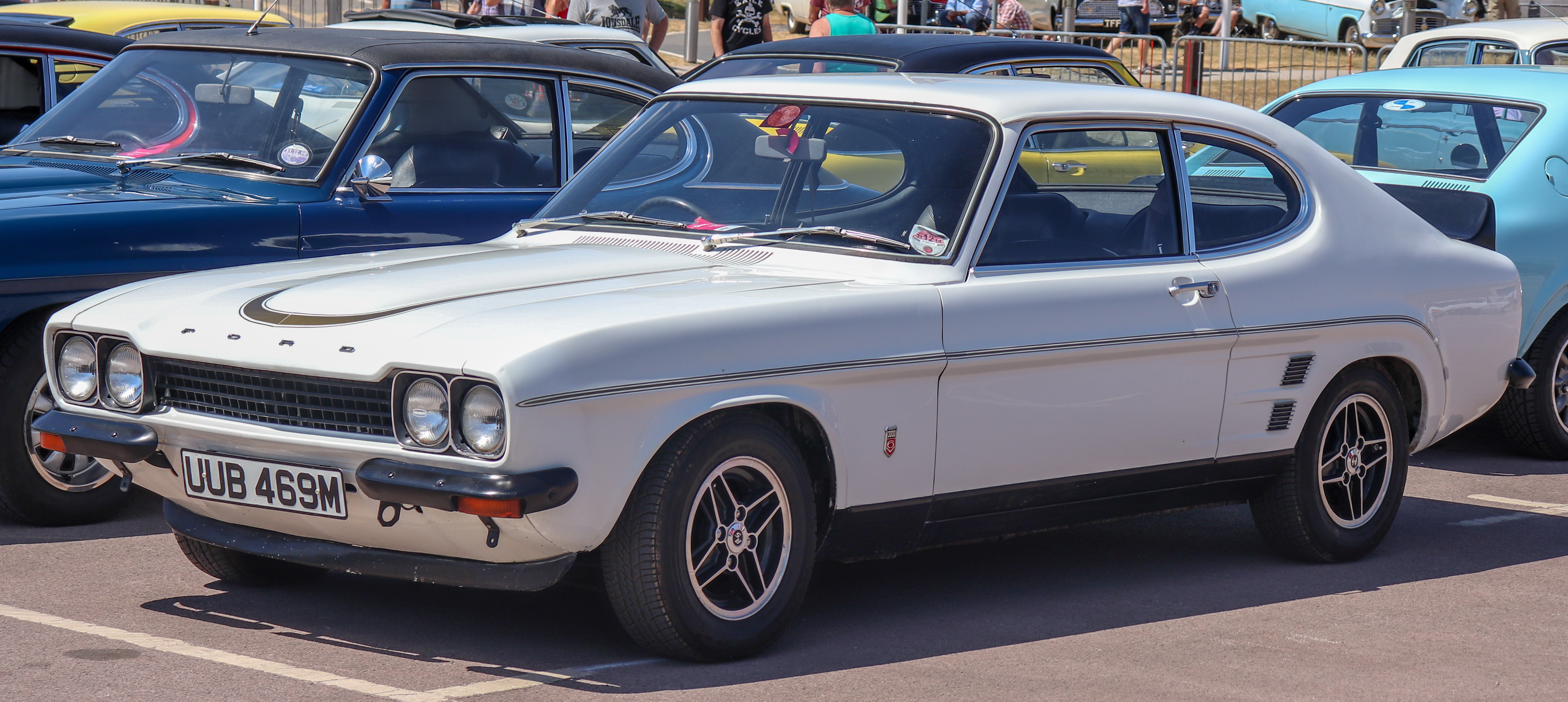
1974 Ford Capri RS 3100

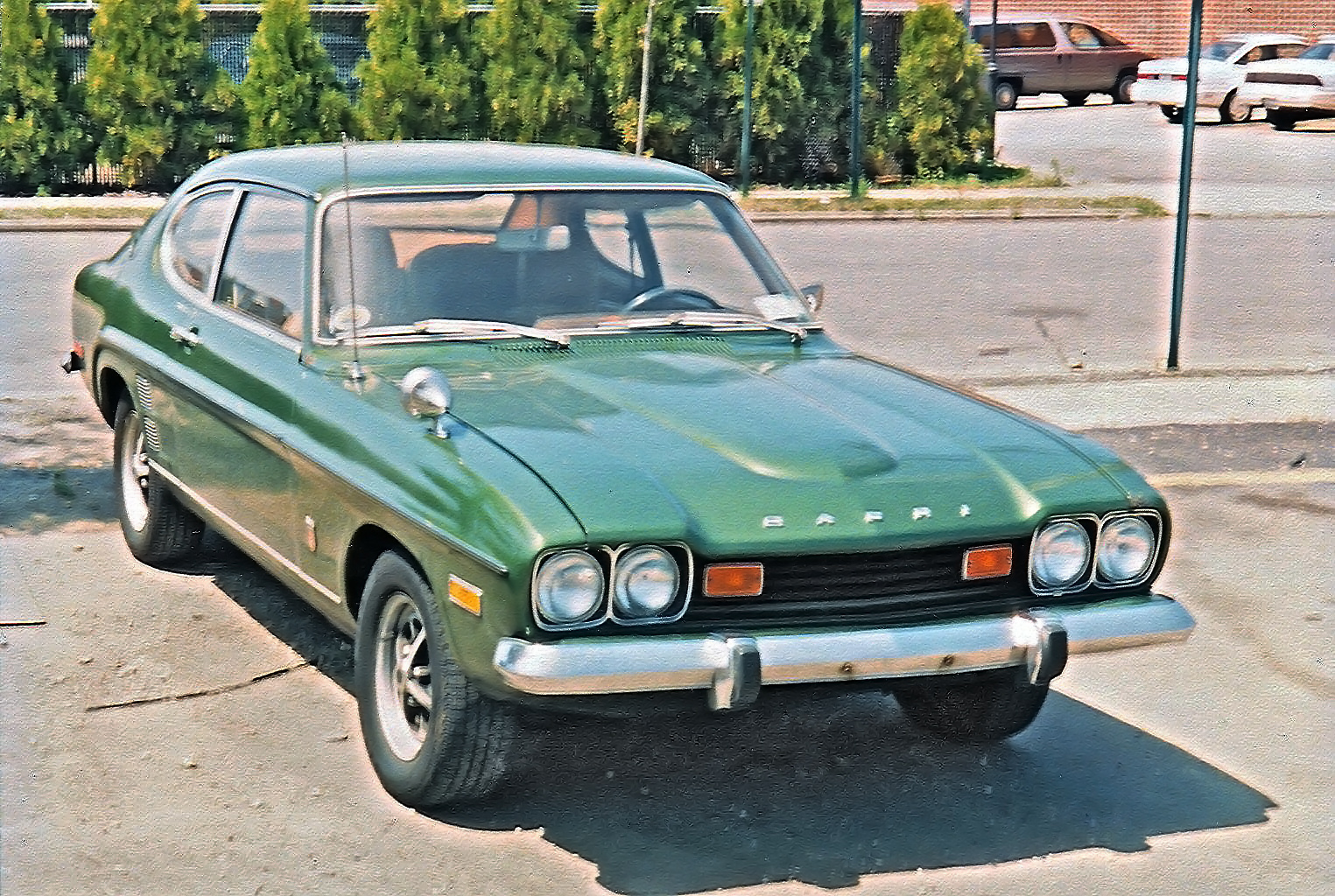
1973 Mercury Capri 2600 (USA spec)

=== Ford Capri Mk II – 'Capri II' (1974–1978) ===
Ford Capri Mk II
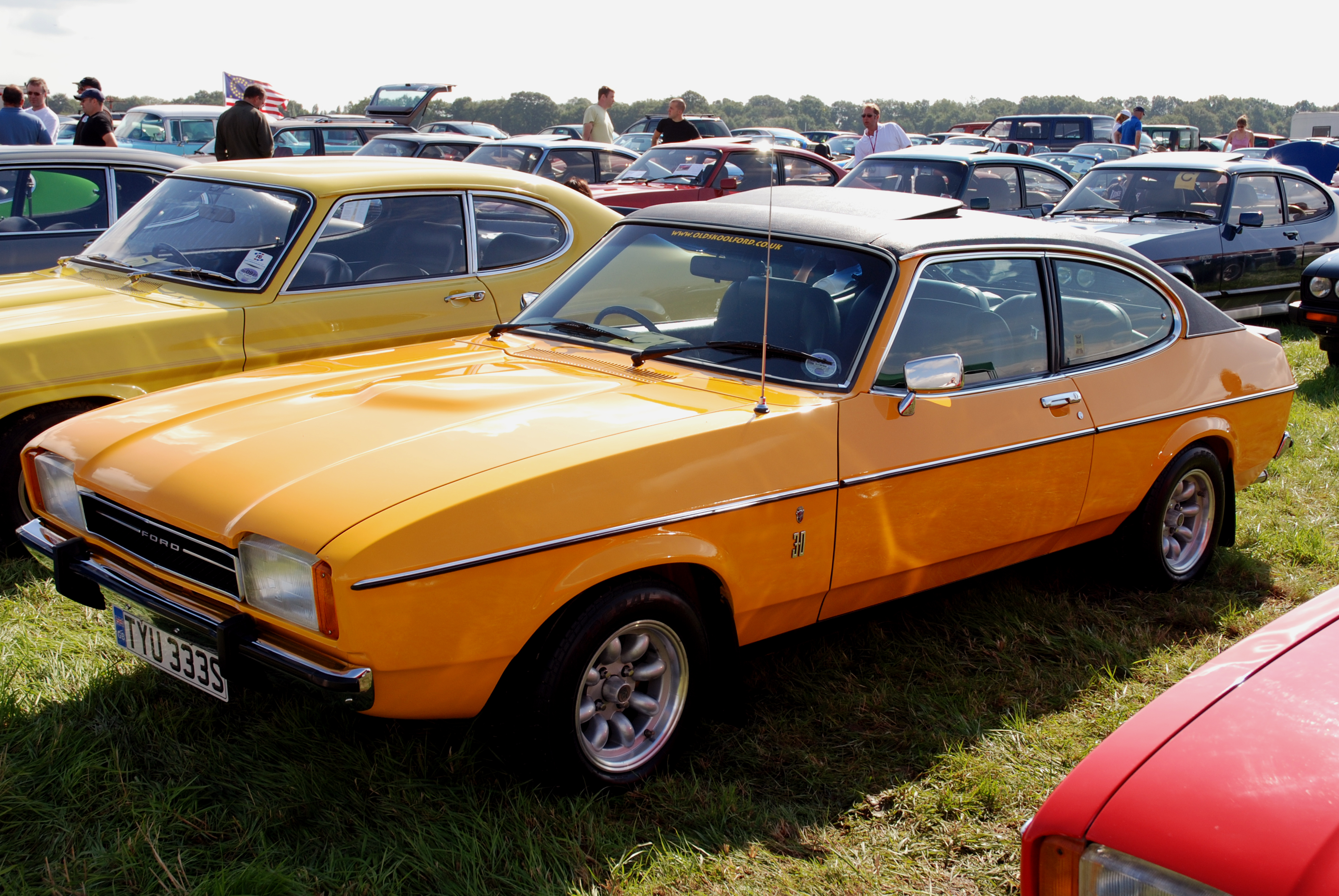
- 1977 Capri II 3000 Ghia

Overview
- Manufacturer: Ford of Europe
- Also called: Capri (North America)
- Production: 1974–1978
- Assembly: United Kingdom: Halewood (Halewood Body & Assembly); West Germany: Cologne (Cologne Body & Assembly)

Body and chassis
- Class: Mid-size sports car
- Body style: Hatchback coupé
- Layout: FR layout

Powertrain
- Engine: 1.3 L Crossflow I4; 1.6 L Crossflow I4; 1.6 L Pinto TL16 I4; 2.0 L Cologne V6; 2.0 L Pinto TL20 I4; 2.3 L Cologne V6; 3.0 L Essex V6
- Transmission: 4-speed manual 3-speed automatic

Dimensions
- Wheelbase: 100.7 in (2,559 mm)
- Length: 166.9–169.8 in (4,240–4,313 mm)
- Width: 66.9 in (1,698 mm)
- Height: 53.4 in (1,357 mm)
- Curb weight: 2,149.5–2,513.3 lb (975–1,140 kg)

Chronology
- Predecessor: Ford Capri Mk I
- Successor: Ford Capri Mk III

On 25 February 1974, the Capri II was introduced. After 1.2 million cars sold, and with the 1973 oil crisis, Ford chose to make the new car more suited to everyday driving with a shorter bonnet, larger cabin and the adoption of a hatchback rear door (accessing a 630-litre boot). This made it the first Ford to feature a hatchback, at a time when the hatchback was becoming increasingly popular in Europe after first being patented by Renault in the mid-1960s. By the standards of the mid-1970s, the Capri II was a very well evolved vehicle with very few reliability issues. For Germany the Capri now offered 1.3-litre (55 PS (40 kW)), 1.6-litre (72 PS (53 kW)), 1.6-litre GT (88 PS (65 kW)), or 2.0-litre (99 PS (73 kW)) straight-four engines, complemented by a 2.3-litre V6 (108 PS (79 kW)) and the UK sourced 3.0-litre V6 with (140 PS (103 kW)), available with either a four-speed Ford Type 5 manual transmission or one of Ford's new C3 three-speed automatic transmissions available on all models except the 1.3, the C3 automatic transmission proved to be a very popular option among Ghia buyers, therefore it became standard on all Ghia models after the 1976 model year and the four-speed manual transmission became optional.

Although it was mechanically similar to the Mark I, the Capri II had a revised, larger body and a more modern dashboard and a smaller steering wheel. The 2.0 L version of the Pinto engine was introduced in the European model and was placed below the 2.3-litre V6 and the 3.0-litre V6. The Capri still maintained the large rectangular headlights, which became the easiest way to distinguish between a Mark II and a Mark III. Larger front disc brakes, a standard alternator and a front air-dam on all S models finished the list of modifications.

Ford introduced the John Player Special limited edition, (known as the JPS) in March 1975. Available only in black or white, the JPS featured yards of gold pinstriping to mimic the Formula 1 livery, gold-coloured wheels, and a bespoke upgraded interior of beige cloth and carpet trimmed with black. In May 1976, and with sales decreasing, the intermediate 3.0 GT models disappeared to give way for the upscale 3.0 S and Ghia designations. In October 1976, the only UK plant producing Capris, Ford's Halewood plant stopped production, and all production of the Capri was moved to the Cologne Body & Assembly factory in Germany.

The last year that Capris were made for the US market was 1977, with 513,500 cars sold in the year.

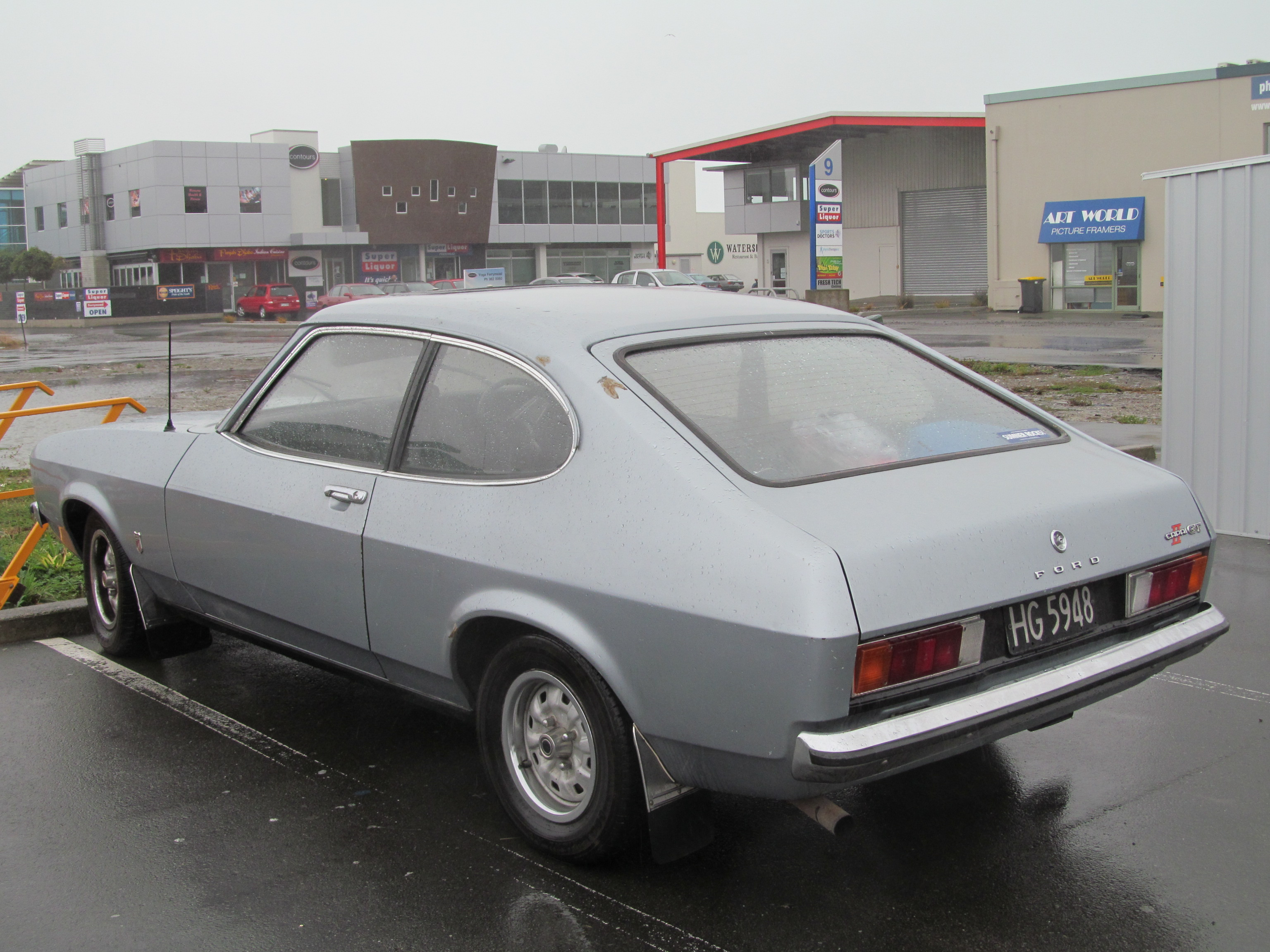
Rear

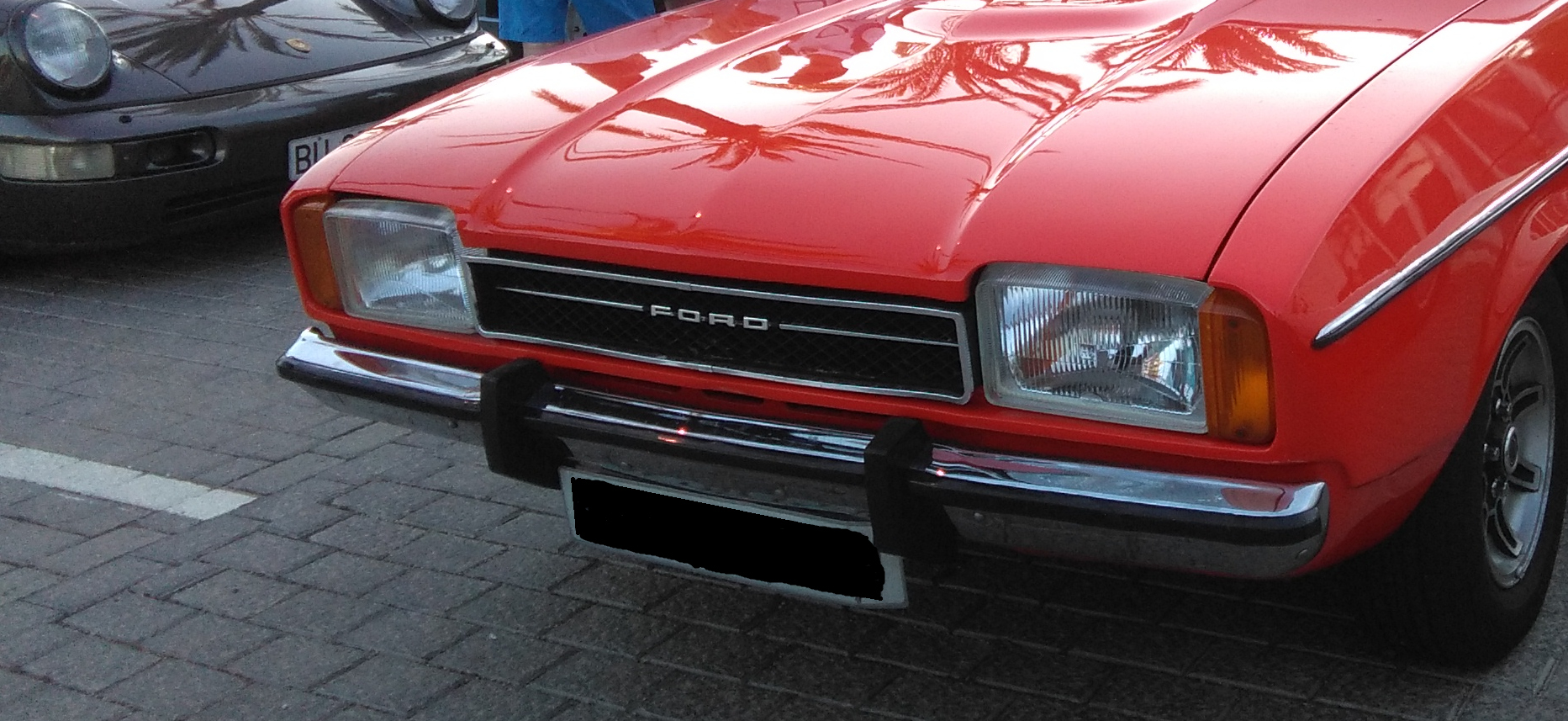
The MkII is easily identified by the two large rectangular Hella H4 headlamps.

==== Engines ====
Model	Displacement	Type code	Power	Top speed	0–60 mph (0–97 km/h) (s)	Years
1300 HC	1,298 cc (79.2 cu in)	Crossflow I4	56 hp (42 kW; 57 PS)	89 mph (143 km/h)	19.9	1976–1978
1300 LC	1,298 cc (79.2 cu in)	Crossflow I4	54 hp (40 kW; 55 PS)	87 mph (140 km/h)	21.7	1974–1976
1300 LC	1,298 cc (79.2 cu in)	Crossflow I4	54 hp (40 kW; 55 PS)	87 mph (140 km/h)	21.6	1976–1978
1300 LC (UK)	1,298 cc (79.2 cu in)	Crossflow I4	50 hp (37 kW; 51 PS)	85 mph (137 km/h)	23.2	1976–1978
1300 L HC	1,298 cc (79.2 cu in)	Crossflow I4	56 hp (42 kW; 57 PS)	89 mph (143 km/h)	19.9	1974–1976
1300 XL HC	1,298 cc (79.2 cu in)	Crossflow I4	71 hp (53 kW; 72 PS)	96 mph (154 km/h)	16.4	1974–1976
1600 Ghia/GT	1,593 cc (97.2 cu in)	Pinto TL16G I4	87 hp (65 kW; 88 PS)	104 mph (167 km/h)	12.8	1974–1976
1600 HC	1,593 cc (97.2 cu in)	Pinto TL16H I4	71 hp (53 kW; 72 PS)	97 mph (156 km/h)	15.5	1974–1976
1600 HC	1,593 cc (97.2 cu in)	Pinto TL16H I4	71 hp (53 kW; 72 PS)	97 mph (156 km/h)	15.4	1976–1978
1600 LC	1,593 cc (97.2 cu in)	Pinto TL16L I4	68 hp (51 kW; 69 PS)	95 mph (153 km/h)	16.3	1974–1976
1600 LC	1,593 cc (97.2 cu in)	Pinto TL16L I4	67 hp (50 kW; 68 PS)	95 mph (153 km/h)	16.3	1976–1978
1600 L (Sweden)	1,593 cc (97.2 cu in)	Crossflow I4	62 hp (46 kW; 63 PS)	91 mph (146 km/h)	16.6	1976–1978
2000	1,993 cc (121.6 cu in)	Pinto TL20H I4	97 hp (72 kW; 98 PS)	108 mph (174 km/h)	11.7	1974–1976
2000	1,993 cc (121.6 cu in)	Pinto TL20H I4	97 hp (72 kW; 98 PS)	108 mph (174 km/h)	11.2	1976–1978
2000 V6	1,999 cc (122.0 cu in)	Cologne V6	89 hp (66 kW; 90 PS)	104 mph (167 km/h)	12.7	1976–1978
2300	2,294 cc (140.0 cu in)	Cologne V6	107 hp (80 kW; 108 PS)	111 mph (179 km/h)	10.6	1974–1976
2300	2,294 cc (140.0 cu in)	Cologne V6	107 hp (80 kW; 108 PS)	111 mph (179 km/h)	10.6	1976–1978
3000	2,994 cc (182.7 cu in)	Essex V6	138 hp (103 kW; 140 PS)	122 mph (196 km/h)	8.4	1974–1978

=== Ford Capri Mk III (1978–1986) ===
Ford Capri Mk III
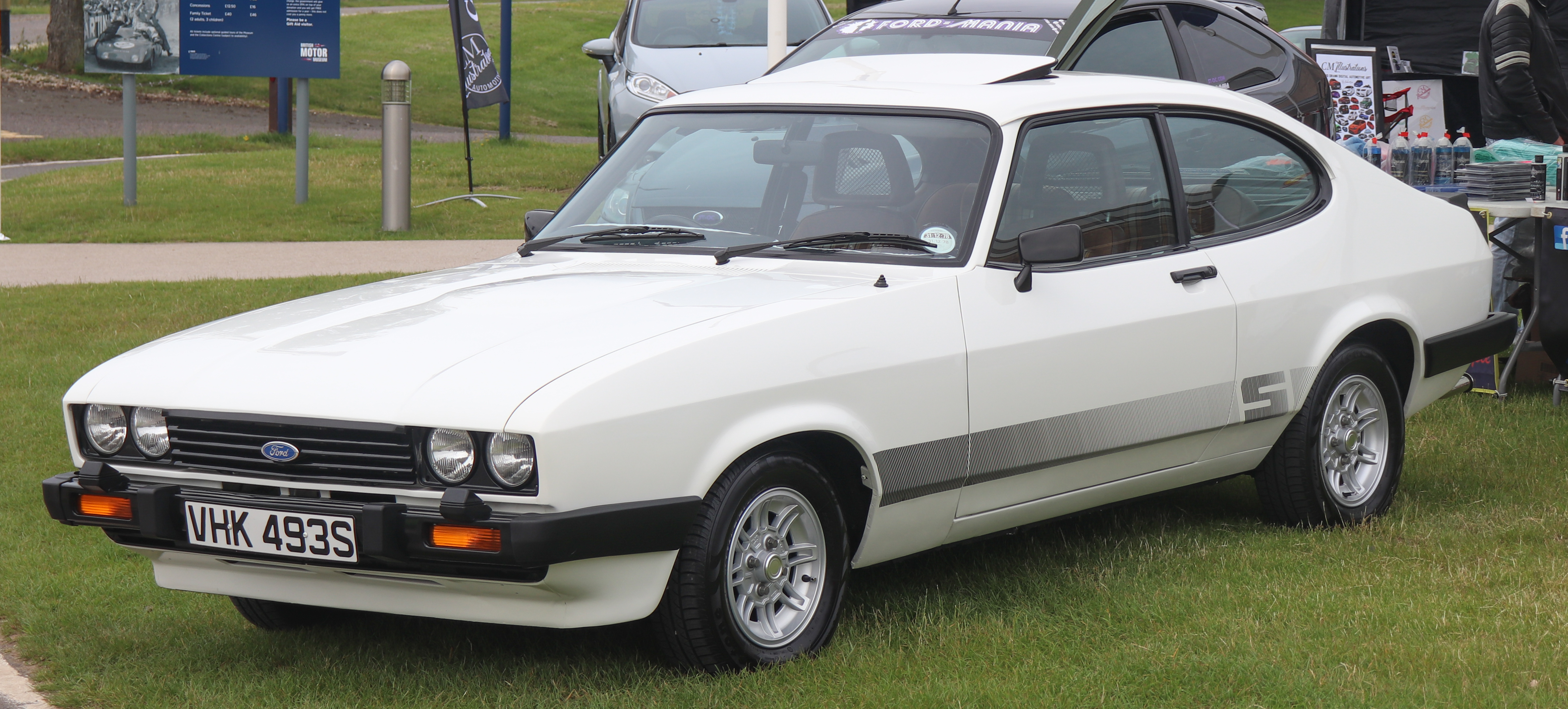
- 1978 Ford Capri S 3.0

Overview
- Manufacturer: Ford of Europe
- Production: March 1978 – December 1986
- Assembly: Germany: Cologne (Cologne Body & Assembly)

Body and chassis
- Class: Mid-size sports car
- Body style: Hatchback coupé
- Layout: FR layout

Powertrain
- Engine: 1.3 L Crossflow I4; 1.6 L Pinto TL16 I4; 2.0 L Cologne V6; 2.0 L Pinto TL20 I4; 2.3 L Cologne V6; 2.8 L Cologne V6; 3.0 L Essex V6
- Transmission: 4-speed manual 5-speed manual 3-speed automatic

Dimensions
- Wheelbase: 101 in (2,565 mm)
- Length: 167.8 in (4,262 mm)
- Width: 67 in (1,702 mm)
- Height: 51 in (1,295 mm)
- Curb weight: 2,227 lb (1,010 kg) 1.3L; 2,293 lb (1,040 kg) 1.6S; 2,273 lb (1,031 kg) 2.0S; 2,620 lb (1,188 kg) 2.8i; 2,688 lb (1,219 kg) 3.0S

Chronology
- Predecessor: Ford Capri Mk II

The Capri Mk III was referred to internally as "Project Carla", and although little more than an update of the Capri II, it was often referred to as the Mk III. The first cars were available in March 1978, and sold very well initially. The concept of a heavily facelifted Capri II was shown at the 1976 Geneva show: a Capri II with a front very similar to the Escort RS2000 (with four headlamps and black slatted grille), and with a rear spoiler, essentially previewed the model some time before launch. The new styling cues, most notably the black "Aeroflow" grille (first used on the Mk I Fiesta) and the "sawtooth" rear lamp lenses echoed the new design language being introduced at that time by Ford of Europe's chief stylist Uwe Bahnsen across the entire range. Similar styling elements were subsequently introduced in the 1979 Cortina 80, 1980 Escort Mk III and the 1981 Granada Mk IIb. In addition, the Mk III featured improved aerodynamics, leading to improved performance and economy over the Mk II. The trademark quad headlamps were introduced, while the bonnet's leading edge was pulled down over the top of the headlamps, making the appearance more aggressive.

At launch the existing engine and transmission combinations of the Capri II were carried over, with the 3.0 S model regarded as the most desirable model although in Britain the softer, more luxurious Ghia derivative with automatic, rather than manual transmission, was the bigger seller of the two V6-engined models. In Germany, the "S" models were by far the most popular equipment level (across all engines), representing 63 percent of Capri sales there.

Ford began to focus their attention on the UK Capri market as sales declined elsewhere, realising the car had something of a cult following there. Unlike sales of the contemporary four-door Cortina, Capri sales in Britain were mostly to private buyers who would demand fewer discounts than fleet buyers, allowing for higher margins on the coupé. Ford tried to maintain interest in 1977 with Ford Rallye Sport, Series X, "X Pack" options from the performance oriented RS parts range. Although expensive and slow selling these proved that the press would enthusiastically cover more developed Capris with higher performance.

However, the rise in popularity of "hot hatchbacks" and sports saloons during the early 1980s saw demand for affordable sports car fall throughout Europe. Between 1980 and 1983, Ford launched the Fiesta XR2, Escort XR3/XR3i and Sierra XR4i. All of these sold well, while their introduction onto the market saw a decline in Capri sales even in the UK. Several of its competitors had already been discontinued without a direct replacement, most notably British Leyland's MG B which was not directly replaced when the Abingdon factory which produced it was closed in 1980. Vauxhall had launched coupe versions of its MK1 Cavalier in 1978 but when the MK2 Cavalier was launched in 1981 there were no new coupe versions. Renault did not replace its Fuego coupe which was discontinued in 1986.

In addition to being the most popular sporting model in Britain for most of its production life, the third generation Capri was also one of the most stolen cars in Britain during the 1980s and early 1990s, being classified as "high risk" of theft in a Home Office report.

The 3.0 S was used extensively in the TV series The Professionals in the early 1980s, with characters Bodie driving a silver 3.0 S and Doyle a gold 3.0 S.

On 30 November 1984, production of Capris for the European market ceased, from then on it would only be produced in right-hand drive form for the British market. Ford had decided not to launch a direct successor to the Capri, as it did not feel that demand for affordable coupes in Europe was sufficient for a new Capri to be developed. Ford was, however, enjoying success with high performance versions of the Fiesta, Escort and Sierra, which appealed mostly to buyers who might have been expected to buy a Capri before 1980.

==== 2.8 Injection models ====
For the 1982 model year, the Essex 3.0 V6 powerplant which had been the range topper since September 1969 was dropped, mainly because of ever more strict emissions regulations, that Ford knew the old Essex V6 design could not meet. A new sport-oriented version of the Capri debuted at the Geneva Motor Show, called the 2.8 Injection. The new model was the first regular model since the RS2600 to use fuel injection. Power rose to a claimed 160 PS (118 kW), even though tests showed the real figure was closer to 150 PS (110 kW), giving a top speed of 210 km/h (130 mph), but the car still had a standard four-speed gearbox. The Capri 2.8 Injection breathed new life into the range and kept the car in production 2–3 years longer than Ford had planned. The four-speed gearbox was replaced with a five-speed unit early on – at the same time Ford swapped the dated looking chequered seats for more luxurious looking velour trim. A more substantial upgrade was introduced in 1984 with the Capri Injection Special. This development used half leather seating and included a limited-slip differential. Externally the car could be easily distinguished by seven-spoke RS wheels (without the customary "RS" logo since this was not an RS vehicle) and colour-coded grille and headlamp surrounds. At the same time the 2.0 Capri was rationalised to one model, the 2.0 S, which simultaneously adopted a mildly modified suspension from the Capri Injection. The 1.6 model was also reduced to a single model, the 1.6 LS.

By the 1986 model year - the Capri's final year on sale - the range had been rationalised even further to just the 1.6 Laser, 2.0 Laser and the 2.8 Injection.

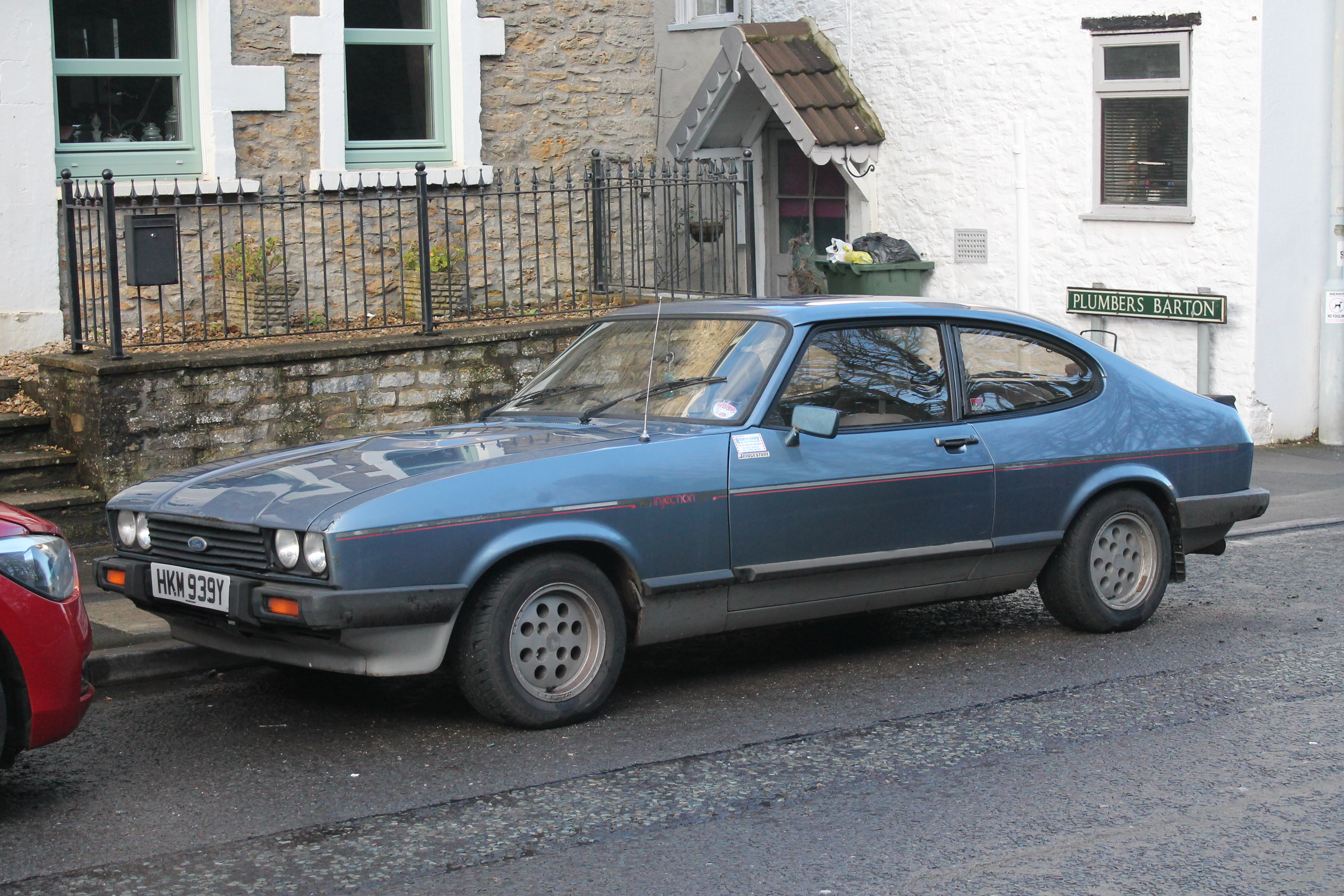

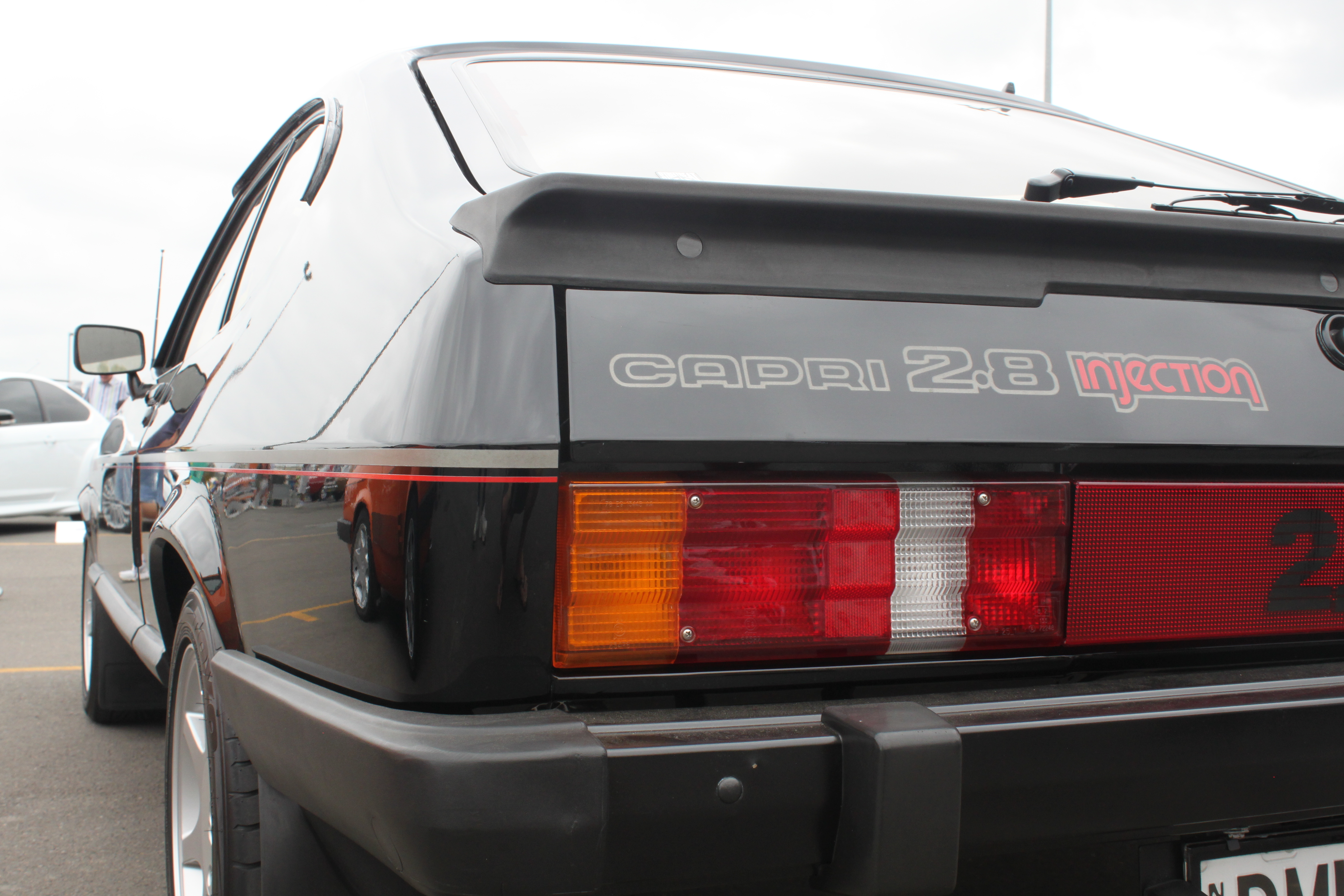

==== Series X & GP1 ====
The Mark II and Mark III 3.0-litre X-pack special performance options pack for the Capri were offered between 1977 and 1980. They used a special glassfibre wide bodykit made by Fibresports, larger ventilated front disc brakes (retaining the standard drums at the rear), Bilstein gas-filled rear dampers and front struts (used with single rear leaf springs), an "anti-dive kit", a Salisbury limited-slip differential (LSD) and a choice of two performance upgrades for Essex V6 3.0 L engines. The first upgrade, called the GP1 or Group 1 pack, bumped power up to 170 hp (127 kW). This engine included larger valves, ported cylinder heads and a Weber 40 DFI5 carburetor and other optional performance upgrades. The second option, referred to as Series X or X Pack, offered 185 hp (138 kW) and 195 lb/ft of torque, thanks to three Weber 42 DCNF two-barrel carburetors fed by an electric fuel pump, the same ported cylinder heads and larger inlet and exhaust valves as the GP1. It used special head gaskets even though the standard compression ratio of 9.0:1 and standard camshaft were retained. The X Pack was also equipped with a wing as standard and it featured unique 7.5 x 13-inch wheels, for which a special bodykit was made. The X Pack included a free flowing performance exhaust system with distinctive flattened rear ends. The X Pack Capri could reach 60 mph from standing in 7.4 seconds, a full second faster than the standard 3.0-litre Capri, and had a top speed of 130 mph. These upgrades could only be bought through and fitted by one of the 80 Ford RS Motorsport dealerships in the UK, or a complete new car could be ordered factory equipped through a Ford Motorsport dealer. It is estimated that little over 100 conversions were made.

The X Pack was also available in mainland Europe between 1979 and 1980 where it was marketed as the 3.0 RS even though it's wasn't ever an official RS like the 2600 or 3100. All were white with blue stripes and used standard 3.0 Engines, Only 100 of these were ever made, and 1980 was the last year for both the German RS and British X Pack. The next year the 3.0 engine option disappeared completely to give way for the new 2.8 Injection models.

==== 2.8 Turbo ====
From July 1981 to September 1982, German RS dealers marketed a limited edition, Zakspeed inspired, left-hand drive only, 'Werksturbo' model capable of 220 km/h (137 mph). Based on the 3.0 S, this derivative featured widened Series X bodywork, front and rear 'Ford Motorsport' badged spoilers, deep 7.5j four-spoked RS alloy wheels fitted with Pirelli P7 235/60VR13 tyres and an RS badged engine. The engine was based on a normally aspirated carburetor equipped 2.8-litre Cologne V6, Ford Granada (Europe) engine using electronic ignition, a Tufftrided crankshaft, heavy duty head gaskets and oil pump, an oil cooler and a single Garrett T4 turbocharger providing 5.4 psi of boost, a limited-slip differential, Bilstein dampers all around, an anti dive kit, uprated RS anti roll bars and single rear leaf springs, the engine put out 188 Hp at 5500 rpm. Figures of around 200 produced examples are common, but numbered transmission tunnels possibly indicate 155 conversions were made.

==== Tickford Turbo ====
The Tickford Capri used a turbocharged 2.8 Injection Cologne engine which developed 205 hp (153 kW), allowing it to reach 60 miles per hour in 6.7 seconds and 100 miles per hour in 18.5 seconds, topping out at 137 miles per hour. This version also featured a luxury interior with optional full leather retrim and Wilton carpeting and headlining, large rear spoiler, colour-coded front grille, deeper bumpers and 'one off' bodykit designed by Simon Saunders, later of KAT Designs and now designer of the Ariel Atom.

Rear disc brakes were standard on the Tickford, which featured numerous other suspension modifications. This model was essentially rebuilt by hand by Tickford at approximately 200 hours per car. It sold only 80 units. One problem was the relative price difference to the standard Capri Injection, with the Tickford version costing twice as much.

What is thought to be the last Capri registered in the UK is a white Tickford registered on 11 September 1991 with the registration number J4AJA.

==== Turbo Technics conversions ====
Independent tuner Turbo Technics also released a turbocharged 200 hp (149 kW) and 230 hp (172 kW) evolution which came supplied with a specially built gearbox. The Tickford Capri pricing issues meant that Ford also sanctioned the Turbo Technics conversion as semi-official, although only the German RS and British Tickford ever appeared in Ford literature as official Ford products.

==== Capri Laser ====
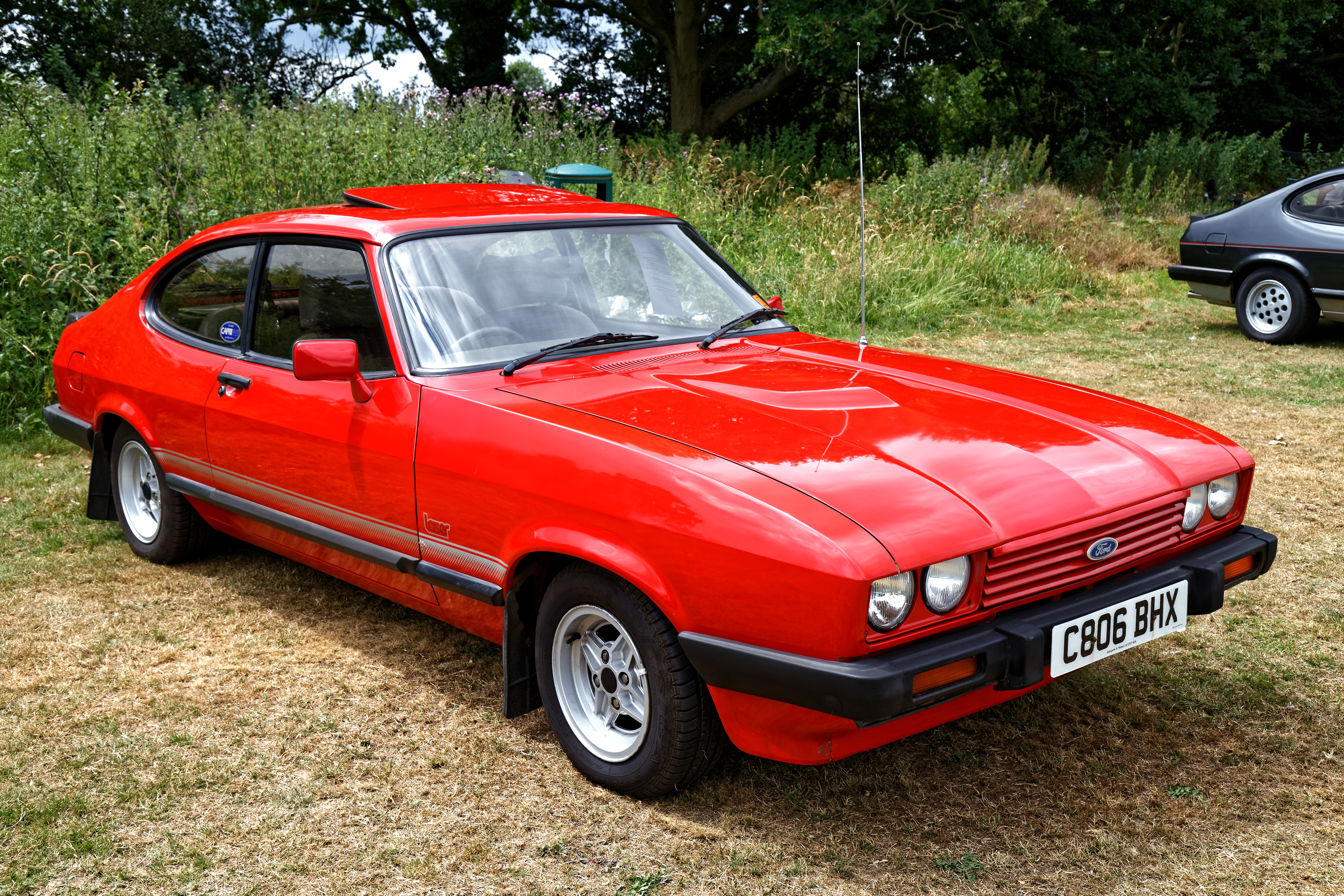
1985 Ford Capri Laser 2.0

From November 1984 onwards, the Capri was sold only in Britain, with only right hand drive cars being made from this date. The normally aspirated 1.6 and 2.0 variants were rebranded with a new trim level – "Lasers" – which featured a fully populated instrument pod, leather gear lever, leather steering wheel, four-spoke alloy wheels as used on the S models, an electric aerial and colour-coded grille and mirrors.

The very last Laser Capri came off the line in November 1986, painted in a unique "Mercury Grey" colour. This car was registered on 8 May 1987 in Sussex and is to be found in a collection of classic cars in Gillingham, Kent.

==== Capri 280 ====
The last run limited edition Capri 280, nicknamed "Brooklands" referring to the name of the particular shade of green that all Capri 280 models were painted in, featured a limited-slip differential, full leather Recaro interior and Pirelli Cinturato P7 tyres, 15 inch versions of the seven spoke 13 inch wheels fitted to the superseded Capri Injection Special. Ford originally intended to make 500 turbocharged vehicles (by Turbo Technics) complete with gold alloy wheels and name it the Capri 500 but a change of production planning meant a name change to Capri 280 as the cars were simply the last models that ran down the production line. A total of 1,038 Capri 280s were built. There was no direct successor to the Capri, as Ford felt that there was not adequate demand for a car of this type in Europe to justify a direct replacement; Capri sales had been declining since 1980, with faster versions of more practical hatchbacks and saloons becoming popular at the expense of sports cars. British Leyland, for instance, had taken the decision not to replace its MG and Triumph sports cars on their demise at the beginning of the 1980s due to falling popularity, instead concentrating on mostly MG-badged versions of hatchbacks and saloons like the Metro and Montego, while Ford had enjoyed strong sales of its faster versions of the Fiesta, Escort and Sierra in the run-up to the Capri's demise.

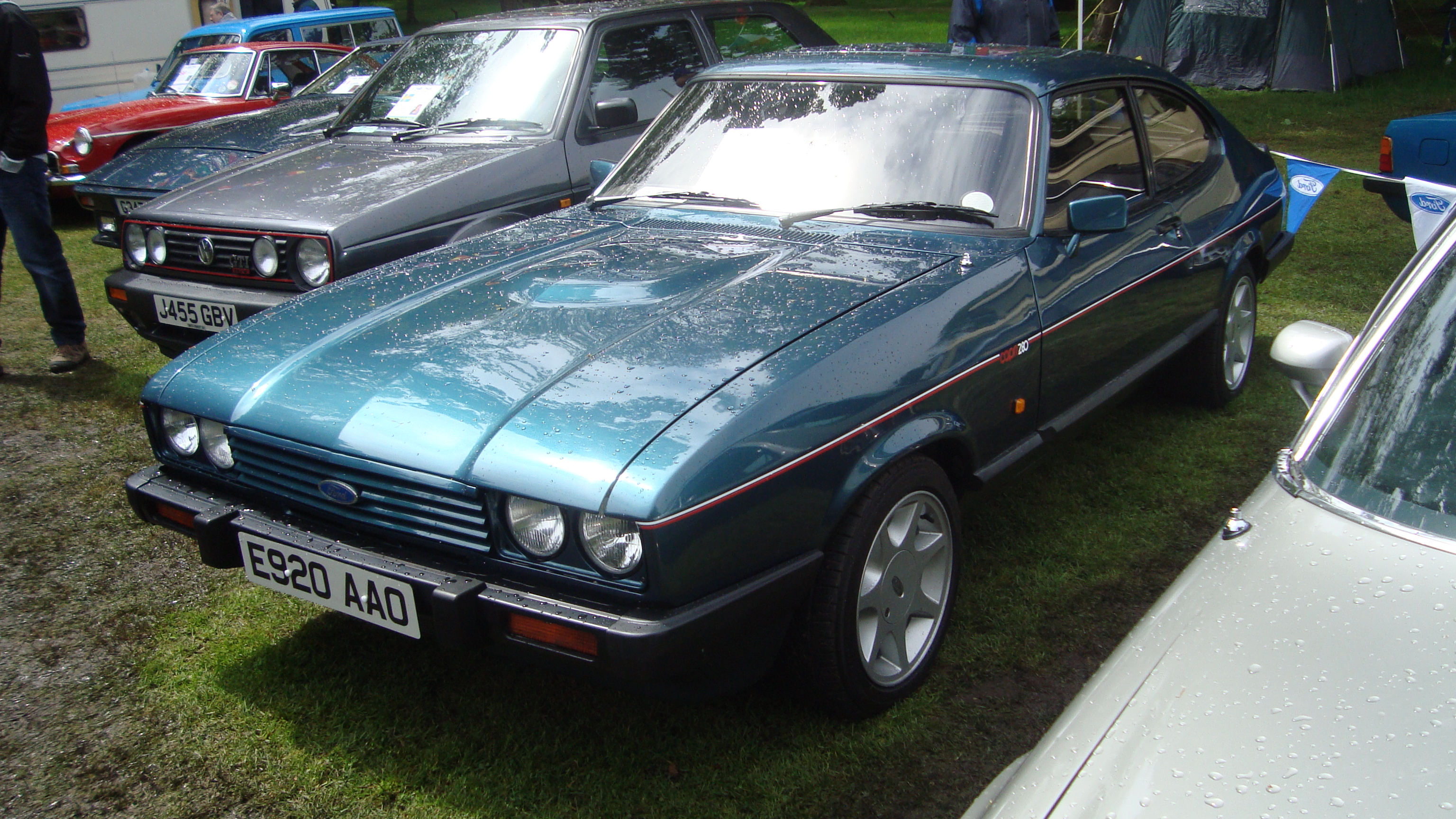

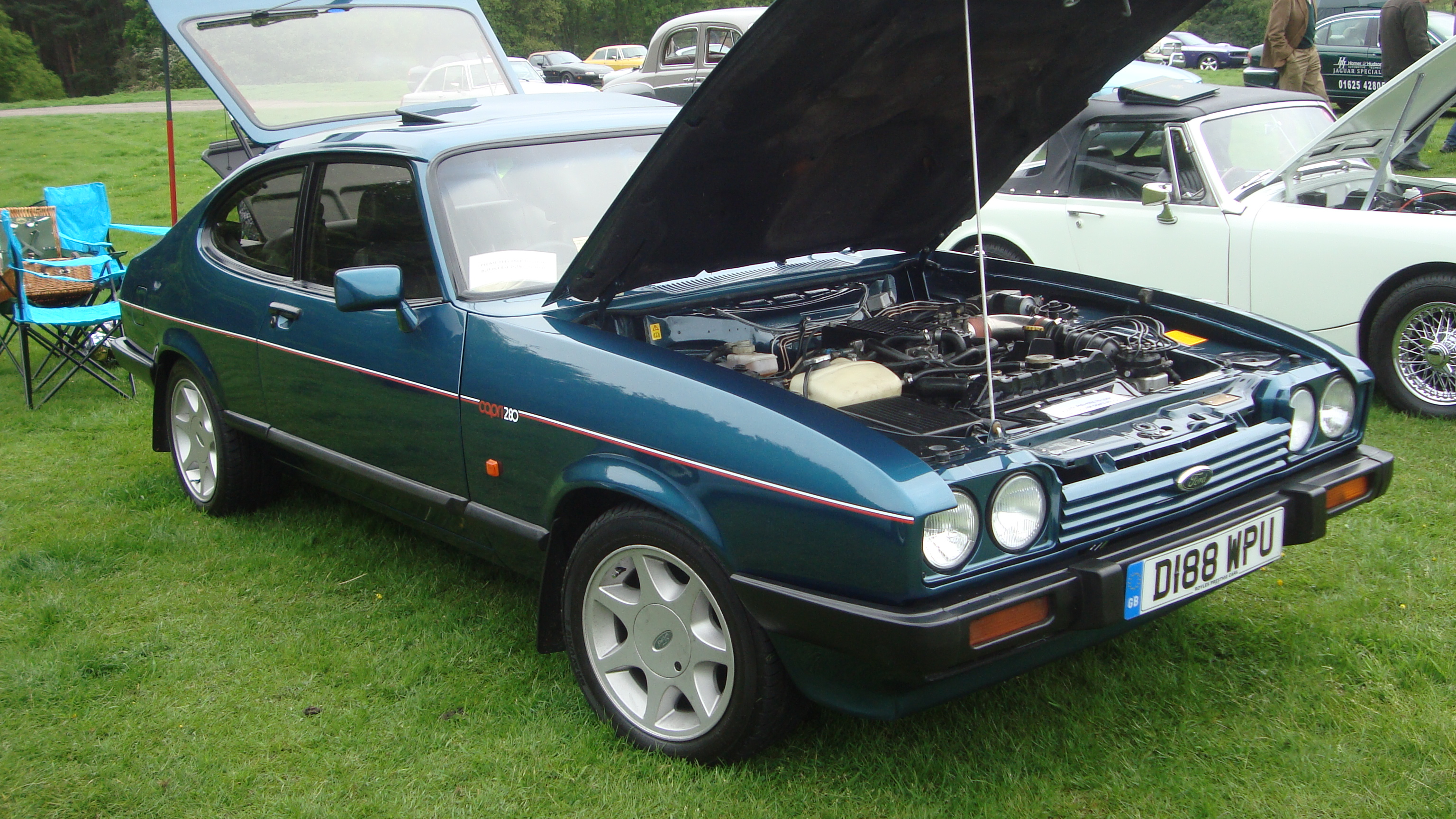

When the last Capri was made on 19 December 1986 at the Ford factory in Cologne, 1,886,647 Capris had rolled off the production lines.

The last Capri made (registered as D194 UVW) still exists today, and is owned by Ford's heritage workshop. The "Brooklands" models had a steep price tag of around £12,000 and struggled to sell. Sales continued through 1987 and 1988, with the last 280 being registered on 20 November 1989 (registration mark G749 NGP) making it also the only G-reg Capri, and the next-to-last Capri to have been registered – though it is estimated that there are 3 Capri 280s that have never been registered, one of them being a 230 HP Turbo Technics conversion, and two standard cars. Production had ended at Halewood, UK in 1976 and the Capri was made exclusively in Germany from 1976 to 1986. More than a million Mk Is were sold in Europe, the UK and North America. The Mk IIs continued to be sold in Europe, the UK and North America, though in smaller numbers and the Mk IIIs were only exported outside Europe/UK (to Asia and New Zealand) in limited numbers.

==== Engines ====
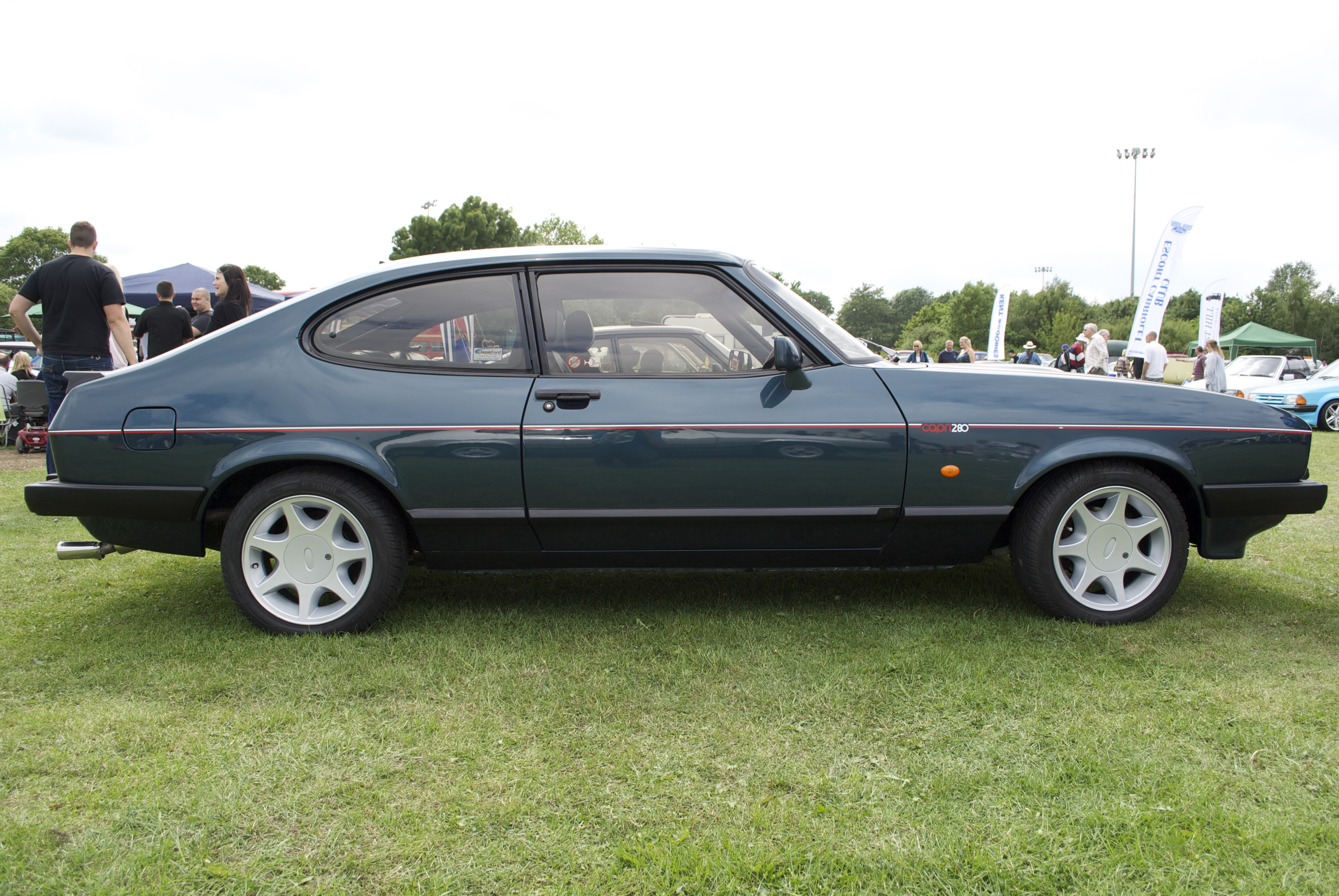
1987 Ford Capri Mk III 280

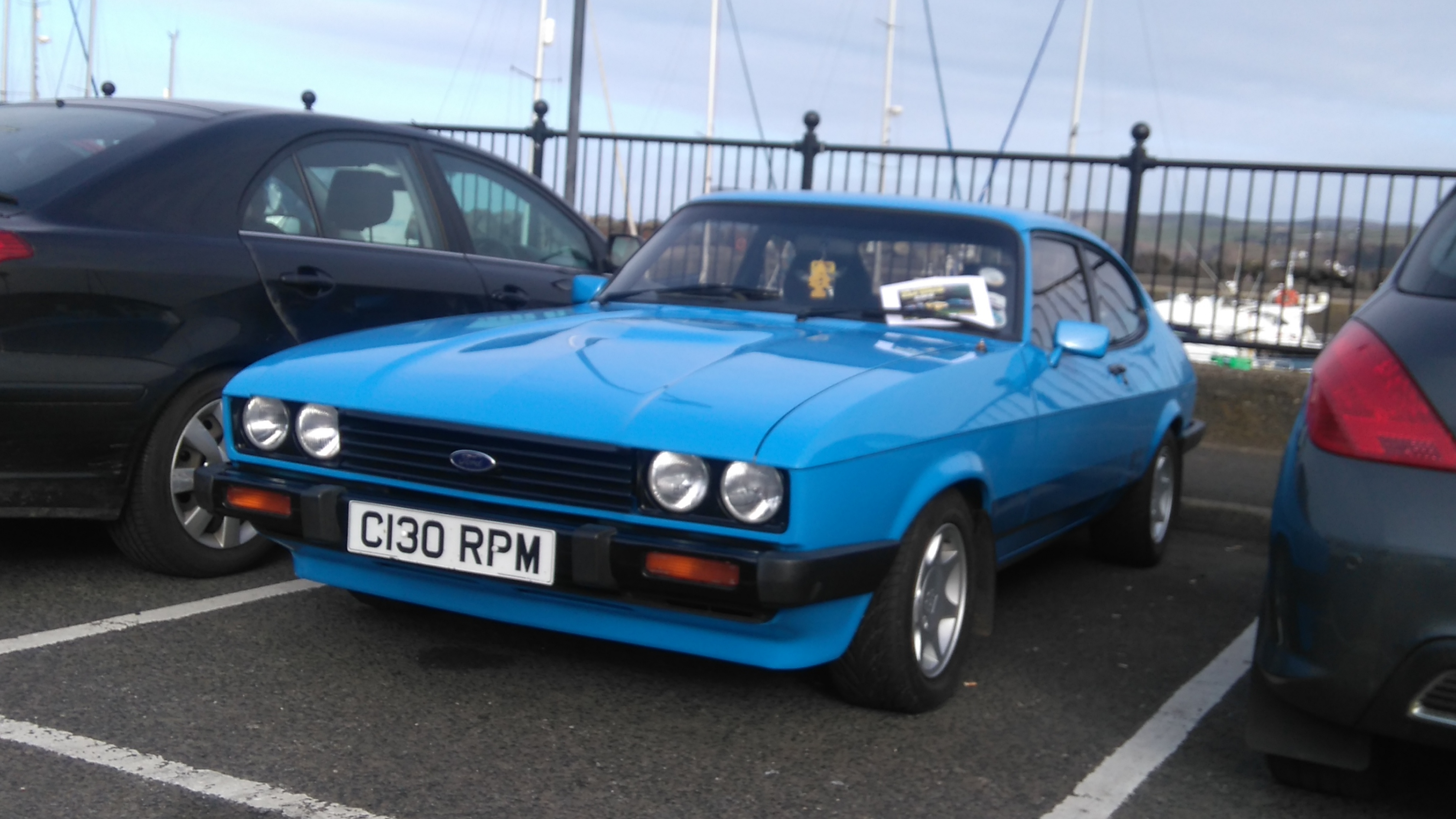
1985 Ford Capri 2.8i

Model	Displacement	Type code	Power	Top speed	0–60 mph (0–97 km/h) (s)	Years
1.3 L	1,298 cc (79.2 cu in)	Crossflow	56 hp (42 kW; 57 PS)	89 mph (143 km/h)	20.0	1978–1979
1.3 L	1,298 cc (79.2 cu in)	Crossflow	59 hp (44 kW; 60 PS)	93 mph (150 km/h)	16.4	1979–1982
1.3 GL	1,298 cc (79.2 cu in)	Crossflow	72 hp (54 kW; 73 PS)	99 mph (159 km/h)	14.0	1978–1982
1.6 LC	1,593 cc (97.2 cu in)	Pinto TL16L	67 hp (50 kW; 68 PS)	96 mph (154 km/h)	15.0	1978–1979
1.6 LC	1,593 cc (97.2 cu in)	Pinto TL16L	69 hp (51 kW; 70 PS)	96 mph (154 km/h)	15.0	1979–1980
1.6 GL/L	1,593 cc (97.2 cu in)	Pinto TL16H	73 hp (54 kW; 74 PS)	98 mph (158 km/h)	14.3	1978–1979
1.6 GL/L	1,593 cc (97.2 cu in)	Pinto TL16H	73 hp (54 kW; 74 PS)	99 mph (159 km/h)	14.3	1979–1981
1.6 GL/L	1,593 cc (97.2 cu in)	Pinto TL16H	72 hp (54 kW; 73 PS)	99 mph (159 km/h)	13.6	1981–1983
1.6 LS	1,593 cc (97.2 cu in)	Pinto TL16H	72 hp (54 kW; 73 PS)	99 mph (159 km/h)	12.8	1983–1984
1.6 Laser	1,593 cc (97.2 cu in)	Pinto TL16H	72 hp (54 kW; 73 PS)	99 mph (159 km/h)	13.5	1984–1986
1.6 S	1,593 cc (97.2 cu in)	Pinto TL16G	86 hp (64 kW; 87 PS)	106 mph (171 km/h)	12.5	1978–1979
1.6 S	1,593 cc (97.2 cu in)	Pinto TL16G	90 hp (67 kW; 91 PS)	109 mph (175 km/h)	12.0	1979–1980
2.0 V6	1,999 cc (122.0 cu in)	Cologne	89 hp (66 kW; 90 PS)	106 mph (171 km/h)	11.8	1978–1979
2.0	1,993 cc (121.6 cu in)	Pinto TL20H	97 hp (72 kW; 98 PS)	111 mph (179 km/h)	10.8	1978–1979
2.0	1,993 cc (121.6 cu in)	Pinto TL20H	99 hp (74 kW; 100 PS)	111 mph (179 km/h)	9.9	1979–1983
2.0	1,993 cc (121.6 cu in)	Pinto TL20H	99 hp (74 kW; 100 PS)	113 mph (182 km/h)	9.9	1983–1984
2.0 (Swiss)	1,993 cc (121.6 cu in)	Pinto TL20H	97 hp (72 kW; 98 PS)	111 mph (179 km/h)	?	1983–1984
2.0 Laser	1,993 cc (121.6 cu in)	Pinto TL20H	99 hp (74 kW; 100 PS)	113 mph (182 km/h)	9.9	1984–1986
2.3	2,294 cc (140.0 cu in)	Cologne	107 hp (80 kW; 108 PS)	112 mph (180 km/h)	10.4	1978–1979
2.3	2,294 cc (140.0 cu in)	Cologne	113 hp (84 kW; 115 PS)	114 mph (183 km/h)	9.7	1979–1983
2.3	2,294 cc (140.0 cu in)	Cologne	113 hp (84 kW; 115 PS)	116 mph (187 km/h)	9.5	1983–1984
2.8i	2,792 cc (170.4 cu in)	Cologne	158 hp (118 kW; 160 PS)	131 mph (211 km/h)	7.6	1981–1983
2.8i	2,792 cc (170.4 cu in)	Cologne	158 hp (118 kW; 160 PS)	131 mph (211 km/h)	7.8	1983–1984
2.8i	2,792 cc (170.4 cu in)	Cologne	158 hp (118 kW; 160 PS)	131 mph (211 km/h)	7.8	1984–1986
2.8 RS Turbo	2,792 cc (170.4 cu in)	Cologne	185 hp (138 kW; 188 PS)	137 mph (220 km/h)	7.6	1981–1982
2.8 Tickford Turbo	2,792 cc (170.4 cu in)	Cologne	205 hp (153 kW; 208 PS)	140 mph (225 km/h)	6.0	1983–1984
3.0	2,994 cc (182.7 cu in)	Essex	138 hp (103 kW; 140 PS)	123 mph (198 km/h)	8.4	1978–1981
3.0 GP1	2,994 cc (182.7 cu in)	Essex V6	170 hp (127 kW; 172 PS)	Unknown	?	1978–1980
3.0 X Series	2,994 cc (182.7 cu in)	Essex V6	185 hp (138 kW; 188 PS)	130 mph (209 km/h)	7.5	1978–1980

=== Police use ===
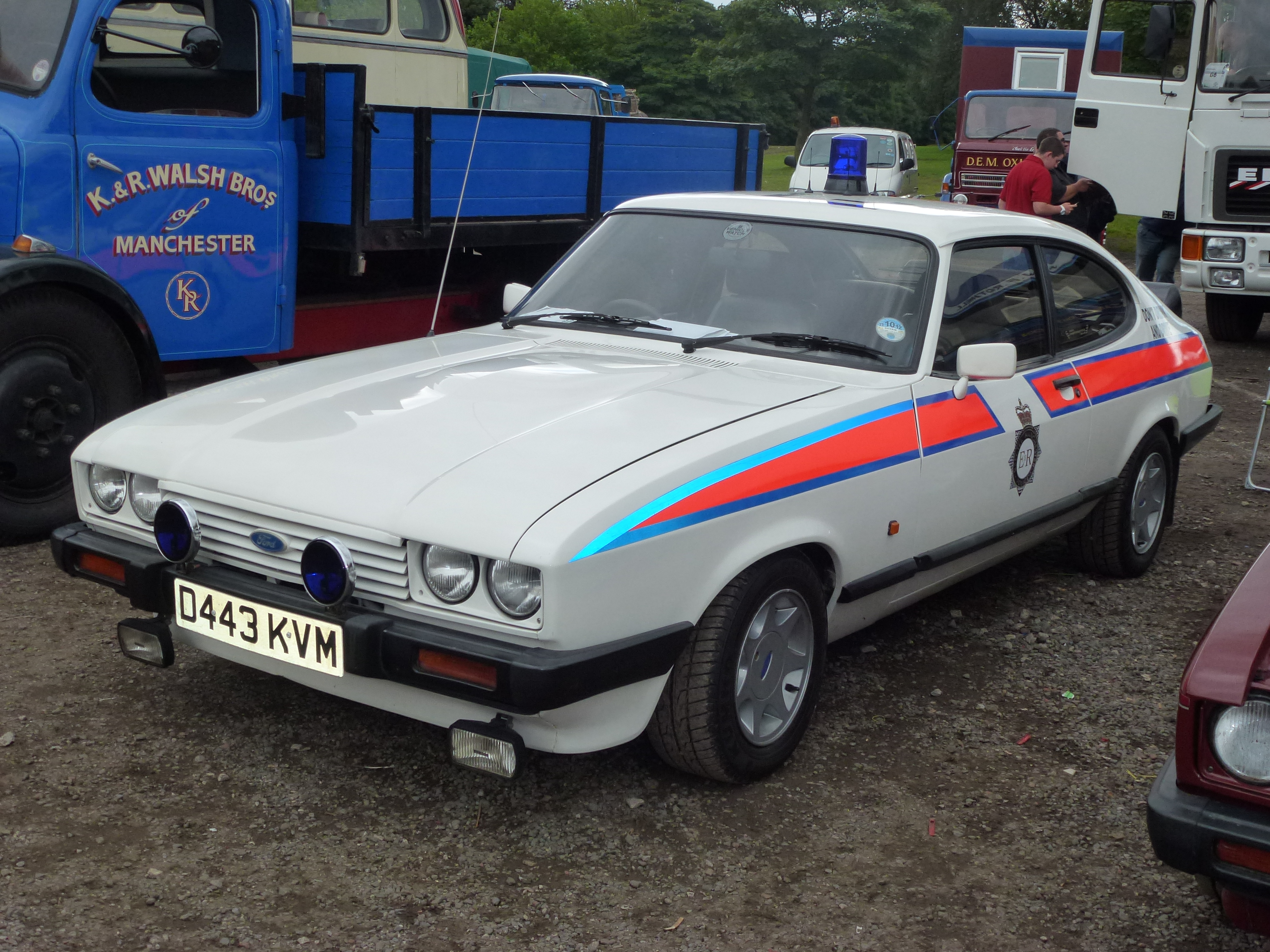
A privately restored Greater Manchester Police Mk.III 2.8 Injection Ford Capri

Throughout its production run, Ford Capris were operated by the traffic divisions of some police forces in the United Kingdom. A fleet of Mk.I 3000 GT Capris were first introduced to the Lancashire Constabulary in 1971, with further examples entering service with police forces in Merseyside, Sussex, the Royal Ulster Constabulary in Northern Ireland and Strathclyde Police in Scotland. Most notably, Ford Capris were operated extensively in the traffic division of Greater Manchester Police, as well as its predecessor Manchester and Salford Police. High-performance Capris were delivered to the force from 1971 until 1986, when a final fleet of Mk.III 2.8 Injection Capris were delivered. Greater Manchester Police eventually retired their last Mk.III 2.8i Capri in 1992, being replaced by a Ford Sierra Sapphire Cosworth. Mk.1 Ford Capris 2300 GTs were also operated by Autobahnpolizei in the state of North Rhine-Westphalia in Germany, with four entering service in Hilden in 1969.

== Outside Europe ==
=== North America ===
==== Capri ====
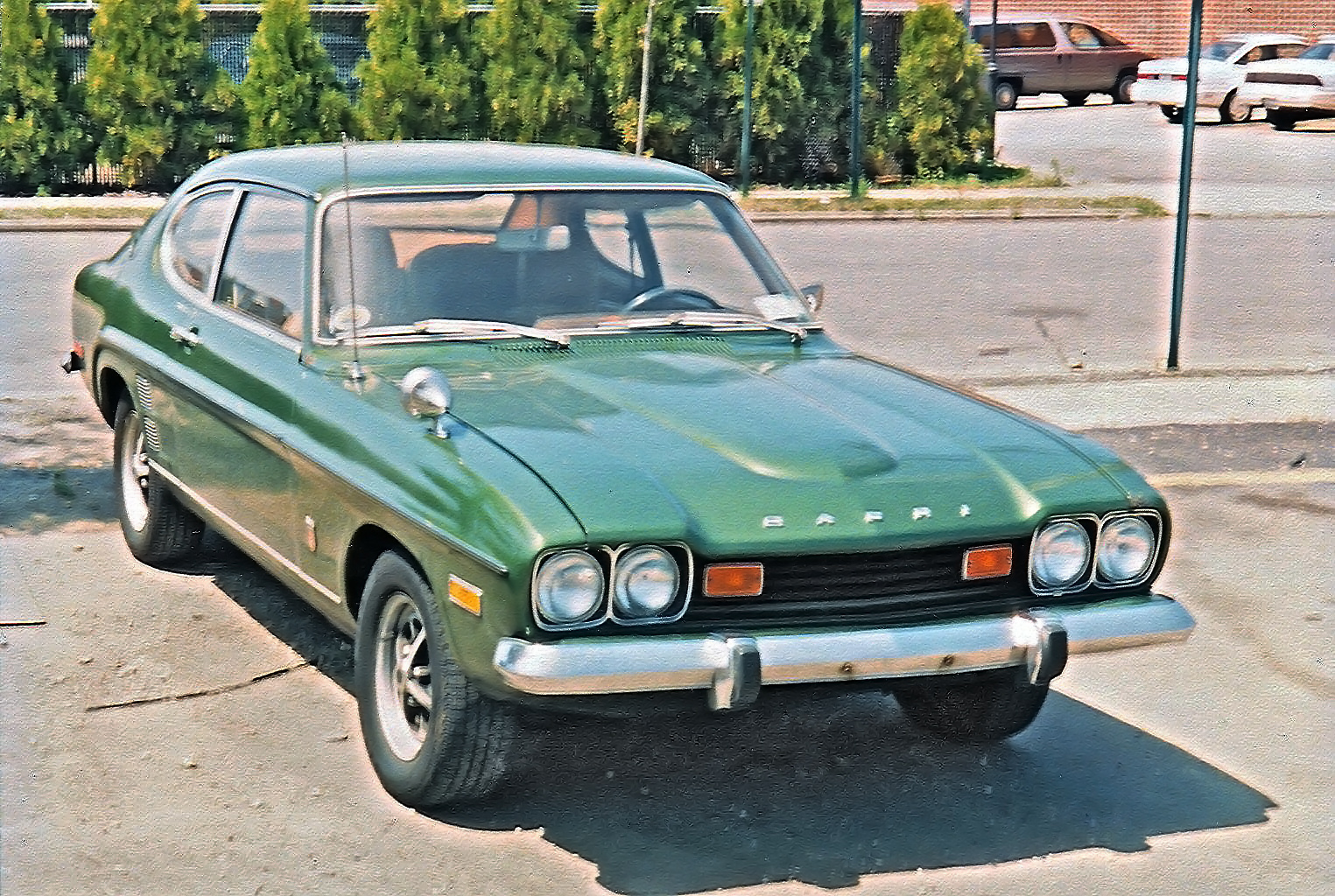
1973 Capri 2600

From 1970 to 1978, the Capri was sold in North America through Ford's Lincoln-Mercury Division. All were German-produced. Headlamps were four round sealed-beams (shared with the Capri RS3000), and turn signal lamps were grille-mounted on all US-spec 1971–74 Capris and 1976–78 Capri IIs. Full instrumentation wasn't available on 1971–72 four-cylinder models but was made standard equipment from 1973 on. An optional interior decor package, changed by name to the "Ghia" package for the Capri II, featured deluxe interior trim and features. 1973 Ford Capris were the Mk I face-lift models featuring the new grille, larger taillights and new interior and dash. The 1973 model had the federally mandated 2.5 mph front bumper for '73. The bumper was extended, the gap closed with a silver filler panel. 1974 models had larger bumpers front and rear with wraparound urethane, body-color bumper covers to meet the revised Federal front and rear 5 mph standard. 1976–78 models were the re-designed hatchback models offered worldwide since 1974, fitted with the grille-mounted turn signal lamps and the required round sealed-beam headlamps, 5 mph body-color bumpers and catalytic converter, requiring no-lead fuel. In 1976, an 'S' (JPS) special edition featured black or white paint with gold-coloured wheels, gold pin-striping, and upgraded two-tone interior in beige and black. Due to late production of Capri IIs, there were no 1975 models sold in the US (Lincoln-Mercury dealerships had an inventory of leftover 1974 models during the 1975 model year as seen on TV advertisements). Unlike the European market where the Capri was available in several trim levels and marketed as the equivalent of a Grand Touring automobile, the US/Canada market Capris were marketed as a compact sports car.

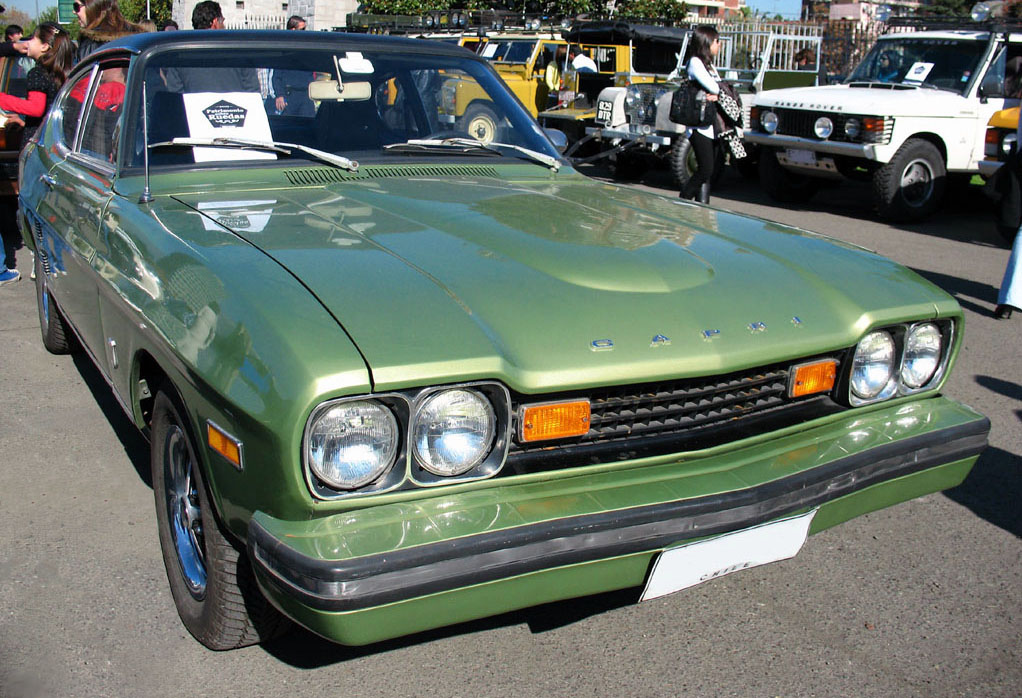
1974 Capri 2800, with bigger safety bumpers

Originally, Cologne-built Capris imported to North America were fitted only with the British 1600 OHV (1.6 L), 64 hp (48 kW) Kent engine with the four-speed manual transmission. The 1971 Capri offered the Kent-built 1600 I4 and the optional, Cologne-built OHC 2000 (2.0 L) I4 engine for improved performance with 101 hp (75 kW). An optional three-speed automatic transmission (a Ford Cruise-o-Matic C4, also shared with the Pinto) was made available with the 2000 I4 engine. In 1972–73, the 2000 I4 became the standard engine, and an OHV 2600 (2.6 L) Cologne V6 was optional, which produced 120 hp (89 kW). The 1600 I4 was dropped. For 1974, new engines were used—the OHC 2300 (2.3 L) I4 and OHV 2800 (2.8 L) Cologne V6; producing 88 hp (66 kW) and 105 hp (78 kW) respectively. The engines were carried over for the 1976–77 Capri ll hatchback models, although the V6's power had crept up to 109 hp (81 kW) at 4,800 rpm. The last Capris were brought in 1977 although sales continued into 1978. Capri sales had slid considerably by the time of the introduction of the Capri II, and the high price contributed to ending sales of German-built Capris in the US.

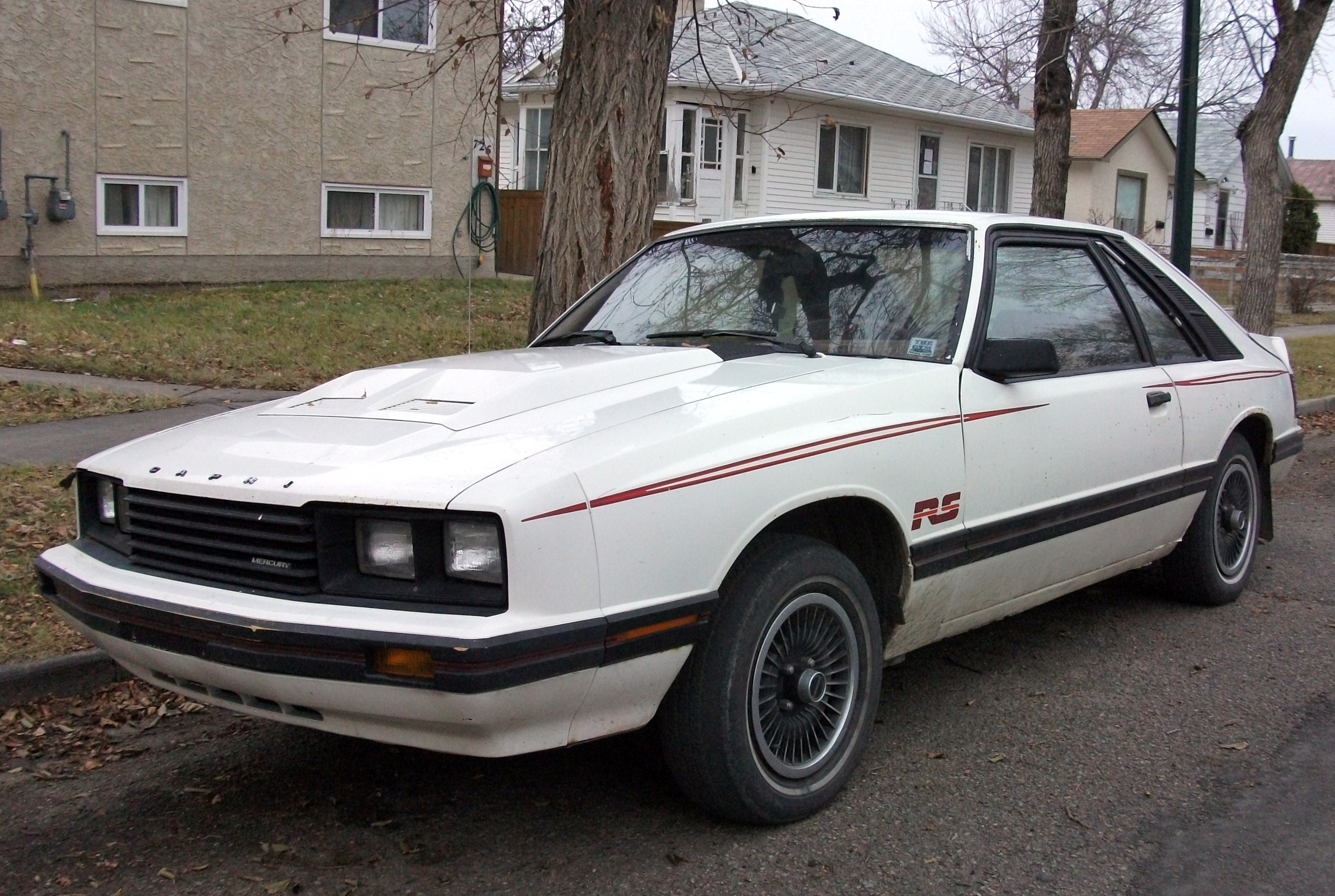
1983 Mercury Capri RS

In 1979, no longer importing the Ford Capri, but capitalising on the model's positive image, Mercury dealers began selling a new Capri that was a restyled derivative of the Fox-bodied Ford Mustang and was produced until 1986. Mercury introduced yet another Capri in 1990, but this was the Australian produced, Mazda-based, 2+2 seat, front-wheel-drive convertible.

=== Australia ===
==== Mk I (1969–1972) ====
Ford Australia assembled the European-designed Capri Mk.1 at its plant in the Sydney suburb of Homebush from March, 1969 until November, 1972. The Capri was offered in the Australian market from 3 May 1969, as the 1600 Deluxe and the 1600 GT, using the 1.6-litre Kent OHV engine. On 25 February 1970, the 3000 GT was launched, equipped with the 3.0-litre Essex V6. At the same time the 1600 GT became the 1600 XL, while the 1600 Deluxe remained unchanged.

In November 1972, production of the Capri ended in Australia, with a total of 14,638 vehicles having been assembled. In June/July, 1974, Ford Australia imported fifty RS3100 models. Ford Australia also imported four examples of the Capri II (Mk.2), albeit for show purposes only. Neither the Mk.1 facelift (except the RS3100) Capri nor the subsequent Mk.2 and Mk.3 models were produced or officially sold in Australia (though they were heavily involved in Australian motorsport and many have been privately imported). Ford Australia concentrated its sales efforts on other UK sourced products, namely the Escort and Cortina sedans.

==== SA30 (1989–1994) ====
From 1989 to 1994 Ford Australia reused the Capri name for an unrelated two-door convertible sports car, coded the SA30. The new model was exported to the United States, where it was marketed as the Mercury Capri. A small portion were sold in Australia.

=== South Africa ===
Ford of South Africa assembled the Capri from 1970 to late 1972 with a similar model range to the UK. No facelift models or RS variants were marketed in South Africa. The Essex V6 was the most common engine, as it was assembled locally – the Pinto "four" was not installed. The 1600 four and three-litre V6 were also available.

About 500 Capris were converted by specialist Basil Green Motors to run the 302 Ford Windsor V8 engine. These models were known as the Capri Perana and were very successful in local touring car events, winning the 1970 South African championship and, in a different format, the 1971 championship as well.

No Mk II and Mk III Capris were exported to, or built in South Africa.

== Motorsport ==
=== Zakspeed Ford Capri ===
Zakspeed Ford Capri
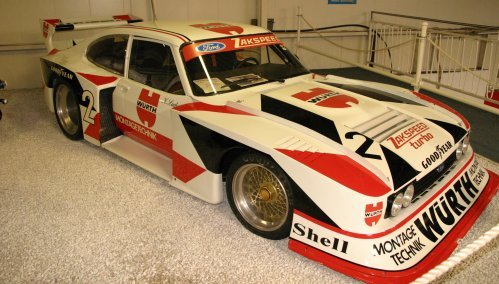
- Category: Group 5
- Constructor: Zakspeed, Ford Motorsport
- Designer: Thomas Ammerschläger

Technical specifications
- Chassis: Alloy tube structure with alloy sheet floorplan, bonded to kevlar bodypanels
- Suspension (front): Alloy wishbones, titanium concentric coil spring, gas dampers
- Suspension (rear): Alloy rear axle, radius locating arms, Watts linkage, titanium concentric coil spring, gas dampers
- Engine: Based on Cosworth BDA-Turbo 1426 cc I4 twin-turbo, FR
- Transmission: Getrag 5-speed ZF LSD with 90 percent locking efficiency
- Tyres: Goodyear 10.0/225 × 16 (front); 12.5/225 × 19 (rear)

Competition history
- Notable entrants: Ford Motorsport
- Notable drivers: Klaus Ludwig, Jochen Mass
- Debut: 1981 Group5 Season
Races	Wins	Poles
14	9	12

A Group 5 version of the Capri Mk III was built by Zakspeed to compete in the Deutsche Rennsport Meisterschaft motor racing series. Klaus Ludwig subsequently won the 1981 title. The car retained very little of the Capri. Only the roof, pillars and parts of the rear end remained. The body mainly consisted of aluminium profiles and 80 metres of aluminium tubing. The turbocharged Cosworth engine puts out approximately 530 PS (390 kW) at 9200 rpm with 1.4 bar charge; 1.6 bars were available for short periods for an extra 70 PS (51 kW).

== Revival ==
At the 2003 Frankfurt Motor Show, Ford unveiled the Visos concept. The two door coupe took numerous styling cues from the Capri.

In early 2023, there was speculation that Ford could revive the Capri nameplate in Europe as an electric sports crossover coupe, similar to the revival of the Puma nameplate in 2019. Though the Capri name has not been confirmed by Ford, instead being named the "Sport Crossover" prior to an official launch in 2024, the vehicle would be based on the Volkswagen Group MEB platform and would share technology and design cues from the 2024 Ford Explorer EV. A camouflaged pre-production vehicle would later be photographed driving around Cologne in November 2023, and the Ford Capri EV was unveiled on July 10, 2024.

== See also ==
- Ford Mustang
- Ford Probe
- Ford Puma
- Ford Visos
- Mercury Capri
- Ford Capri EV
