= Ford Visos =

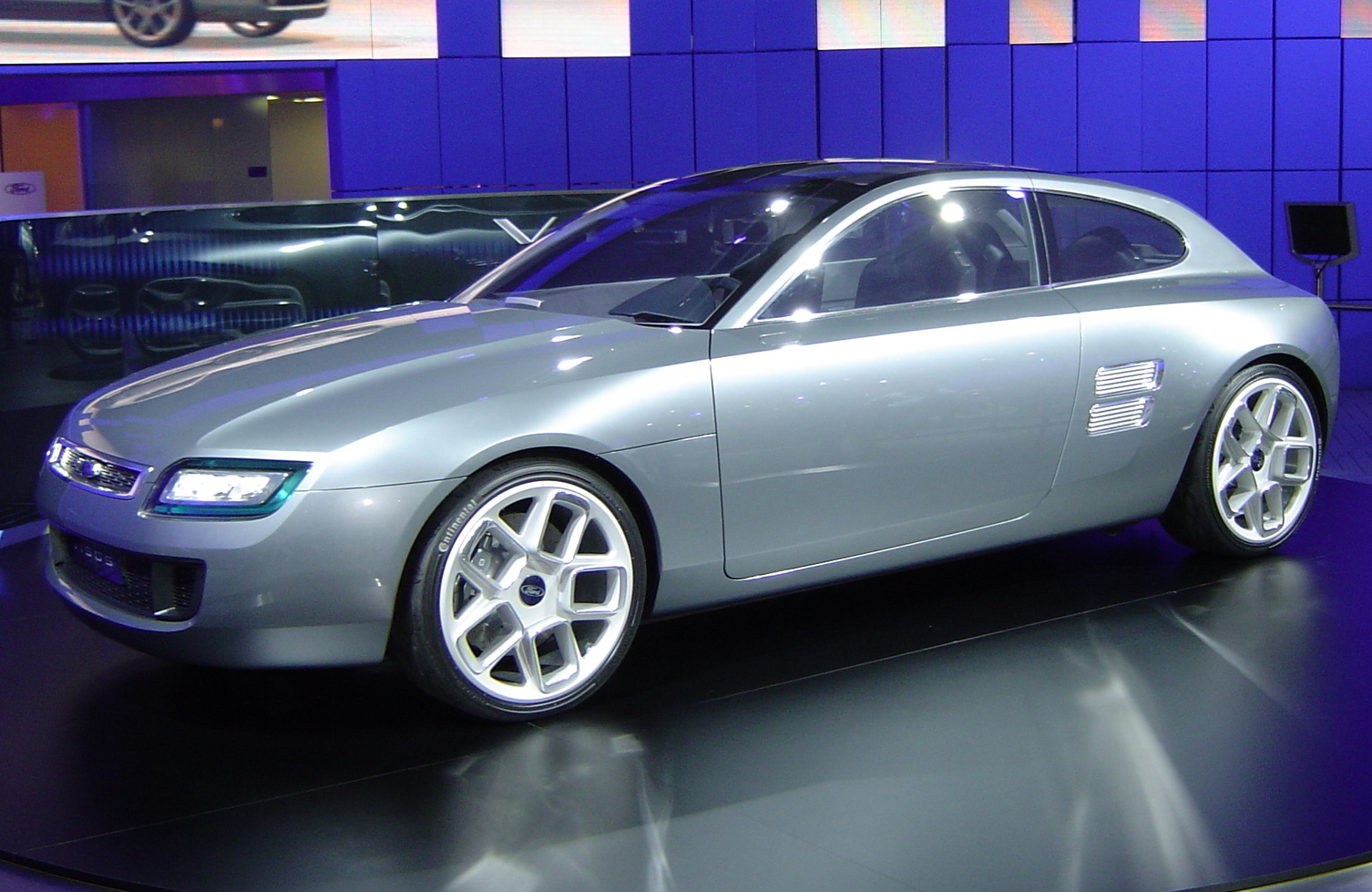
- Ford Visos at the 2003 Frankfurt Motor Show

Overview
- Manufacturer: Ford Europe
- Production: 2003
- Designer: Chris Bird

Body and chassis
- Class: Concept car
- Body style: 3-door hatchback/fastback coupe
- Layout: F4
- Platform: Ford Focus

Powertrain
- Engine: 3.0 L twin-turbocharged I6
- Transmission: 6-speed automatic

The Ford Visos was a concept car manufactured by Ford Europe and unveiled at the 2003 Frankfurt Motor Show.

== Design and features ==
=== Design ===
The Visos was a three-door, four-seater hatchback/fastback coupe with a side window line and vent details inspired by the old Ford Capri model.

=== Features ===
The interior features a futuristic liquid crystal display (LCD) dashboard developed with Sony. The seats were automatically contoured to occupant's body for a personalized sports seat experience in sport mode.

== Powertrain ==
The Visos was powered by a 3.0 L twin-turbocharged inline-six engine producing 350 hp (260 kW) and 295 lb⋅ft (400 N⋅m) of torque sending the power to all wheels. It uses a 6-speed automatic transmission.
