= Ford Rheinland =

Motor vehicle

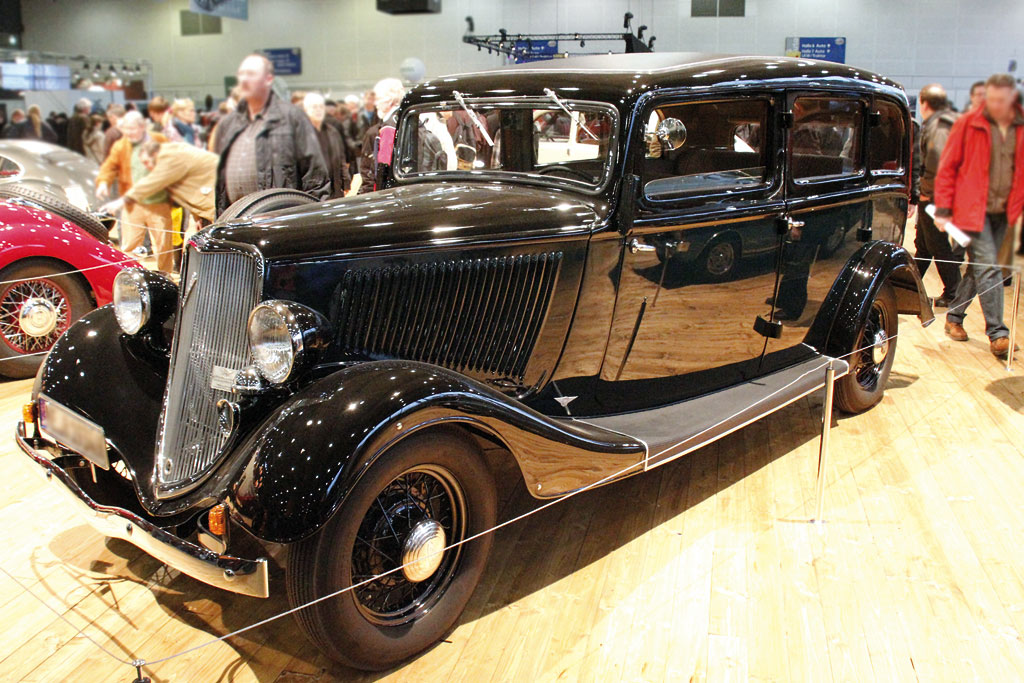
- 1934 Ford Rheinland

Overview
- Manufacturer: Ford Germany
- Production: 1933–1936; 5,575 built
- Assembly: Germany: Niehl, Cologne

Body and chassis
- Layout: FR layout
- Related: Ford Model B

Powertrain
- Engine: 3285 cc side-valve 4-cylinder 4-stroke
- Transmission: 3-speed manual with synchromesh on top two ratios

The Ford Rheinland is an automobile that was produced by Ford Germany from 1933 to 1936. The car was a German market designated Ford Model B.

The name comes from the German region of the Rhineland. In total 5,575 of them were made. The engine, taken from Model B, was a four-cylinder, four-stroke 3285 cc giving 50 hp (37 kW) at 2800 rpm.

This was the last model by Ford of Germany offering the big four-cylinder engine. After 1936, there was only the small Ford Eifel and the big Ford V8.
