= Ford-Aktion =

Union recruitment campaign

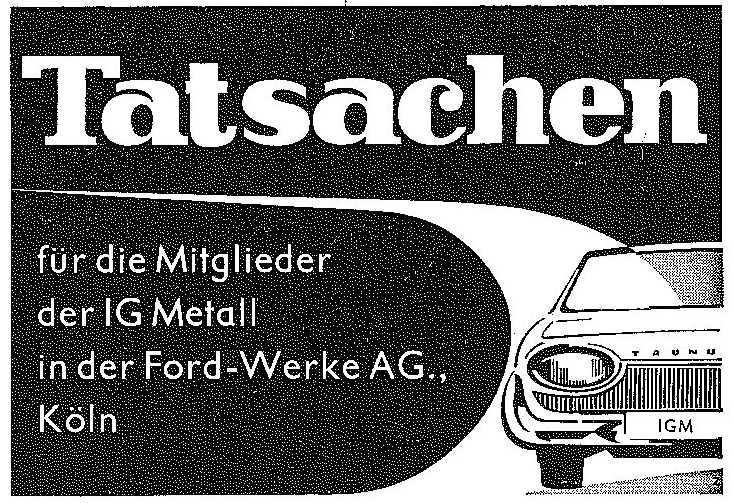
Newspaper header of the company newspaper Tatsachen of Ford-Werke AG, Cologne.

The Ford-Aktion was a campaign by IG Metall to recruit members within the workforce of the Ford-Werke in Cologne, Germany from 1960 to 1966. Hans Matthöfer, the union's education expert at the time, was the Spiritus Rector of the campaign until August 1964, which he believed should not only increase the level of unionization at Ford, but also provide impetus for a company-oriented trade union policy. He specifically involved young sociologists and members of the Sozialistischer Deutscher Studentenbund (SDS). The efforts failed due to the reaction of Ford management and conflicts internal to the trade union.

== Previous history ==
=== Initial situation at Ford ===
Only five percent of workers and two percent of employees at Ford in Köln-Niehl were members of IG Metall in 1960. Due to this extraordinarily weak level of organization, Ford was regarded by the union as a "cancer for the trade union movement in the Cologne area", because the workforce – Ford employed around 20,000 people at the time – was the least unionized in comparison with other large companies in the West German metal industry.

Ford was not a member of Metal and Electronics Industry, the employers' association for automotive sector, so no regional collective agreement was applicable. Wages and working conditions were fixed between the management and the Ford works council through works agreements. Compared to collectively agreed wages, Ford paid significantly more, but this positive wage drift was legally precarious

=== Focus actions by the trade union ===
At the end of 1960, IG Metall selected companies in various districts for so-called "focus actions" (Schwerpunktaktion) to improve the previously weak union organization and membership situation in Cologne. Ford was one of these companies. The campaign was coordinated by IG Metall's new education expert, Hans Matthöfer.

The union not only hoped to improve the level of worker organization in companies that were historically hard to reach, but also to raise the level of unionization in the metal industry as a whole, which had been declining since the early 1950s.

=== Ford and trade unions ===
Matthöfer had long had excellent contacts with the United Automobile Workers (UAW). In 1941, after long battles, this American trade union had succeeded in organizing the Ford plant at headquarters in Dearborn near Detroit. If the Ford campaign in Germany had been successful, many of its elements could have been implemented in other companies, according to the plan. The company also stood for an epoch-making work organization: Fordism. Ford ended up expanding its market share in the growing German automotive industry.

The contacts with the UAW went back to Matthöfer's stay in the US. He had studied at the University of Wisconsin in Madison from August 1950 to June 1951. The focus of his studies had been on industrial relations as well as the theory and practice of American trade unions. He had also come into contact with the Independent Socialist League around Max Shachtman, a minor party oriented towards democratic socialism with influence in the UAW. In this way, Matthöfer had become familiar with the breadth of democratic socialism, how to deal with unconventional ideas and practical ways to improve trade union work on the ground.

=== Company-related trade union policy ===
For Matthöfer, Ford was interesting because the campaign for a regional collective agreement was the starting point for what could have become a company-oriented trade union policy. In the dispute, he was concerned with the opportunity to closely interlink a company-based collective bargaining policy, co-determination in the workplace and company-related educational work, even under difficult circumstances. For him, focusing trade union work on workplace issues was crucial to giving it new momentum. According to Matthöfer, looking back in 1968, it was intended to call on trade union members to get involved on the ground, especially in the workplace, so that the dangers of union bureaucratization and paralyzing routines could be averted; the goal was a democratization of conditions. The question of power should not only be posed in companies, but also in the trade union itself. Decisions would be made less by union executive committees and district leaders and more in company committees, for example company bargaining committees. At a grassroots level, the aim would be to activate union members, recruit new members, influence working conditions and negotiate wages and salaries.

The central players in this process were not primarily to be the trade union representatives or works councils, but the so-called Bildungsobleute (education officers). These activists were trained in large numbers by the education department under Matthöfer's leadership – in 1967 there were already 4,000 – and equipped with modern teaching materials. Learning was to be based on the students' current and everyday work experiences. With the help of these education representatives, it was promising to get deadlocked conflicts between companies and trade unions moving through flexible and direct action in companies. This was to become a place of struggle, learning and change. The aim was to raise awareness and commitment among trade union members and to overcome the stagnation of class disputes, which was perceived as a danger. Overall, it was a project to renew the trade unions from within. Matthöfer developed his considerations with recourse to military strategy. Explanations by Basil Liddell Hart and findings of West German industrial and business sociology, which had already formed in the 1950s as a circle of interested actors, empirically working sociologists, and as a section of the German Sociological Association.

== Implementation ==
=== Information procurement ===
Initially, little information was available about the specific working conditions and the working atmosphere at Ford. This was mainly due to the reduced level of union organization. The hesitant and defensive position of the Cologne administrative office of IG Metall, which feared for its influence, and the largely autonomous works council under the leadership of Peter Görres, an old-style charismatic labor leader, also played a role.

The information was obtained through a subversive study on the working climate. The Frankfurt Institute for Social Research was commissioned to carry out the survey in 1961. It was conducted by Frankfurt sociology students, most of whom belonged to the SDS. 50 unionized and 50 non-unionized employees were interviewed in semi-standardized home interviews. Manfred Teschner and Michael Schumann led the study and analyzed it.

Two key findings emerged regardless of the union membership of the interviewees. Firstly, the pace of work was considered extremely stressful due to the high speed of the assembly line. It demanded a very high level of performance from the workers. On the other hand, the interviewees criticized the arbitrariness of superiors. The focus here was on "nose bonuses", which the foremen could arbitrarily grant or withdraw as a performance bonus. The interviews also revealed a surprisingly high willingness to join the union. The low level of organization was therefore obviously not related to the fact that Ford workers were satisfied and considered unions to be fundamentally superfluous. There was also widespread skepticism towards the works council, which lacked contact with the rank and file.

=== Company newspaper ===
At the beginning of 1961, Matthöfer launched a company newspaper, the Tatsachen. The title was based on the Ford Facts, the UAW's periodical for Ford employees. It followed the motto of the anarcho-syndicalist Industrial Workers of the World union: To Fan the Flames of Discontent. Matthöfer was active as editor, as press law officer (from 1963), as editor and often also as author for this newspaper. Tatsachen, this collective organizer, was intended to disseminate trade union discourse and information, motivate people to join the union, promote a company master agreement and dispel myths about conditions at Ford. These myths included the claim that the rate of accidents at work at Ford was below average. Tatsachen refuted this claim with figures and in this way encouraged a drastic reduction in the number of accidents through the training and deployment of safety officers. The medium picked up on the issues that led to particularly high levels of dissatisfaction with the work. To address the many Catholics in the workforce, Matthöfer repeatedly made references to Catholic social teaching.

=== Covert actions ===
Matthöfer had two consecutive supporters in the Cologne administrative office of IG Metall. Right at the beginning of the Ford action, the first, Theo Röhrig, succeeded in obtaining a complete set of punch cards from the Ford workforce. Their evaluation and comparison with Ford organization plans revealed which employees were to be targeted when it came to key points in the production process, including in the event of strikes. The punch cards were also the basis for detailed card indexes of employees according to union membership, place of residence, gender, age group and origin. Röhrig's successor in the administrative office was Karl Krahn, a trained automotive mechanic, assembly line worker at Ford and later chair for industrial sociology at Bielefeld University. However, he was dismissed after he criticized the IG Metall representative of the Cologne district at a trade union meeting for his massive obstruction of the Ford campaign.

The most spectacular action was the collaboration of Günter Wallraff, then at the beginning of his career. Through the mediation of Jakob Moneta, editor-in-chief of Metall and friend of Matthöfer, he worked in Ford's painting line and wrote several articles about it for Metall. Later compiled into a book with other reports, they achieved high circulation.

=== First achievements ===
The number of union members increased and rose from 3,286 in 1962 to 4,002 in 1963. The circulation of Tatsachen also increased. The activists gained increasing influence over the works council and the shop stewards. In April 1963, the new works council was elected, and the activists prevailed. As new members, they filled 25 of the 28 seats on this body, and the candidates supported by Tatsachen received the most votes in the elections. The new works council chairman was also a supporter of the Ford campaign.

=== Ford's membership of the association and strike preparations ===
The next step in the campaign was to negotiate a company collective agreement. However, before this was discussed between the potential contractual partners for the first time in October 1963 after long delays, Ford had joined the employers' association, on 1 May 1963. Ford management claimed that the working conditions, wages and salaries agreed in the regional collective agreement would apply. IG Metall, on the other hand, emphasized that the existing regional collective agreement did not contain any wage negotiation framework conditions. From the union's point of view, there was therefore no obligation to peace, that is, a halt in its efforts. Ford's recent membership in the employers' association was a step backward in terms of negotiating affairs, as it meant that collective bargaining decisions were not made in the company itself, but rather at a distance. On the side of the union, the functionaries in the Cologne district administration and the Frankfurt union executive committee took over responsibility. The Ford campaign thus lost "its previous experimental scope". However, the management board led by Otto Brenner initially adopted a harsh tone and threatened to strike if negotiations on a company collective agreement were not reached. Matthöfer and his colleagues organized everything necessary to be prepared for such an industrial action, which in their plan was to take place in March or April 1964. With the help of a second survey carried out by infas in spring 1964 IG Metall once again surveyed the mood among the workforce. The survey showed, among other things, support for a company collective agreement and a high willingness to strike, both among IG Metall members and those who were not organized. As talks with the employers did not materialize, the union executive board declared the failure of the negotiations in May 1964. The strike ballot was set for 22 June.

=== Legal disputes and compromise ===
Ford's management under its American boss John S. Andrews responded with a preliminary injunction, which prohibited the union from holding the ballot. The union's objection was finally rejected on 26 June 1964. The subsequent judicial clarification followed the ruling opinion: Because the regional collective agreement applied to Ford, the union had to adhere to the peace obligation, and ballots were not permissible.

Eventually, the Cologne district manager of IG Metall proved to be a brake on any further initiative to reach a company collective agreement. In a select meeting with Gesamtmetall, the executive board of IG Metall sought a face-saving solution. This consisted of the following arrangement: The union recognized the priority of the sectoral collective agreement and also the obligation to maintain peace. In return, negotiations were to begin immediately on a regulation for Ford to supplement the regional collective agreement; the pay and working conditions were to apply as a supplementary agreement to the regional collective agreement until a new regional collective agreement was reached, that surpasses this supplementary agreement. This compromise still offered opportunities to reach a company collective agreement. However, the employers' side was reluctant to accept anything that resembled this kind of agreement. More important, however, was the disagreement among the employees: the Cologne district manager of IG Metall wanted little more than to secure the previous wage drift. The line speed, bonus regulations or the organization of substitute workers were of little concern to him. Due to these disagreements, no supplementary agreement to the collective one was reached. In the end, only a company agreement remained.

== Results ==
=== Membership growth and committees ===
Hans Matthöfer withdrew from the leadership of the campaign in August 1964 because his influence on the events in Cologne had diminished. In 1966, he wrote the official final report, which made it clear that the number of union members had grown from 1,000 to 7,000, which meant an annual increase in income from membership fees of around half a million DM. The degree of organization in the surrounding companies in the metal industry had also increased because there was traditionally a high fluctuation at Ford. Looking back, Karl Krahn also counted the establishment of a works council, which aimed to tackle internal problems and grievances, and the now union-oriented body of shop stewards among the successes.

=== Targets not achieved ===
However, they did not succeed in establishing a company-based trade union policy. Hans Matthöfer had set high goals for himself and his colleagues as of May 1963: The standard of living of Ford workers was to rise through higher wages and more vacations; working conditions were to improve; things were to be fairer negotiated in wage determination; co-determination in the workplace was to be enforced; the accident rate was to be reduced and occupational safety increased; a unionization rate of 80 percent was aimed for; the cadre of shop stewards was to comprise 800 men; a company-based collective agreement was to be achieved. In view of this benchmark, the Ford campaign was a failure.

=== Spanish echo ===
The campaign generated a distant echo after the death of Franco (1975) in Spain. Under the leadership of Carlos Pardo, a socialist supported by Hans Matthöfer, the employees of SEAT were enlisted by the socialist trade union Unión General de Trabajadores (UGT) from 1977, following the example of the Ford campaign. In some SEAT plants, the UGT outperformed the communist union Comisiones Obreras (CC.OO).

== Research ==
=== Critical observations ===
In 1974, one year after the sensational wildcat strike at Ford, the three Frankfurt law students Volker Delp, Lothar Schmidt and Klaus Wohlfahrt discussed the Ford campaign. They asked to what extent the Ford action had already created the framework conditions that led to the Turkish guest workers striking at Ford almost a decade later. The workers on strike at Ford were not supported by the union representatives, the works council and IG Metall and were perceived as troublemakers by many German colleagues. According to the thesis, the Ford campaign failed in the first half of the 1960s because there was an alliance between the Cologne IG Metall administrative office and the majority of the Frankfurt trade union executive committee. These two groups had rejected a company-oriented trade union and collective bargaining policy and only used the latter as an advertising promise to gain members. The students' contribution is considered to overlook the differences between the Cologne district administration and the Frankfurt headquarters, which became apparent in the negotiations for a company collective agreement following the ban on the strike ballot (end of June 1964). They also went so far as to argue that the shop stewards' body had been corrupted following the Ford campaign. The complex intra-union contradictions were thus "reduced to a basic apparatus conflict".

Peter Birke dealt with the Ford action in a section of his dissertation on wildcat strikes in Germany and Denmark, published in 2007. It had been a "brainchild", the group around Matthöfer had thought like traditional labor functionaries. Birke also addressed the relationship between IG Metall and Turkish guest workers. He saw this as one of the factors that led to the failure of the Ford campaign. The proportion of mostly Turkish workers in the workforce at the Ford plant in Cologne had already exceeded 30 percent in 1964; the concept chosen by the group around Matthöfer had remained powerless in view of this serious change within the workforce.

=== Social sciences and trade unions ===
Klaus Peter Wittemann, a long-time employee at the Sociological Research Institute Göttingen, dealt with the Ford campaign on several occasions. Several essays addressed the subject as early as the mid-1980s. Wittemann published a 300-page monograph in 1994. It was written as part of the project "Industrial Sociology and IG Metall". It was part of the German Research Foundation's priority program entitled "Contexts of use of social science results". His contributions discussed the possibilities and limits of cooperation between trade unionists and politically left-wing social scientists. Wittemann regarded the Ford action as a case study of such interaction, in which both sides showed a great interest in the company, the place that shaped workers. For Wittemann, the essential thing was the use of the sociological knowledge acquired. For him, the optimal case was when "the new knowledge enables the users to discover resources in the given conditions of action that can be used to change practice".

Wittemann measured the Ford campaign against Matthöfer's strategy of actually mobilizing employees and union members and bringing about changes in power in the company and society through a company-oriented trade union policy. In relation to these goals, he also stated that it had failed.

=== Biographical classification ===
In his comprehensive biography of Hans Matthöfer, the economic historian Werner Abelshauser placed the Ford campaign in the context of Matthöfer's life. Abelshauser drew attention to the fact that its protagonist tackled three extensive projects simultaneously at the end of 1960: the Ford campaign, the restructuring of the education system at IG Metall and his (successful) candidacy for a Mandate for the German Bundestag. Matthöfer combined broad strategic considerations with detailed work in planning and implementing the campaign. Abelshauser also described the outcome of the Ford action as a defeat for Matthöfer, although he never admitted it. After the Ford campaign, Matthöfer also worked on other key campaigns, for example at VDO Adolf Schindling AG, AEG and Siemens. But even in these cases, which Matthöfer regarded as case studies for educational work, successes that went well beyond increased membership figures failed to materialize.

== Literature ==
- Werner Abelshauser: Nach dem Wirtschaftswunder. Der Gewerkschafter, Politiker und Unternehmer Hans Matthöfer. Dietz, Bonn 2009, ISBN 978-3-8012-4171-1.
- Peter Birke: Wilde Streiks im Wirtschaftswunder. Arbeitskämpfe, Gewerkschaften und soziale Bewegungen in der Bundesrepublik und Dänemark. Campus, Frankfurt / New York 2007, ISBN 978-3-593-38444-3.
- Klaus Peter Wittemann: Ford-Aktion. Zum Verhältnis von Industriesoziologie und IG Metall in den sechziger Jahren. Schüren, Marburg 1994, ISBN 978-3-89472-108-4.
- Karl Krahn: Die Schwerpunktaktion der IG Metall in den Kölner Ford-Werken von 1960–1966. In: Helmut Schmidt, Walter Hesselbach (Hrsg.): Kämpfer ohne Pathos. Festschrift für Hans Matthöfer zum 60. Geburtstag am 25. September 1985. Editorial office: Gerhard Beier. Publisher Neue Gesellschaft, Bonn 1985, ISBN 3-87831-414-0, p. 38–43.
- Michael Schumann, Klaus Peter Wittemann: Betriebsnahe Politik – fast vergessener Versuch einer gewerkschaftlichen Offensive. In: Helmut Schmidt, Walter Hesselbach (Hrsg.): Kämpfer ohne Pathos. Festschrift für Hans Matthöfer zum 60. Geburtstag am 25. September 1985. Editor: Gerhard Beier. Verlag Neue Gesellschaft, Bonn 1985, ISBN 3-87831-414-0, p. 44–49.
- Klaus Peter Wittemann: Industriesoziologie und IG Metall. Zum Verhältnis von „interner" und „externer" Sozialwissenschaft. In: SOFI-Mitteilungen. Nr. 10, Göttingen 1984, p. 22–28. (sofi-goettingen.de)
- Volker Delp, Lothar Schmidt, Klaus Wohlfahrt (1974), "Gewerkschaftliche Betriebspolitik bei Ford", in Otto Jacobi, Walther Müller-Jentsch,Eberhard Schmidt (ed.), Gewerkschaften und Klassenkampf. Kritisches Jahrbuch '74, Frankfurt: Fischer Taschenbuch, pp. 161–175, ISBN 3-436-01969-0.
