= Ford Sidevalve engine =

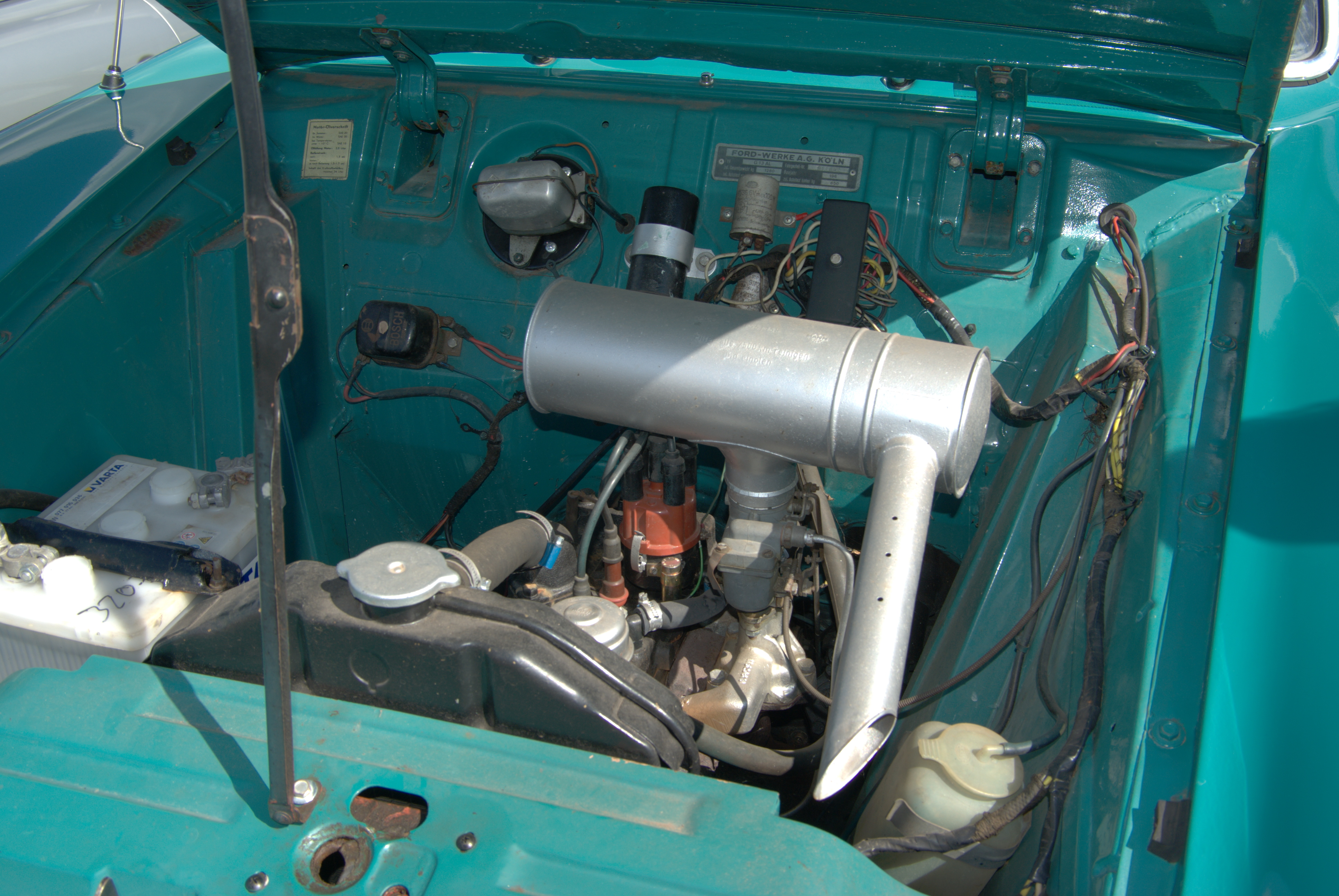

Overview
- Manufacturer: Ford Motor Company
- Also called: Ford Flathead engine
- Production: 1932–1962

Layout
- Configuration: Naturally aspirated I4
- Displacement: 933 cc (56.9 cu in); 1,172 cc (71.5 cu in)
- Cylinder block material: Cast iron
- Cylinder head material: Cast iron
- Valvetrain: Sidevalve 2 valves per cyl.
- Compression ratio: 6.0:1

Combustion
- Fuel system: Carburettor
- Fuel type: Leaded Gasoline
- Cooling system: Thermosiphon (pump was only fitted after 1953)

Output
- Power output: 36 hp (27 kW)

Chronology
- Predecessor: None
- Successor: Ford Kent engine Ford Taunus V4 engine

The Ford Sidevalve is a flathead engine from the British arm of the Ford Motor Company. Also referred to as the "English Sidevalve", the engine had its origins in the 1930s Ford Model Y, and was made in two sizes; the 933 cc (56.9 cu in) "8 HP", and the 1,172 cc (71.5 cu in) "10 HP".

== History ==
Early Ford Sidevalve engines did not have a water pump as standard, instead relying on thermosiphon cooling as the Model T engine had. A water pump was added in 1953 for the 100E models when the engine was re-engineered to the point that few specifications are identical between the early and the later series. The Sidevalve engine was used in many smaller Fords as well as farm vehicles, commercial vehicles and a marine version in boats. Production of the engine was stopped in 1962. Windscreen wipers were often driven by the vacuum generated in the inlet manifold.

The Sidevalve engine was also used in German Fords, starting with the Ford Köln in 1932 and ending with the last rear-wheel drive Ford Taunus P1 12M (G13/G13AL) in 1962. Early further research and development were being carried out at the German Ford engine plant in Cologne to improve the engine for ease of use in the Taunus line of cars, including a 44 hp 1.5 developed from the 1172 cc for the Taunus G93A but this work was finally halted in 1942.

Ford of Germany would later make use of the work on the 1.5 development of the 1.2 Sidevalve and convert it to a 55 hp 1498 cc Overhead-Valve design for the 1955 Ford Taunus 15M P1, which would later be further enlarged to a 60 hp 1698 cc for the 1957 Ford Taunus 17M P2 and 70–75 hp 1758 cc for the 1960 Ford Taunus 17M/TS 1750 P3 until production ceased in 1964.

It was replaced by the Kent engine in Britain and by the Taunus V4 engine in Germany.

== Modifications ==
Many ways were explored to enhance the power output of the standard engine, most notably special exhaust manifolds, twin carburettors, stiffer valve springs, thinner cylinder head gaskets and modified camshafts. The most hardcore performance tuning available was the Inlet Over Exhaust (IOE) cylinder head conversion from Willment and Elva, which could be built to produce 70+ BHP

== Power rating ==
The nominal horsepower quoted for each engine size comes from the British method of power calculation for road taxation purposes, and bears no relationship with the actual power output. Displacement, cylinder diameter, stroke, and number of cylinders determined the power for road taxation purposes.

== Gearbox & transmission ==
A three-speed gearbox was fitted as standard; three forward and one reverse. Several ways of improving the performance through modifications to the gearbox and transmission train were applied; replacement close ratio gears fitted to gearbox, overdrive gears fitted behind the original gearbox and higher ratio crown & pinion gears fitted to the differential unit on the back axle.

== Applications ==
=== Ford cars ===
- Ford Model Y (1932–1937)
- Ford Model C (1934–1937)
- Ford 7W (1937–1938)
- Ford 7Y (1937–1939)
- Ford Anglia E04A, E494A (1939–1953)
- Ford Prefect E93A, E493A (1938–1953)
- Ford Popular 103e (1953–1959)
- 100E series
  - Ford Prefect (1953–1959)
  - Ford Anglia (1953–1959)
  - Ford Squire (1955–1959)
  - Ford Escort (1955–1961)
  - Ford Popular (1959–1962)
- Ford Köln (1932–1935)
- Ford Eifel (1935–1939)
- Ford Taunus G93A (1939–1951)
- Ford Taunus 12M first generation (1952–1959)
- Ford Taunus 12M second generation (1959–1962)

=== Other makers or models ===
- Ashley
- Autobee Pacemaker
- Buckler
- Concordette
- Convair
- Dellow
- Fairthorpe Electron
- Falcon
  - Caribbean
  - Bermuda
- Ginetta Cars
  - Fairlite
  - G2
  - G3 (Also called Fairlite)
- Gregory
- Hud
- Lotus
  - Mk2
  - Mk4
  - 6
  - 7 S1
- Martin
- Mazengrabs
- Morgan
  - F4
  - 4/4 Series II
  - F4/F2
  - F Super
- Naco Estate
- Nota
- Paramount
- Rochdale
  - C-type
  - F-type
  - MkVI
  - ST
  - GT
  - Riviera
- Shirley
- Speedex Sirocco GT
- Streamliner
- TVR
  - Grantura I
  - Tornado
  - Typhoon
- Cannon
  - Trials Car

== Ancillary equipment, designers & other related information ==
- Aquaplane, manufacturer of dedicated exhaust and inlet manifolds for the Ford sidevalve engine, also aluminium alloy cylinder heads etc.
- Leslie Ballamy, designer of split front suspension used on many Ford "specials"
- Buckler Cars manufactured 1172 Formula racing cars using a space frame chassis and the 4 cylinder English Ford Sidevalve engine and other Buckler sporting cars using similar equipment. Manufacturer of close-ratio gears, special axle ratios, and all types of engine tuning equipment for the 4 cylinder sidevalve engines.
- Willment in the UK, designed and manufactured IOE valve cylinder heads for the side valve engines.
- Elva Engineering in the U.K. designed and manufactured overhead inlet valve conversion cylinder heads for this sidevalve engine, also complete sports/racing cars and other tuning parts.

== Bibliography ==
- Cars and Car Conversions, "Tuning SU Carburettors", Speed and Sports Publications Ltd, (1968).
- G B Wake, "Ford Special Builders Manual", J H Haynes & Co Ltd.
- Philip H. Smith, "The Ford Ten Competition Engine", G T Foulis & Co. Ltd. A complete tuning manual.
- John Haynes, "Building a Ford 10 Special", Auto Publications, London.
- John Mills, "The Constructions of Ford Specials", B T Batsford, London.
- Bill Cooper, "Tuning Side-Valve Fords", Speed and Sports Publications Ltd, (1969).
- Miriam Nyhan, "Are You Still Below", The Collins Press, (2007) — The Ford Marina Plant, Cork, 1917–1984. ISBN 9781905172498
- Ford Motor Company, "Anglia-Prefect Repair Manual"
- Dave Turner, "Ford Popular and the Small Sidevalves", Osprey Publishing Ltd, (1984). ISBN 1-90308-804-6
- Bill Ballard, "English & Australian Small Fords", Ellery Publications, (2002). ISBN 1 876 720 07 7
