= Ford Köln =

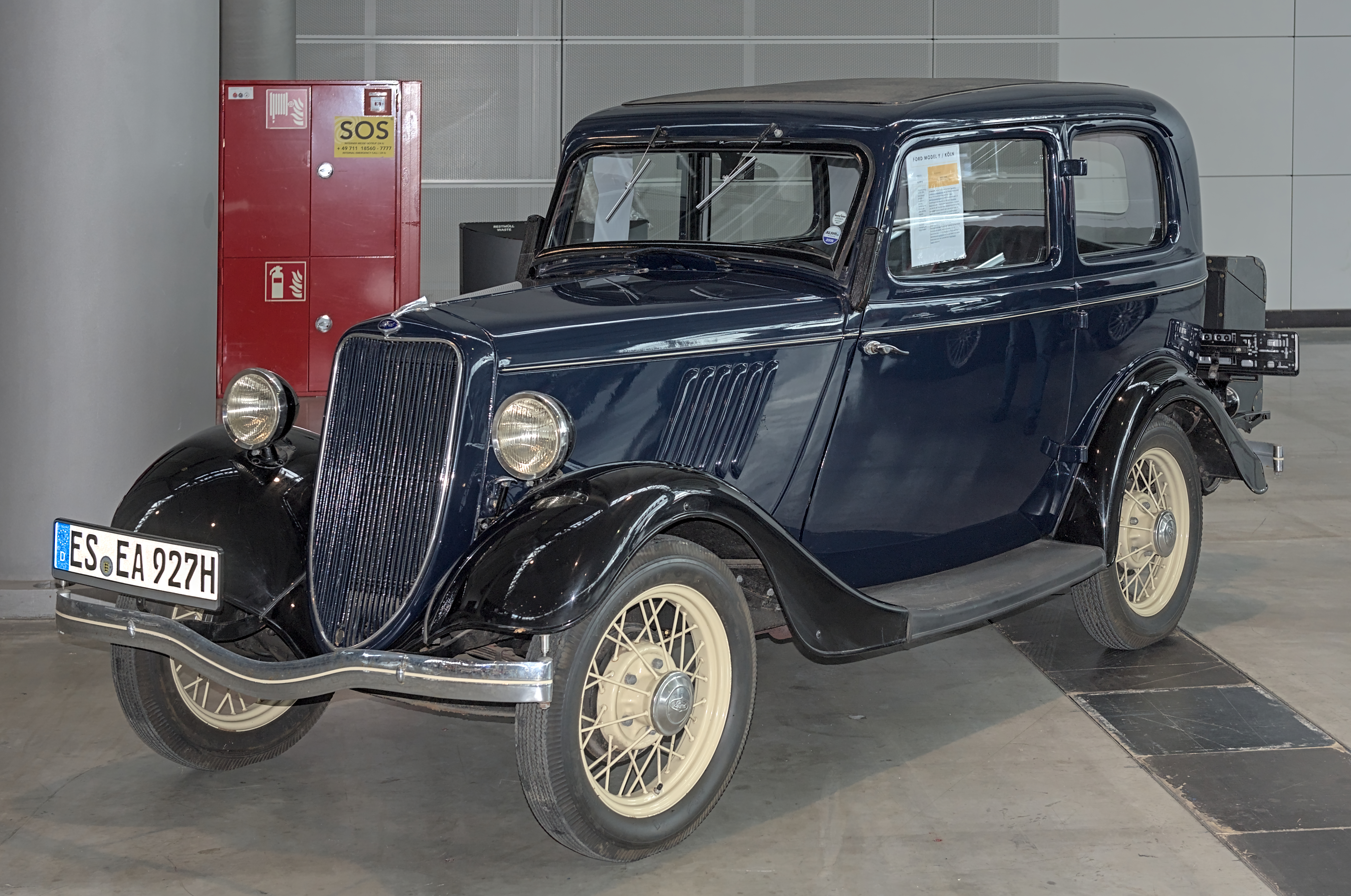

Overview
- Manufacturer: Ford Germany
- Also called: Ford 4/21 (reflecting tax horsepower / actual horsepower) (German built) Ford Modell/Model Y
- Production: July 1933–1936; 11,121 built
- Assembly: Germany: Niehl, Cologne

Body and chassis
- Class: Small family car (C)
- Body style: 2-door saloon/sedan Cabrio-limousine (soft top saloon/sedan) bare-chassis also offered
- Layout: FR layout
- Related: Ford Model Y 1932 Ford

Powertrain
- Engine: 921 cc side-valve 4-cylinder 4-stroke
- Transmission: 3-speed manual with synchromesh on top two ratios

Dimensions
- Wheelbase: 2,286 mm (90.0 in)
- Length: 3,630 mm (143 in)
- Width: 1,370 mm (54 in)
- Height: 1,630 mm (64 in)

Chronology
- Successor: Ford Eifel

The Ford Köln is an automobile that was produced by Ford Germany from 1933 until 1936 at its Cologne plant.

== Origins ==
The English Ford company developed the car and introduced it in 1932 as the Ford Model Y. The German-built version, renamed Ford Köln to stress the vehicle's German provenance, was first seen at the 1933 Berlin Motor Show. The name came from the German name for the city of Cologne. The early cars were built with components and other support from the company's English associate, but during the first year of production componentry was increasingly sourced locally.

== Evolution ==
Subsequently, the German company offered alternative bodied cars of its own design, including for 1934/35, a cheap open topped "Cabrio-Limousine" that used timber-frame construction with synthetic leather covering after the manner of some of the smaller DKWs and Adlers. This bargain basement special was promoted as a "car for everyman" ("Wagen für Jedermann") and priced in 1935 at 1,850 Marks, which was 360 Marks less than the manufacturer's advertised price for the normally bodied two-door sedan/saloon.

== Technical specification ==
The Köln had a four-cylinder, four-stroke engine of 933 cc giving 21 hp (16 kW) at 3400 rpm. The top speed was 85 km/h (53 mph). It had a three-speed gearbox (plus reverse) with synchromesh on second and third gear. It was a small car weighing, in bare chassis form, only 540 kg (1,190 lb): an empty car with a body fitted weighed between 700 kg (1,543 lb) and 750 kg (1,653 lb).

== Commercial ==
Public response to the car was indifferent due to a rigid axle based front suspension and a perpendicular body style which was by now perceived as old fashioned. In its class, the car faced heavy competition, mainly from Opel, DKW and Adler: commercially the Ford Köln, with 11,121 cars produced between 1933 and 1936, was not a great success. Adler produced 24,013 of their similarly sized Trumpf Juniors in less than two years between 1934 and 1935. Ford Köln volumes were also disappointing when compared with the 153,117 produced by Ford of Britain of the equivalent model.

In 1935, the Ford Köln was replaced by the Ford Eifel which was a larger car (based on the British Model C).
