= Ford Taunus P2 =

Ford Taunus 17M
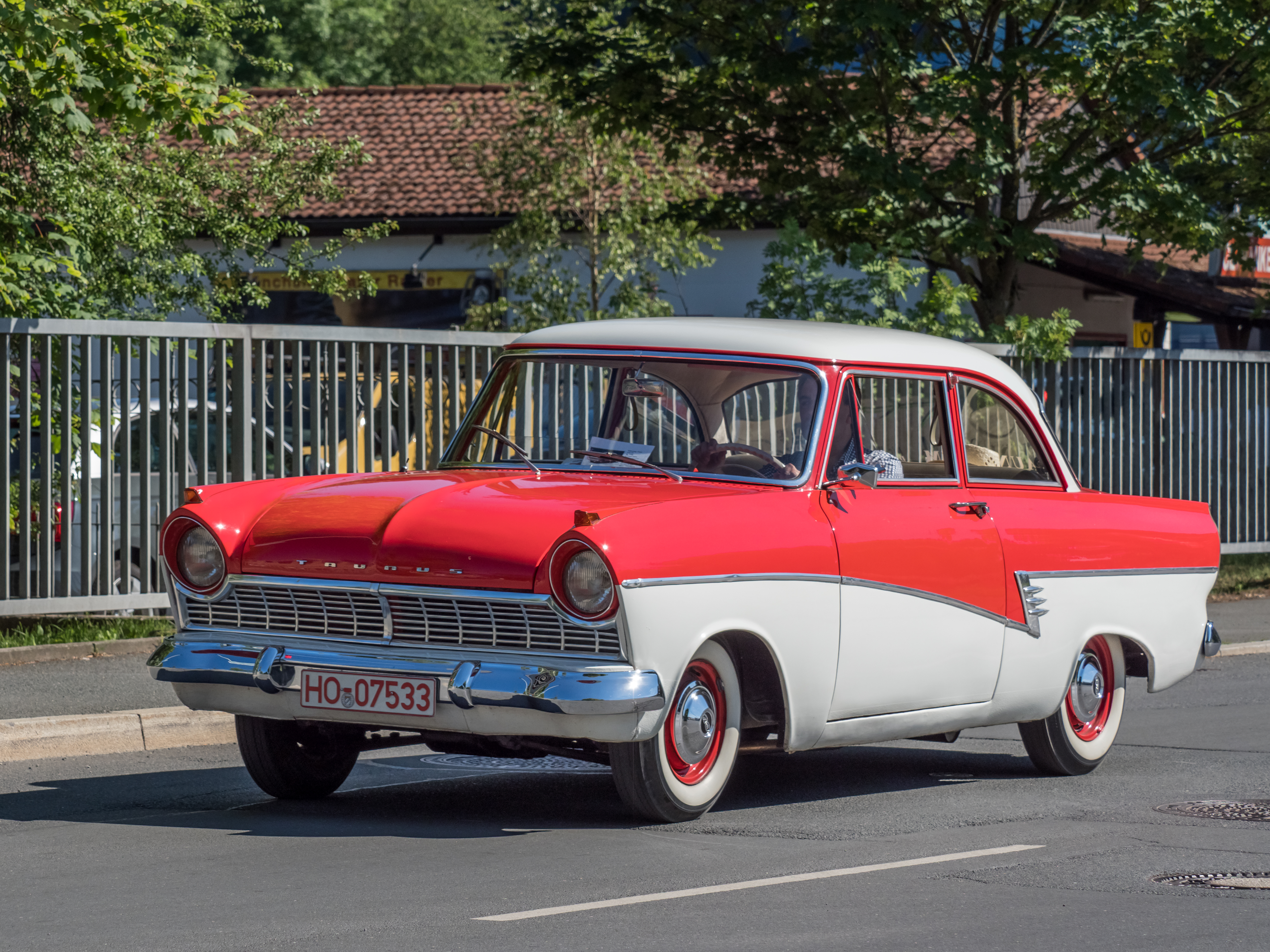

Overview
- Manufacturer: Ford Germany
- Also called: Ford Taunus P2 "“Barocktaunus “ (Baroque Taunus) ""Fliegender Teppich""(Flying carpet)
- Production: 1957–1960
- Assembly: Germany: Cologne-Niehl

Body and chassis
- Class: Executive car (E)
- Body style: 2- or 4-door saloon 3-door “Kombi” estate car 2-door coach-built (Karl Deutsch) cabriolet

Powertrain
- Engine: 1698 cc 4-cylinder in-line, OHV water-cooled
- Transmission: 3-speed manual

Dimensions
- Wheelbase: 2,604 mm (102.5 in)
- Length: 4,375 mm (172.2 in)
- Width: 1,670 mm (65.7 in)
- Height: 1,500 mm (59.1 in)
- Kerb weight: 1,010–1,110 kg (2,227–2,447 lb)

Chronology
- Predecessor: No direct predecessor
- Successor: Ford Taunus 17M P3

The Ford Taunus 17M is a mid-sized family saloon that was produced by Ford Germany between August 1957 and August 1960. The Taunus 17M name was also applied to subsequent Ford models which is why the car is usually identified, in retrospect, as the Ford Taunus P2. It was the second newly designed German Ford to be launched after the war and for this reason it was from inception known within the company as Ford Project 2 (P2) or the Ford Taunus P2.

Because of its unusually flamboyant styling the first 17M also acquired various descriptive soubriquets of which "Barocktaunus“ is probably, today, the most widely used.

During a three-year production run 239,978 Taunus P2s were manufactured.

== Development and launch ==
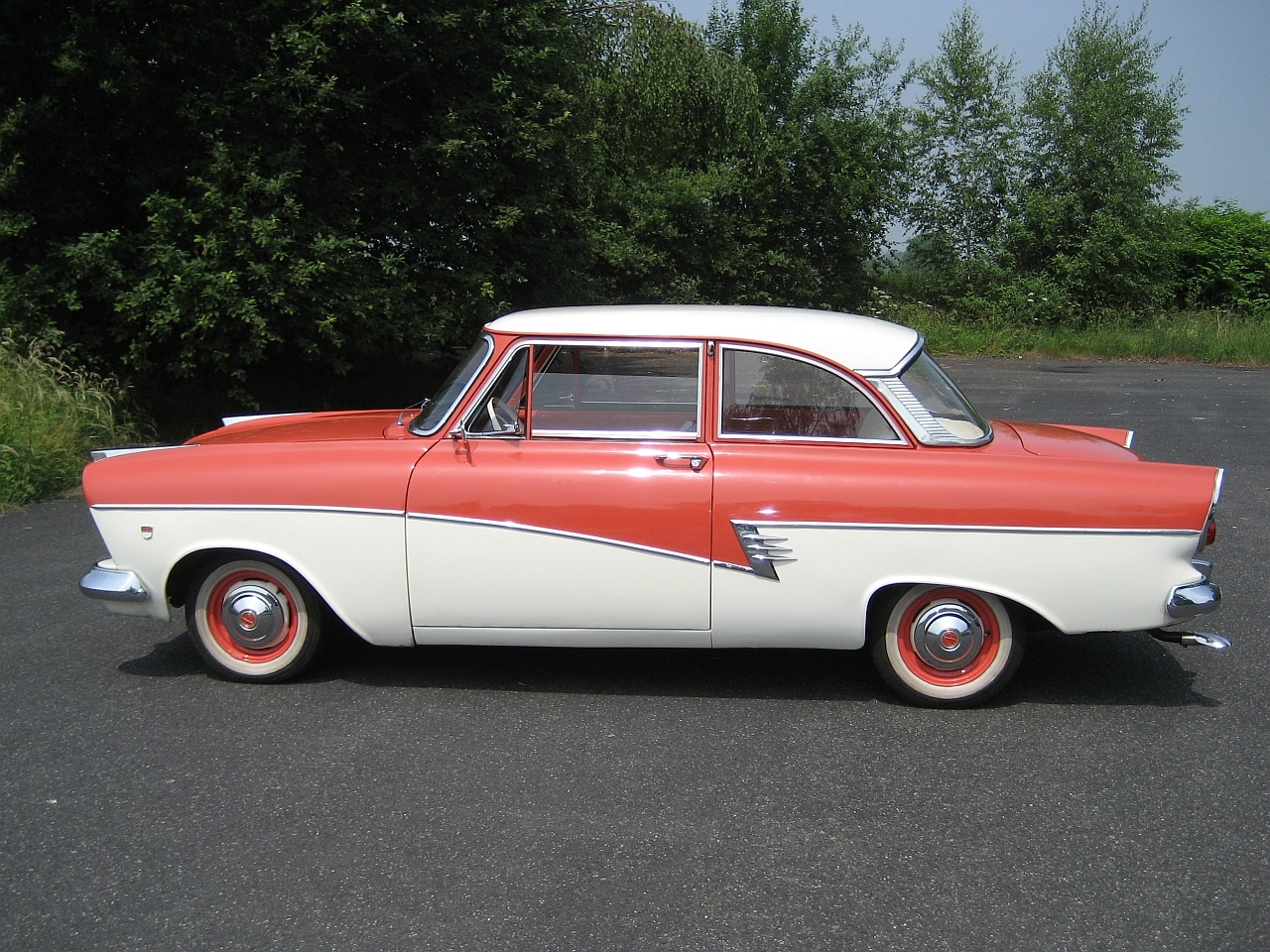
Side view

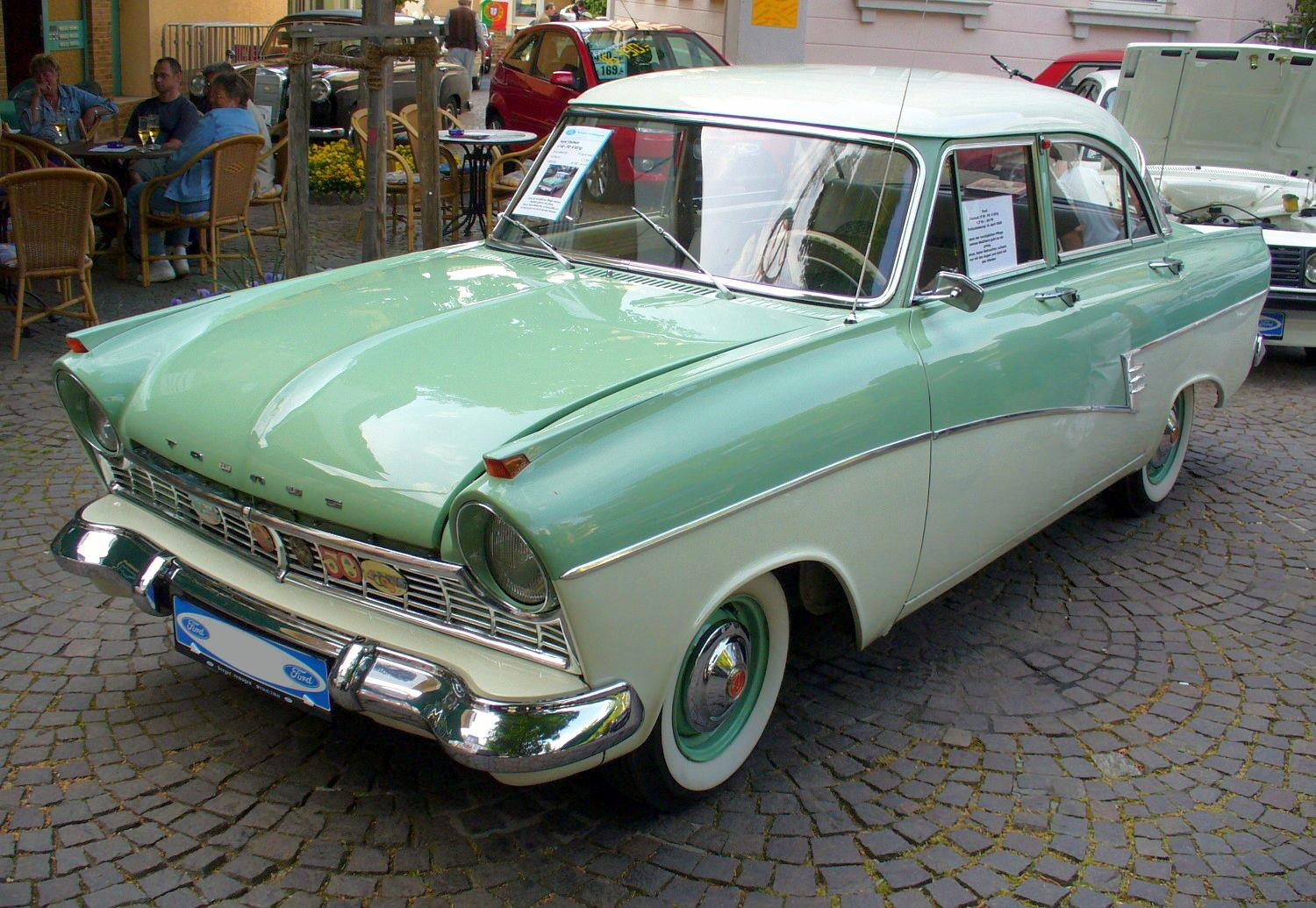
Front 3/4 view

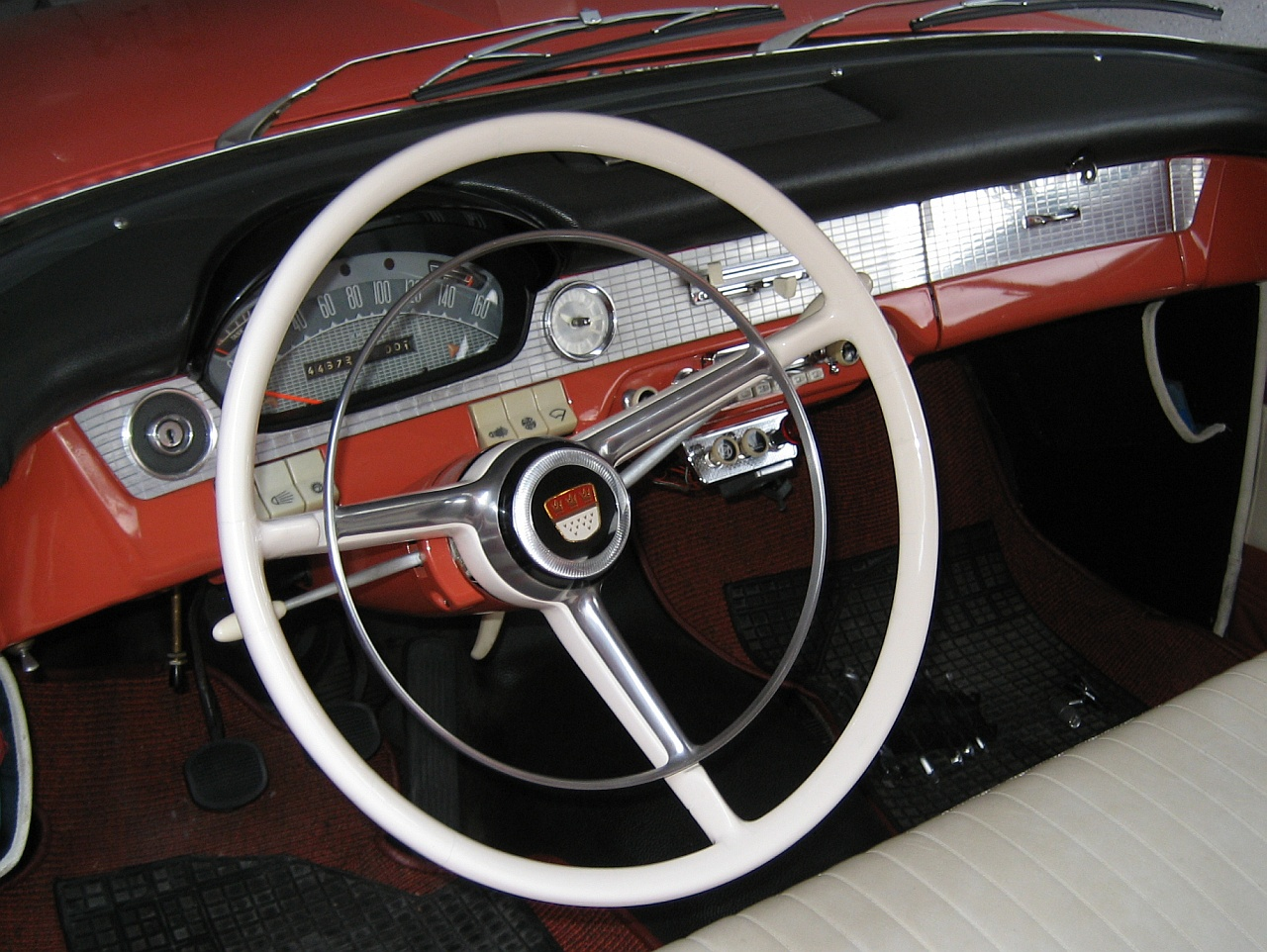
Dash on the deluxe

The early sketches for Ford's new middle class saloon date from early in 1955. Originally it was intended that the car be powered by the 1498 cc ohv engine installed in the Taunus 15M which went on sale in the same year. The design for the body quickly grew too large and heavy for the 55 PS (40 kW; 54 hp) 1498 cc unit, however, and so the company developed a bored out 1698 cc version of the engine, now producing 60 PS (44 kW; 59 hp).

At the end of the summer of 1957, the car was launched at an upmarket Cologne restaurant by the singing star Gitta Lind. Lind's Schlager style of singing was not one with wide appeal in most of the US or the UK, where she may be chiefly noteworthy as a great niece of Beethoven’s piano teacher. The singer’s own compositional talent was on display with the song she wrote for the occasion which was entitled "Fahren auch Sie den neuen Taunus 17M" ("You too [should] drive the new Taunus 17M"). The next month the Ford Taunus 17M itself appeared as one of the stars at the Frankfurt Motor Show.

=== Fashion statements ===
In addition to the relatively mild "baroque" insult, Ford's new middle-weight quickly gained other informal names including "Gelsenkirchener Barock" and "Fliegender Teppich" (Flying carpet). Gelsenkirchener Baroque, a term frequently applied to the Taunus P2 in press reviews, was a style more generally associated with heavy furniture in the newly confident German empire during the closing decades of the nineteenth century. The style, which contrasted with the uncompromised functionalism more usually associated with German design in recent decades, enjoyed a brief revival in the 1950s. Competitor automakers at this time also emulated US styling cues, using large amounts of chrome on the body work and incorporating exaggerated fins, but in 1957 it was nevertheless hard to find any Borgward or Opel decorated with more chrome, nor featuring longer or larger tail fins than the Ford Taunus P2. The sharp “markers” atop the four wings of the car did nevertheless confer a practical benefit by making it very easy to determine, from the driver's seat, precisely where the car ended. The forward ones also positioned the turn signals high and in a spot where they could be seen through more than 180 degrees.

For buyers who found a standard Ford Taunus 17M unacceptably restrained, Ford offered the Taunus 17M deluxe: this provided a two tone paint finish, an interior enhanced with Brocade coverings, an exceptionally stylish steering wheel, a tachometer shaped like a kidney, and even more chrome on the outside of the body. More than fifty years later the Taunus P2 has become very rare, and surviving examples tend to be of these deluxe versions.

The “Flying carpet” soubriquet seems to have been the response of a keen drivers to the company's attempts to give the car the ride and handling characteristics commensurate with its bodywork, modelled on the North American boulevard cruisers of the day, set up for a country associated with straighter, wider and more even roads than those commonly encountered in Europe then or indeed now. The car was mostly inspired from the 1955 Ford, especially the Deluxe version that had the same styling as the American counterpart.

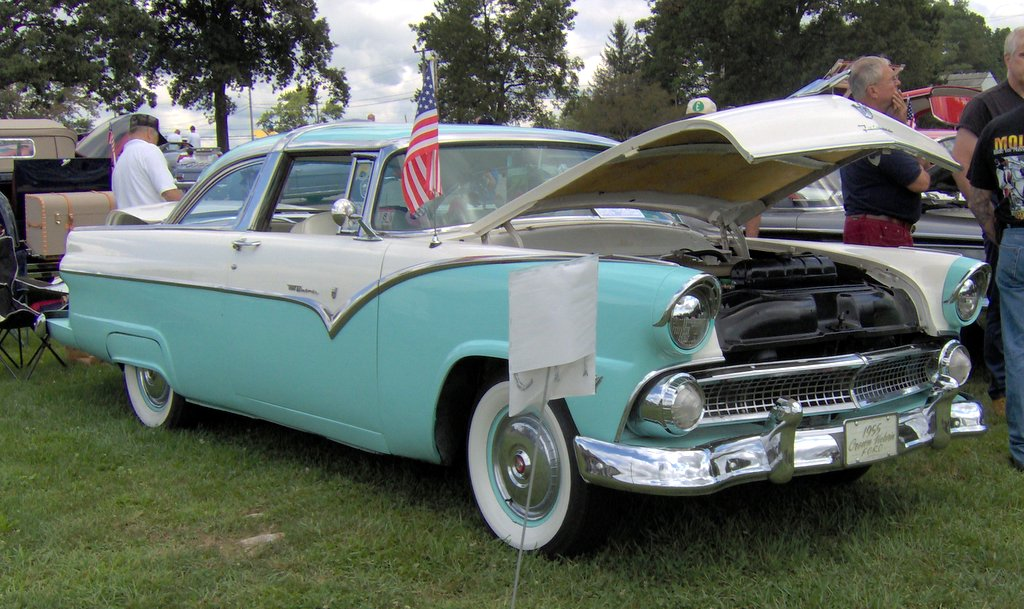
1955 Ford Fairlane Crown Victoria (USA)

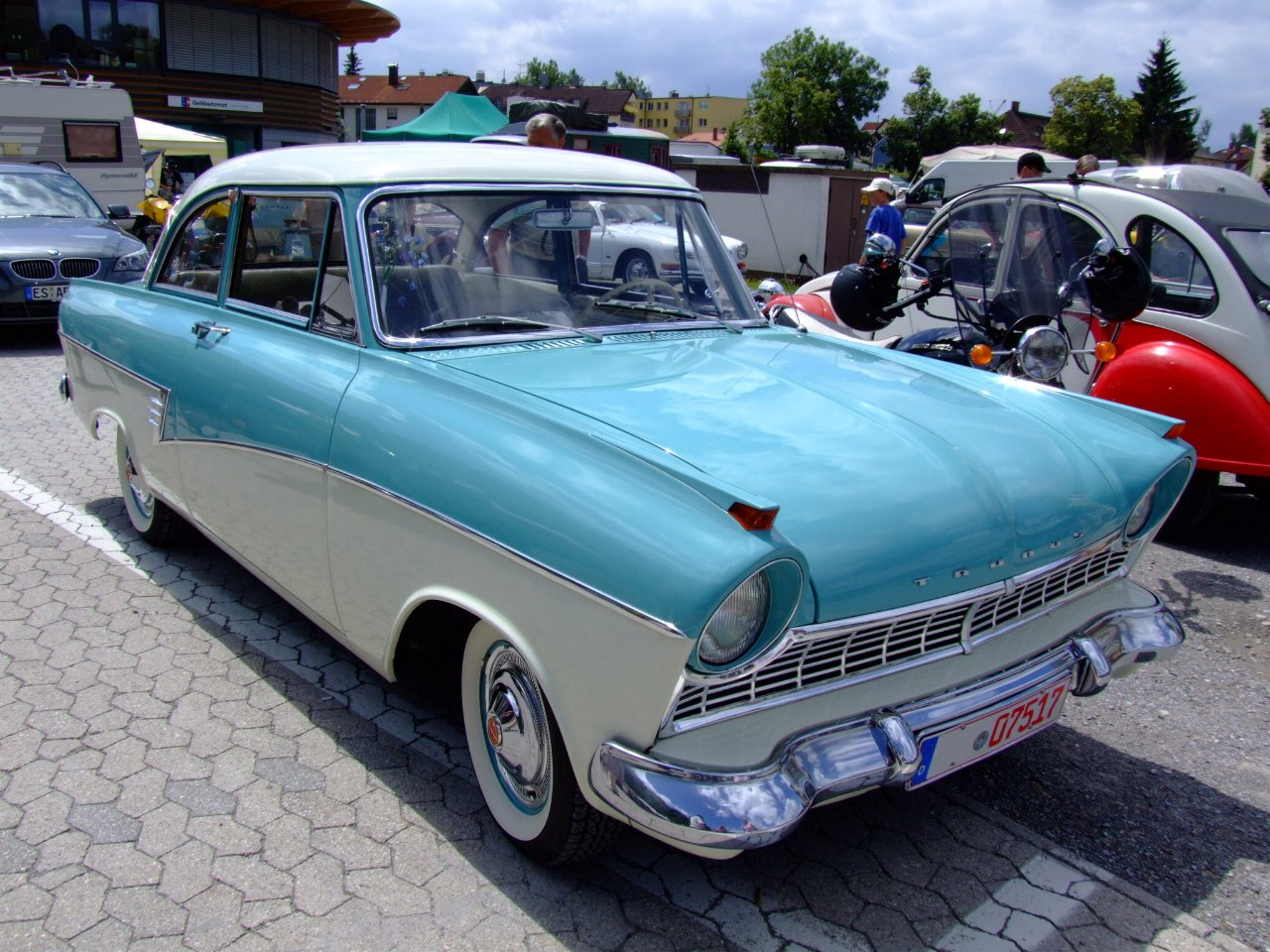
1957 Ford Taunus P2 (Europe)

The comparisation between the 1955 Ford (USA) and the 1957 Ford P2 (Europe)

=== The French connection and the front suspension ===
The Taunus P2 seems to have been developed in close collaboration with Ford of France, and it closely resembled that company's Vedette model which itself emerged with enlarged tailfins in 1957. However, in 1954 Ford had sold a majority holding in its strike prone French operation to Simca, and although Ford retained a minority shareholding in the Simca business until 1958, the P2's French cousin, despite having been developed when the business was under Ford control, was in most markets badged as a Simca.

The Vedette had pioneered an independent front suspension system that involved incorporating an oil filled shock absorber within a spring in a manner intended to dampen the excessively rapid vertical movement of a simple steel spring. The resulting unit later became known as a MacPherson strut, and starting in 1951 with the British Ford Consul, Ford would fit them to many mainstream models produced by their German and British factories. The 1957 Taunus P2 was the first car from Ford Germany to feature a front end suspension configuration using MacPherson struts. The MacPherson strut arrangement would become known for combining good road holding and passenger comfort for a relatively low cost, but the shock settings on the Baroque Taunus nevertheless must have contributed to its informally awarded “Flying carpet” title

=== Bodies ===
The P2 came as a two- or four-door saloon. A three-door estate car was also offered together with a van, which was in effect an estate car with the side windows to the rear of the b-pillars replaced by steel panelling. The deluxe version was denoted with the letter “L” while the letters “CL” were reserved for a two-door cabriolet which was the result of a conversion performed by the traditional Cologne coachbuilders Karl Deutsch GmbH.

In retrospect the inclusion of a four-door saloon in the range seems unsurprising. However, the West German market, in contrast to the French and British markets, still had more of an appetite for two-door models in this category. The Borgward Isabella of the time was never offered with more than two doors, and the two-door Taunus 17Ms of the period seem to have comfortably outsold the four-door versions.

=== 1959 facelift ===
After the annual summer shut down in 1959 the Taunus P2 received a minor facelift in time for the 1960 model year which would be its final year of production. The roof line was flattened, reducing the height of the car by 3 cm (more than an inch). The chrome decorations on the car's body were rearranged. One of the results of that was that the basic model now flaunted the same front grille as the de Luxe model. On a more practical note, buyers paying extra for the four-speed transmission now enjoyed synchromesh on all four forward gears. Under the bonnet/hood September 1959 saw the introduction of a redesigned cylinder head and a slight increase in the compression ratio. There was no change in the listed power output or top speed resulting from this, but there was a 5% reduction in fuel consumption.

Ford Taunus 17M (P2) production (units):

- 1957 16,520
- 1958 81,133
- 1959 77,508
- 1960 61,372

Most of the cars produced were saloons, but the total of 239,978 also included 45,468 estate/kombi bodied cars and (evidently not included in these data) more than 3,000 cabriolets, converted from saloons by the Cologne based coachbuilder Karl Deutsch.

=== 1960 replacement ===
In 1960 the Baroque Taunus was replaced with the Bathtub Taunus (Badewanne). The application of affectionately disrespectful names to Ford’s German models seems by now to have become a habit for the German press. In terms of the company’s own nomenclatures 1960 was the year that the Ford Taunus P2 was replaced by the Ford Taunus P3.

=== Commercial ===
Between 1957 and 1960 Ford produced 239,978 Taunus P2s. 45,468 of these were estate cars. This provided a welcome boost to the company’s domestic market share at a time when its only other mainstream model, the Ford Taunus P1 was lagging badly in the marketplace.

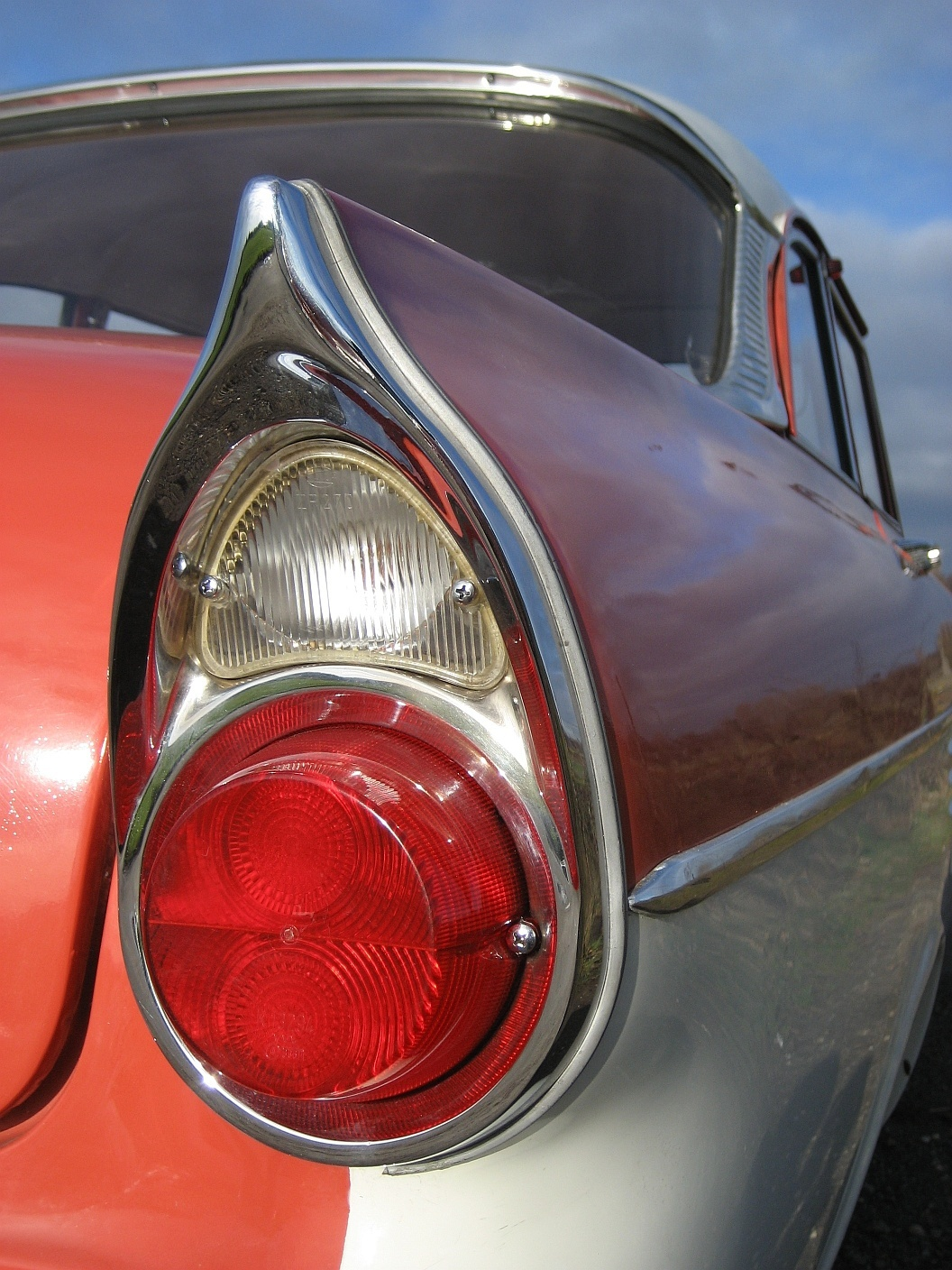

However, during the same three-year period Opel produced 817,003 of their Opel Olympia Rekord model which competed in almost the same class. Coming second to General Motors in the high volume market segments in West Germany (which would soon be Europe’s largest national auto-market) became a habit that Ford would find hard to break in the ensuring decades.

=== Reputation ===
Around the time the Taunus P2 was replaced by the Taunus P3 tail fins abruptly fell out of fashion even in the USA, which was generally seen as the country that had invented them. The Baroque Taunus had attracted adverse comment for its overly-ornate styling even while in production, and the modern clean design shaped for the P3 by Ford’s new styling guru, Uwe Bahnsen, invited unfavourable comparisons between the old and the new models. Second-hand values for the P2 were never strong, and this combined with inadequate rust protection to ensure that few survived for long enough to acquire "oldtimer status".

Fifty years later, the car’s rarity and its 1950s style generate more positive reactions, at least among enthusiasts who are prepared to overcome the acute shortage of ready made replacement parts for the car.
