= Fairlite =

Overview
- Type: Kit car
- Manufacturer: Walklett Bros.
- Production: 1958-1962
- Model years: 1958-1963

Body and chassis
- Body style: Convertible
- Layout: FR layout
- Related: Ford 8 and 10 HP

Powertrain
- Engine: 1,172 cc (71.5 cu in; 1.172 L) Ford Sidevalve I4
- Transmission: 3 and 4-speed Manual

Dimensions
- Wheelbase: 7.5 ft (2,286 mm)
- Length: 3,500 mm (137.8 in)
- Width: 1,660 mm (65.4 in)
- Height: 1,322 mm (52.0 in)
- Curb weight: 980 lb (445 kg)

The Fairlite was a kit car built by the Walklett Brothers, who were also behind Ginetta Cars, meant to be installed on the chassis of the Ford 8 and 10 HP. The Fairlite was the first full fiberglass design developed by the Walklett Brothers, in response to a drying up of sales of "specials" in favor of the booming kit car market. The car was originally built as a Kit car based on the Ford 8 and 10 HP 7.5 ft (2.3 m) wheelbase, but the body could be fit to many other chassis such as the Buckler spaceframe. Despite the car selling reasonably well, with 60 being made, the Walklett Brothers did not think the car followed the ethos of what they wanted Ginetta cars to be – it did not handle particularly well, and to be a Ginetta a car had to have an in-house chassis. The Fairlite was therefore never sold under the Ginetta name. The kit cost £49 new.

The car cuts down on the weight of the Ford 8 and 10 HP by 560 lb (254 kg), meaning the acceleration gain is massive, with the Ginetta improving on the Ford 10 HP top speed of 55 mph (89 km/h), up to 71 mph (114 km/h), which means it accelerated to 60 mph (97 km/h), in about 11 seconds, versus the Ford 10 HP which is unable to hit 60 mph (97 km/h).
