= Ford Model C (Europe) =

Car manufactured by Ford

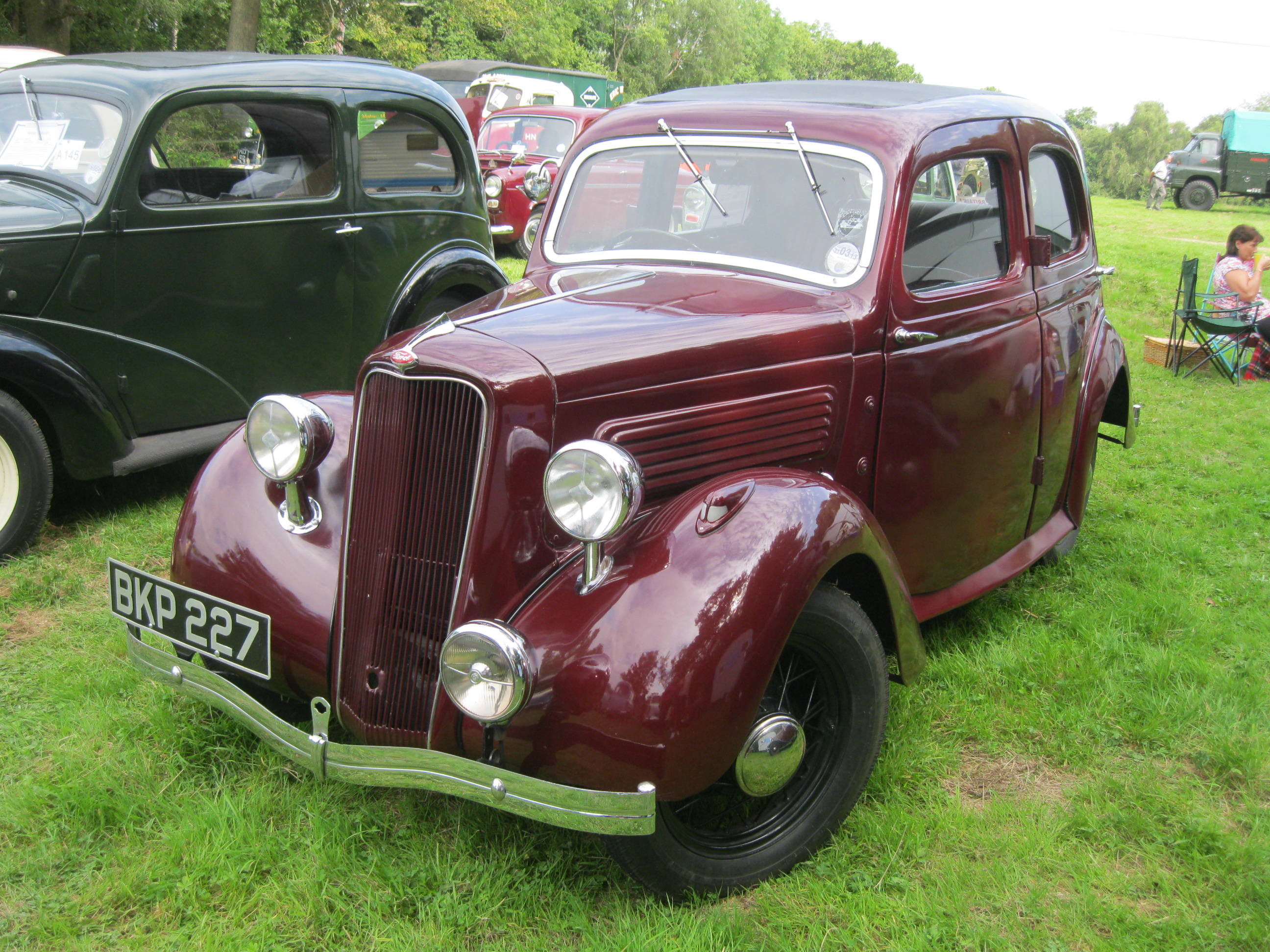
Ford C Ten

The Ford Model C is a car that was produced from 1934 until 1937 by Ford UK in Dagenham. It had an 1,172 cc (71.5 cu in) four-cylinder sidevalve engine delivering 34 hp (25 kW). It was the "big brother" to the smaller Ford Y, which had a 933 cc (56.9 cu in) engine. The styling was inspired by the 1934 Ford V8, only smaller. The Model C was also built by Ford Germany, where it was named the Ford Eifel after the mountain range near Cologne, and it was sold from 1934 to 1940.

The British line was named Ten (for 10 British fiscal horsepower).

In 1935, the grille and bonnet on the British line was facelifted and the mark was changed to CX.

In 1937, the body was upgraded again and the design of the British and German product lines became more different. The German line was still named Eifel. The British equivalent was named the Model 7W.
