= Niehl, Cologne =

Niehl
- Stadtteil of Cologne
- Location within Nippes
- Interactive map of Niehl
- Location within Germany Location within North Rhine-Westphalia
- Coordinates: 50°59′22″N 06°57′41″E
- Country: Germany
- State: North Rhine-Westphalia
- Admin. region: Cologne
- District: Urban district
- City: Cologne
- Borough: Nippes

Area
  - Total: 12.06 km^{2} (4.66 sq mi)

Population (2020-12-31)
  - Total: 20,036
  - Density: 1,661/km^{2} (4,303/sq mi)
- Time zone: UTC+01:00 (CET)
  - Summer (DST): UTC+02:00 (CEST)
- Website: Stadt Köln

Niehl (German pronunciation: [niːl]) is a Stadtteil (quarter) of the city of Cologne, Germany. Situated north of the city centre, on the left bank of the Rhine, it is part of the district of Nippes.

The largest employer in Cologne is Ford Europe, which has its European headquarters and the factory Cologne Body & Assembly in Niehl (Ford-Werke GmbH).
