= Ford Taunus P3 =

Ford Taunus 17M
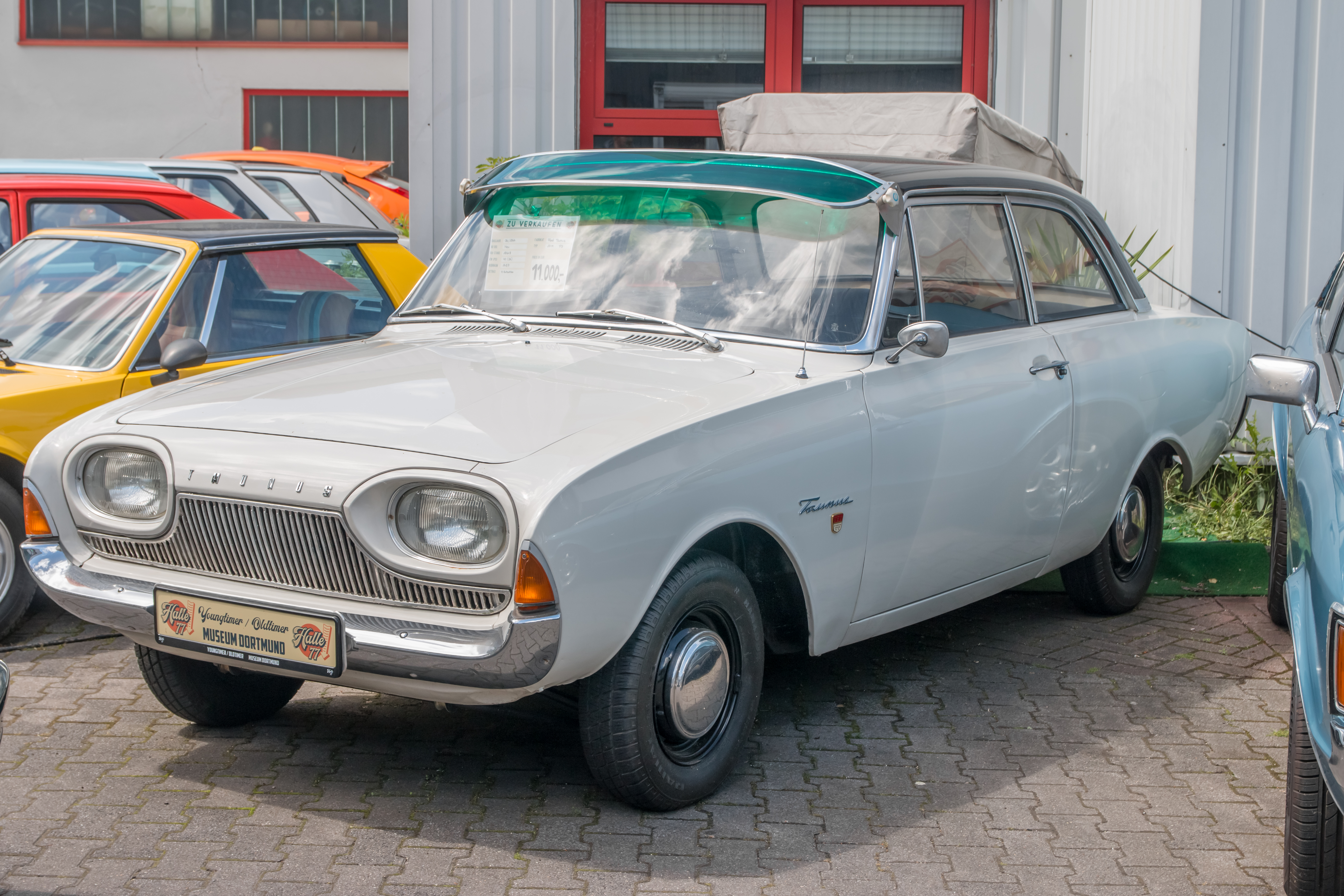

Overview
- Manufacturer: Ford Germany
- Also called: Ford Taunus P3 "Badewannetaunus " (Bathtub Taunus)
- Production: September 1960 – August 1964
- Assembly: Germany: Cologne-Niehl; Rhodesia: Salisbury; South Africa: Port Elizabeth (FMCSA)

Body and chassis
- Class: Executive car (E)
- Body style: 2- or 4-door saloon 3-door "Kombi" estate car 2-door coach-built (Karl Deutsch) cabriolet

Powertrain
- Engine: Taunus I4: 1498 cc 4-cylinder inline water-cooled, overhead-valve 1698 cc 4-cylinder inline water-cooled, overhead-valve 1758 cc 4-cylinder inline water-cooled, overhead-valve
- Transmission: 3- or 4-speed manual 3-speed "Saxomat" automatic (optional)

Dimensions
- Wheelbase: 2,630 mm (103.5 in)
- Length: 4,452 mm (175.3 in); 4,517 mm (177.8 in) (turnier/estate)
- Width: 1,670 mm (65.7 in)
- Height: 1,450 mm (57.1 in) or 1,490 mm (58.7 in)
- Kerb weight: 940–1,015 kg (2,072–2,238 lb)

Chronology
- Predecessor: Ford Taunus 17M P2
- Successor: Ford Taunus 17M P5

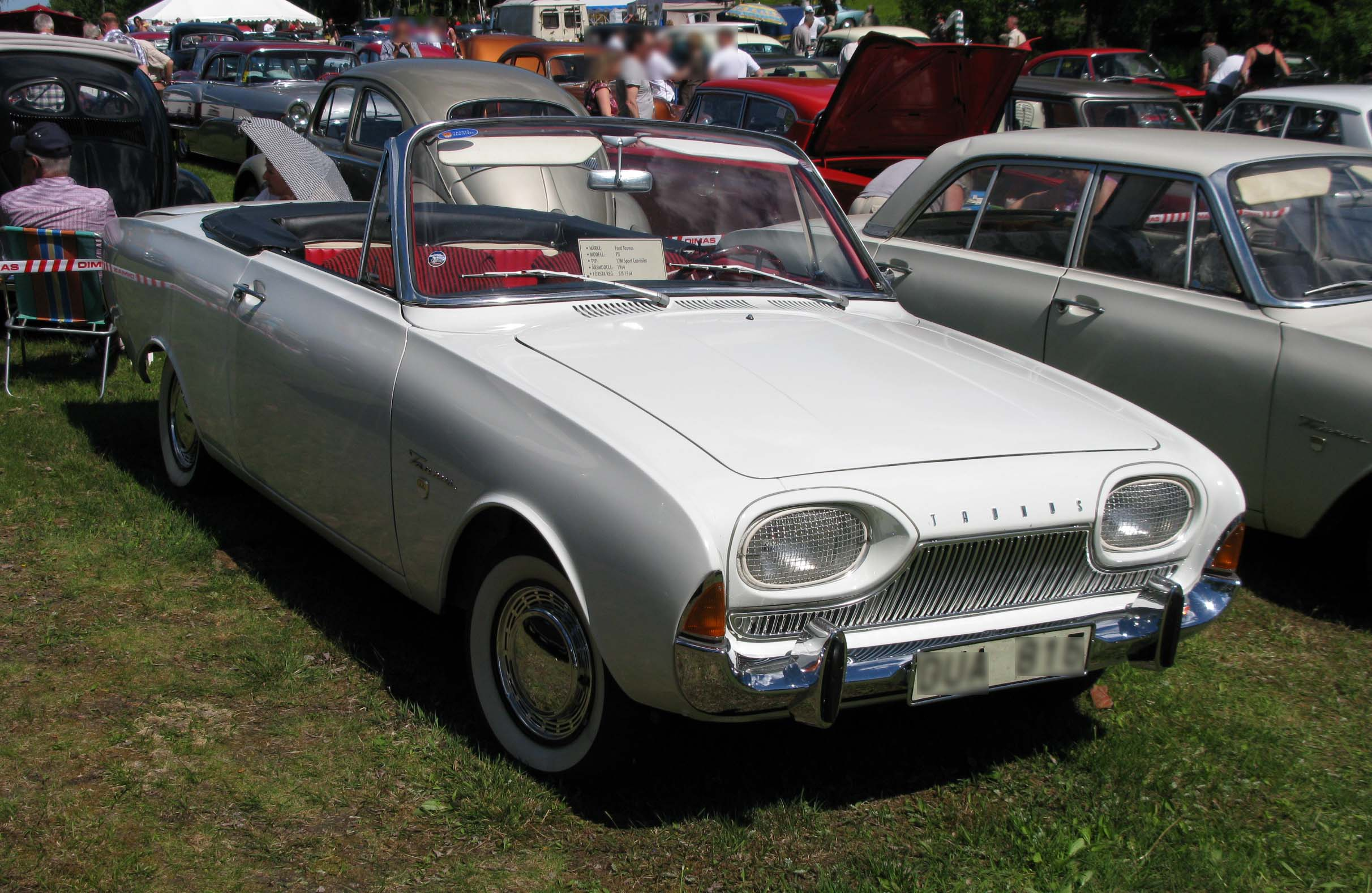
The coachbuilt cabriolet, converted by Karl Deutsch of Cologne was always rare.

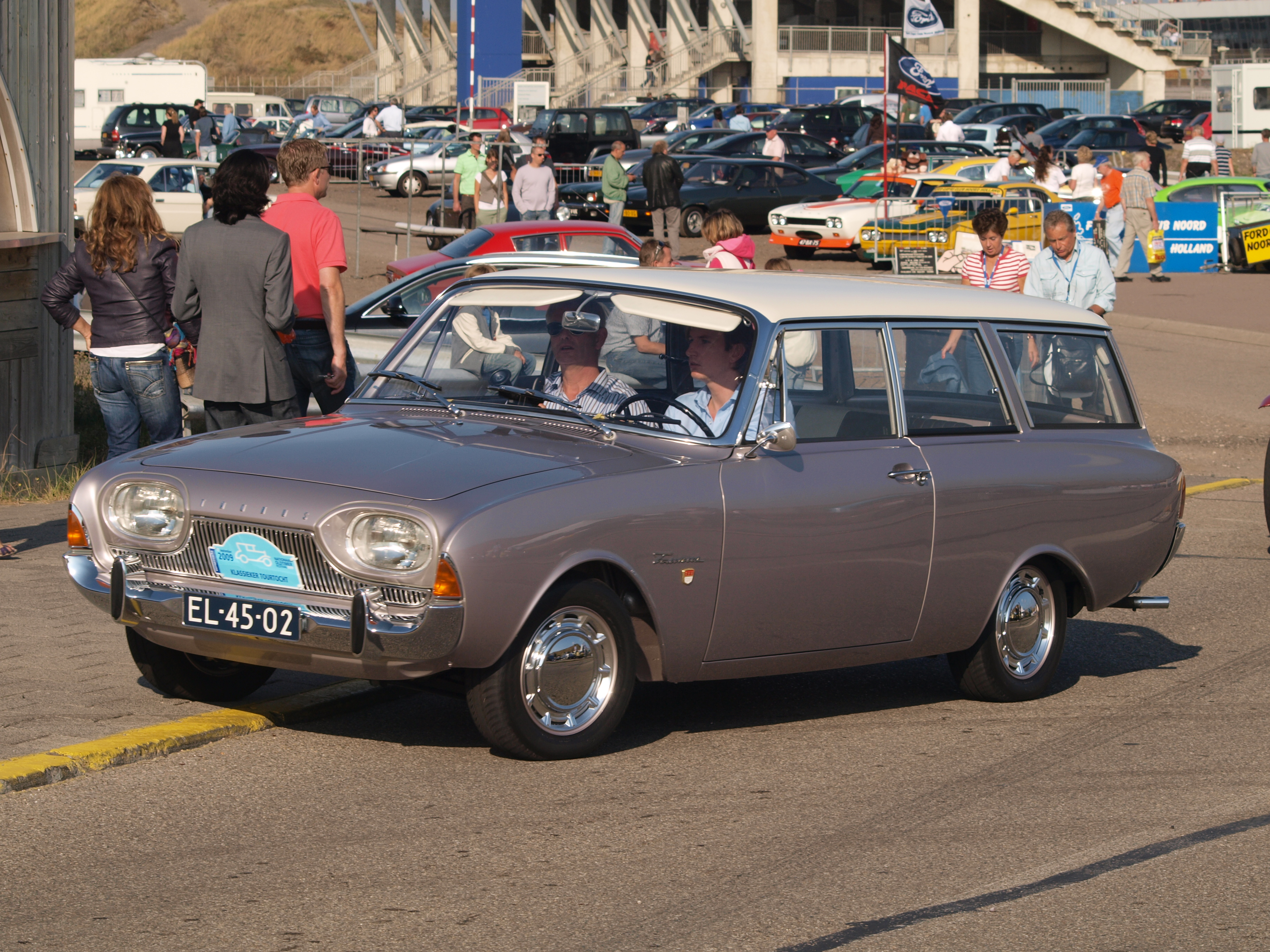
The three door estate car was badged as the Ford Taunus 17M Turnier.

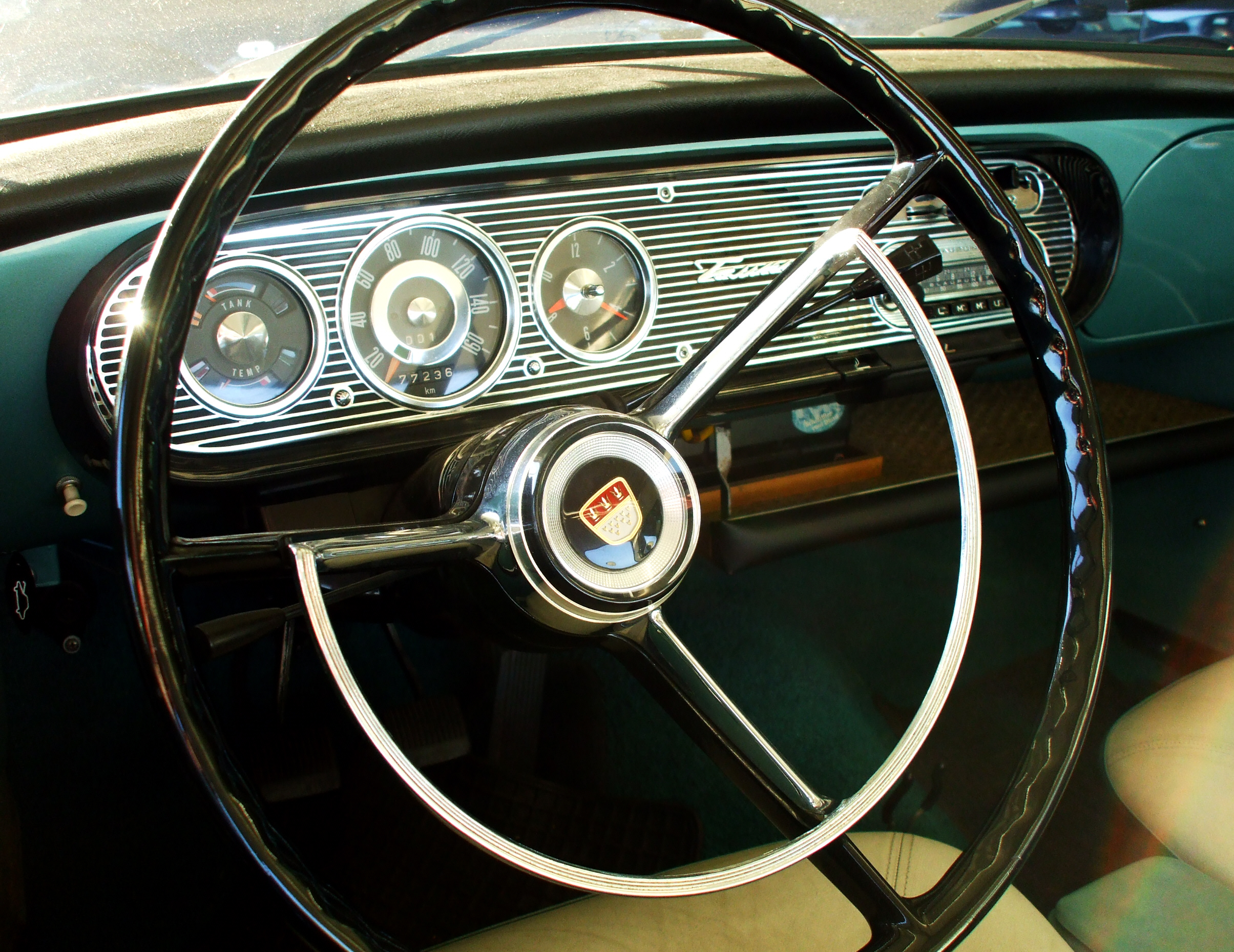
The instrument panel ahead of the driver and the radio both carried over the shape of an extended lozenge which dominated the shape of the car when viewed from outside.

The Ford Taunus 17 M is a middle sized family saloon that was produced by Ford Germany between September 1960 and August 1964. The Taunus 17M name had been applied to the car's predecessor and it would apply also to subsequent Ford models which is why the 17M introduced in 1960 is usually identified, in retrospect, as the Ford Taunus P3. It was the third newly designed German Ford to be launched after the war and for this reason it was from inception known within the company as Ford Project 3 (P3) or the Ford Taunus P3.

Members of the press had apparently competed to find a suitably disrespectful epithet to describe the controversially styled first Taunus 17M, and it was in the same tradition that the new 17M for 1960 became known as the "Badewannetaunus" (Bath tub Taunus).

The Ford Taunus P3 was a commercial success 669,731 were produced during a four-year production run, giving an annualised rate more than twice that achieved by the predecessor model during its three years in production.

== High profile launch ==
The car received its public launch at the Beethoven Hall in Bonn. Unusually for a car launch, both the by now 84-year-old German chancellor, Konrad Adenauer, and the grandson of the firm's founder, Henry Ford, were present. In addition to the latest Ford Taunus, they were celebrating the thirtieth anniversary of Ford's Cologne plant. It had been on 2 October 1930 that Henry Ford and the then mayor of nearby Cologne, Konrad Adenauer, had laid the foundation stone for the Cologne Ford Plant.

== European design ==
The first post-war Taunus models had been designed in North America. The Taunus P3 was designed by Uwe Bahnsen, a German born designer who would dominate car design at Ford of Germany for nearly thirty years and whose subsequent designs included the 1969 Ford Capri and its successors. Towards the end of his time in charge of design with Ford of Germany, Bahnsen also led the teams that designed the Fords Sierra and Scorpio. In the context of 1960 the Taunus P3 can nevertheless be seen as Bahnsen's most innovative design for a production car.

The 1960 Taunus design featured a recurring geometrical shape. The rear panel and the side panels respected the same basic shape as did the front grille, subject to two large cutouts for the headlights.

The same shape was carried over to the interior of the car where the main dials and controls on the dashboard were surrounded by a thick frame in that oval shape. The repetitious use of a single simple shape at different levels of the design gave the overall car a consistent visual unity which was in stark contrast to the high finned flamboyance of the previous Taunus 17M and was seen at the time as a radical switch by Ford of Germany away from American styling in favour of European styling. There were no tails fins and there was very little decorative chrome included. The efficiency of its superficially much more simple design enabled Ford to boast that the 1960 car, despite being fractionally narrowed on the outside, offered usefully more interior width than the car it replaced.

== Technical Innovation ==
The P3 and the 1961 Citroën Ami were the first cars with rectangular or lozenge-shaped headlamps. This technical innovation was developed by lighting manufacturers Hella (Taunus) and Cibie (Ami). At the time, it was an unquestioned article of faith that headlights were round, and in the United States, it was the law, so these new headlights were illegal there. Ten years later this had inspired European automakers to come up with various non-round headlamp shapes, though many had by 1970 settled on a standardised shared rectangular shape.

== Body ==
Most of the cars were sold as two- or four-door saloons. A three-door "Turnier" estate was also available. The confident determination of the car's designers’ to celebrate the new decade with something new and different was reflected in the unusual positioning of the rear lights on the early estate cars, on the leading edge at the back of the roof of the car, as two red horizontal units lined up directly above the tailgate. Later P3 Turniers had their rear lights more conventionally positioned.

The P3 also followed the tradition of its predecessor in that coach built two-door cabriolets and coupes were offered, converted by a traditional Cologne based body builder called Karl Deutsch. However, these special bodied cars appear to have been relatively expensive, and only about 150 were produced.

The cars were offered with an unusually broad choice of color and interior trim options.

The early 1960s were a period of rapid expansion for the west European auto-industry, and export markets for the new 17M included Greece and Australia where several cars were converted locally into "pickups" or, in Australian English, "utes". The 17M was also assembled in South Africa and Southern Rhodesia in right hand drive.

== Engine and running gear ==
The cars were all branded as Ford Taunus 17Ms which might have led observers who thought they had understood Ford Germany's naming conventions to conclude that the cars all came with 1.7 litre engines. In fact, there were three different engine sizes offered, being the 1498 cc unit first seen in the Taunus 15M of 1954, the 1698 cc unit originally introduced in 1957 to cope with the weight of the first Ford Taunus 17M and, from September 1961, a new larger 1757 cc engine. Power outputs initially ranged from 55 PS (40 kW; 54 hp) to 60 PS (44 kW; 59 hp), and these engine versions remained available throughout the model's four-year life, but several more powerful engines featuring raised compression ratios in response to the increased availability of higher octane fuels appeared during the four-year period: by 1964 the most powerful Ford 17M offered 75 PS (55 kW; 74 hp). In Sweden, the more powerful version first available in 1962 was sold as the "Taunus Sport", with the inclusion of a more lavish interior. Approximately 50% of the cars built were delivered with the smallest of the three engines, the 1498 cc unit.

The engines were all gasoline/petrol powered four-cylinder inline four-stroke water-cooled units.

Changing gear involved a column-mounted gear change, which by now was becoming increasingly mainstream in Germany. It was possible to specify a "Saxomat" automatic clutch with the three-speed transmission: drivers content to accept a fully manual gear change system could also specify a four-speed gear box.

There were several important technical innovations during the four-year model run which no doubt go some way to explain the car's commercial success when compared to that achieved by its predecessor, and will have strengthened the Ford image in a market which had grown used to seeing Ford sales trailing those of General Motors’ Opel business. In April 1962 the 17M became the first mainstream production car in Germany to offer, as an option, disc brakes on the front wheels. Just over a year later front disc brakes became a standard fitting on all models. 1962 was also the year when the car acquired an "automatic starter" which reportedly made the traditional manual choke unnecessary.

== Optional extras ==
Options available at extra cost included velour carpeting, grab handles for the passengers in the back, whitewall tires, a two tone paint finish and even a "make-up mirror" cleverly incorporated into the sun-visor on the passenger's side.

== Advertising ==
The 1960s was a period of rapid expansion in Europe both for the auto-industry and in the world of advertising. Ford tended to be ahead of the field in this aspect of marketing, even if some of the resulting slogans appear stilted fifty years later. The style of new Taunus 17M was advertised as representing a „Linie der Vernunft" which loosely translates as a "rational form" offering an implicit rebuke to the by now unfashionably elaborate styling of the old Taunus 17M. The car was advertised with the balanced and pithy slogan "Zum Fahren geboren. Zum sparen gebaut" (Born to drive. Built to save/economise).

Ford Taunus 17M (P3) production (units):

- 1960 29,944
- 1961 168,430
- 1962 193,378
- 1963 164,646
- 1964 97,658

Most of the cars produced were saloons, but the total of 669,731 also included 86,010 estate/kombi (Taunus 17M Turnier) bodied cars and (evidently not included in these data) approximately 15,000 other vehicles including pickup truck conversions for customers in Greece and South Africa along with cabriolets and coupés, converted from saloons by the Cologne based coachbuilder Karl Deutsch.

Steel bodied estate equivalent models based on mainstream saloons were rapidly gaining in popularity. Giving the Taunus 17M estate a special name, "Turnier", intended to be unique to the Ford brand also showed the Ford marketing department ahead of the German owned competition. The Opel Rekord estate had already been dubbed by Opel a "CarAVan" in 1958, but market leaders Volkswagen would not find their equivalent label until the launch of the Volkswagen 1500 Variant in 1962.

== Commercial ==
The boldly styled and regularly upgraded Taunus P3 was a commercial success. 669,731 were produced. The figure includes 86,010 estates. In the sales statistics for several months of 1961/62 the success of the model even enabled Ford briefly to overtake Opel on the German market, becoming the second best selling auto-brand, beaten to the top spot only by Volkswagen.

The Taunus P3 was replaced by the Ford Taunus P5 which would come with a wider range of engines and which would sell at approximately the same rate. However, the overall market size was growing through the 1960s, and with it grew the sales of the Opel Rekord. After the Taunus P3 no future Taunus model would come close to challenging Opel’s dominance of the large lucrative middle-market portion of the German auto-market.

== Fifty years on ==
The Taunus P3 continues to generate enthusiasm, and most of the surviving vehicles in Germany enjoy the financial privileges and responsibilities available, in Germany, to owners of cars designated and maintained as oldtimers (the term used in Germany for a classic car).

In 2006 484 Taunus P3 saloons were registered in Germany along with 21 "Turnier" estates. There were thought to be fewer than 10 in the USA, a relatively high content of registered and/or roadworthy vehicles in the Scandinavian countries and a handful still survive in other countries (for instance some of the countries in Eastern Europe and Latin America where it was marketed) where statistics are less readily accessible than in Germany.
