= Ford Eifel =

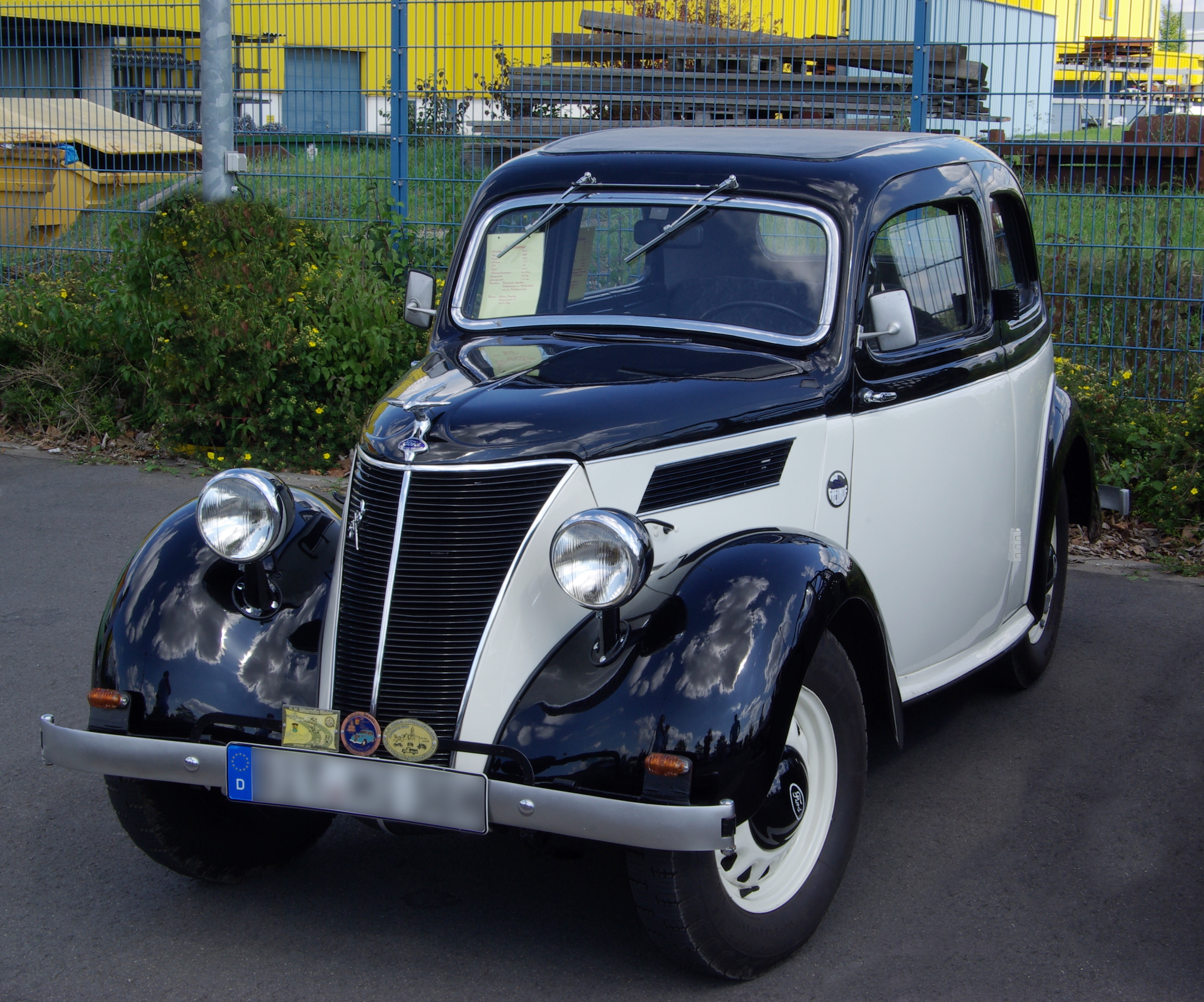

Overview
- Manufacturer: Ford Germany
- Also called: Ford 5/34 (reflecting tax horsepower / actual horsepower)
- Production: July 1935–1940; 62,495 built
- Assembly: Germany: Niehl, Cologne; Denmark: Copenhagen

Body and chassis
- Class: Small family car (C)
- Body style: saloon/sedan, cabrio-limousine (soft top saloon/sedan), cabriolet, roadster
- Layout: FR layout

Powertrain
- Engine: 1172 cc side-valve 4-cylinder 4-stroke
- Transmission: 3-speed manual

Dimensions
- Wheelbase: 2,286 mm (90.0 in)
- Length: 4,000 mm (160 in); 3,850 mm (152 in) (roadster)
- Width: 1,430 mm (56 in)
- Height: 1,600 mm (63 in) (saloon & "cabrio-limousine"); 1,465 mm (57.7 in) (roadster); 1,420 mm (56 in) (cabriolet)

Chronology
- Predecessor: Ford Köln
- Successor: Ford Taunus

The Ford Eifel is a car manufactured by Ford Germany between 1935 and 1940. It initially complemented, and then replaced, the Ford Köln. It was itself replaced by the Ford Taunus.

Between 1937 and 1939, it was also assembled in Hungary and Denmark. The Eifel was derived from the Ford Model C (Europe) 1934 platform, and is also related to the Dagenham-built 1938 Ford Prefect and 1939 Ford Anglia.

The model was named after the Eifel mountain range in western Germany.

== Body ==
The car was offered with many different body types, including a two-door sedan, a two-door cabrio coach, two- and four-seat cabriolet, two-seater roadster, and a light truck. The mainstream "limousine" (saloon) steel bodies were bought in from the Ambi Budd factory in Berlin, while the "cabrio-Limousine" (soft-top saloons/sedans) were built by Drauz coachbuilders of Heilbronn. Several other body builders such as Gläser coachbuilders of Dresden provided the less mainstream bodies.

== Engine and transmission ==
The engine was a four-cylinder, four-stroke, side-valve 1172-cc unit, giving a claimed maximum power output of 34 hp (25 kW) at 4250 rpm. The three-speed manual gearbox featured synchromesh on the top two ratios.

== Commercial ==
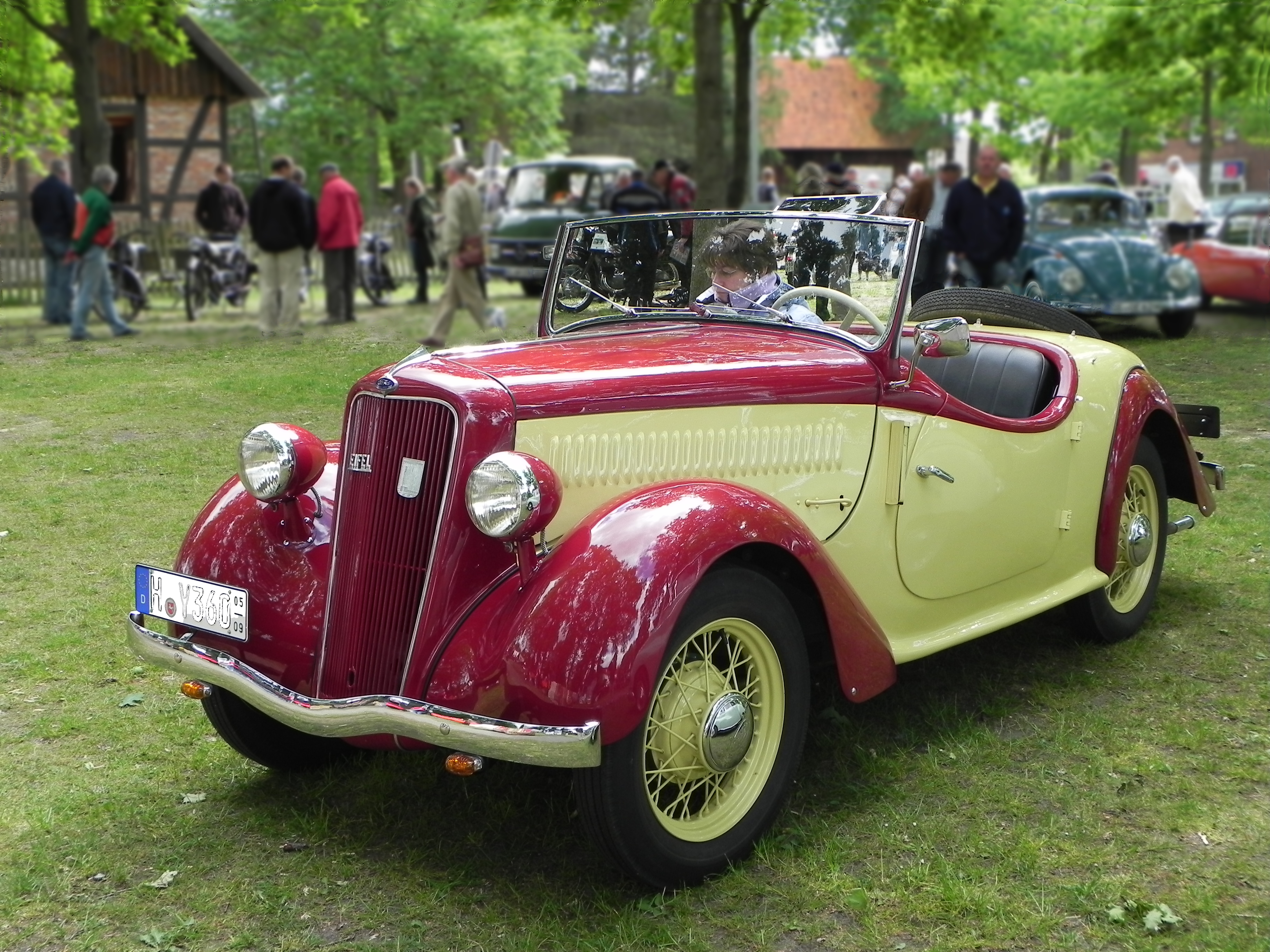
Ford Eifel roadster 1936 (before face-lift)

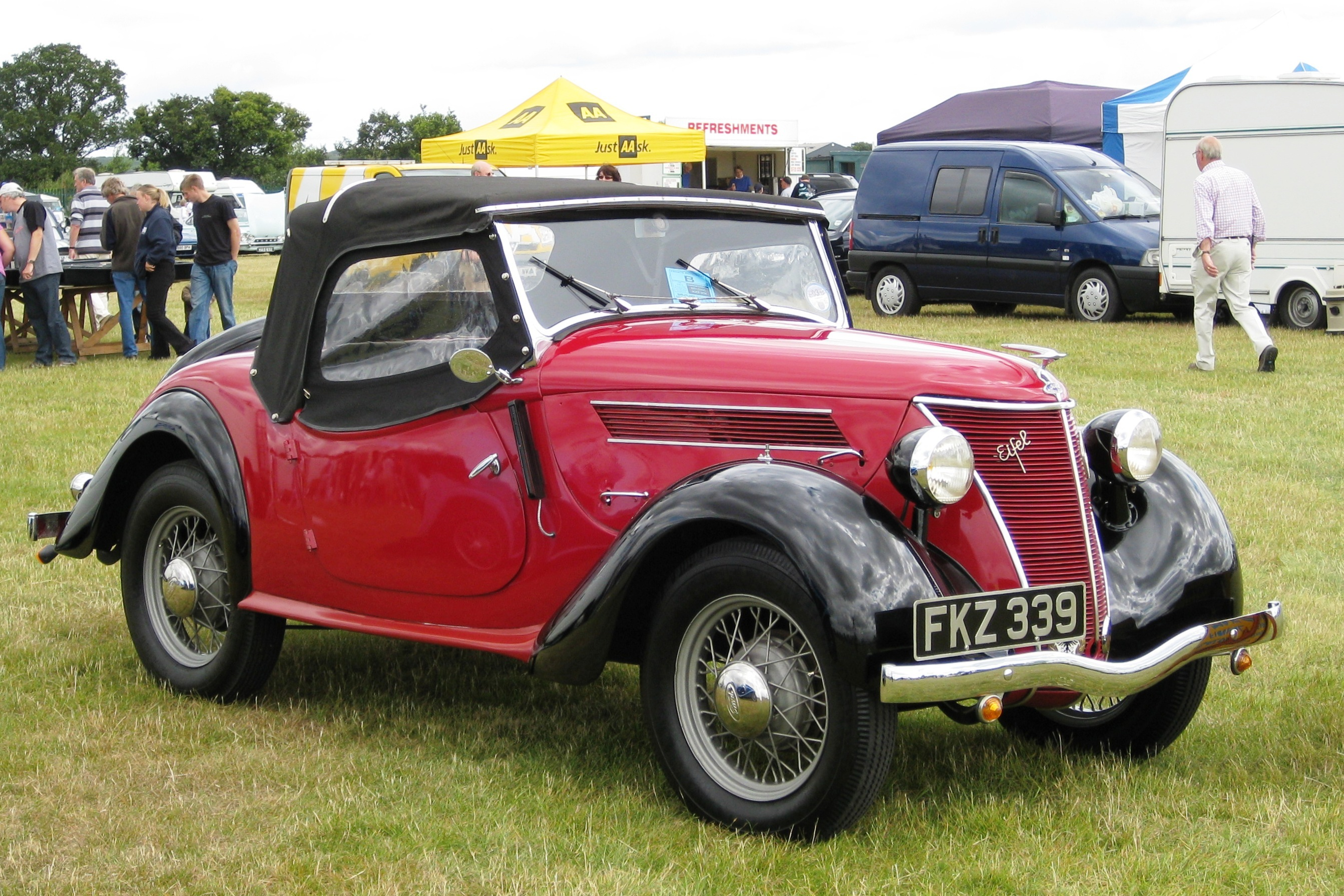
Ford Eifel roadster 1937 (after face-lift)

In Germany, 61,495 Ford Eifels were produced, representing more than half of the output of the company's Cologne factory between production of the plant's first car in 1933 and the cessation of passenger-car manufacture in 1942, following the outbreak, in 1939, of widespread European war. In large measure due to this car's popularity, Ford Germany moved from eighth place in terms of German passenger car sales in 1933 to fourth place in 1938, in the process overtaking Adler, Hanomag, Wanderer, and BMW.

The car's popularity in Germany increased after a minor face-lift in 1937, which coincided with an extension of the variety of body styles on offer, and which visually distanced the look of the car a little from its British origins, replacing the earlier car's spoked wheels with modern steel wheels and applying the eye- catching wrap-around front grille, which was becoming a feature of German Fords in the late 1930s.
