= Ford Germany =

German car manufacturer

Ford-Werke GmbH

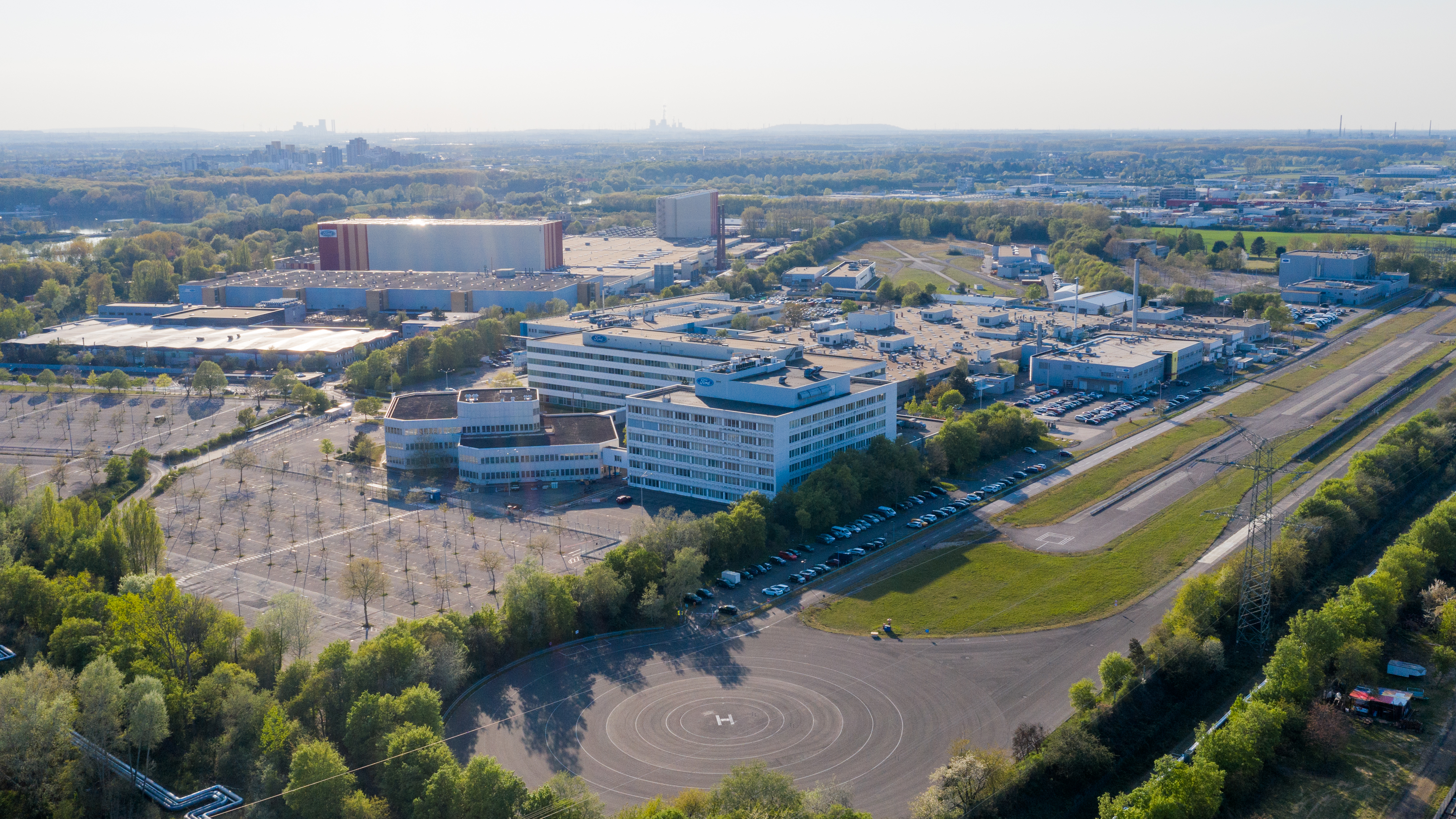
- Ford-Werke plant in Cologne
- Type: Subsidiary
- Industry: Automotive
- Founded: August 18, 1925; 101 years ago
- Founder: Henry Ford
- Headquarters: Cologne, North Rhine-Westphalia, Germany
- Number of locations: Two manufacturing facilities
- Key people: Gunnar Herrmann (chairman); Wolfgang Kopplin (CEO)
- Products: Automobiles
- Number of employees: 28,842 (2009)
- Parent: Ford of Europe
- Website: ford.de

Ford-Werke GmbH is a German-based car manufacturing company headquartered in Cologne, North Rhine-Westphalia. It is a fully owned subsidiary of American Ford Motor Company. It operates two large manufacturing facilities in Germany, a plant in Cologne and a plant in Saarlouis, and serves as a major hub for Ford's presence in the European markets.

== Berlin origins ==
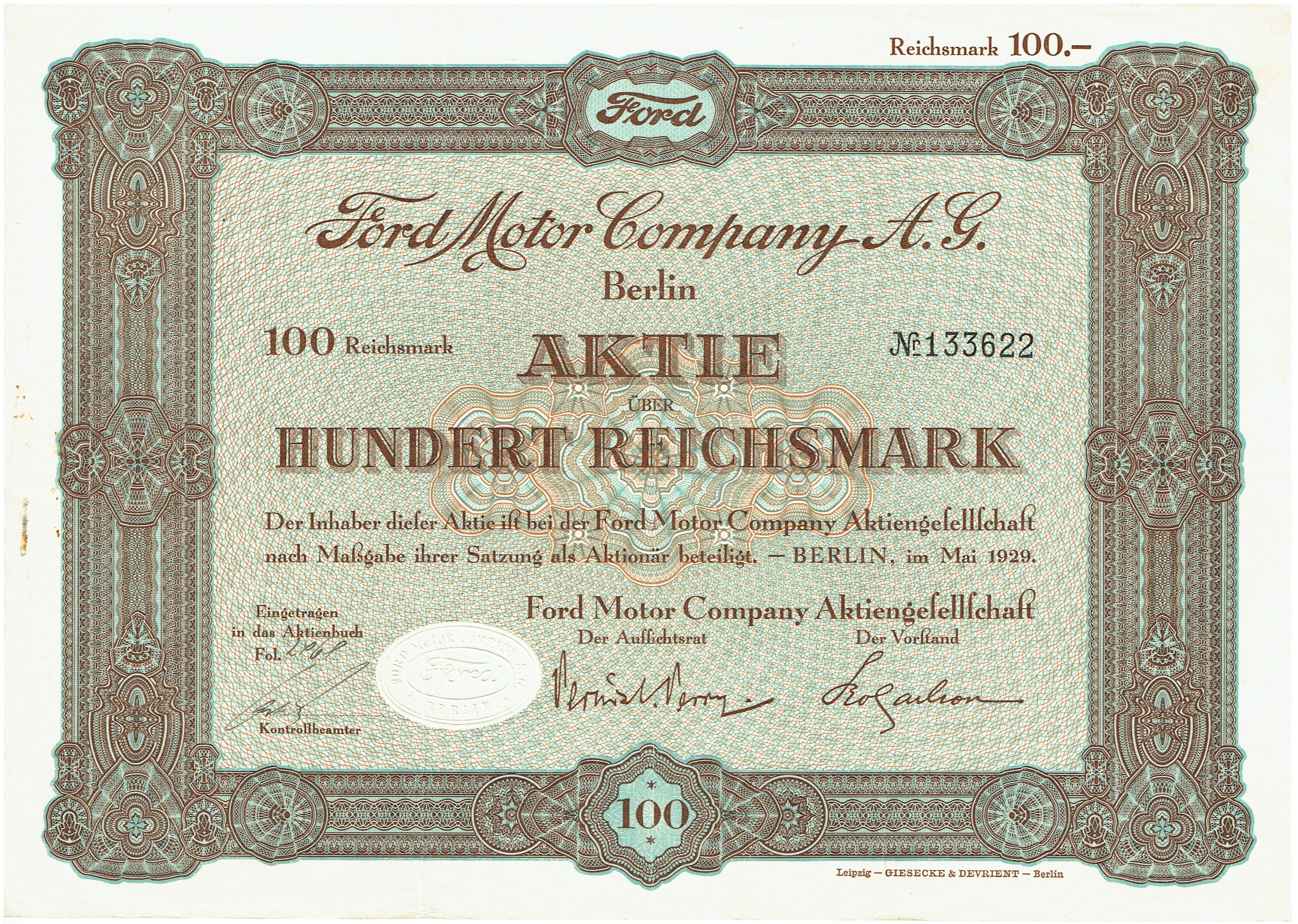
Share certificate of the Ford Motor Company AG, issued May 1929

The earliest presence of the Ford Motor Company in Germany was a parts operation set up in Hamburg in 1912.

At the end of 1924 the Ford Motor Company of the U.S. established a sales office in Berlin which at the start of 1925 received a permit to import 1,000 tractors. In 1920 the government had imposed a tariff so high that it amounted to a prohibition against importing foreign automobiles, but this was reversed in October 1925. The move had evidently been anticipated by Ford, since on 18 August 1925 the Ford Motor Company Aktiengesellschaft had been entered in the Berlin Companies Register.

During 1925 an assembly plant was constructed in a rented warehouse in the Westhafen (western port) district of Berlin, which was well located for receiving deliveries of kits and components via the country's canal network. On 1 April 1926 the first German assembled Model T was produced, using imported parts. The Berlin assembly operation produced 1,177 Model Ts in 1926 and a further 2,594 during 1927 which was the Model T's final year: in August 1927 Model T production in Berlin ended, and it was nearly a year until, on 20 August 1928, Ford auto-production in Berlin recommenced, now of the Ford Model A.

== Relocation to Cologne ==
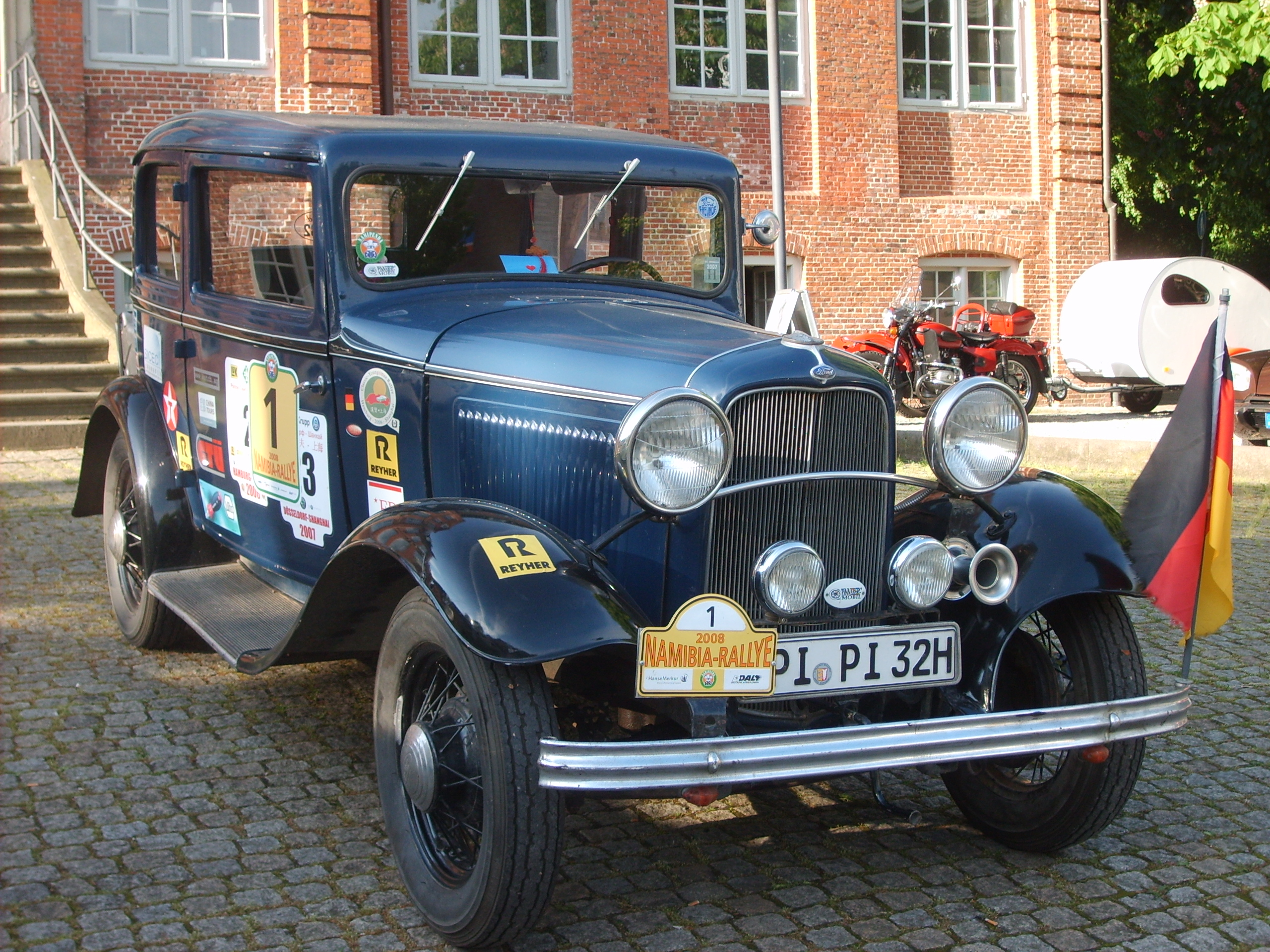
Ford Rheinland 1932

In March 1929 General Motors purchased a controlling 80% holding in Opel. Henry Ford's reaction was a prompt decision to build a complete Ford auto-factory in Germany, and before the end of 1929 a site at Cologne made available by the mayor of the city, Konrad Adenauer, was acquired by Ford. The 170,000 m^{2} site was originally intended to support an annual production of 250,000 cars, suggesting a continuation of the spirit of boundless economic optimism that seized western industry in the months preceding the 1929 Wall Street crash. Locating the plant directly beside the Rhine ensured that, as with Ford's other principal European manufacturing locations in Manchester, Dagenham and Berlin, there was excellent access to the water transport network. On 2 October 1930, Henry Ford, then aged 67, together with Adenauer, aged 55, laid the foundation stone for the Cologne Ford Plant: construction, which cost 12 million marks, progressed rapidly. The assembly operation in Berlin came to an end on 15 April 1931, and on 4 May 1931 the first Cologne-produced Ford rolled off the production line. The first vehicle produced was a Ford Model A based truck which, whether by coincidence or by design, would also be the first vehicle produced by Ford's new plant at Dagenham, England in October 1931. From that time, an increasing proportion of the Ford vehicles sold in Germany were also made locally, rather than being imported. The Model A was joined at Cologne in 1932 by the Model B.

Small car manufacture started in 1933 with the Ford Köln, a year after its British launch as the Model Y. With 2,453 produced in 1933 alone, the Köln propelled Ford to eighth place in the German passenger car sales charts for that year, but it did not have the same impact in Germany as it did in Britain, and was undercut in price by the small Opel.

The Ford Rheinland was a unique model for the German market, made by fitting a four-cylinder 3285 cc engine into a Model B V-8 chassis; but most products continued to be Detroit designs albeit with local names.

The Eifel was the German version of the 10 HP model which was sold in Britain as the Model C. 61,495 Eifels were produced by Ford Germany between 1935 and 1940, which was well over half of all the German Fords produced in the period. This enabled Ford's German sales to overtake those of Adler in 1938, making Ford Germany's fourth largest automaker, behind Opel, Mercedes-Benz and DKW. The Eifel was joined in 1939 by the first of the long-running Taunus range.

== Ford-Werke AG later Ford-Werke GmbH ==
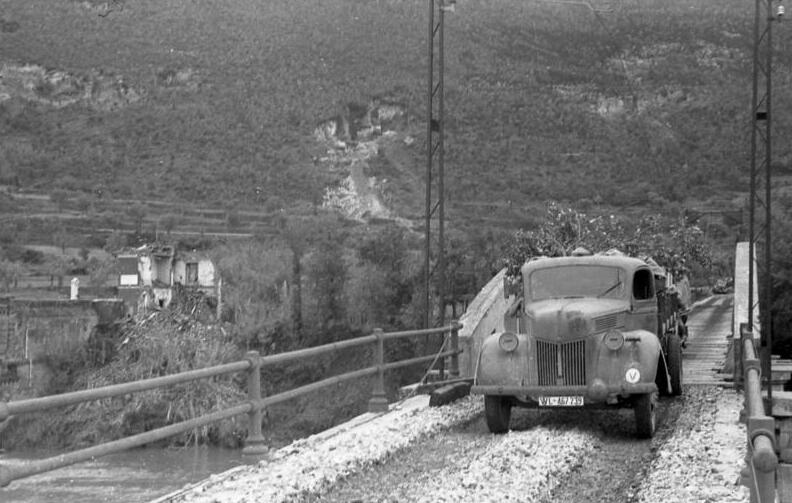
A Luftwaffe Ford V3000 truck, Italy, 1943

The company was reorganised in 1939 and changed its name to Ford-Werke. With the outbreak of the war, car production continued at first, and the Taunus was made until 1942, but increasingly, military production took over. Ford-Werke built both conventional trucks and Maultier half-tracks for the German armed forces. Most notably, Ford-Werke manufactured the turbines used in the V-2 rockets.

During the bombing of Cologne, instructions were given to allied bombers not to bomb the factory, owing to deep monetary ties of the American Ford Motor Company and Nazi Germany, and hence was lightly damaged. After the war ended, production could restart in May 1945 with truck manufacture, the U.S. government having paid $1.1 million in consideration of bombing damage.

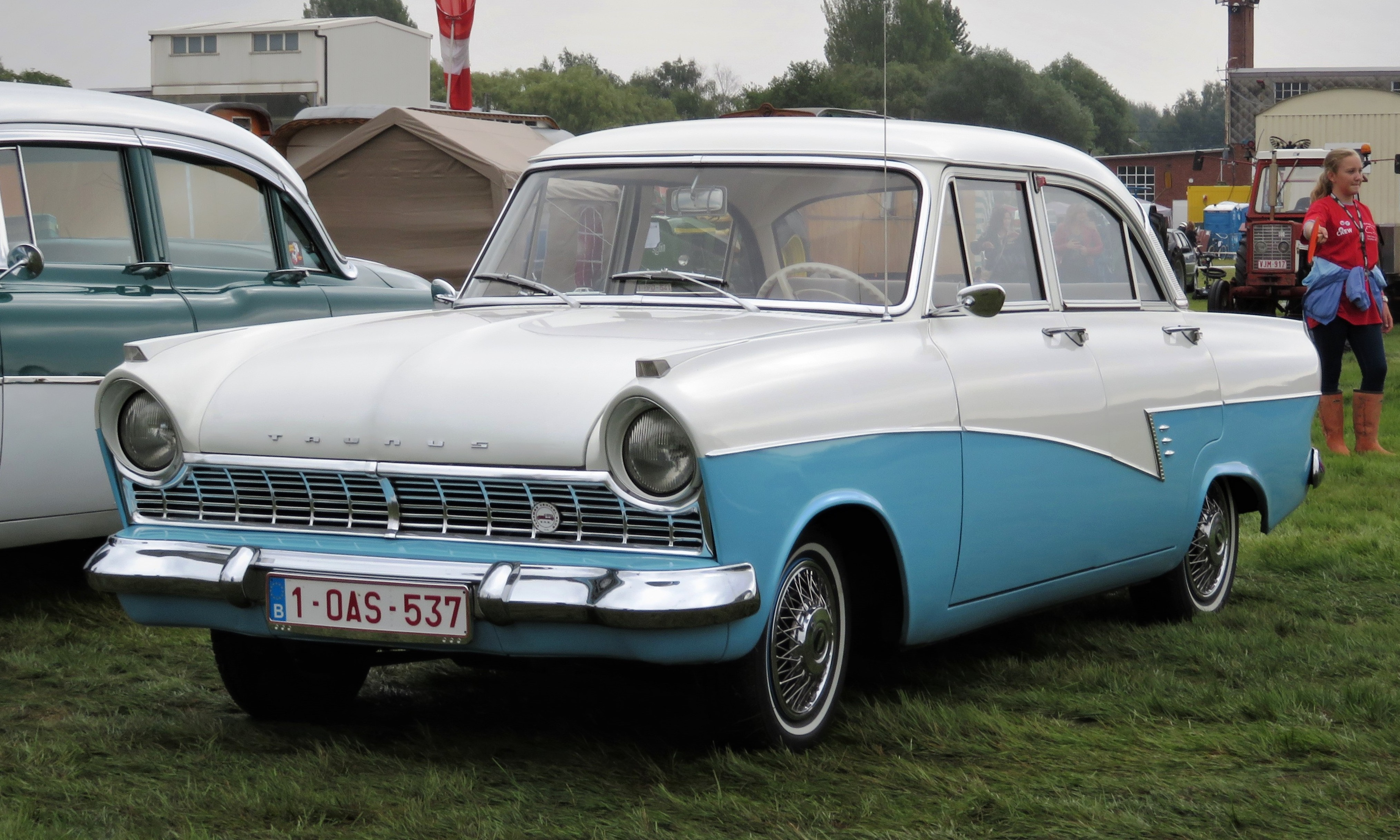
A Ford Taunus P2.

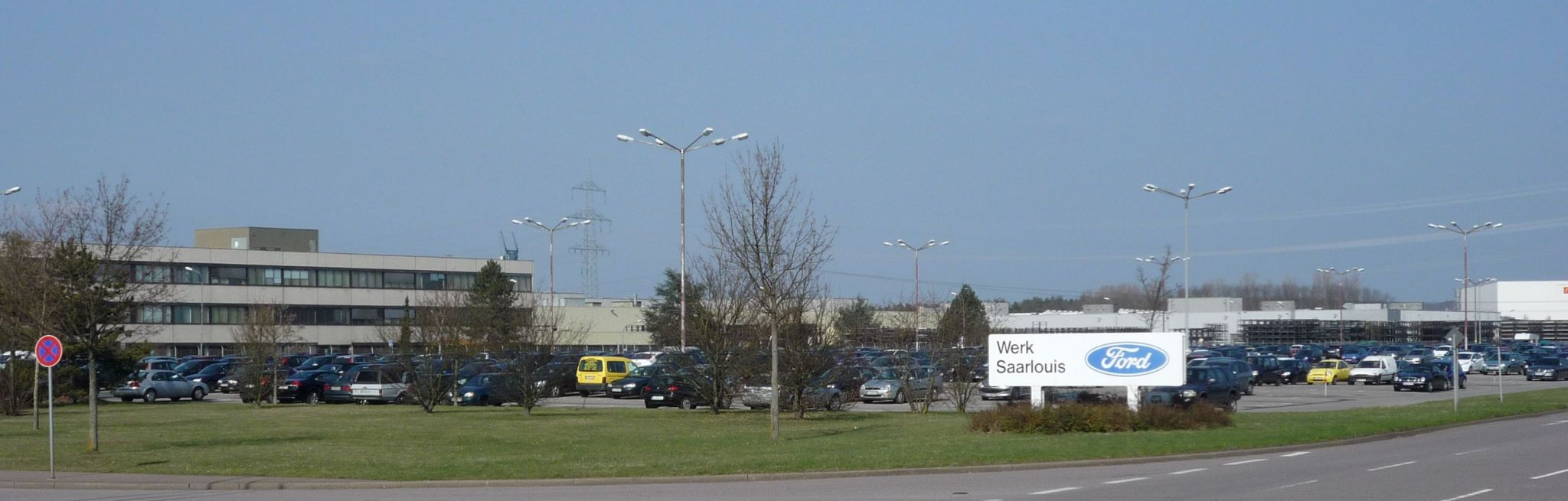
Ford factory in Saarlouis

Car manufacturing restarted in late 1948 with the Taunus. Henry Ford II visited the factory in 1948 during his visit to Germany when he was considering a purchase of Volkswagen, with which he did not ultimately proceed.

In 1952, a new Taunus appeared and was a great success, enabling record production figures to be reached. The company was now being run by Ehrhart Vitger, who spent time recruiting new dealers to replace those lost in East Germany, but the company continued to rank third in sales in Germany behind VW and Opel.

Ford began to integrate the operations of its European subsidiaries in the 1960s with the launch of the 1965 Ford Transit panel van, which was a joint development between Ford of Britain and Ford-Werke, however it was the Ford Escort in 1968 that truly marked the end of unique models in European countries and followed the creation of Ford Europe in 1967 from the assets of the British and German operations.

General Motors would later follow Ford's lead in the 1970s by integrating its Opel and Vauxhall subsidiaries into GM Europe.

=== Use of forced labor during World War II ===
During the Second World War, Ford-Werke employed slave laborers, although not required to do so by the Nazi regime.

Robert Schmidt|Robert Hans Schmidt presided over Ford-Werke during the Second World War, and engaged slave labor and the illegal manufacture of munitions, including such manufacturing during the period before the U.S. entry into the war. Once the war was over, notwithstanding all his carefully publicized efforts to erase the stain of the company's past, no evidence emerged that either Henry Ford II or any other top-level Ford Motor Company executive had ever raised any moral objections to rehiring [Schmidt], who had presided over one of the company's darkest chapters. However, a three-year study which was published by the Ford Motor Company in December 2001 maintained that the U.S. headquarters had no control over what happened at the German Ford-Werke when the Nazi forced labour policy went into effect. It was also maintained that the German subsidiary did not provide profit for the U.S. headquarters. John Rintamaki, Ford´s chief of staff, would acknowledge that Ford-Werke used forced labour, stating that "The use of forced and slave labor in Germany, including at Ford-Werke, was wrong and cannot be justified."

In 1942, German soldiers swept into the city of Rostov in the Soviet Union, moving among the homes of Rostov families, forcing them to register at a labor registration center. Elsa Iwanowa, who was 16 years old at the time, and many other Russians were transported in cattle cars to Wuppertal in the western part of Germany, where they were exhibited to visiting businessmen. From there Elsa Iwanowa and others were forced to become slave laborers for Ford-Werke. "On March 4, 1998, fifty-three years after she was liberated from the German Ford plant, Elsa Iwanowa demanded justice, filing a class-action lawsuit in U.S. District Court against the Ford Motor Company." In court, Ford acknowledged that Elsa Iwanowa and many others like her were "forced to endure a sad and terrible experience" at Ford-Werke; Ford, however, maintained that cases like that of Elsa Iwanowa are best redressed on "a nation-to-nation, government-to-government" basis. By November 1998, compensation lawsuits were filed against Ford and GM. This put both the German subsidiaries of both companies under heavy scrutiny for their roles in aiding Nazi forced labor on their production lines in territory controlled by Nazi Germany during World War II. In 1999, the court dismissed Elsa Iwanowa's suit; however, a number of German companies, including GM subsidiary Opel, agreed to contribute $5.1 billion to a fund that would compensate the surviving slave laborers. After being the subject of much adverse publicity, Ford, in March 2000, reversed direction, and agreed to contribute $13 million to the industry-government restitution fund for an estimated 1.2 million survivors of Nazi forced labor during World War II.

== Ford Motor Co. AG ==
Until 27 January 1950, all Ford's European operations other than in the USSR were run from Dagenham and owned by Ford Motor Company Limited, Dearborn's 55% owned subsidiary. In Ford Motor Company Limited's published reports to their British shareholders, Germany and the other Ford European interests were referred to as "the associated companies". These associated companies had been established in order to allow for substantial holdings by local shareholders. (Note: The company (Ford Motor Company Limited of Dagenham) has been formed to acquire and carry on as a going concern the business of motor vehicle manufacturers of: Ford Motor Company (England) Limited, Manchester; Henry Ford and Son Limited, Cork; It will also acquire through holding their share capitals: Automobiles Ford S.A., Paris; Ford Motor Company A/S, Copenhagen; Ford Motor Company S.A.E., Barcelona; Ford Motor Company of Belgium S.A., Antwerp; Ford Motor Company d'Italia S.A., Trieste; N.V. Ford Motor Company of Holland, Rotterdam; Ford Motor Company A.B., Stockholm; Ford Motor Company A.G., Berlin; Ford Motor Company of Finland O/Y, Helsingfors; The new company will offer 40% of the share capital of all the Continental companies to the public in their respective countries. The Company will also acquire the sole and exclusive rights . . . Ford products in the following parts of the world: United Kingdom and Ireland the Channel Islands and the Isle of Man; The continent of Europe (excluding USSR); Asia Minor, Iraq, Persia, Afghanistan, Egypt and certain other parts of Africa; and the benefit of all the patents inventions, drawings, designs . . . . . owned by the Ford Motor Company of America and Mr Henry Ford) On the outbreak of the Second World War, those shares in Ford Motor Company AG not belonging to German shareholders were placed under the control of the German Commissioner for dealing with enemy property.

== Aston Martin Engine Plant ==
In October 2004, when Aston Martin was a wholly owned subsidiary of Ford, the company set up a dedicated 12,500 square metres (135,000 sq ft) engine production plant within the Ford Niehl plant, with capacity to produce up to 5000 engines a year by 100 specially trained personnel. Like traditional Aston Martin engine production in Newport Pagnell, assembly of each unit is entrusted to a single technician from a pool of 30, with V8 and V12 variants assembled in under 20 hours. By bringing engine production back to within the company, the promise was that Aston Martin would be able to produce small runs of higher performance variants engines.

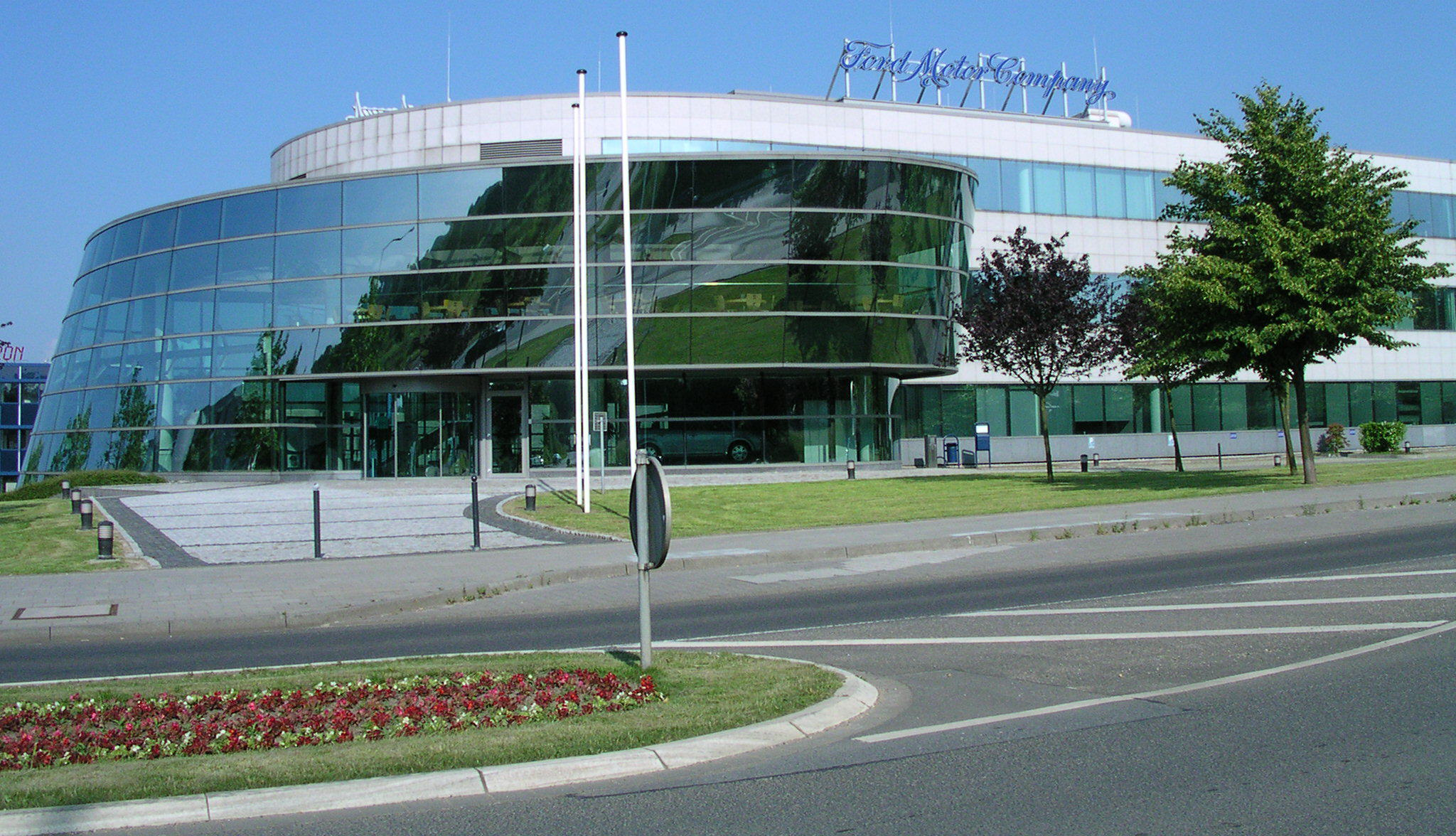
Ford Research and Advanced Engineering Center in Aachen

== Marketing ==
=== Slogans ===
Ford's corporate tagline is Eine Idee weiter., meaning “A step ahead” (literally, “An idea further”). This German tagline is used in German speaking countries in Europe.

== Sales and market share in Germany ==
Year	Units	Market share
2012	206,128	6.70%
2011	230,939	7.31%
2010	198,156	6.79%
2009	290,620	7.63%
2008	217,305	7.03%
2007	213,873	6.79%
2006	243,845	7.03%
2005	246,814	7.38%
2004	243,930	7.47%
2003	235,279	7.27%

== production Ford Germany ==
Year	Production Cars	delivery van (car)	model
May 4, 1931			AA, A
1932	~ 5.000		
1933	~ 10.000		B, Y, V8
1958	~ 100.000		
1970	641.677	2.772	
1971	736.919	2.215	
1972	669.332	0	
1973	701.977	0	
1974	423.902	0	
1975	594.665	0	
1976	771.135	0	
1977	828.134	0	
1978	808.934	0	
1979	803.841	0	
1980	592.812	0	
1981	688.326	0	
1982	749.722	0	
1983	798.939	0	
1984	752.695	0	
1985	734.711	0	
1986	802.833	0	
2016	340.712 (K)	0	
Sum			

== Models ==
=== Current model range ===
The following tables list Ford production vehicles that were sold in Germany in as of January 2026:

==== Passenger cars ====
Kuga	Compact crossover SUV	SUV
Puma	crossover SUV	SUV
Explorer EV	SUV	SUV
Mustang Mach-E	SUV	SUV
Mustang	Muscle Car	Coupé; Convertible

==== Light commercial vehicles ====
Tourneo Connect	Panel van	5-door panel van; 5-door leisure activity vehicle
Transit	Light commercial vehicle	Chassis Cab
Ranger	Pick-up truck	2-door single cab; 2-door open cab; 4-door double cab/crew cab

=== Former Ford Germany model range ===
This is a list of models produced by Ford Germany prior to the creation of Ford of Europe. Although the Taunus TC and MK3 Ford Cortina were related, the body work and engines were different.

- Ford Model A
- Ford Model B
- Ford Rheinland
- Ford Model Y
- Ford Köln
- Ford Eifel
- Ford Taunus G93A "Buckeltaunus"
- Ford Taunus P1
- Ford Taunus P2
- Ford Taunus P3
- Ford Taunus P4
- Ford Taunus P5
- Ford Taunus P6
- Ford P7
- Ford Taunus TC
- Ford Fiesta
- Ford Focus
- Ford Explorer

== See also ==
- Henry Ford
- Ford of Europe
- Ford Motor Company
- Ford of Britain
- List of German cars
- Merkur
- Ford-Aktion
