= Travel =

Movement of people between relatively distant geographical locations

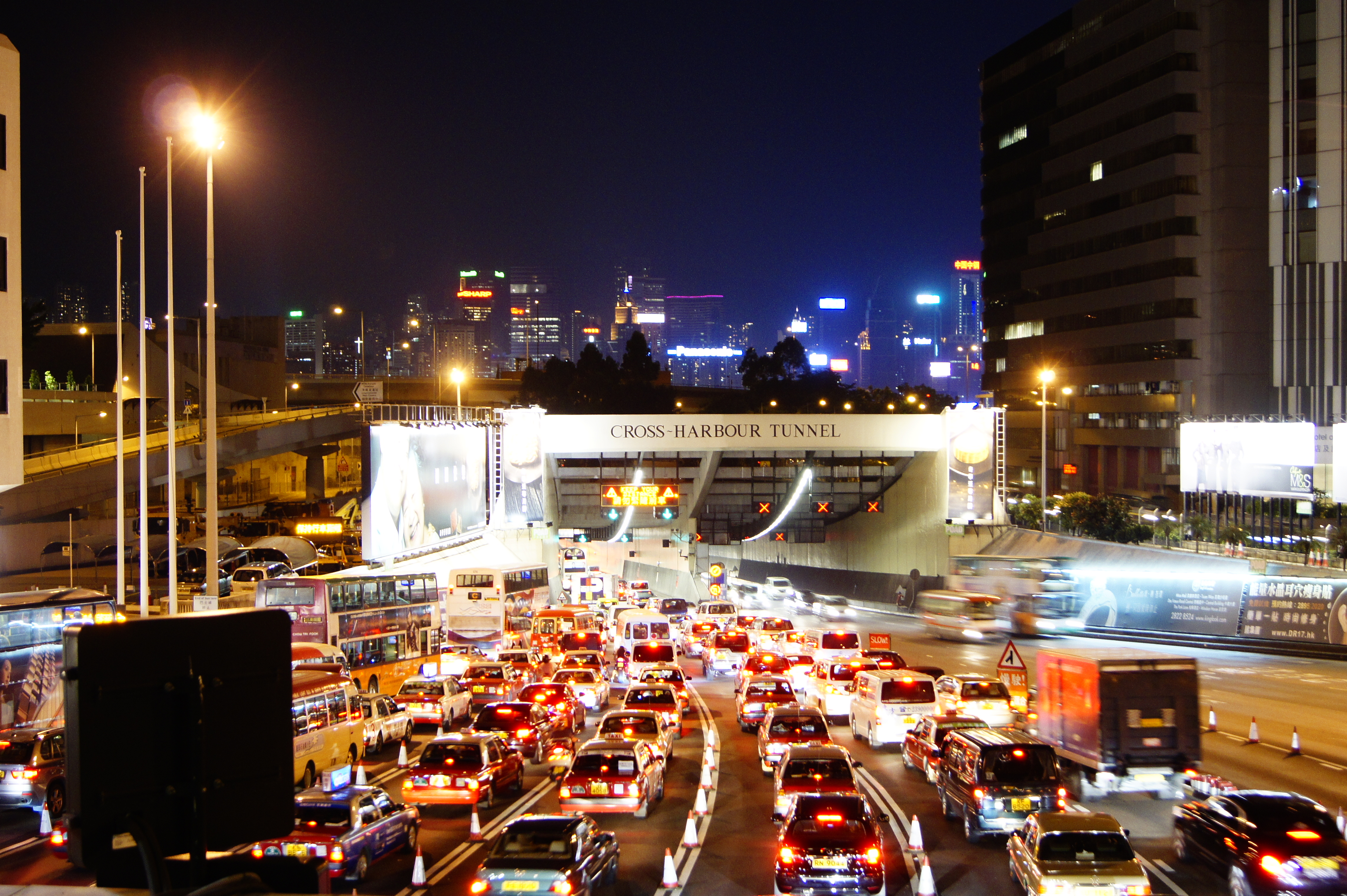
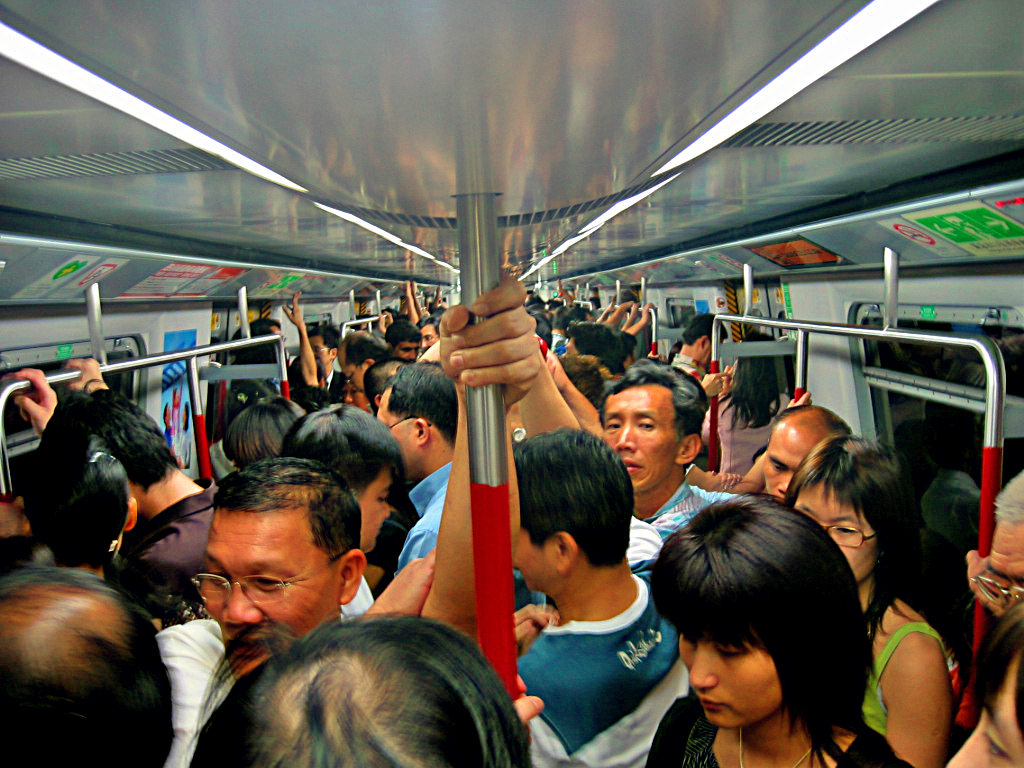
Methods of travel in Hong Kong, the most visited city according to Euromonitor. Top to bottom: the Cross-Harbour Tunnel and the MTR.

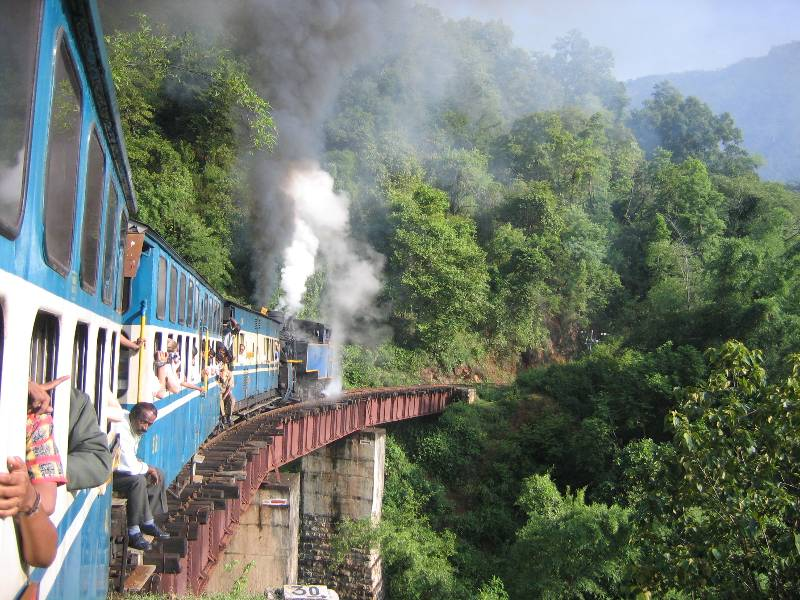
Train travel – Passengers on a train on a bridge of the Nilgiri Mountain Railway, between Mettupalayam and Ootacamund, in Tamil Nadu, India

Travel is the movement of people between distant geographical locations. Travel can be done by foot, bicycle, automobile, train, boat, bus, airplane, ship or other means; with or without luggage; and can be one way or round trip. Travel can also include relatively short stays between successive movements, as in the case of tourism.

== Etymology ==
The origin of the word "travel" is most likely lost to history. The term "travel" may originate from the Old French word travail, which means 'work'. According to the Merriam-Webster dictionary, the first known use of the word travel was in the 14th century. It also states that the word comes from Middle English travailen, travelen (which means to torment, labor, strive, journey) and earlier from Old French travailler (which means to work strenuously, toil).

In English, people still occasionally use the word travail, which means struggle. According to Simon Winchester in his book The Best Travelers' Tales (2004), the words travel and travail both share an even more ancient root: a Roman instrument of torture called the tripalium (in Latin it means "three stakes", as in to impale). This link may reflect the extreme difficulty of travel in ancient times. Travel in modern times may or may not be much easier, depending on the destination. Travel to Mount Everest, the Amazon rainforest, extreme tourism, and adventure travel are more difficult forms of travel. Travel can also be more difficult depending on the method of travel, such as by bus, cruise ship, or even by bullock cart.

== Purpose and motivation ==
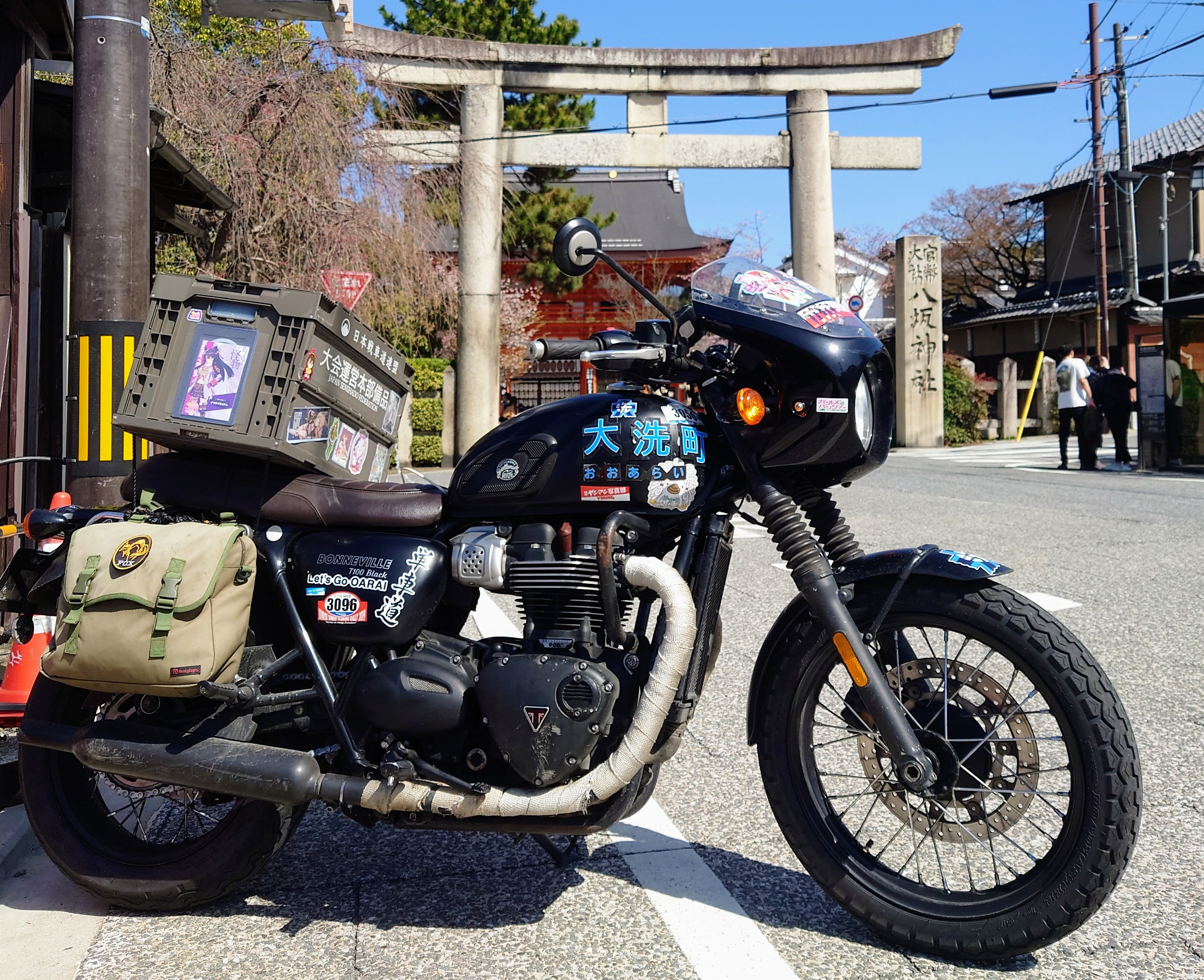
Traveler's motorcycle with large rear box

Reasons for traveling include recreation, holidays, rejuvenation, tourism or vacationing, research travel, the gathering of information, visiting people, volunteer travel for charity, migration to begin life somewhere else, religious pilgrimages and mission trips, business travel, trade, commuting, obtaining health care, waging or fleeing war, for the enjoyment of traveling, or other reasons. Travelers may use human-powered transport such as walking or bicycling; or vehicles, such as public transport, automobiles, trains, ferries, boats, cruise ships and airplanes.

Motives for travel include:

- Pleasure
- Relaxation
- Discovery and exploration
- Adventure
- Intercultural communications
- Taking personal time for building interpersonal relationships.
- Avoiding stress
- Forming memories
- Cultural experiences
- Volunteering
- Festivals and events

== History ==
Travel dates back to antiquity where wealthy Greeks and Romans would travel for leisure to their summer homes and villas in cities such as Pompeii and Baiae. While early travel tended to be slower, more dangerous, and more dominated by trade and migration, cultural and technological advances over many years have tended to mean that travel has become easier and more accessible. Humankind has come a long way in transportation since Christopher Columbus sailed to the New World from Spain in 1492, an expedition which took over 10 weeks to arrive at the final destination; to the 21st century when aircraft allows travel from Spain to the United States overnight.

Travel in the Middle Ages offered hardships and challenges, though it was important to the economy and to society. The wholesale sector depended (for example) on merchants dealing with/through caravans or sea-voyagers, end-user retailing often demanded the services of many itinerant peddlers wandering from village to hamlet, gyrovagues (wandering monks) and wandering friars brought theology and pastoral support to neglected areas, traveling minstrels toured, and armies ranged far and wide in various crusades and in sundry other wars. Pilgrimages were common in both the European and Islamic world and involved streams of travelers both locally and internationally.

In the late 16th century, it became fashionable for young European aristocrats and wealthy upper-class men to travel to significant European cities as part of their education in the arts and literature. This was known as the Grand Tour, and included cities such as London, Paris, Venice, Florence, and Rome. However, the French Revolution brought with it the end of the Grand Tour.

Travel by water often provided more comfort and speed than land-travel, at least until the advent of a network of railways in the 19th century.

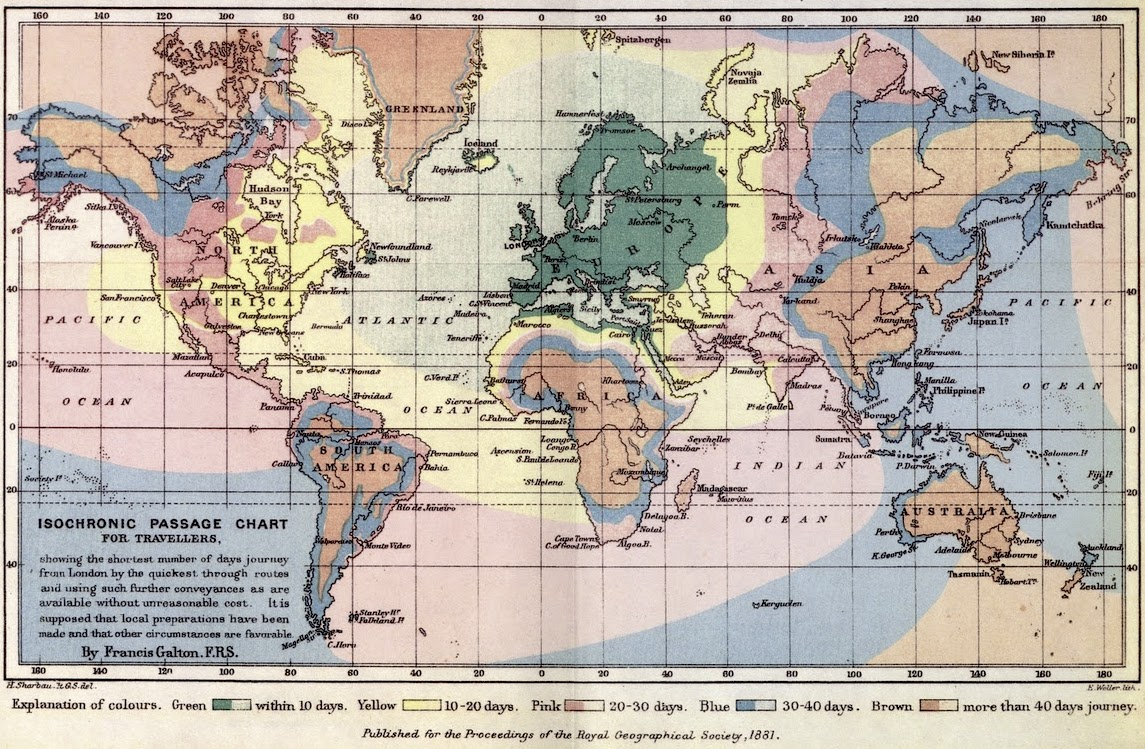
Francis Galton's first known isochronic map published for the Proceedings of the Royal Geographical Society. It shows the travel times in 1881 from London, United Kingdom to different parts of the world in days: green color areas for less than 10 days to reach, yellow color areas between 10 to 20 days to reach, pink color areas between 20 to 30 days to reach, blue color areas between 30 to 40 days to reach and brown color is for areas which will take more than 40 days to reach

Travel for the purpose of tourism is reported to have started around this time when people began to travel for fun as travel was no longer a hard and challenging task. This was capitalized on by people like Thomas Cook selling tourism packages where trains and hotels were booked together. Airships and airplanes took over much of the role of long-distance surface travel in the 20th century, notably after the Second World War where there was a surplus of both aircraft and pilots. Air travel has become so ubiquitous in the 21st century that one woman, Alexis Alford, visited all 196 countries before the age of 21.

== Geographic types ==
Travel may be local, regional, national (domestic) or international. In some countries, non-local internal travel may require an internal passport, while international travel typically requires a passport and visa. Tours are a common type of travel. Examples of travel tours are expedition cruises, small group tours, and river cruises.

== Safety ==
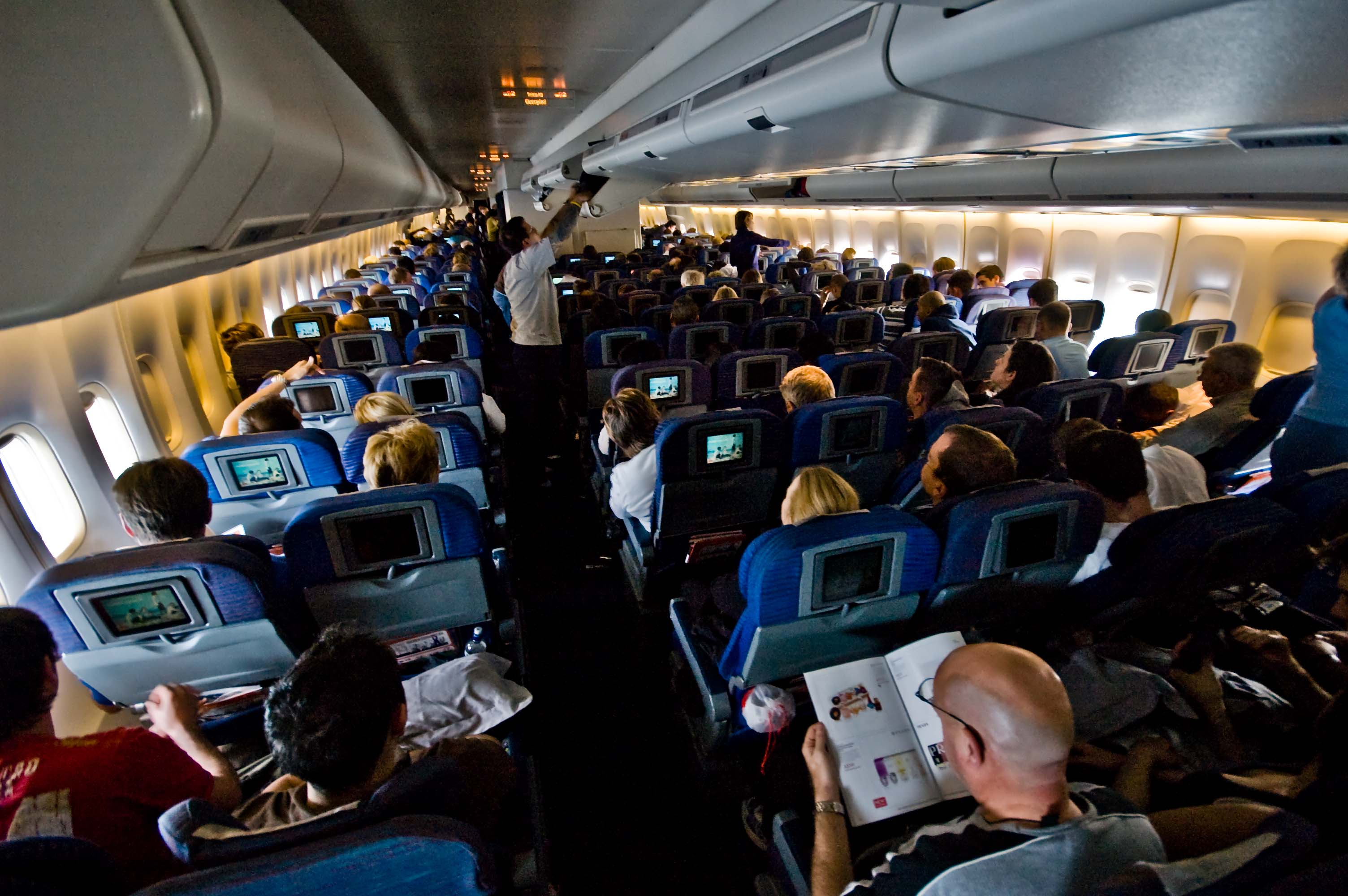
Travelers in a British Airways 747 airplane. Air travel is a common means of transport.

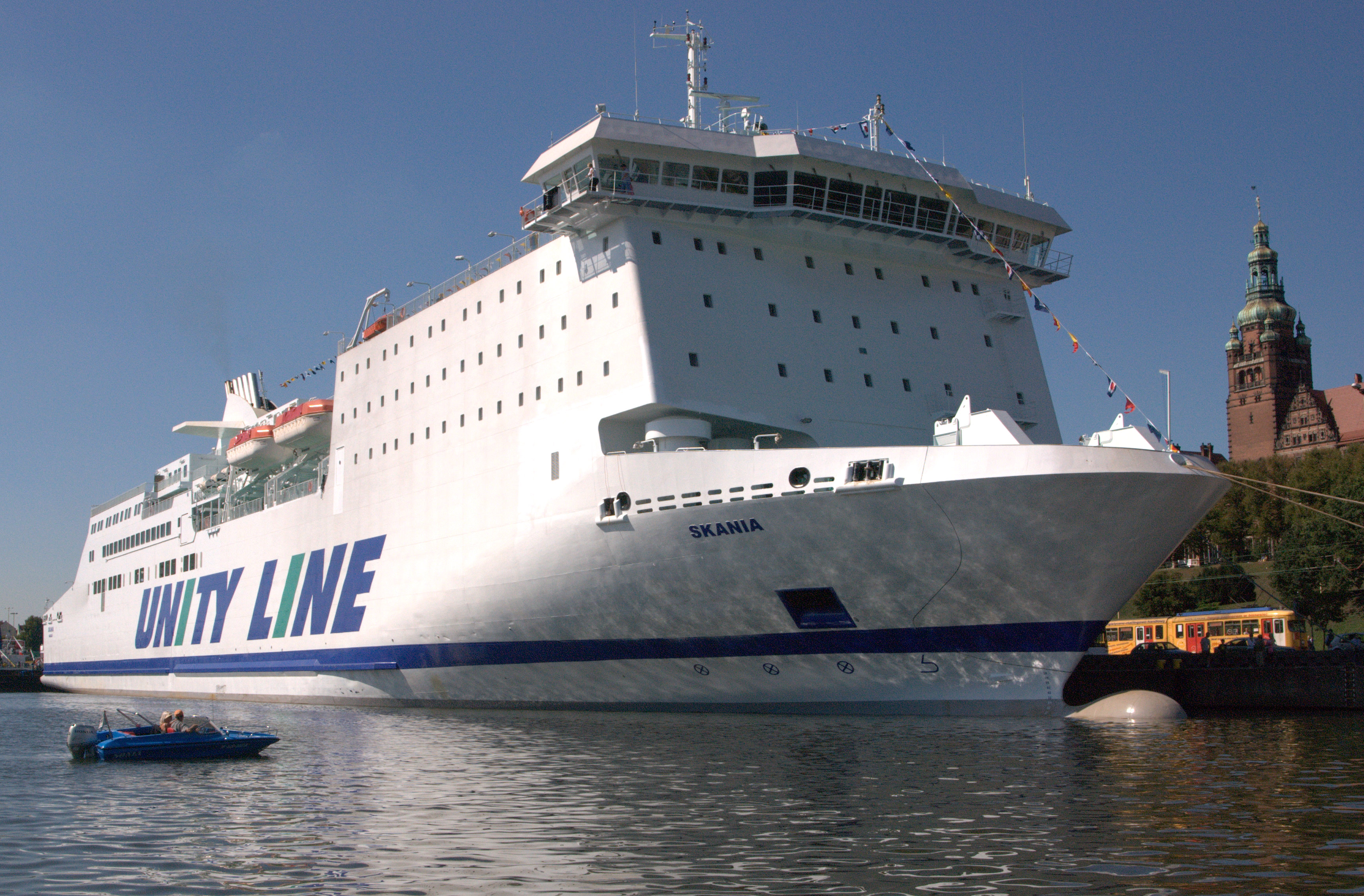
MS Skania ferry in the port of Szczecin

Authorities emphasize the importance of taking precautions to ensure travel safety. When traveling abroad, the odds favor a safe and incident-free trip, however, travelers can be subject to difficulties, crime and violence. Some safety considerations include being aware of one's surroundings, avoiding being the target of a crime, leaving copies of one's passport and itinerary information with trusted people, obtaining medical insurance valid in the country being visited and registering with one's national embassy when arriving in a foreign country. Many countries do not recognize drivers' licenses from other countries; however most countries accept international driving permits. Automobile insurance policies issued in one's own country are often invalid in foreign countries, and it is often a requirement to obtain temporary auto insurance valid in the country being visited. It is also advisable to become oriented with the driving rules and regulations of destination countries. Wearing a seat belt is highly advisable for safety reasons; many countries have penalties for violating seatbelt laws.

There are three main statistics which may be used to compare the safety of various forms of travel (based on a Department of the Environment, Transport and the Regions survey in October 2000):

Mode	Deaths per billion		
Mode	Journeys	Hours	Kilometers
Bus	4.3	11.1	0.4
Rail	20	30	0.6
Air	117	30.8	0.05
Ship	90	50	2.6
Van	20	60	1.2
Car	40	130	3.1
Walking	40	220	54
Bicycle	170	550	45
Motorcycle	1640	4840	109

== See also ==
- Environmental impact of aviation
- Layover
- List of travelers
- Mode of transport
- Recreational travel
- Right of return
- Science tourism
- Transport
- Tourism
