= Michel Boivin =

French historian and anthropologist

Michel Boivin is a French historian and anthropologist who specializes in South Asia. Trained in contemporary history, Islamic studies and ethnology, he is currently Emeritus Director of Research at the Centre national de la recherche scientifique (CNRS: French National Center for Scientific Research) and a member of the CESAH (Centre for the Study of South Asia and the Himalayas), former CEIAS (Center for South Asian Studies) at the School for Advanced Studies in the Social Sciences (EHESS). He had taught at the Université de Savoie Mont Blanc, at Sciences Po Lyon, as well as at The Catholic University of Lyon. He has co-directed three seminars at the EHESS: "History and Anthropology of the Muslim Societies of South Asia", "Authority and Politics in the Sufism of South and Central Asia", and "Material Culture and devotion among the Shia societies". In addition, he contributed to the organization of two CEIAS research groups: "Vernacular Cultures and New Muslim Elites", with Julien Levesque, and "Gujarati and Sindhi Studies: Societies, Languages and Cultures", with Pierre Lachaier.

== Biography ==
After studying at Chambéry high school with an emphasis in the humanities, Michel Boivin became an expert on the Modern history of the Muslim world. He holds a DEA in Arabic and Islamic studies from the Université Lyon 2, and obtained a doctorat in Oriental Languages, Civilizations and Societies from the Université Paris 3-Sorbonne Nouvelle on Isma’ilian Shi’ism and Modernity in Sultân Muhammad Shâh Aghâ Khân (1877–1957), and then an habilitation thesis in ethnology from the Université Paris Ouest-Nanterre, on the topic of Shi’ism, Sufism and Social dynamics in Contemporary Sindh (19th century–20th century). Michel Boivin is specialized in the study of the contemporary history and historical anthropology of Muslim communities in India and Pakistan during the colonial period, and since independence was obtained. After having devoted several years to the study of the Isma’ilians of these regions, he shifted his focus to Sufi groups. He directs a research team on "History and Sufism in the Indus Valley" at the CEIAS (EHESS-CNRS). From 2008 to 2011, this team has worked on an interdisciplinary and international project centered on the Sufi site of Sehwan Sharif. This mid-size city located in the southern Province of Pakistan called Sindh is where the tomb of the Sufi saint Lal Shahbaz Qalandar (d. 1274) is located. This sanctuary has become a site of pilgrimage where ecstatic dance practices take place. In addition, it is also an ecumenical center, as Hindus still play an important part in the rituals. Finally, Sehwan Sharif is a gathering place for gyrovague renouncers, used to be called "qalandars" and are now most often referred to as "malangs".

One of his most recent research interests is in "Hindu Sufism" in Pakistan and India. To start out, Michel Boivin retraced the migratory paths of Sindhi Hindus, then researched their Sufi rituals in order to evaluate the extent to which they had to change to adapt to their new environment. In parallel, he has begun work on collecting the publications and manuscripts on Sufism in the Sindhi language. Despite his emphasis on historical anthropology, Michel Boivin continues to work on the appearance of new forms of knowledge in the 19th century. He is particularly interested in the production of a new culture in the Sindh province as a result of interaction between British colonial rule, the emergence of new elites and the objectification of Sufism. His work is therefore to be understood as a continuation of postcolonial studies, as he is engaged in reconstructing the evolution of the "Sufi culture of Sindh" based on archival work carried out in the Indian sub-continent and in Europe. During the last years, he used to employ iconography as a meaningful data to fill gaps resulting from the lack of written sources.

Michel Boivin teaches Historical Anthropology of South Asia at EHESS, Paris, with a focus on the Sindhicate area. He created in 2008 the Mission Interdisciplinaire Française du Sindh (MIFS) and signed an MOU with the department of Antiquities, Government of Sindh. The same year, an electronic newsletter was launched. In 2010, the MIFS became a register NGO (Association Loi 1901) in France. In 2011, Michel Boivin started the Centre for Social Science in Karachi (CSSK), with an MOU with the Alliance Française de Karachi which was hosting the centre. The same year, he funded the CSSK Series with OUP Pakistan. The CSSK organizes academic events and in 2015, it became a register NGO (Association Loi 1901) under French law. The CSSK organizes conferences, exhibitions, as well as training in Social Sciences for students, which are followed by field trips in Sindh. Beyond supervising PhD students at EHESS, he is also an external examiner at the University of Karachi and the University of Sindh. As director of CSSK, he signed a MOU with N. E. D. University, Department of Architecture and Planning, Karachi in 2017. This MOU wished to reinforce the cooperation between the CEIAS and the N. E. D. University for the new project Michel Boivin had launched in 2016: the Uderolal Research Project (ULRP). Throughout this new ongoing project, the aim is to devote a multidisciplinary approach to the study of a sacred figure named Jhulelal, as well as with many other names, knowing it is worshipped both in Pakistan and in India, mostly by Sindhi speaking populations.

In 2011, Michel Boivin was nominated as member of the National Committee of CNRS, section 38 Ethnology, Anthropology and Sociology of Religions. In 2016, he was elected member in the same committee for a tenure of five years. In 2017, Michel Boivin was elected Director of the Centre for South Asian Studies (CNRS-EHESS), with three co-directors, and his tenure was from January 1, 2019 to December 31, 2022. In 2021, he was co-founding as co-editor with Matthew Cook the Journal of Sindhi Studies, published by Brill Publishers, and in 2022, Critical Pakistan Studies published by Cambridge University Press, with Matthew Cook, Kamran Asdar Ali and Amina Yaqin. Before his retirement, he decided to devote a fieldwork back to the Ismaili Studies. The first part was made in the Roshan Khayal Dawoodi Bohra community of Malegaon, in Maharashtra, and the second one was devoted to two main sites of the Nizari Ismaili community in Mumbai itself, namely the Darkhana Jama'at Khana in Dongri, and Hasan Ali Shah's dargah in Mazagaon.The latter CNRS field was also linked to a project he was starting with Karen Ruffle (University of Toronto) on Muslim devotion to the ahl-e bait. Michel Boivin retired in may 2023, and he became Emeritus Research Director at CNRS, Centre for the Study of South Asia and the Himalayas (CESAH). He is currently working with Matthew Cook on a Handbook of Sindhi Studies, to be published by Routledge.

== Works ==
=== Books ===
- Boivin, Michel (1996). Le Pakistan. Que sais-Je?. Vol. 970. Presses universitaires de France. ISBN 9782130475620.
- Boivin, Michel (1998). Les Ismaéliens: des communautés d'Asie du sud entre islamisation et indianisation [The Ismailis: the South Asian communities between Islamisation and indianisation]. Maredsous: Editions Brepols. ISBN 9782503506876.
- Boivin, Michel (2003). La rénovation du shî'isme ismaélien en Inde et au Pakistan – d'après les écrits et les discours de Sultân Muhammad Shâh Aghâ Khân (1902-1954) [The renovation of Ismaili Shi'ism in India and Pakistan]. Londres: RoutledgeCurzon. ISBN 9781136850264.
- Boivin, Michel (2007). Les Ismaéliens d'Asie du sud: gestion des héritages et production identitaire. Paris: L’Harmattan. ISBN 9782296203129.
- Boivin, Michel, ed. (2008). Sindh Through History and Representations: French Contributions to Sindhi Studies. Karachi: Oxford University Press. ISBN 9780195475036.
- Boivin, Michel; Cook, Matthew A., eds. (2010). Interpreting the Sindhi World: Essays on Society and History. Karachi: Oxford University Press. ISBN 9780195477191.
- Boivin, Michel (2011). Artefacts of Devotion. A Sufi Repertoire of the Qalandariyya in Sehwan Sharif, Sindh (Pakistan). Karachi: Oxford University Press. ISBN 9780199063215.
- Boivin, Michel (2012). Le soufisme antinomien dans le sous-continent indien. La'l Shahbâz Qalandar et sa tradition. Paris: Les Editions du Cerf.
- Boivin, Michel (2013). L'âghâ khân et les khojah. Islam chiite et dynamiques sociales dans le sous-continent indien (1843-1954). Karthala: Coll. Terres et Gens d'islam. ISBN 9782811109585.
- Boivin, Michel (2015). Historical Dictionary of the Sufi Culture of Sindh in Pakistan and in India. Karachi: Oxford University Press.
- Boivin, Michel (2015). Le Pakistan et l'islam. Anthropologie d'une république islamique. Paris: Téraèdre. ISBN 9782336376011.
- Boivin, Michel, with Rémy Delage (eds) (2016), Devotional Islam in South Asia. Shrines, journeys and wanderers, New York and Oxon, Routledge.
- Boivin, Michel, Matthew Cook and Julien Levesque (2017), Discovering Sindh’s Past. Selections from the Journal of the Sind Historical Society, 1934–1948, Edited by, Karachi, Oxford University Press.
- Boivin, Michel (2019).The Hindu Sufis of South Asia. Partition, Shrine Culture and the Sindhis of India, London, I. B. Tauris.
- Boivin, Michel (2021). Histoire de l'Inde. Collection Que sais-Je?. Vol. 489 (7th ed.). Presses universitaires de France. ISBN 9782130552123.
- Boivin, Michel (2021). The Sufi Paradigm and the Makings of Vernacular Knowledge in Colonial India: The Case of Sindh (1851-1929), New York, Palgrave McMillan.
- Boivin, Michel, with Manoël Pénicaud (Eds)(2023), Inter-religious Practices and Saint Veneration in the Muslim World. Khidr/Khizr from the Middle East to South Asia, London and New York, Routledge.
- Boivin, Michel (2024), Devotion, Religious Authority and Social Structures in Sindh: Khojas, Vaniyos and Faqirs, Leiden and New York, Brill Publisher.
- Boivin, Michel (2024), An Anthology of Sindhi Sufi Poetry as preserved by the Sindhis of India, translated and introduced by Charu Gidwani and, Edited by Rohitesh Gidwani, Ulhasnagar, Adviksham Publisher.

=== Chapters and papers ===
Forthcoming | With Nandita Bhavnani, “The Sindhis and their darbars: Mumbai as a hub of Sindhi resilience through spirituality”, in Kamlesh Mohan ed., The Uprooted People: Uncovering Stories of Compassion, Resilience, and Healing. Delhi: Primus Book.

2024 | “The Material Culture of Sufism: A Preliminary Catalogue of data collected in Sehwan Sharif (Sindh, Pakistan)”, in Roberto Tottoli (ed.), Volume in Memory of Professor Alberto Ventura, Napoli: The Orientale University.

2024 | “The Sikhs in Pakistan”, Brill’s Encyclopedia of Sikhism, ed. Knut Jakobsen.

2023 | with Trisha Lalchandani, “Everyday Religiosity among the Hindu Sindhis of India: Sindhi Identity and the Religious Market in the Era of Social Networks”, in Farhana Ibrahim ed. Everyday Belief and the Practice of Being Modern: Religious Studies in India, New Delhi, Oxford University Press, pp. 153–173.

2023 | “Khwaja Khizr in Iconographic Translation: The Changing Visual Idiom of a Complex Figure from South Asia,” in Michel Boivin and Manoël Pénicaud (Eds), Inter-religious Practices and Saint Veneration in the Muslim World. Khidr/Khizr from the Middle East to South Asia, London and New York, Routledge, 2023, pp. 84–103.

2023 | with Manoël Pénicaud, “Introduction to Khidr-Khizr. A Figure of Shared Legacy in a World of Religious Boundaries”, in Michel Boivin and Manoël Pénicaud (Eds), Inter-religious Practices and Saint Veneration in the Muslim World. Khidr/Khizr from the Middle East to South Asia, London and New York, Routledge, 2023, pp. 4–17.

2023 | “Regions and Regional Traditions. Pakistan: Sindh”, Brill’s Encyclopedia of Hinduism, ed. Knut Jakobsen, Volume VII: Supplement, Brill, Leiden – Boston, pp. 3–16.

2023 | “Ethnography of the dhago. Material Culture and the Performance of Devotion in South Asia”, in Giovani di Zorzi and Thomas Dahnhardt (eds), Journey among the Dervishes between Past and Present, Milano, Mimesis International, pp. 127–151.

2023 | « ginan », « Jhulelal », « Latif, Shah Abd al- », « marsiya », « mirasi », « Sami », Dictionnaire Encyclopédique de l’Inde, Paris, Editions Garnier.

2023 | avec Jyoti Garin, “Littérature sindhie. Sindhi adab », Dictionnaire Encyclopédique de l’Inde, Paris, Editions Garnier.

2022 | with Masooma Shakir, Suneela Ahmed, and Fahmida Shaikh, “Indus River and Cultural Heritage. Commemoration of Three Sites in Sindh” Handbook of Waterfront Cities and Urbanism, Edited By Mohammed Rahman, New York, Routledge, pp. 58–74.

- 2021 | "Sufism and the Hindus of Sindh", in Saaz Aggarwal (ed.), Sindhi Tapestry. Reflections on the Sindhi Identity: An Anthology, Pune, Black-And-White Fountain, 2022, pp. 215–222.
- 2021 |"Pakistan: Introduction", in Brill Encyclopedia of Religions of Indigenous People in South Asia, edited by Marine Carrin, Leiden-Boston: Brill, pp. 847–861.
- 2021 |"Religions among the Indigenous People of Sindh", in Brill Encyclopedia of Religions of Indigenous People in South Asia, edited by Marine Carrin, Leiden-Boston, Brill, pp. 872–884.
- 2021 |"Kalash religion", in Brill Encyclopedia of Religions of Indigenous People in South Asia, edited by Marine Carrin, Leiden-Boston, Brill, pp. 897–905.
- 2021 |« Histoire du chiisme ismaélien », in Minorités en Islam, islam en minorité, Paris, IISMM/Diacritiques Editions, pp. 45–56.
- 2021 |"Religion and Society in Pakistan: From Pīr’s Domination to Individual Connected Piety", Routledge Handbook of South Asian Religions, Edited By Knut A. Jacobsen, London and New York, Routledge, pp. 287–299.
- 2021 |"Sufism and Vernacular Knowledge in Sindh", Routledge Handbook of Sufism, Edited By Lloyd Rigeon, London and New York, Routledge, pp. 461–473.
- 2020 |« Bodies & Artefacts. Relics and Other Devotional Supports in Shiʿa Societies in the Indic and Iranian Worlds. An Introduction », with Annabelle Collinet and Sepideh Parsapajouh, Journal of the Material Culture in the Muslim World (Brill Publisher), Vol. 1 – n°2, Guest editor with Sepideh Parsapajouh and Annabelle Collinet: "Bodies and Artefacts in the Muslim World", pp. 187–194.
- 2020 |"The Polyvalent Qadamgāh Imām ʿAlī in Hyderabad, Sindh: A Preliminary Study in Relics, Political Power, and Community Setup", Journal of the Material Culture in the Muslim World (Brill Publisher), Vol. 1 – n°2, Guest editor with Sepideh Parsapajouh and Annabelle Collinet: "Bodies and Artefacts in the Muslim World", pp. 243–262.
- 2019 « Ritual Displacements as process of constructing and deconstructing boundaries in a Sufi pilgrimage of Pakistan », in C. Bergmann and J. Schaflechner, Ritual Journeys in South Asia. Constellations and Contestations of Mobility and Space, London & New York, Routledge, pp. 118–138.
- 2019 | « Etre fakir à Sehwan Sharif (Pakistan) », in Adeline Herrou (dir.), Une journée dans une vie, une vie dans une journée. Des ascètes et des moines aujourd'hui, Paris, PUF, pp. 127–144.
- «Khwaja Khiẓr et le Sindhu (Indus) : archéologie d’une figure sacrée du Sindh à identités multiples », in Sur les chemins d’Onagre. Histoire et archéologie orientales. Hommage à Monik Kervran, édité par Claire Hardy-Guilbert, Hélène Renel, Axelle Rougeulle et Eric Vallet, Oxford, Archaeopress Publishing Ltd, 2018, pp. 3–14.
- and Bhavna Rajpal, 2018, « From Udero Lal in Sindh to Ulhasnagar in Maharashtra: Partition and Memories Across Borders in the Tradition of Jhulelal », in Churnjeet Mahn · Anne Murphy Editors, Partition and the Practice of Memory, Palgrave MacMillan, pp. 43–62.
- "Authority, Shrines and Spaces: Scrutinizing Devotional Islam from South Asia", in Michel Boivin and Rémy Delage (eds.), Devotional Islam in Contemporary South Asia: Shrines, Journeys and Wanderers, New Delhi, Routledge, 2016, pp. 1–11.
- "The New Elite and the Issue of Sufism: A Journey from Vedanta to Theosophy in Colonial Sindh», in Dr Muhammad Ali Shaikh (compiled by), Sindh Through the century II. Proceedings of the Second International Seminar Held in Karachi in March 2014 by Sindh Madressatul Islam University, Karachi, Karachi, SMI University Press, 2015, pp. 215–231.
- "The Saint as Ancestor in some Sufi and Ismaili Communities of the Sindhi Area", in C. Mayeur-Jaouen & A. Papas (eds.), Family Portraits with Saints. Hagiography, Sanctity, and Family in the Muslim World, Berlin, Klaus Schwarz Verlag, 2014, pp. 327–341.
- "Les Khojah et la construction de la communauté ismaélienne dans la période contemporaine : Invention de la tradition et communauté imaginée", dans Nicole Khouri et Joanna Pereira Leite (dir.), Khojas Ismaïli. Du Mozambique à la.globalisation, Paris, L'Harmattan, 2014, pp. 317–337.
- "The Isma'ili – Isna 'Ashari Divide Among the Khojas: Exploring Forgotten Judicial Data from Karachi", Journal of the Royal Asiatic Society, Volume 24 / Issue 03 / July 2014, pp. 381 – 396.
- "Music and Remembrance as Meditation: Samâ' in the Indus Valley", in Halvor Eifring (ed.), Meditation in Judaism, Christianity and Islam. Cultural Histories, London, Bloomsbury, 2013, pp. 214–224.
- "Murshid Mulan Shâh (1883–1962): A Sufi Itinerary from Sehwan Sharif in Pakistan to Haridwar in India", Oriente Moderno, XCII, 2012, 2, p. 291–312.
- "Compétition religieuse et culture partagée dans les lieux saints complexes d'Asie du sud", in Isabelle Depret et Guillaume Dye (dir.), Partage du sacré : transferts, cultes mixtes, rivalités interconfessionnelles, Bruxelles, Editions EME, 2012, pp. 149–165.
- "L'islam, l’Etat et les ulémas dans la république islamique du Pakistan. Un bras de fer de plus d’un demi-siècle", in Christophe Jaffrelot et Aminah Mohammad-Arif, Politique et religions en Asie du sud. Le sécularisme dans tous ses états ? Paris, Editions de l’EHESS, 2012, pp. 69–92.
- "The Sufi Centre of Jhok Sharif in Pakistan (Sindh): Questioning the ziyarat as a social process", in C. Bennett & Ch. Ramsey (ed.), South Asian Sufis: Devotion, Deviation and Destiny, Delhi, Continuum Books, 2012, pp. 95–109.
- "Devotional Literature and Sufism in the light of Nabi Bakhsh Baloch’s contribution", Journal of the Pakistan Historical Society, Vol. IX, n°4, 2011, pp. 13–22.
- "Karachi: rivalités ethniques, affrontements sectaires et compétitions politiques", in Béatrice Giblin (dir.), Les conflits dans le monde. Approche géopolitique, Armand Colin, collection U, 2011, pp. 59–67.
- "Le qalandar et le shâh: les savoirs fakirs et leur impact sur la société du Sud Pakistan", Archives des Sciences Sociales des Religions, n°154, 2011, pp. 101–120.

== Sources ==
- Michel Boivin profile at EHESS
- Michel Boivin profile at the Institute for Ismaili Studies
- "Islam and Europe: 'We're Muslim, get over it'". The Express Tribune. Pakistan. 18 November 2011.
