= Ford Explorer EV =

Battery electric compact crossover SUV

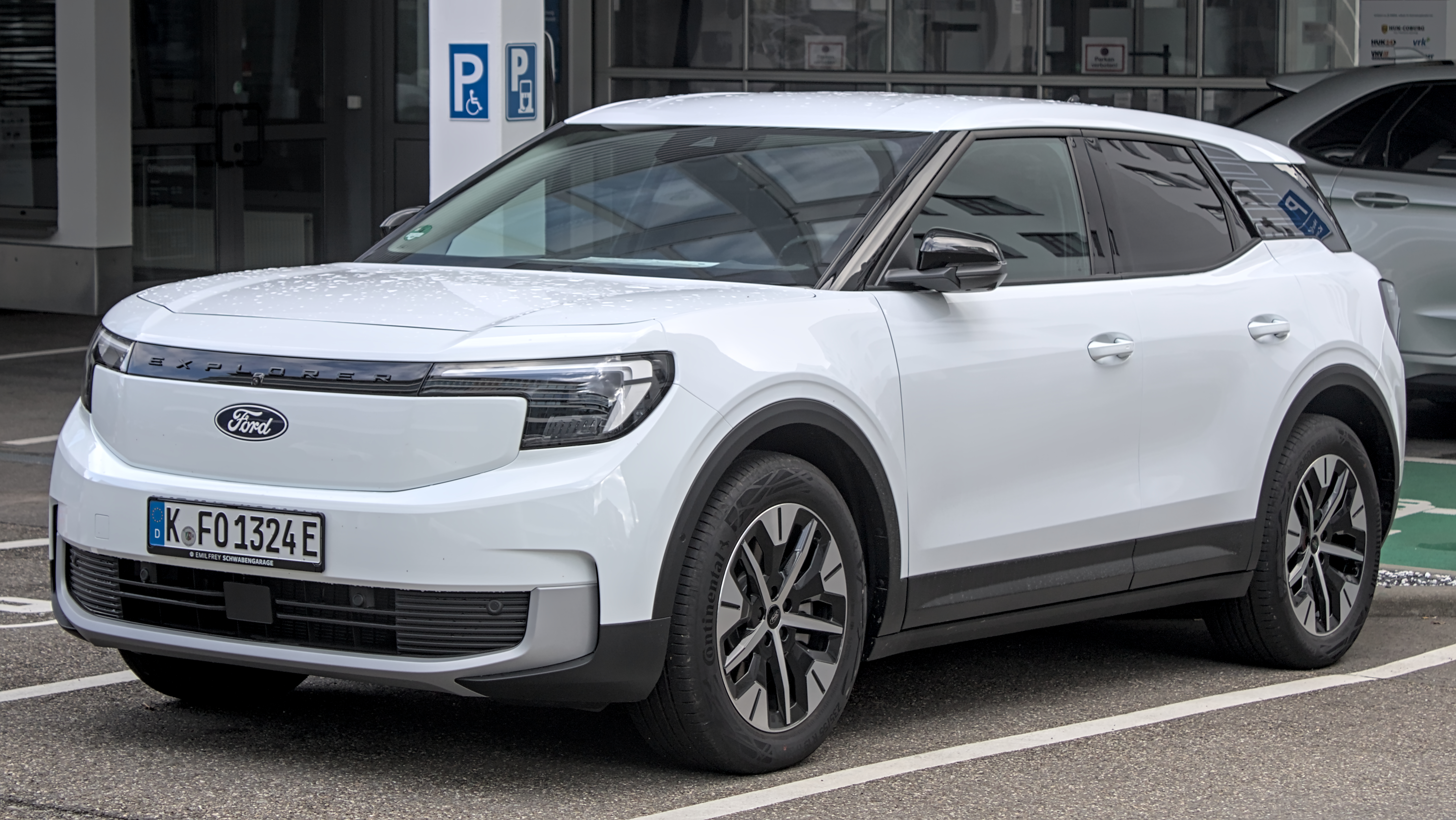

Overview
- Manufacturer: Ford
- Model code: CX740
- Production: June 2024 – present
- Assembly: Germany: Cologne (Cologne Body & Assembly)
- Designer: Jordan Demkiw (exterior design manager); Amko Leenarts (head of design); Liviu Tudoran (senior designer); Robert Engelmann (senior interior designer)

Body and chassis
- Class: Compact crossover SUV (C)
- Body style: 5-door SUV
- Layout: Rear-motor, rear-wheel-drive; Dual-motor, all-wheel-drive
- Platform: Volkswagen Group MEB
- Related: Ford Capri EV; Volkswagen ID.4/ID.5; Škoda Enyaq; Audi Q4 e-tron

Powertrain
- Electric motor: APP 310 permanent magnet synchronous (to April 2026); APP 350 permanent magnet synchronous (from April 2026); APP 550 permanent magnet synchronous
- Battery: 55 kWh lithium-ion; 82 kWh lithium-ion
- Range: 346–522 km (215–324 mi) (WLTP)

Dimensions
- Wheelbase: 2,770 mm (109.1 in)
- Length: 4,460 mm (175.6 in)
- Width: 1,870 mm (73.6 in)
- Height: 1,600 mm (63.0 in)
- Kerb weight: 2,391 kg (5,271 lb)

The Ford Explorer EV is a battery electric compact crossover SUV (C-segment) produced by Ford through its European operations. Produced in the Cologne Body & Assembly in Germany and marketed mainly in Europe, the vehicle is based on the Volkswagen Group MEB platform, and uses a Volkswagen-supplied powertrain. The vehicle shares its name and design inspiration with the larger SUV produced in the US, which is chosen by Ford "as a nod to our American heritage".

The Explorer EV was planned to be available to order from September 2023, with the first units originally slated for arrival by December of the same year. In August 2023, Ford announced the Explorer EV launch would be pushed back to 2024, due to new battery regulations. Production at the Cologne plant started in June 2024.

== Overview ==
The Explorer EV was revealed on 21 March 2023. Built on the same MEB platform as the Volkswagen ID.4, the vehicle is the result of an ongoing partnership between the two brands, which has included sharing commercial vehicles. It is produced in the Cologne plant in Germany, which previously manufactured the Fiesta small car.

The design of the Explorer EV was done under the direction of lead designer Jordan Demkiw. During its introduction, Ford stated the vehicle combines "German engineering" with the brand's "iconic American SUV design". Compared to the ID.4, Ford designers were able to create a shorter rear section, move the A-pillars further rearward, and use a wider track. To ensure the Explorer EV "drives like a Ford", Demkiw stated that the vehicle received different dampers, tyres, and suspension tuning compared to its Volkswagen counterpart. Ford specifically picked the length of the vehicle halfway between the Volkswagen ID.3 and ID.4, to avoid direct competition with both models.

In the interior, the Explorer EV is available with an adjustable 14.6-inch portrait display running Ford's Sync Move software, which allows for full-screen mapping and access to all the smartphone connectivity options. The angle of the screen is adjustable in 20 stages by up to 30 degrees for easier usage and to avoid glare. The Explorer EV also features a 5.0-inch floating digital instrument display that offers driving data, battery charge levels, and driver assistance status.

The boot of the Explorer EV offers an integrated parcel shelf that moves with the tailgate for easier access. The luggage space is rated at 450 L (15.9 cu ft), or 1,400 L (49.4 cu ft) with the rear seats folded.

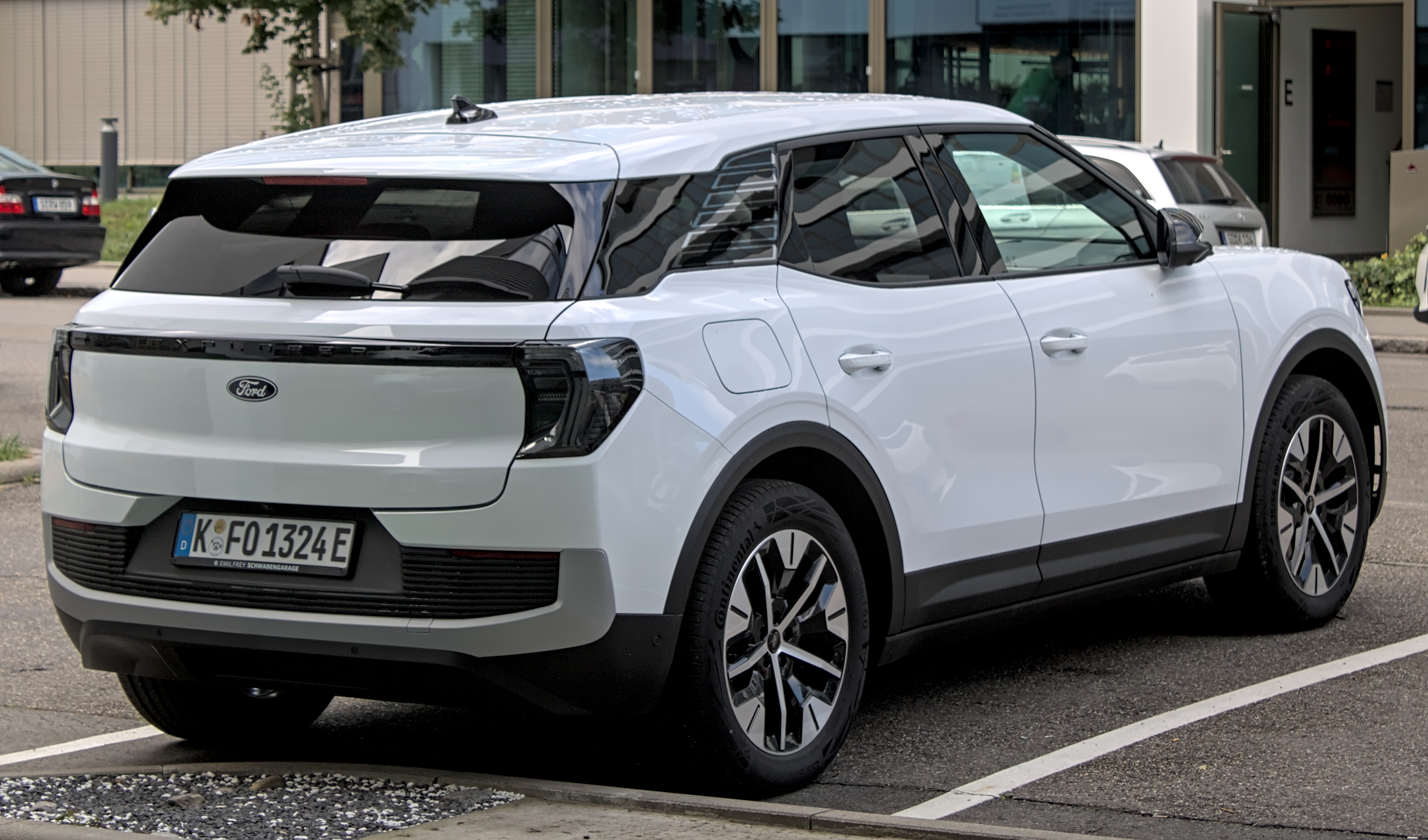
Rear view

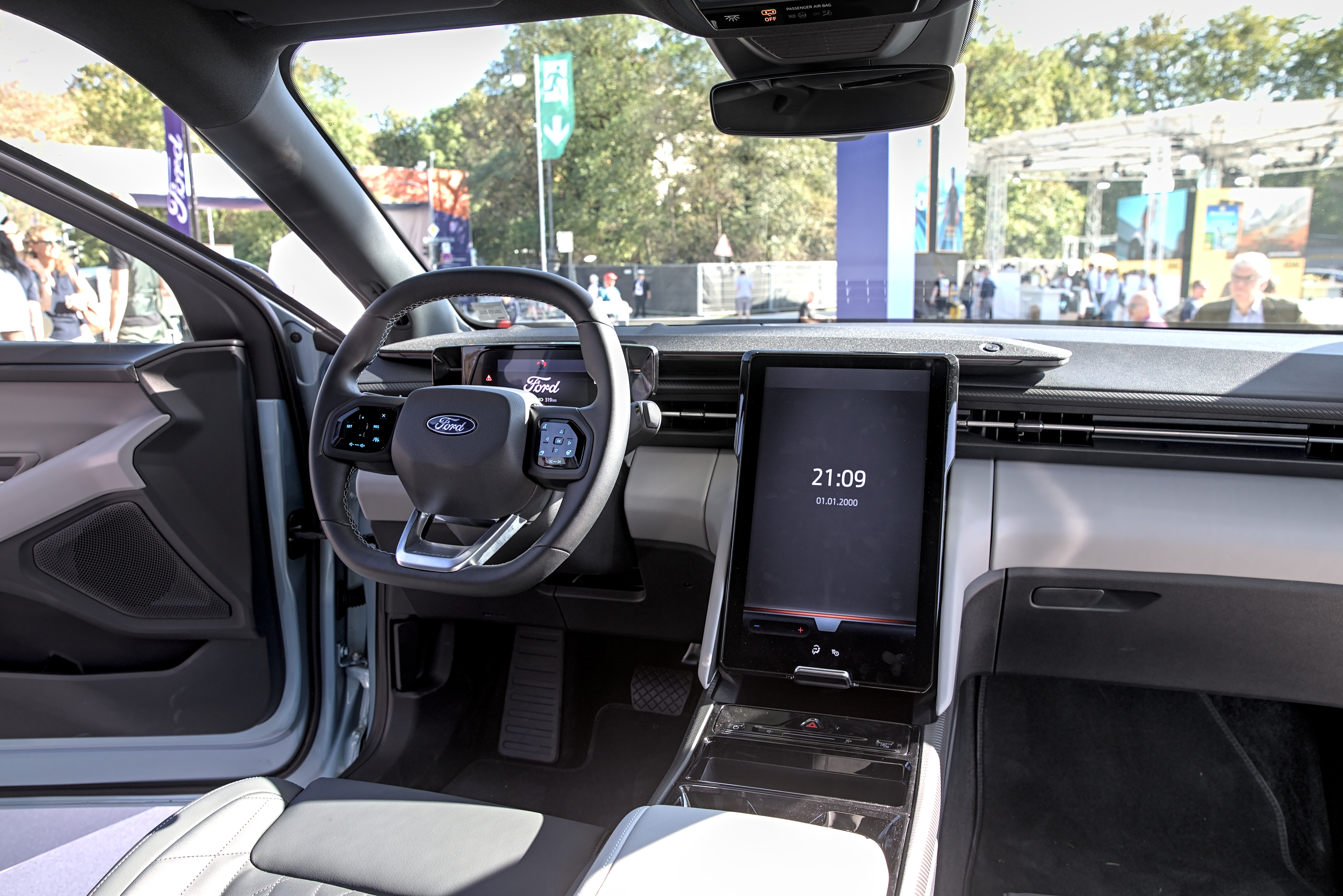
Interior

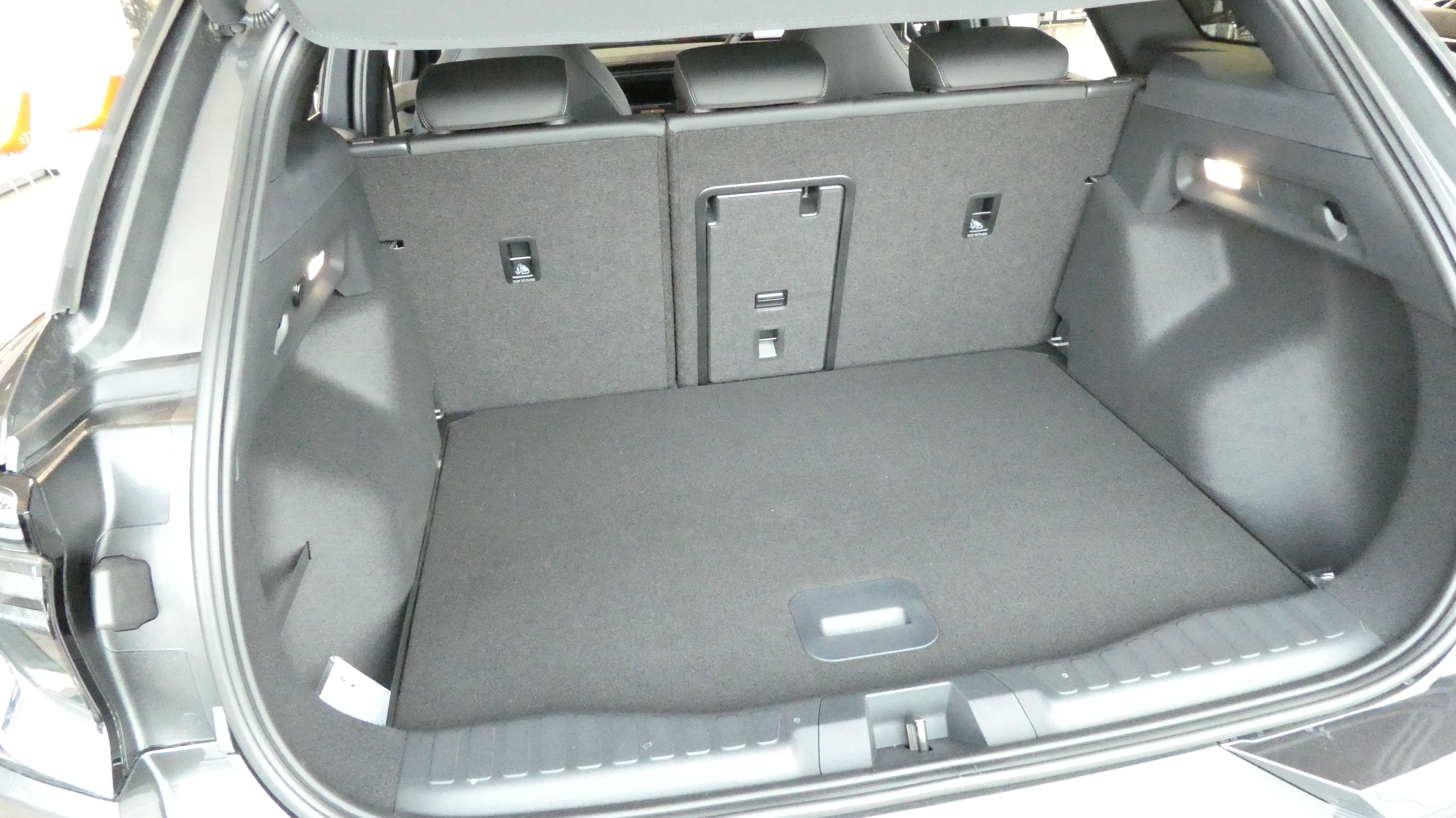
Cargo area

== Details ==
The options for the Explorer EV start with a rear-wheel-drive version which is rated at 168 bhp (170 PS; 125 kW) of horsepower. It is equipped with a Volkswagen-supplied 55 kWh (52 kWh usable) battery with an estimated range of up to 350 km (217 mi). Other options include a more powerful single-motor model with 282 bhp (286 PS; 210 kW), featuring a larger 82 kWh (77 kWh usable) battery that is rated at around 540 km (336 mi) in a single charge. This model also has a maximum charging speed of 170 kW. The flagship model Explorer EV has dual motors with a combined 335 bhp (340 PS; 250 kW), with the same battery and charging capabilities as the mid-range model. The most expensive model is capable of 490 km (304 mi) of range with towing capability rated at 1,400 kg (3,086 lb). All models are capable of fast charging from 10 to 80 percent in about 25 minutes. The available wheel sizes are 19, 20, and 21 inches.

The Ford Explorer was revised in April 2026, in keeping with similar developments on the related Volkswagen Group MEB vehicles. The APP 310 electric motor was replaced with the updated APP 350 motor for the Standard Range models, the new motor is combined with a new 62 kWh lithium iron phosphate battery replacing the 55 kWh battery. The new motor increases power from 168 bhp (170 PS; 125 kW) to 187 bhp (190 PS; 139 kW) and torque from 310 N⋅m (229 lb⋅ft) to 350 N⋅m (258 lb⋅ft). The Extended Range model retains the more powerful APP 550 electric motor, with the All Wheel Drive variant similarly retaining the combination of APP 550 motor on the rear axle and AKA 150 motor on the front axle. The Extended Range and All Wheel Drive models saw increases in their towing capacity to 1,200 kg (2,646 lb) and 1,800 kg (3,968 lb) respectively. One pedal driving and Vehicle-to-grid options were introduced, as was a new Android Automotive based infotainment system.

== Marketing ==
To promote the launch of the Explorer EV in Europe, Ford has announced that the vehicle will embark on a journey around the world, led by influencer Lexie Alford, who holds the record for the youngest person to visit every country of the world.

== Safety ==
Euro NCAP test results Ford Explorer EV (LHD) (2024)
Test	Points	%
Overall:	5 /5 stars	
Adult occupant:	35.7	89%
Child occupant:	42.2	86%
Pedestrian:	50.7	80%
Safety assist:	13.1	72%
