= Ford Capri (disambiguation) =

Ford Capri is a coupé produced by Ford of Europe from 1969 to 1986

Ford Capri is also used for seven different Ford or Lincoln-Mercury cars:

- Ford Consul Capri, a coupé produced by Ford of Britain between 1961 and 1964
- Ford Capri (Australia), a convertible car produced by the Ford Motor Company of Australia from 1989 to 1994 and also sold in the US as a Mercury Capri from 1991 to 1994
- Ford Capri EV, a compact crossover SUV produced by Ford Europe from 2024
- Lincoln Cosmopolitan Capri, produced from 1950 to 1951
- Lincoln Capri, produced from 1952 to 1959
- Mercury Comet Capri, produced from 1966 to 1967
- Mercury Capri, produced in three generations from 1970 to 1978, 1979 to 1986 and 1991 to 1994
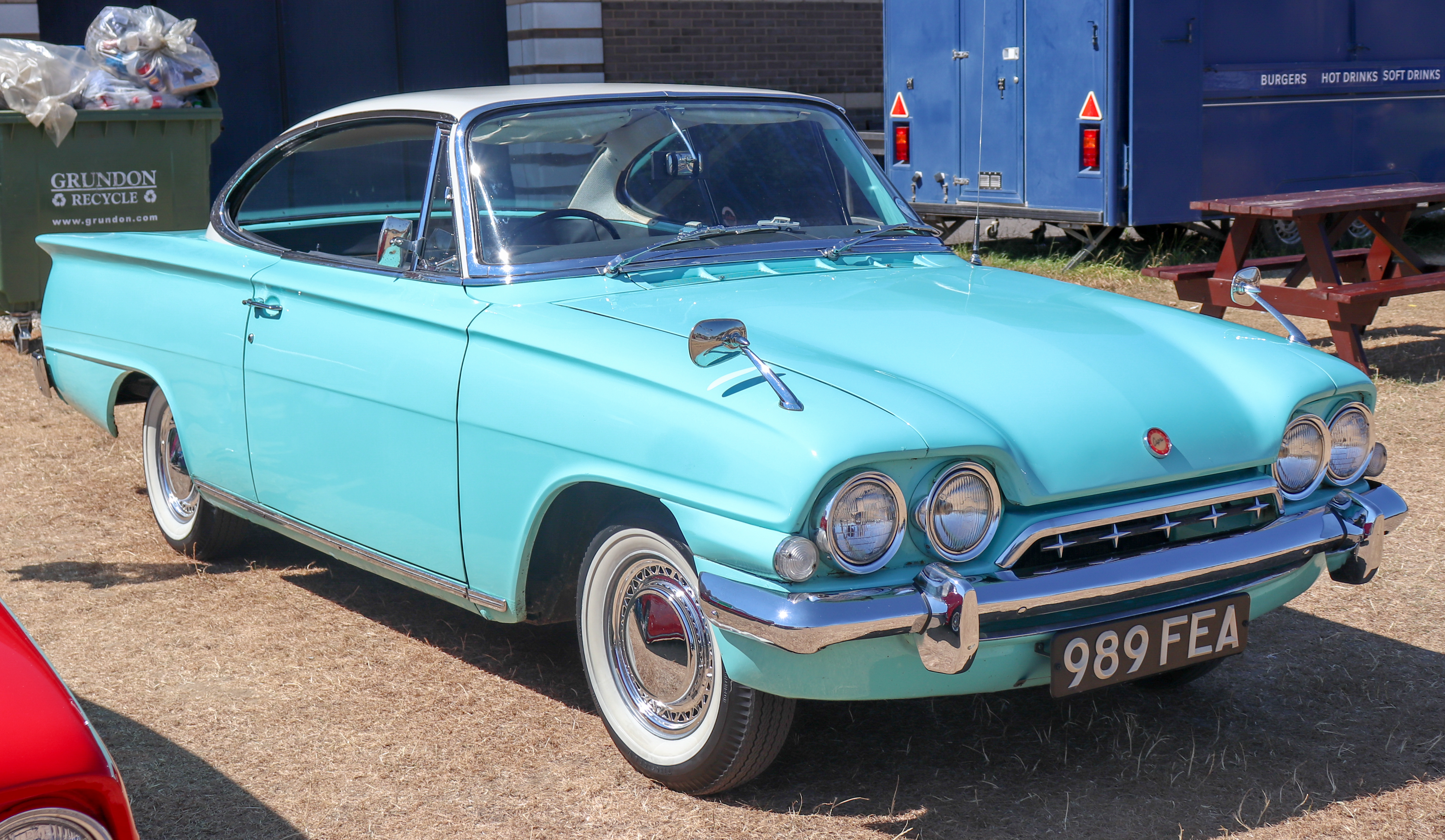
1961–1964 Ford Capri

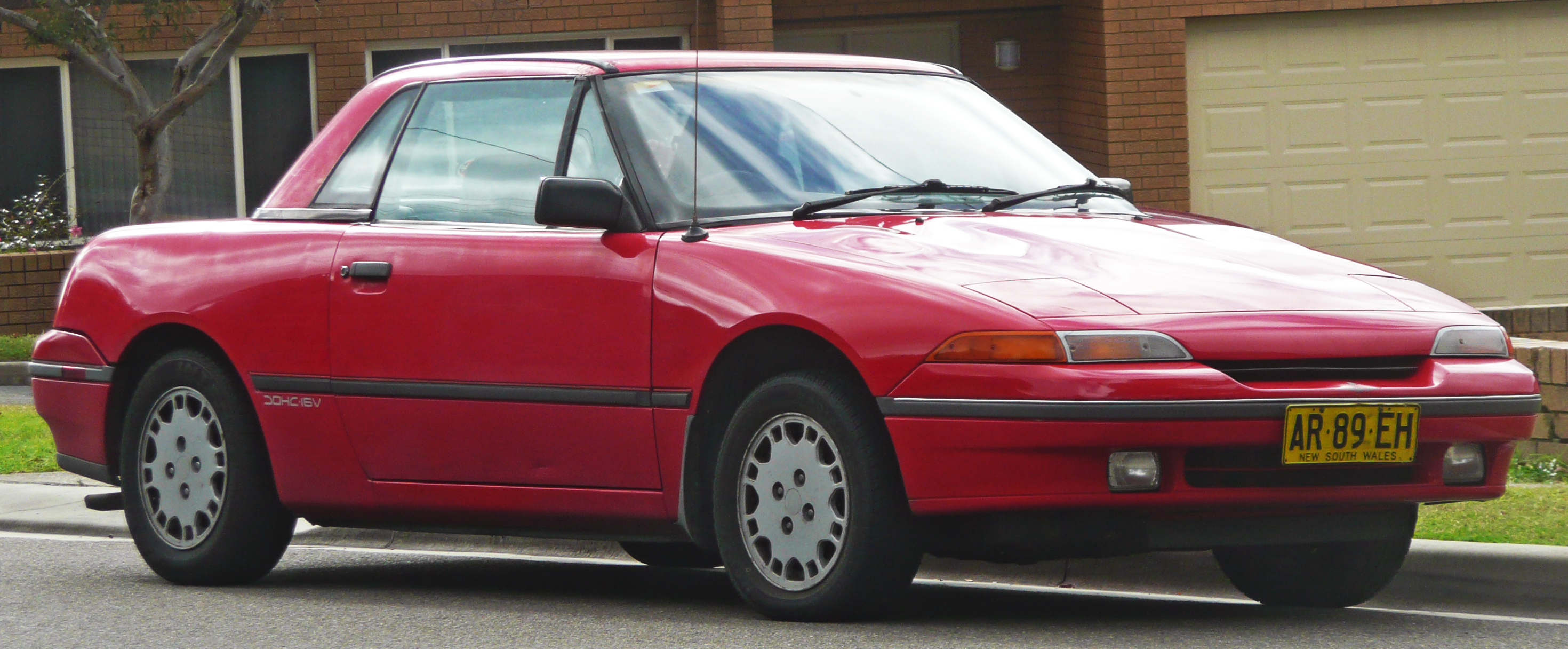
1989–1994 Ford Capri

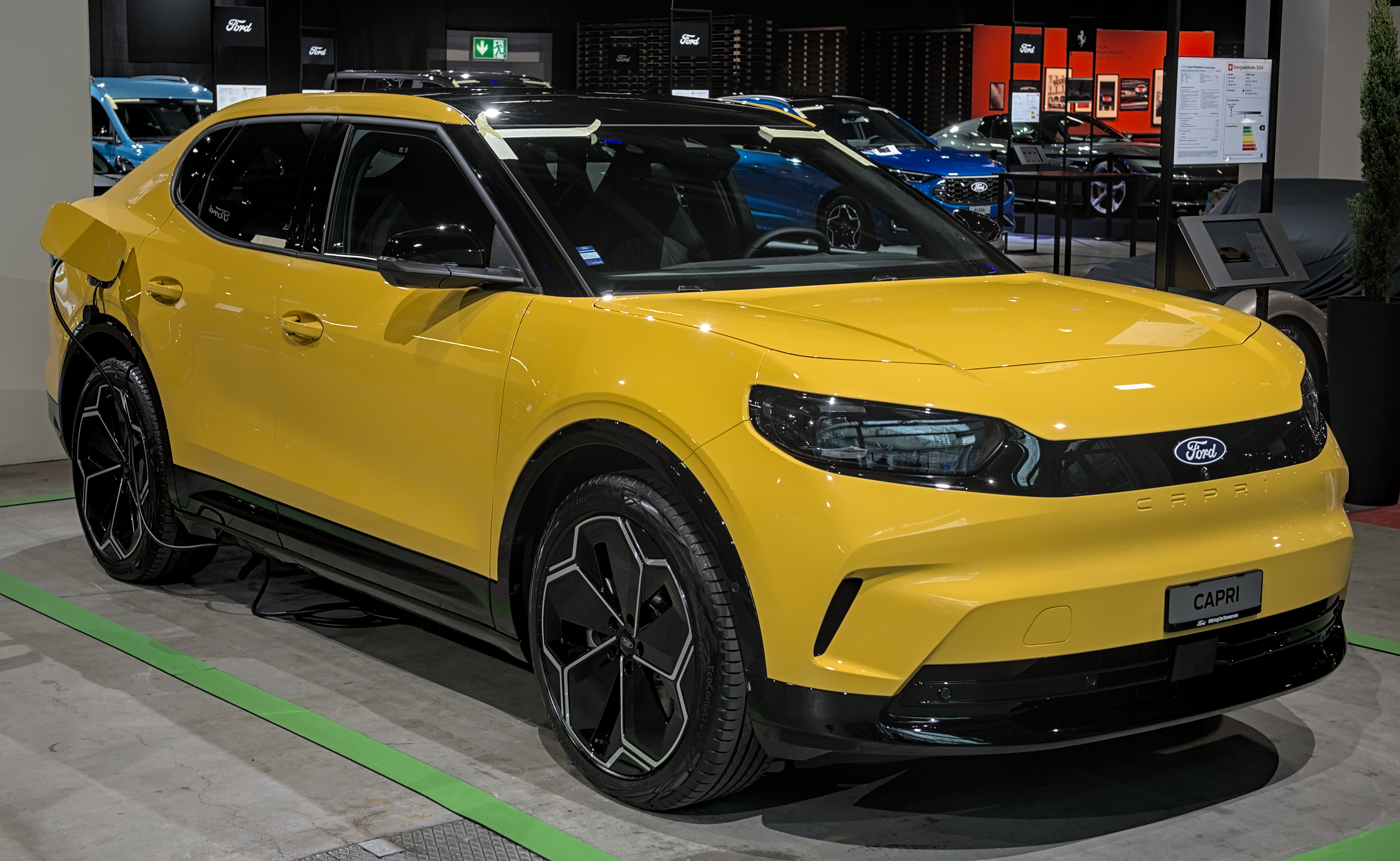
2024–present Ford Capri

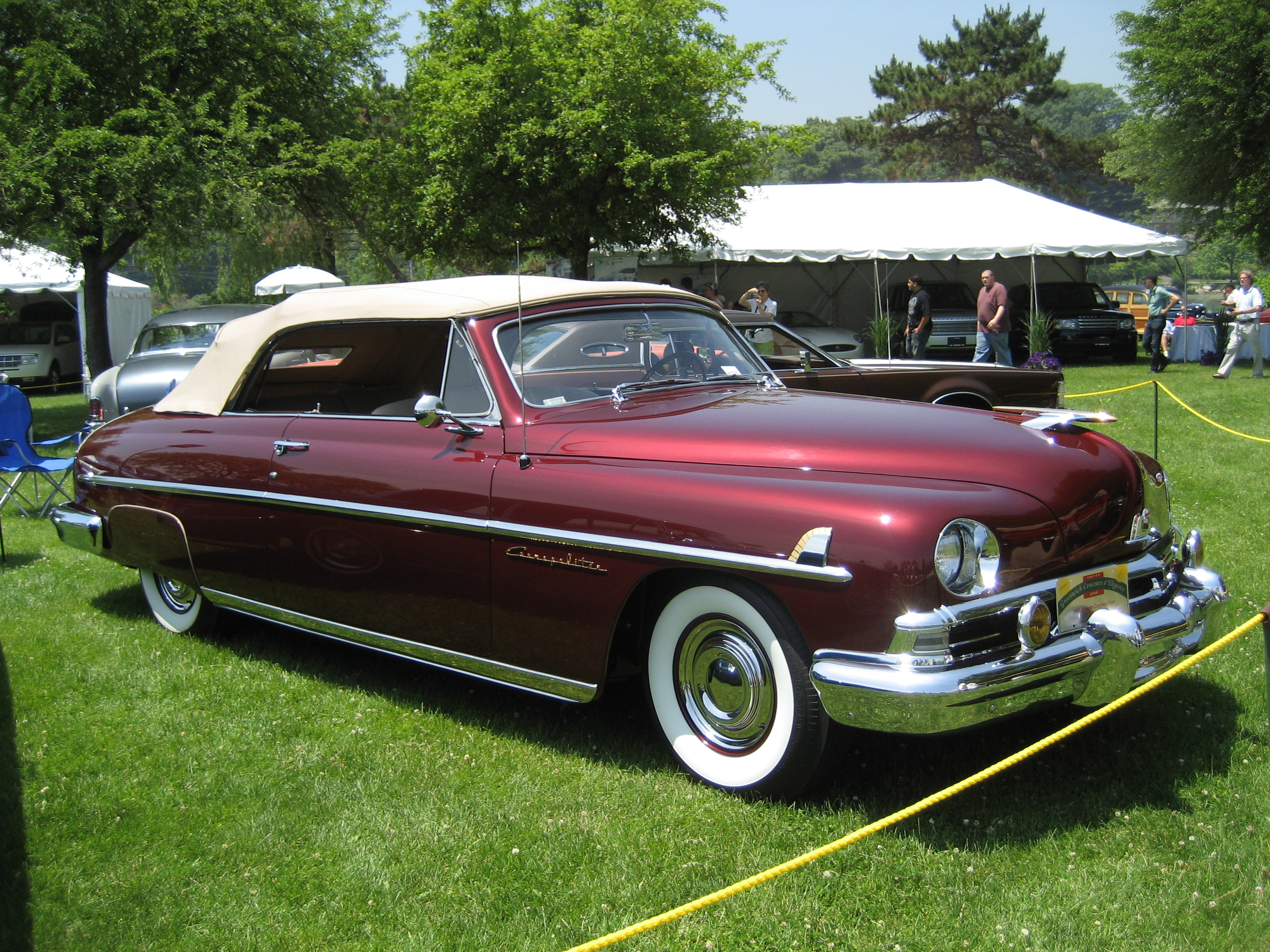
1950–1951 Lincoln Cosmpolitan Capri

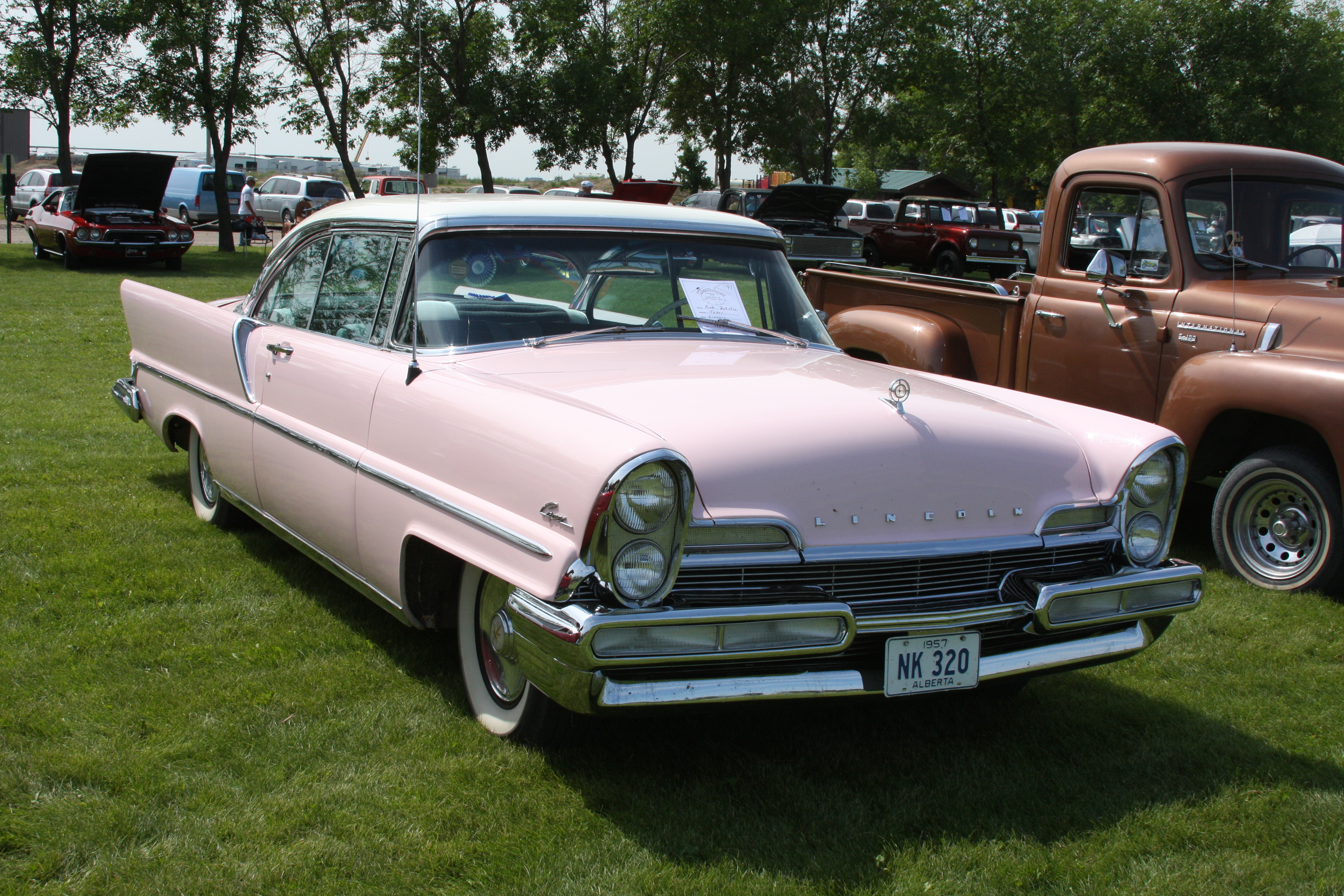
1952–1959 Lincoln Capri

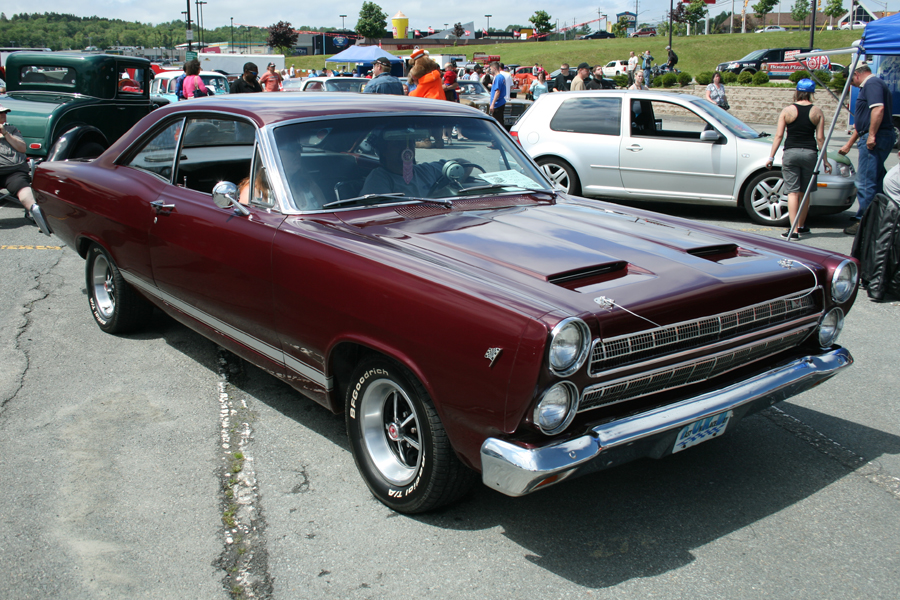
1966–1967 Mercury Comet Capri

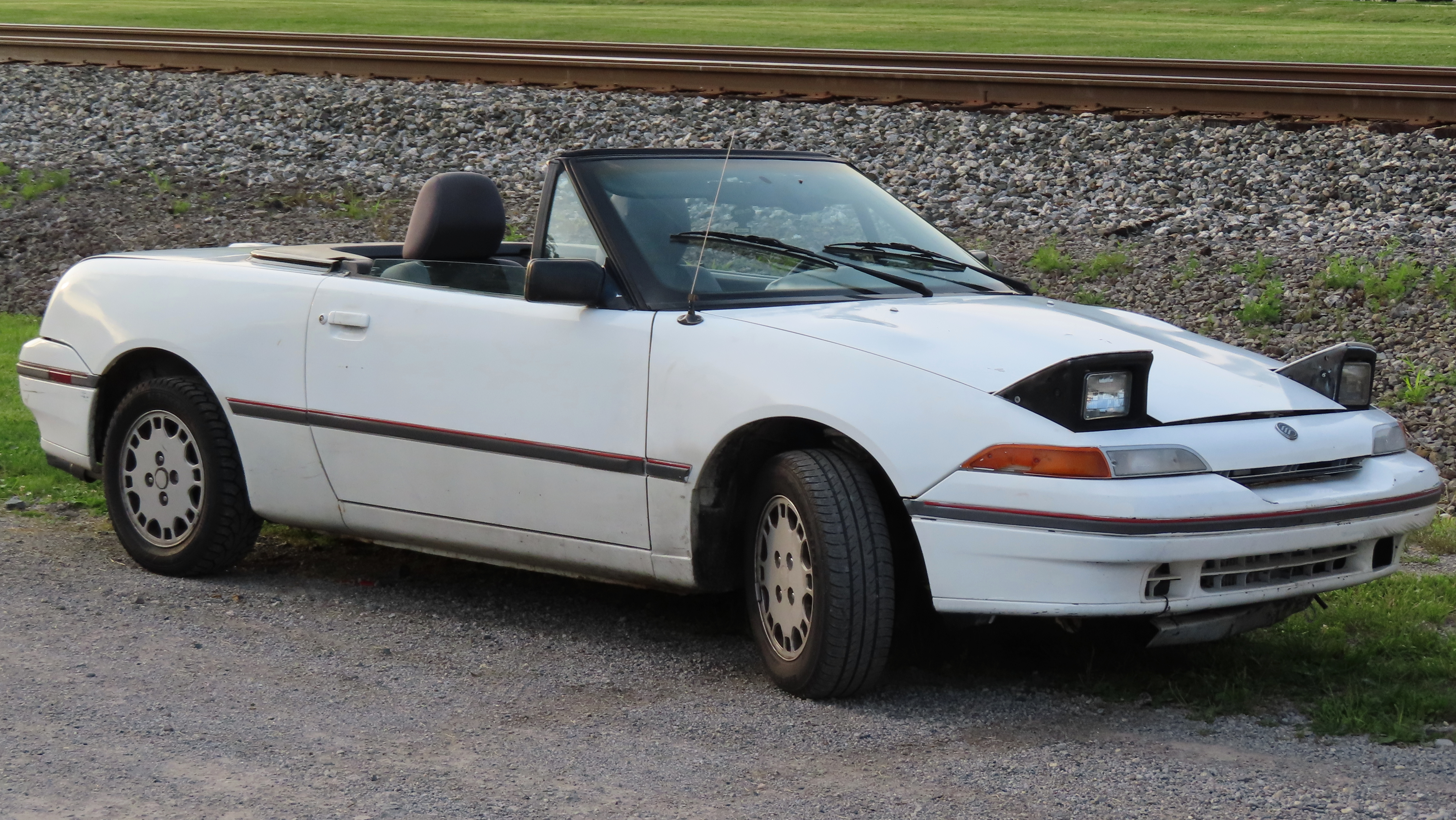
1970–1994 Mercury Capri
