= Cologne Body & Assembly =

Ford automobile factory in Germany

Coordinates: 51.00252°N 6.95141°E

Cologne Body & Assembly is an automobile manufacturing plant owned by the Ford Motor Company and located in the Niehl quarter, Nippes district of Cologne, Germany. This factory is not to be confused with the smaller development and spare parts center to the north, in Merkenich, part of Chorweiler district.

The facility spans 628,500 square feet (14.43 acres) and has approximately 3,530 employees as of 2026. It has manufactured the Fiesta (1976–2023) and Ford's B-class MPV, the Fusion (2002-2012).

From 2024, the all-electric European Ford Explorer EV will be built based on the Volkswagen Group MEB platform. The former engine plant in Cologne was transformed into an EV battery assembly line.

== Produced vehicles ==
Model	Years	Number produced
Model A	1931–1932	1200
Trucks (Model AA, Model BB, V8-51, Model BB, G917/987, B3000, V3000S, Rhein, Ruhr, FK 2000 - FK 4500)	1931–1961	200000
Rheinland	1932–1936	7400
Köln	1933–1936	11000
V8	1932–1941	18000
Taunus Transit	1953–1965	256000
Eifel	1935–1940	61500
Taunus (7 generations)	1939–1942; 1948–1971	3200000
Capri (3 generations)	1968–1986	1400000
Granada/Consul (2 generations)	1972–1985	1600000
Fiesta (8 generations)	1979–2023	9900000 (as of Oct 2022)
Scorpio (2 generations)	1985–1999	860000
Puma	1997–2001	129000
Fusion	2002–2012	812000
Explorer EV	2024–	
Capri EV	2024–	

== See also ==
- List of Ford factories
