= Rule of Saint Benedict =

Book of monastic precepts written in 516

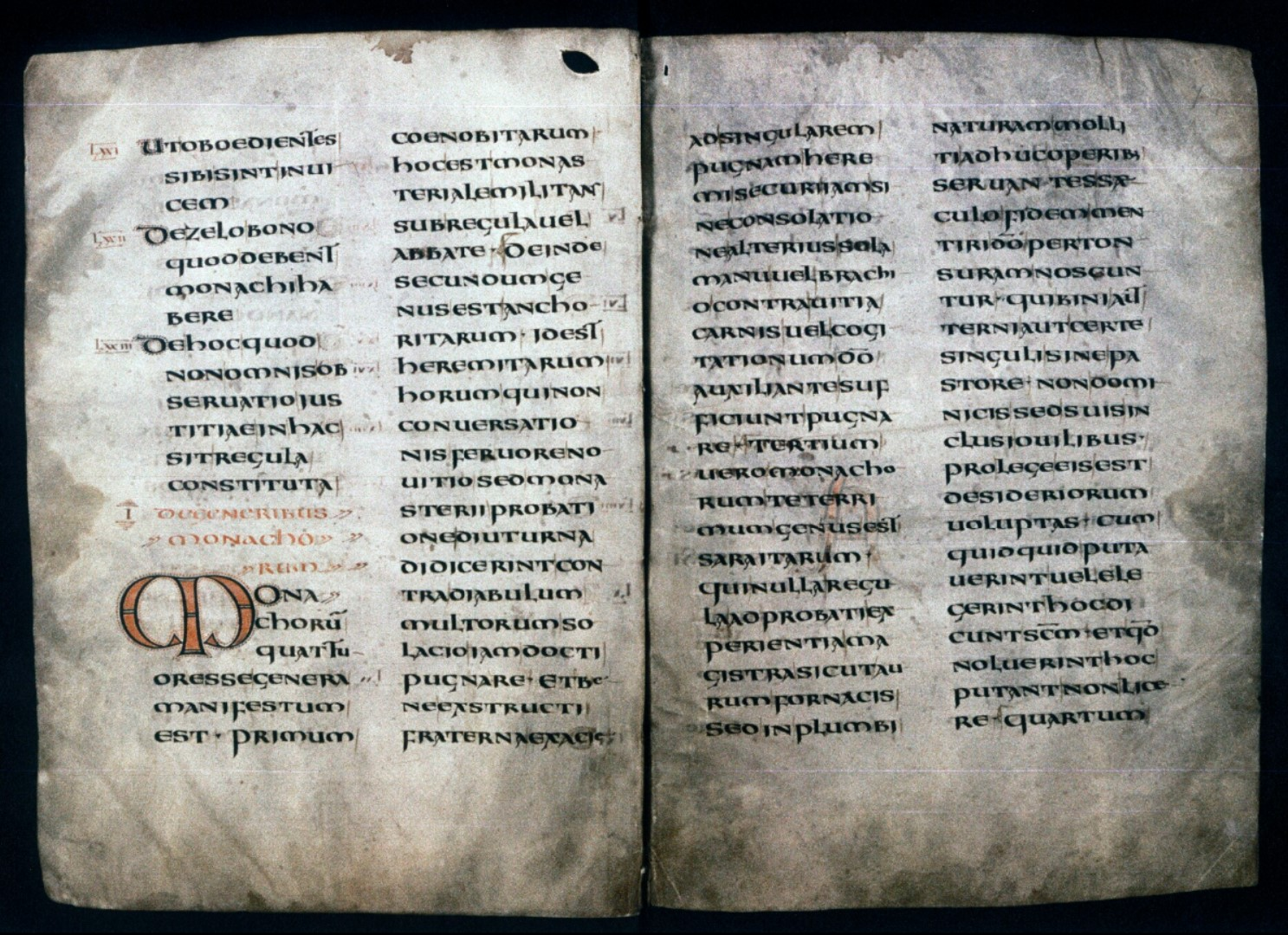
The oldest copy of the Rule of Saint Benedict, from the 8th century (Oxford, Bodleian Library, MS. Hatton 48, fols. 6v–7r)

The Rule of Saint Benedict (Latin: Regula Sancti Benedicti) is a book of precepts written in Latin c. 530 by St. Benedict of Nursia (c. 480 – c. 550) for monks living communally under the authority of an abbot.

The spirit of Saint Benedict's Rule is summed up in the motto of the Benedictine Confederation: pax ("peace") and the traditional ora et labora ("pray and work"). Compared to other precepts, the Rule provides a moderate path between individual zeal and formulaic institutionalism; because of this middle ground, it has been widely popular. Benedict's concerns were his views of the needs of monks in a community environment: namely, to establish due order, to foster an understanding of the relational nature of human beings, and to provide a spiritual father to support and strengthen the individual's ascetic effort and the spiritual growth that is required for the fulfillment of the human vocation, theosis.

The Rule of Saint Benedict has been used by Benedictines for 15 centuries, and thus St Benedict is sometimes regarded as the founder of Western monasticism due to the reforming influence that his rules had on the contemporary Catholic hierarchy. There is, however, no evidence to suggest that Benedict intended to found a religious order in the modern sense, and it was not until the Late Middle Ages that mention was made of an "Order of Saint Benedict". His Rule was written as a guide for individual, autonomous communities: all Benedictine Houses (and the Congregations in which they have grouped themselves) still remain self-governing. Advantages seen in retaining this unique Benedictine emphasis on autonomy include cultivating models of tightly-bonded communities and contemplative lifestyles. Perceived disadvantages comprise geographical isolation from important activities in adjacent communities. Other perceived losses include inefficiency and lack of mobility in the service of others, and insufficient appeal to potential members. These different emphases emerged within the framework of the Rule in the course of history and are to some extent present within the Benedictine Confederation and the Cistercian Orders of the Common and the Strict Observance.

== Origins ==
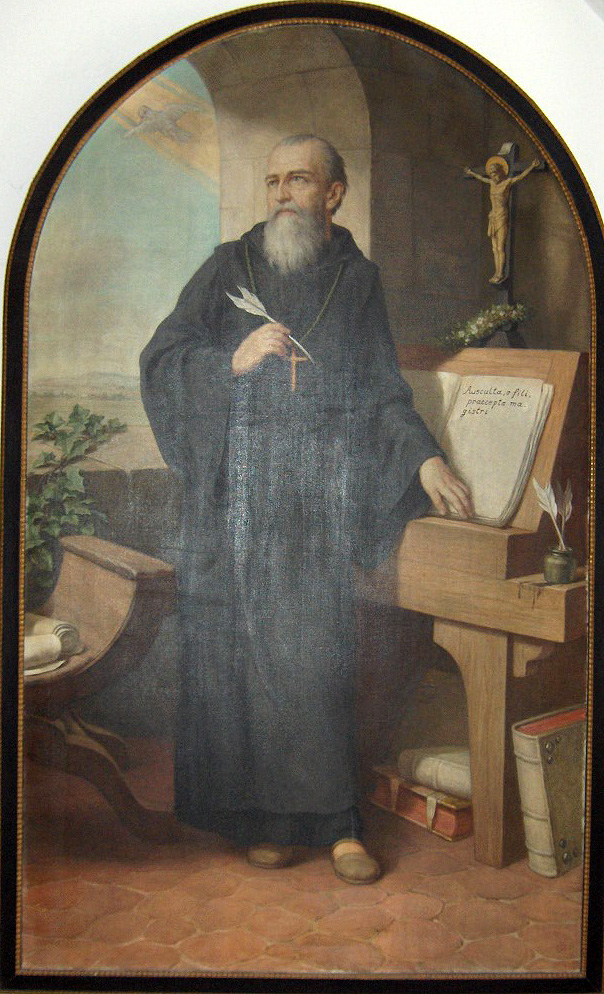
Saint Benedict writing the rules. Painting (1926) by Hermann Nigg (1849–1928).

Christian monasticism first appeared in the Egyptian desert, before Benedict of Nursia. Under the inspiration of Saint Anthony the Great (251–356), ascetic monks led by Saint Pachomius (286–346) formed the first Christian monastic communities under what became known as an Abbot, from the Aramaic abba (father).

Within a generation, both solitary as well as communal monasticism became very popular and spread outside of Egypt towards the Southern Levant, first to the Canaan (region) and the Judean Desert and thence to Syria and North Africa. Saint Basil of Caesarea codified the precepts for these eastern monasteries in his Ascetic Rule, or Ascetica, which is still used today in the Eastern Orthodox Church.

In the West in about the year 500, Benedict became so upset by the immorality of society in Rome that he gave up his studies there, at age fourteen, and chose the life of an ascetic monk in the pursuit of personal holiness, living as a hermit in a cave near the rugged region of Subiaco. In time, setting an example with his zeal, he began to attract disciples. After considerable initial struggles with his first community at Subiaco, he eventually founded the monastery of Monte Cassino in 529, where he wrote his Rule near the end of his life.

In chapter 73, Saint Benedict commends the Rule of Saint Basil and alludes to further authorities. He was probably aware of the Rule written by Pachomius (or attributed to him), and his Rule also shows influence by the Rule of St Augustine of Hippo and the writings of Saint John Cassian. Benedict's greatest debt, however, may be to the anonymous document known as the Rule of the Master, which Benedict seems to have radically excised, expanded, revised and corrected in the light of his own considerable experience and insight. Saint Benedict's work expounded upon preconceived ideas that were present in the religious community only making minor changes more in line with the time period relevant to his system.

The Rule was translated into Armenian by Nerses of Lampron in the 10th century and is used by the Armenian Catholic Mekhitarists today. It was also translated into Old English by Æthelwold of Winchester.

== Overview ==
The Rule opens with a hortatory preface, drawing on the Admonitio ad filium spiritualem, in which Saint Benedict sets forth the main principles of the religious life, viz.: the renunciation of one's own will and arming oneself "with the strong and noble weapons of obedience" under the banner of "the true King, Christ the Lord" (Prol. 3). He proposes to establish a "school for the Lord's service" (Prol. 45) in which the "way to salvation" (Prol. 48) shall be taught, so that by persevering in the monastery till death his disciples may "through patience share in the passion of Christ that [they] may deserve also to share in his Kingdom" (Prol. 50, passionibus Christi per patientiam participemur, ut et regno eius mereamur esse consortes; note: Latin passionibus and patientiam have the same root, cf. Fry, RB 1980, p.167).

- Chapter 1 defines four kinds of monk:
1. Cenobites, those "in a monastery, where they serve under a rule and an abbot".
2. Anchorites, or hermits, who, after long successful training in a monastery, are now coping single-handedly with only God for their help.
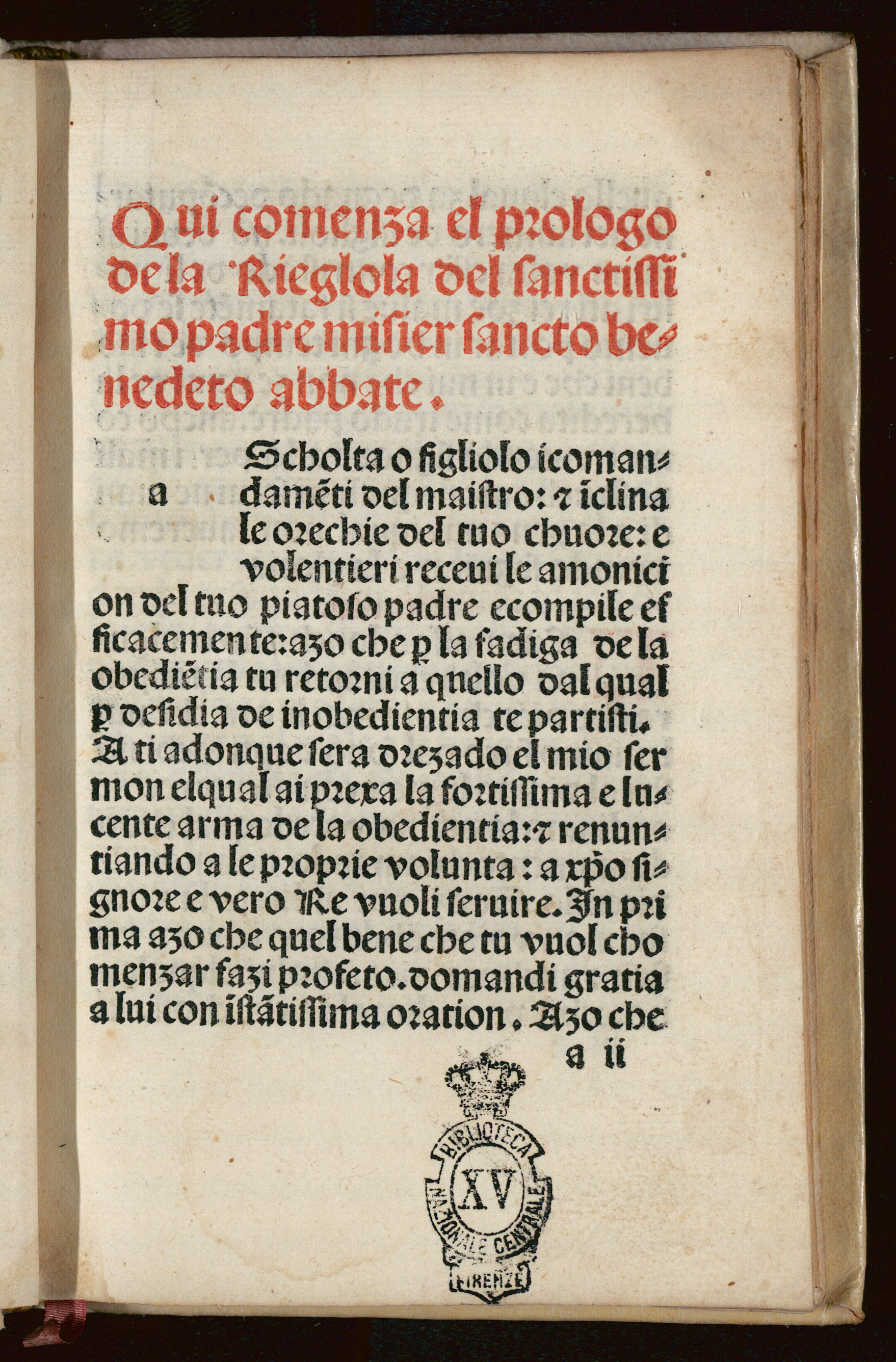
  Regula, 1495
3. Sarabaites, living by twos and threes together or even alone, with no experience, rule and superior, and thus a law unto themselves.
4. Gyrovagues, wandering from one monastery to another, slaves to their own wills and appetites.

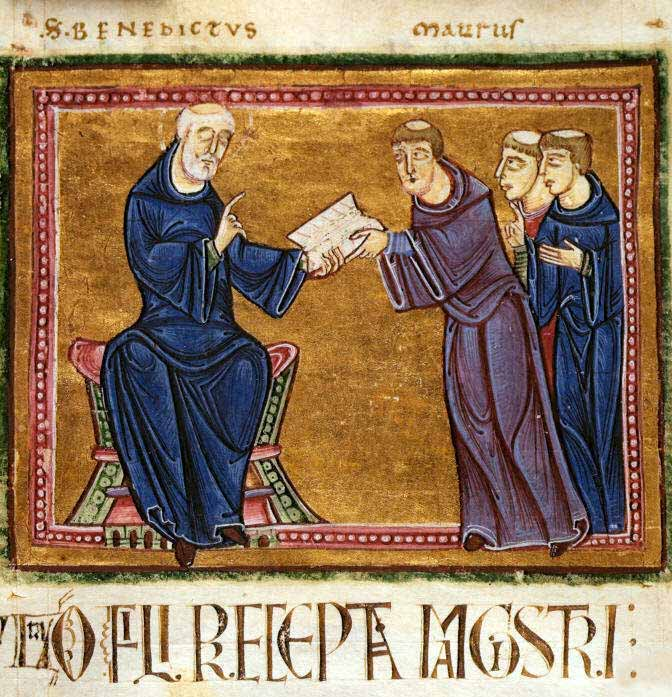
Saint Benedict delivering his rule to the monks of his order, Monastery of St. Gilles, Nimes, France, 1129

- Chapter 2 describes the necessary qualifications of an abbot, forbids the abbot to make distinctions between persons in the monastery except for particular merit, and warns him that he will be answerable for the salvation of the souls in his care.
- Chapter 3 ordains the calling of the brothers to council upon all affairs of importance to the community.
- Chapter 4 lists several "tools for good work", "tools of the spiritual craft" for the "workshop" that is "the enclosure of the monastery and the stability in the community". These are essentially the duties of every Christian and are mainly Scriptural either in letter or in spirit. There are around 72–74 "tools", depending on how phrases are split up and counted in various translations, as the original was not numbered.
- Chapter 5 prescribes prompt, ungrudging, and absolute obedience to the superior in all things lawful, "unhesitating obedience" being called the first step (Latin gradus) of humility.
- Chapter 6 recommends taciturnity (Latin taciturnitas), i.e. the state or quality of being reserved or reticent in conversation, in the use of speech.
- Chapter 7 divides humility into twelve steps forming rungs in a ladder that leads to heaven:(1) Fear God; (2) Subordinate one's will to the will of God; (3) Be obedient to one's superior; (4) Be patient amid hardships; (5) Confess one's sins; (6) Accept the meanest of tasks, and hold oneself as a "worthless workman"; (7) Consider oneself "inferior to all"; (8) Follow examples set by superiors; (9) Do not speak until spoken to; (10) Do not readily laugh; (11) Speak simply and modestly; and (12) Express one's inward humility through bodily posture.
- Chapter 8–19 regulate the Divine Office, the Godly work to which "nothing is to be preferred", namely the eight canonical hours. Detailed arrangements are made for the number of Psalms, etc., to be recited in winter and summer, on Sundays, weekdays, Holy Days, and at other times.
- Chapter 19 emphasizes the reverence owed to the omnipresent God.
- Chapter 20 directs that prayer be made with heartfelt compunction rather than many words. It should be prolonged only under the inspiration of divine grace, and in community always kept short and terminated at a sign from the superior.
- Chapter 21 regulates the appointment of a Dean over every ten monks.
- Chapter 22 regulates the dormitory. Each monk is to have a separate bed and is to sleep in his habit, so as to be ready to rise without delay for the Divine Office at night; a candle (Latin "candela") shall burn in the dormitory throughout the night.
- Chapters 23–29 specify a graduated scale of punishments for contumacy (refusal to obey authority), disobedience, pride, and other grave faults: first, private admonition; next, public reproof; then separation from the brothers at meals and elsewhere; and finally excommunication (or in the case of those lacking understanding of what this means, corporal punishment instead).
- Chapter 30 directs that a wayward brother who has left the monastery must be received again, if he promises to make amends; but if he leaves again, and again, after his third departure all return is finally barred.
- Chapters 31 and 32 order the appointment of officials to take charge of the goods of the monastery.
- Chapter 33 forbids the private possession of anything without the leave of the abbot, who is, however, bound to supply all necessities.
- Chapter 34 prescribes a just distribution of such things.
- Chapter 35 arranges for the service in the kitchen by all monks in turn.
- Chapters 36 and 37 address care of the sick, the old, and the young. They are to have certain dispensations from the strict Rule, chiefly in the matter of food.
- Chapter 38 prescribes reading aloud during meals, which duty is to be performed by those who can do so with edification to the rest. Signs are to be used for whatever may be wanted at meals, so that no voice interrupts the reading. The reader eats with the servers after the rest have finished, but he is allowed a little food beforehand in order to lessen the fatigue of reading.
- Chapters 39 and 40 regulate the quantity and quality of the food. Two meals a day are allowed, with two cooked dishes at each. Each monk is allowed a pound of bread and a hemina (about a quarter litre) of wine. The flesh of four-footed animals is prohibited except for the sick and the weak.
- Chapter 41 prescribes the hours of the meals, which vary with the time of year.
- Chapter 42 enjoins the reading of an edifying book in the evening, and orders strict silence after Compline.
- Chapters 43–46 define penalties for minor faults, such as coming late to prayer or meals.
- Chapter 47 requires the abbot to call the brothers to the "work of God" (Opus Dei) in choir, and to appoint chanters and readers.
- Chapter 48 emphasizes the importance of daily manual labour appropriate to the ability of the monk. The duration of labour varies with the season but is never less than five hours a day.
- Chapter 49 recommends some voluntary self-denial for Lent, with the abbot's sanction.
- Chapters 50 and 51 contain rules for monks working in the fields or travelling. They are directed to join in spirit, as far as possible, with their brothers in the monastery at the regular hours of prayers.
- Chapter 52 commands that the oratory be used for purposes of devotion only.
- Chapter 53 deals with hospitality. Guests are to be met with due courtesy by the abbot or his deputy; during their stay they are to be under the special protection of an appointed monk; "they are to be received with all care and hospitality, for it is in them that Christ is received", although they are not to associate with the rest of the community except by special permission.
- Chapter 54 forbids the monks to receive letters or gifts without the abbot's leave.
- Chapter 55 says clothing is to be adequate and suited to the climate and locality, at the discretion of the abbot. It must be as plain and cheap as is consistent with due economy. Each monk is to have a change of clothes to allow for washing, and when travelling is to have clothes of better quality. Old clothes are to be given to the poor.
- Chapter 56 directs the abbot to eat with the guests.
- Chapter 57 enjoins humility on the craftsmen of the monastery, and if their work is for sale, it shall be rather below than above the current trade price.
- Chapter 58 lays down rules for the admission of new members, which is not to be made too easy. The postulant first spends a short time as a guest; then he is admitted to the novitiate where his vocation is severely tested; during this time he is always free to leave. If after twelve months' probation he perseveres, he may promise before the whole community stabilitate sua et conversatione morum suorum et oboedientia – "stability, conversion of manners, and obedience". With this vow he binds himself for life to the monastery of his profession.
- Chapter 59 describes the ceremony of indenturing young boys into the monastery and arranges certain financial arrangements for this.
- Chapter 60 regulates the position of priests who join the community. They are to set an example of humility, and can only exercise their priestly functions by permission of the abbot.
- Chapter 61 provides for the reception of foreign monks as guests, and for their admission to the community.
- Chapter 62 deals with the ordination of priests from within the monastic community.
- Chapter 63 lays down that precedence in the community shall be determined by the date of admission, merit of life, or the appointment of the abbot.
- Chapter 64 orders that the abbot be elected by his monks, and that he be chosen for his charity, zeal, and discretion.
- Chapter 65 allows the appointment of a prior or deputy superior, but warns that he is to be entirely subject to the abbot and may be admonished, deposed, or expelled for misconduct.
- Chapter 66 appoints a porter, and recommends that each monastery be self-contained and avoid intercourse with the outer world.
- Chapter 67 instructs monks how to behave on a journey.
- Chapter 68 orders that all cheerfully try to do whatever is commanded, however apparently impossible it may seem.
- Chapter 69 forbids the monks from defending one another.
- Chapter 70 prohibits them from beating (Latin caedere) or excommunicating one another.
- Chapter 71 encourages the brothers to be obedient not only to the abbot and his officials, but also to one another.
- Chapter 72 briefly exhorts the monks to zeal and fraternal charity.
- Chapter 73 is an epilogue; it declares that the Rule is not offered as an ideal of perfection, but merely as a means towards godliness, intended chiefly for beginners in the spiritual life.

== Outline of the Benedictine life ==
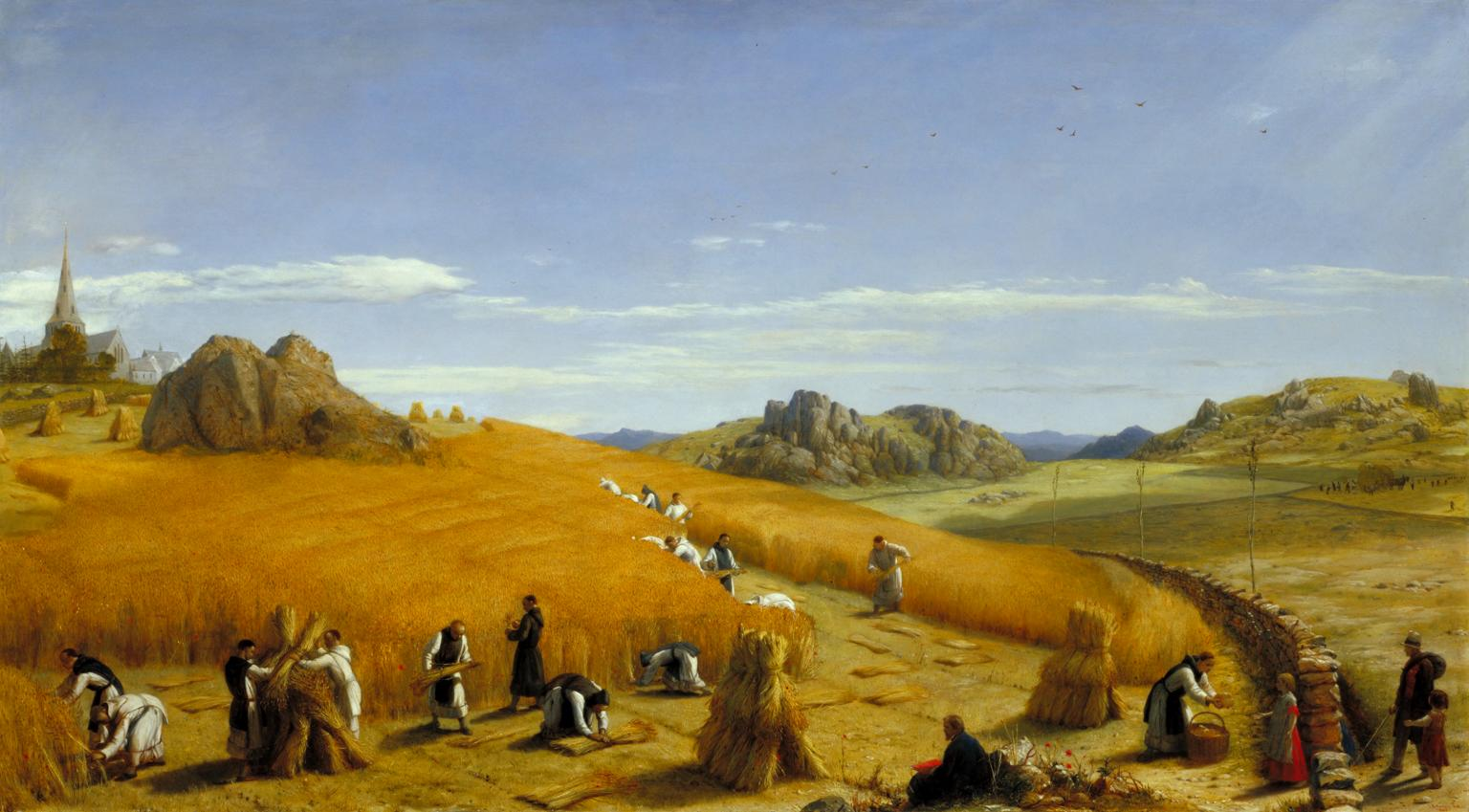
Laborare est Orare (To Work is to Pray). This 1862 painting by John Rogers Herbert depicts monks at work in the fields.

Saint Benedict's model for the monastic life was the family, with the abbot as father and all the monks as brothers. Priesthood was not initially an important part of Benedictine monasticism – monks used the services of their local priest. Because of this, almost all the Rule is applicable to communities of women under the authority of an abbess. This appeal to multiple groups would later make the Rule of Saint Benedict an integral set of guidelines for the development of the Christian faith.

Saint Benedict's Rule organises the monastic day into regular periods of communal and private prayer, sleep, spiritual reading, and manual labour – ut in omnibus glorificetur Deus, "that in all [things] God may be glorified" (cf. Rule ch. 57.9). In later centuries, intellectual work and teaching took the place of farming, crafts, or other forms of manual labour for many – if not most – Benedictines.

Traditionally, the daily life of the Benedictine revolved around the eight canonical hours. The monastic timetable, or Horarium, would begin at midnight with the service, or "office", of Matins (today also called the Office of Readings), followed by the morning office of Lauds at 3 am. Before the advent of wax candles in the 14th century, this office was said in the dark or with minimal lighting; and monks were expected to memorise everything. These services could be very long, sometimes lasting till dawn, but usually consisted of a chant, three antiphons, three psalms, and three lessons, along with celebrations of any local saints' days. Afterwards the monks would retire for a few hours of sleep and then rise at 6am to wash and attend the office of Prime. They then gathered in Chapter to receive instructions for the day and to attend to any judicial business. Then came private Mass or spiritual reading or work until 9am when the office of Terce was said, and then High Mass. At noon came the office of Sext and the midday meal. After a brief period of communal recreation, the monk could retire to rest until the office of None at 3pm. This was followed by farming and housekeeping work until after twilight, the evening prayer of Vespers at 6pm, then the night prayer of Compline at 9pm, and retiring to bed, before beginning the cycle again. In modern times, this timetable is often changed to accommodate any apostolate outside the monastic enclosure (e.g. the running of a school or parish).

Many Benedictine Houses have a number of Oblates (secular) who are affiliated with them in prayer, having made a formal private promise (usually renewed annually) to follow the Rule of St Benedict in their private life as closely as their individual circumstances and prior commitments permit.

Since the early 2000s, management scholars have examined the applicability of the principles and spirit of the Rule of Saint Benedict to the secular working environment.

== Reforms ==
During the more than 1500 years of their existence, Benedictines have seen cycles of flourish and decline. Several reform movements sought more intense devotion to both the letter and spirit of the Rule of St Benedict, at least as they understood it. Examples include the Camaldolese, the Cistercians, the Trappists (a reform of the Cistercians), and the Sylvestrines.

== Secular significance ==
Charlemagne had Benedict's Rule copied and distributed to encourage monks throughout western Europe to follow it as a standard. Beyond its religious influences, the Rule of St Benedict was one of the most important written works to shape medieval Europe, embodying the ideas of a written constitution and the rule of law. It also incorporated a degree of democracy in a non-democratic society, and dignified manual labor.

== Popular motto Ora et labora ==
Although not stated explicitly in the rule, the motto Ora et labora (pray and work) is widely considered to be a shortform capturing the spirit of the rule.

== See also ==
- Rule of Saint Augustine
- Rule of Saint Basil
- Benedictine rite
- Columban Rule
- Rule of the Master
- Rule of Saint Albert
- Latin Rule
- Customary (liturgy)
