= Sarabaites =

Kind of Christian monk

Sarabaites were a kind of Christian monk widespread before the time of Benedict of Nursia. They were also known as remoboths.

== History ==
They either continued like the early asceticism, to live in their own homes, or dwelt together in or near cities. They acknowledged no monastic superior, obeyed no definite rule, and disposed individually of the product of their manual labour.

Jerome speaks of them under the name remoboth, and John Cassian tells of their wide diffusion in Egypt and other lands. Both writers express a very unfavourable opinion concerning their conduct, and a reference to them in the Rule of Saint Benedict is of similar import.

Philologists have attempted to discover Coptic terms behind the names. At a later date, the name Sarabaites designated in a general way degenerate monks. The Rule of St. Benedict considered their non-adherence to church canon only to be exceeded by the gyrovagues.

== See also ==
- Gyrovagues
- Rule of Saint Benedict
