= Ford Capri EV =

Battery electric compact crossover SUV

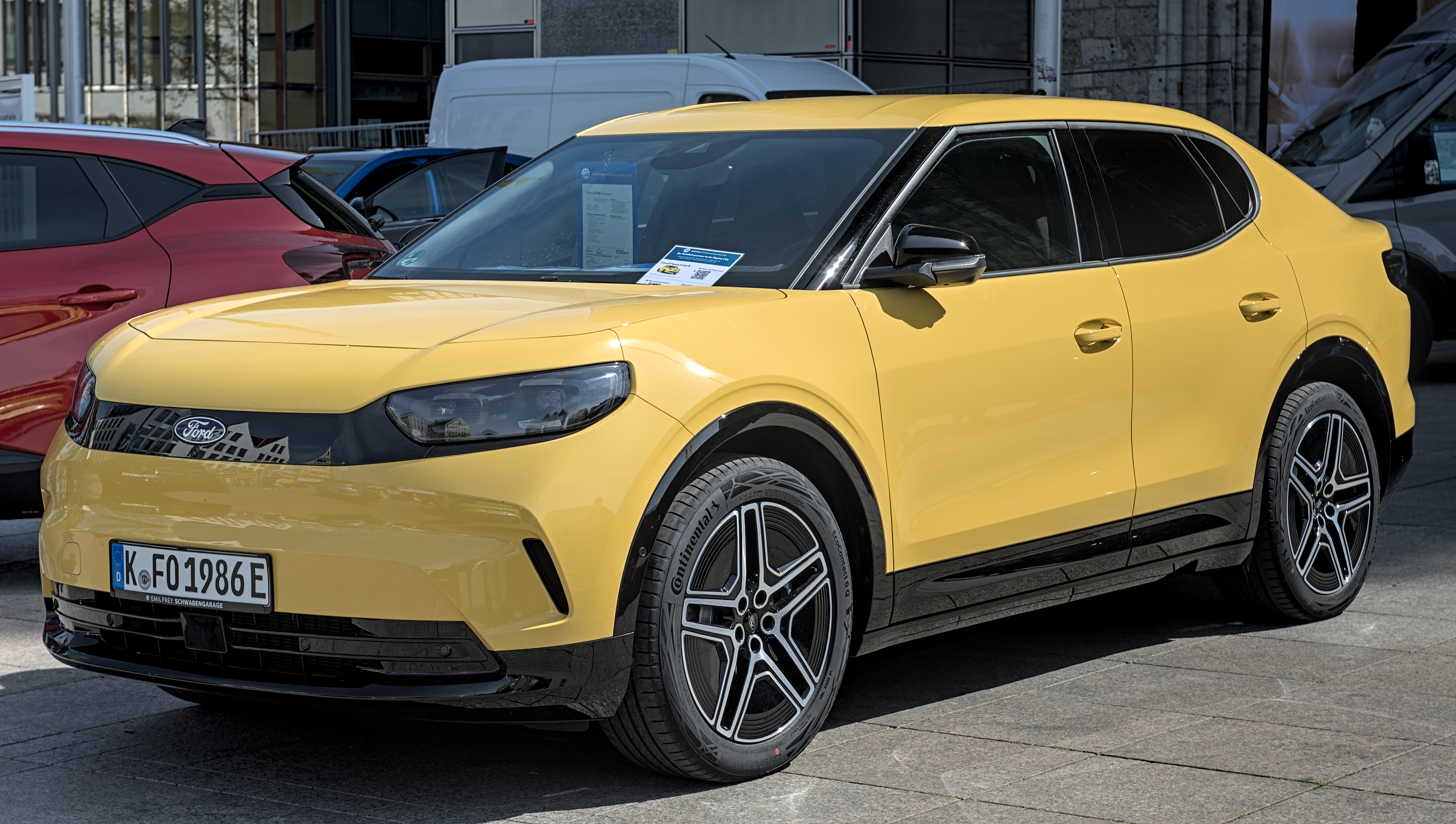

Overview
- Manufacturer: Ford
- Production: 2024–present
- Assembly: Germany: Cologne (Cologne Body & Assembly)
- Designer: Amko Leenarts

Body and chassis
- Class: Compact crossover SUV (C)
- Body style: 5-door coupe SUV
- Layout: Rear-motor, rear-wheel-drive; Dual-motor, all-wheel-drive
- Platform: Volkswagen Group MEB
- Related: Ford Explorer EV; Volkswagen ID.4/ID.5; Cupra Tavascan

Powertrain
- Electric motor: APP 550 permanent magnet synchronous
- Battery: 52-77 kWh lithium-ion (RWD); 79 kWh lithium-ion (AWD)
- Range: 592–627 km (368–390 mi) (WLTP)

Dimensions
- Wheelbase: 2,767 mm (108.9 in)
- Length: 4,634 mm (182.4 in)
- Width: 1,872 mm (73.7 in)
- Height: 1,626 mm (64.0 in)
- Kerb weight: 2,098–2,190 kg (4,625–4,828 lb)

The Ford Capri EV is a battery electric compact crossover SUV (C-segment) produced by Ford through its European operations. Produced in the Cologne Body & Assembly in Germany and marketed mainly in Europe, the vehicle is based on the Volkswagen Group MEB platform and uses Volkswagen-supplied batteries. The vehicle shares its name with the original Ford Capri.

== Overview ==
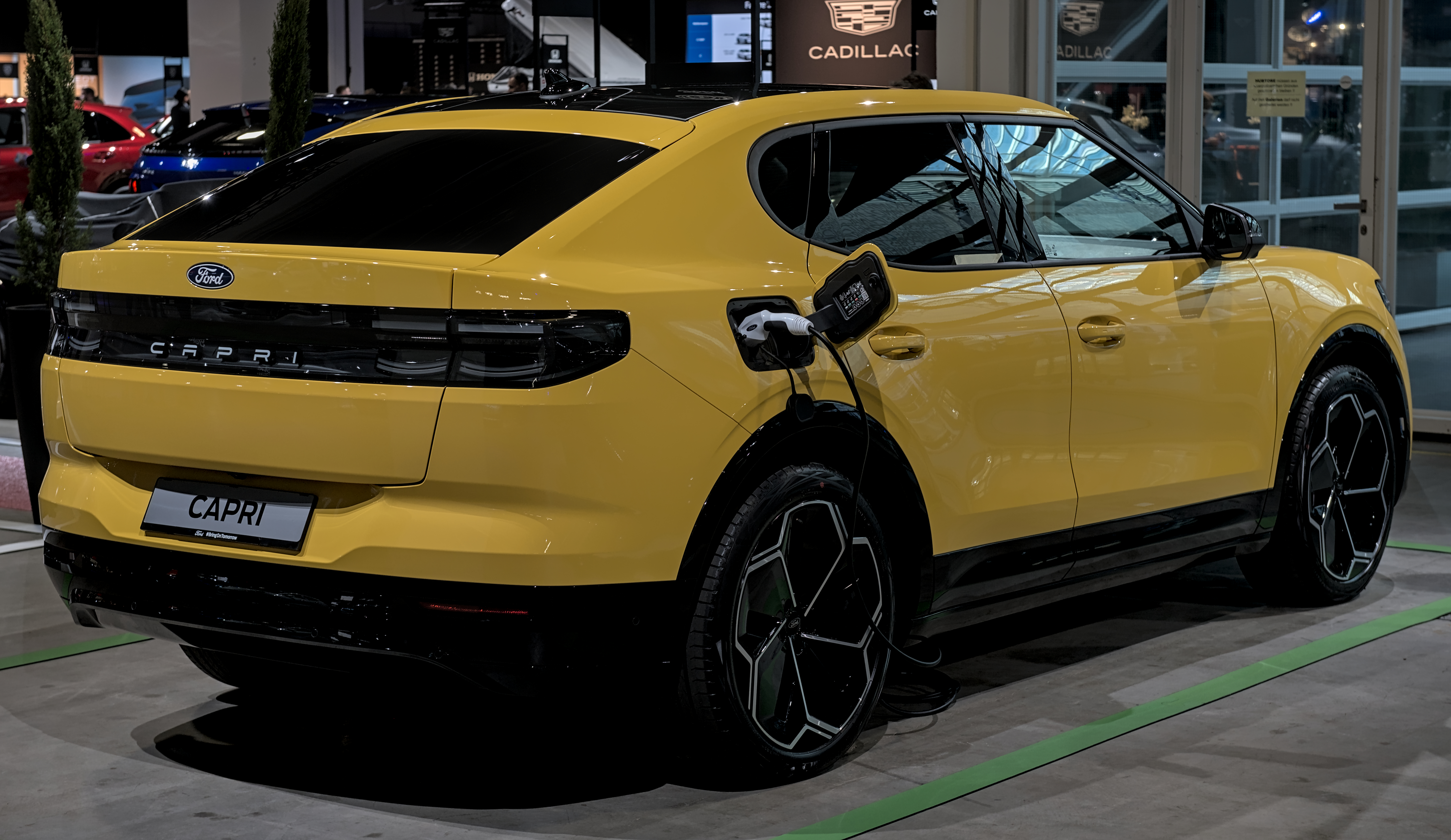
Rear view

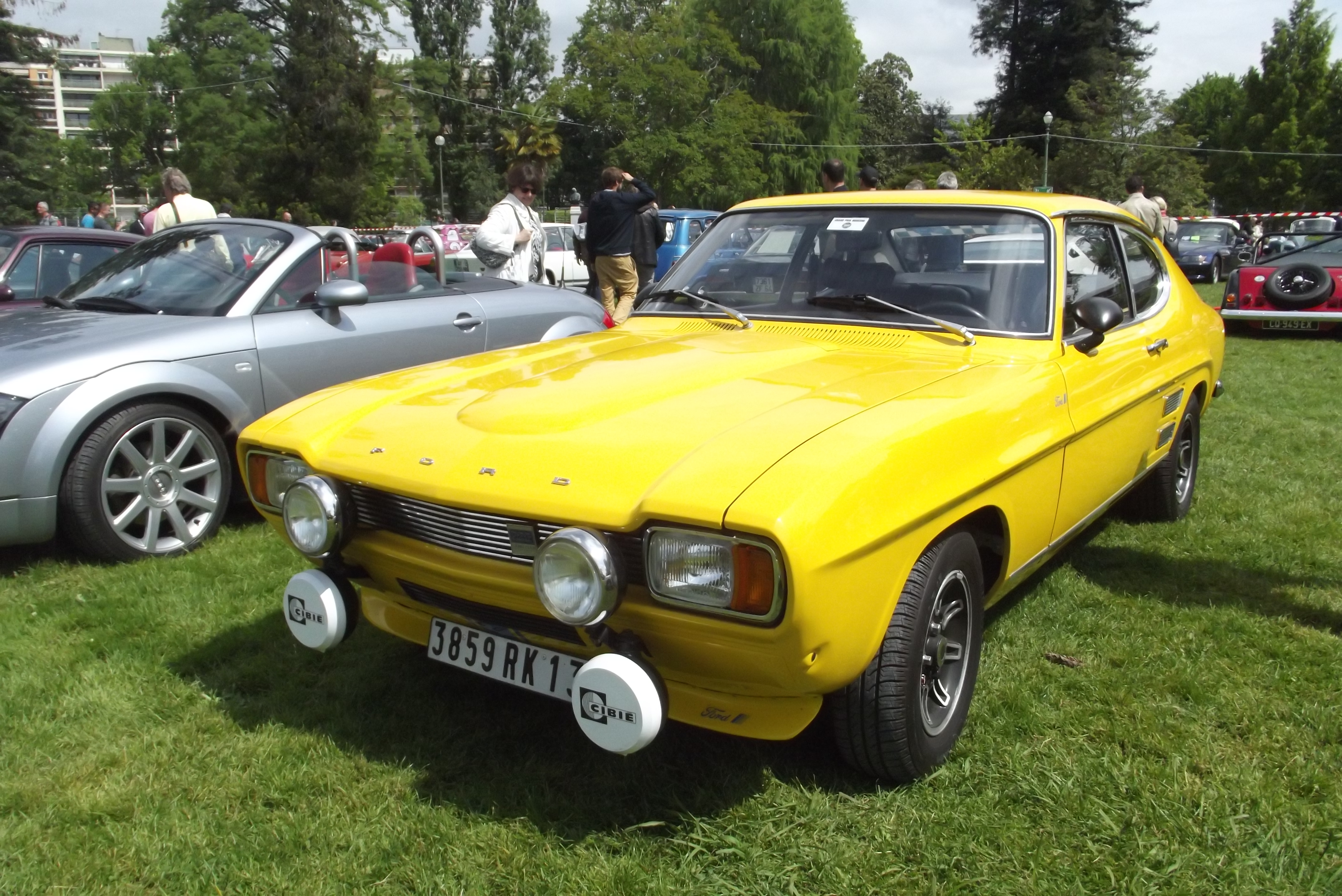
The Capri EV takes its name from the original Ford Capri, produced by Ford of Europe from 1968 to 1986.

In early 2023, there was speculation that Ford could revive the Capri nameplate in Europe as an electric sports crossover coupe, similar to the revival of the Puma nameplate in 2019. Though the Capri name was not confirmed by Ford, instead being named the "Sport Crossover" prior to an official launch in 2024, the vehicle would be based on the Volkswagen Group MEB platform and would share technology and design cues from the 2024 Ford Explorer EV. A camouflaged pre-production vehicle was later photographed driving around Cologne in November 2023. The vehicle was unveiled on 10 July 2024.

According to Amko Leenarts, design director at Ford Europe, the Capri is part of Ford's Hero Nameplates strategy, which involves creating unique vehicles that stand out from each other and from the competition. He states that the challenge for Ford was to avoid making a retro car and instead create a modern vehicle aimed at the ‘Aspirer’ customer, who is an early adopter of modern technology.

=== Design ===
The Capri has many styling elements borrowed from the Explorer EV, with several body panels shared between the two models, such as the bonnet, front fenders and doors. Compared to the Explorer EV, the suspension of the Capri is lowered by 10 mm (1.0 cm) and has a stiffer setup.

The exterior showcases four LED headlight elements linked by a horizontal black grille, reminiscent of a detail that became iconic in the 1980s. The side displays a coupe-like silhouette akin to the original model, featuring the distinctive ‘Capri Swoosh’ on the side windows. At the rear, the design reflects the front, with LED taillights divided into four sections and connected to an uninterrupted black fascia. Capri lettering is positioned behind the glossy black trim, and the rear windscreen wiper has been removed to maintain the car’s sleek profile. Both the front and rear lights exhibit a 'dogbone' effect linked to the glossy black trim, aiming to replicate the quad headlight design of the third-generation Capri.

=== Interior ===
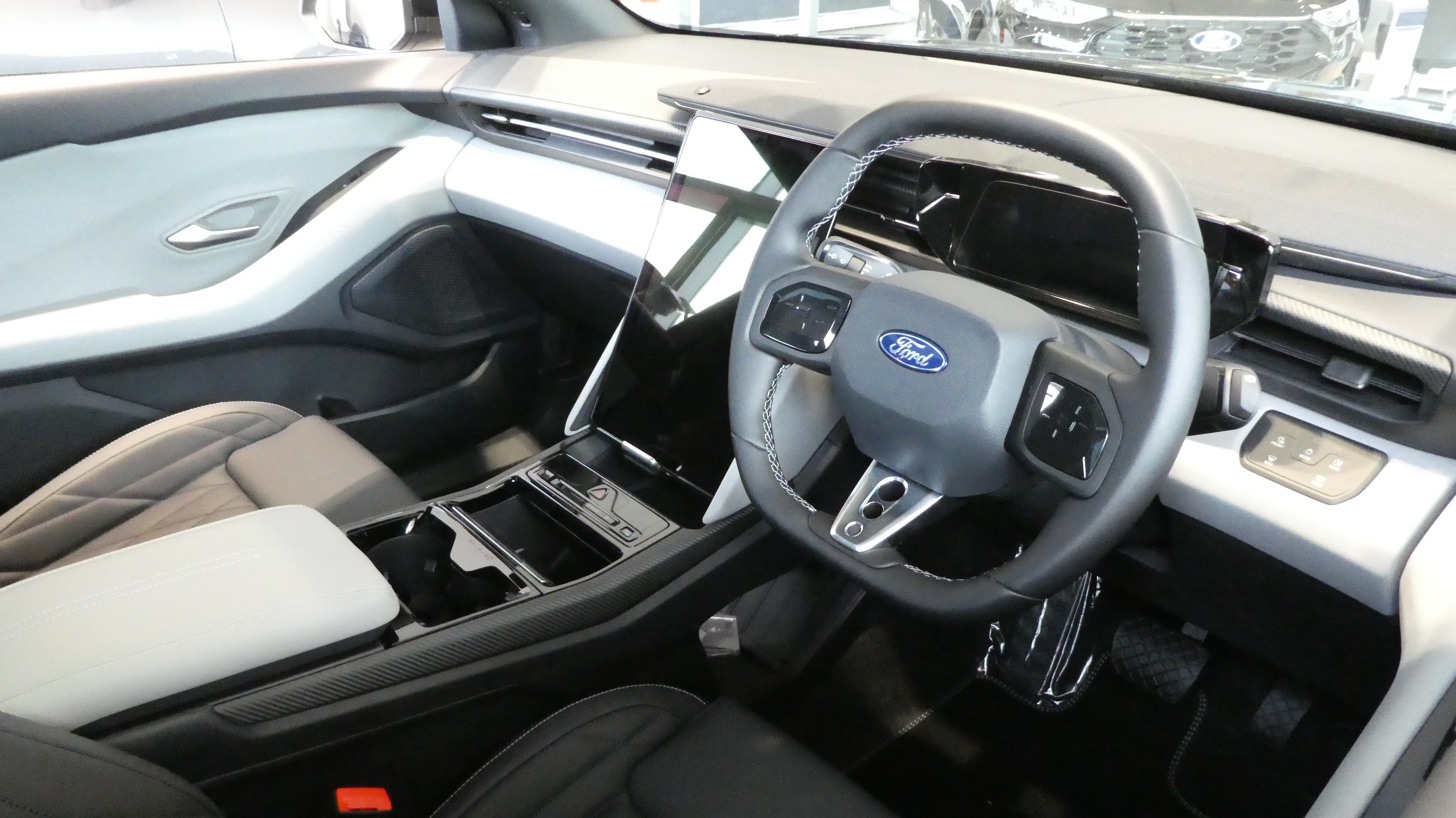
Interior

The interior of the Capri has a human-centric and minimalistic approach. It features a 5-inch digital instrument cluster, an adjustable 15-inch Sync Move touchscreen, and a Bang and Olufsen sound bar speaker that spans across top of the dashboard. The Capri uses a new material called "Sensical", that is leather-free and it is part of Ford's sustainability goals.

Pushing back the touchscreen reveals a lockable storage space called 'my private locker' with USB ports. There are two storage compartments; one with wireless charging for phones, and another with removable cup holders, as feedback from European consumers shows preference for storage over cupholders. There is a MegaConsole 17 L (0.6 cu ft) storage area under the front centre armrest, a first in the automotive industry.

The third spoke of the steering wheel features a metal-effect with drilled holes retrospective to the Cortina Mark II that the original Capri was based on and the base model comes standard with cloth seats with a vintage stripe.

== Safety ==
Euro NCAP test results Ford Capri (LHD) (2024)
Test	Points	%
Overall:	5 /5 stars	
Adult occupant:	35.7	89%
Child occupant:	42.2	86%
Pedestrian:	50.7	80%
Safety assist:	13.1	72%
