= Lexie Alford =

American traveller and YouTuber (born 1998)

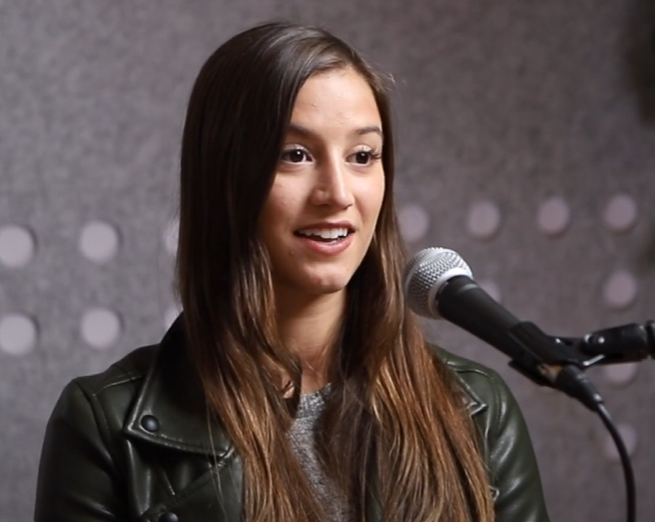
- Alford in 2020
- Born: Alexis Rose Alford; April 10, 1998 (age 28); Nevada City, California, U.S.
- Other name: Lexie Limitless
- Occupations: Adventure traveler; photographer; blogger; YouTube personality

YouTube information
- Channel: LexieLimitless
- Years active: 2017–present
- Genre: Travel
- Subscribers: 763 thousand
- Views: 73.3 million
- Last updated: November 3, 2026
- Website: www.lexielimitless.com

Alexis Rose Alford (born April 10, 1998), also known as Lexie Limitless, is an American adventure traveler and YouTuber who is notable for traveling to 195 countries before reaching the age of twenty-two. Alford was awarded two Guinness World Records; being the "Youngest person to travel to all sovereign countries" and being the "Youngest female to travel to all sovereign countries" at the age of 21 years, 177 days.

== Early life ==
Alford was born and raised in Nevada City, California to a traveling family. She decided by the age of two that she wanted to explore the world. Her parents were travel agents from whom she learned the skills of booking reservations and planning an itinerary. After graduating high school, she received an associate degree at a community college at the age of 18. Her love of travel was inspired by the mole people in the Disney film Atlantis: The Lost Empire.

== Career ==
Alford largely self-funded her travels for the first year and half, later earning additional funding working as a travel consultant for her family's travel agency, participating in occasional brand deals, and securing marketing campaigns related to her travels. When traveling, she creates income by blogging, doing freelance photography, and selling prints. According to Alford, she spends an "ungodly amount of time researching the best travel spots and thoroughly learning how to travel to exotic places". While traveling, she describes herself as a minimalist, carrying only the supplies that she needs in a backpack along with her videography equipment.

I simply wanted to push the limits of what I thought I could do with my life and see as much of the world as possible in the process.

— Alford in 2019

=== YouTube ===
Alford launched her YouTube travel channel, Lexie Limitless, a few years before achieving her world record.

=== Guinness World Records ===
Alford was awarded the Guinness World Record for being the "Youngest person to travel to all sovereign countries" and "Youngest female to travel to all sovereign countries" at the age of 21 years 177 days. On 26 March 2024, she set a world record as the first person to circumnavigate the globe in an electric vehicle, completing a 30,000 kilometres (19,000 mi) journey in the new all-electric Ford Explorer. The expedition, part of her "Charge Around The Globe" initiative with Ford, spanned six continents and 27 countries.
