= Gyrovague =

Wandering or itinerant monk

Gyrovagues (sometimes Gyrovagi or Gyruvagi or gyratory monks) were wandering or itinerant monks without fixed residence or leadership, who relied on charity and the hospitality of others.

The term, coming from French gyrovague, itself from Late Latin gyrovagus (gyro-, "circle" and vagus, "wandering"), refers to a type of monk, rather than to a specific order, and may be pejorative as gyrovagues are almost universally denounced by Christian writers of the Early Middle Ages. The Council of Chalcedon (451) and Second Council of Nicaea (787) prohibit this practice. The "gyrovagi" were denounced as wretched by Benedict of Nursia (480 – 547), who accused them of indulging their passions and cravings. Augustine (354 – 430) called them Circumcelliones (circum cellas = those who prowl around the barns) and attributed the selling of fake relics as their innovation. John Cassian (c. 360 – c. 435) also mentions a class of monk, which may have been identical, who were reputed to be gluttons who refused to fast at the proper times.

== Background ==
Up until the time of Benedict, several attempts had been made by various synods at suppressing and disciplining monks who refused to settle in a cloister. With the establishment of the Rule of St. Benedict in the 8th century, the cenobitic and eremitic forms of monasticism became the accepted form of monasticism within the Christian Church, and the wandering monk phenomenon faded into obscurity.

As with the term Sarabaites, after the eighth century the term Gyrovagi was sometimes used pejoratively to refer to degenerate monks within a monastery, or to travelling salesmen.

In the early 13th century, some of the first Friars Preachers of the Dominican Order were dismissed as gyrovagues, and their active preaching dismissed as beneath the dignity of the serious religious who lived in monasteries.

In Defence of the Mendicants, the Flemish Dominican Thomas of Cantimpré wrote:

Well, my brethren, you need not be ashamed to be called or to be gyrovagues. You are in the company of St. Paul, the teacher of the nations...While they [the monks] sit in their monasteries...you go touring round with Paul, doing the job you have been given to do.

== Legacy ==
=== Use in the history of the anarchist movement ===
The historian Vivien Bouhey established the use of the term 'gyrovague' to designate a specific type of anarchist within the history of the movement and of companionship; in his view, these were anarchists who moved across and penetrated the European territory during the Belle Époque period.

== See also ==
- Friar
- Mendicant orders
- Sarabaites
- Rule of St. Benedict
- The New Schaff-Herzog Encyclopedia of Religious Knowledge

== Bibliography ==
- Bouhey, Vivien (2008), Les Anarchistes contre la République [The Anarchists against the Republic] (in French), Rennes: Presses universitaires de Rennes (PUR)
