= Ford Taunus =

1939–1994 family car

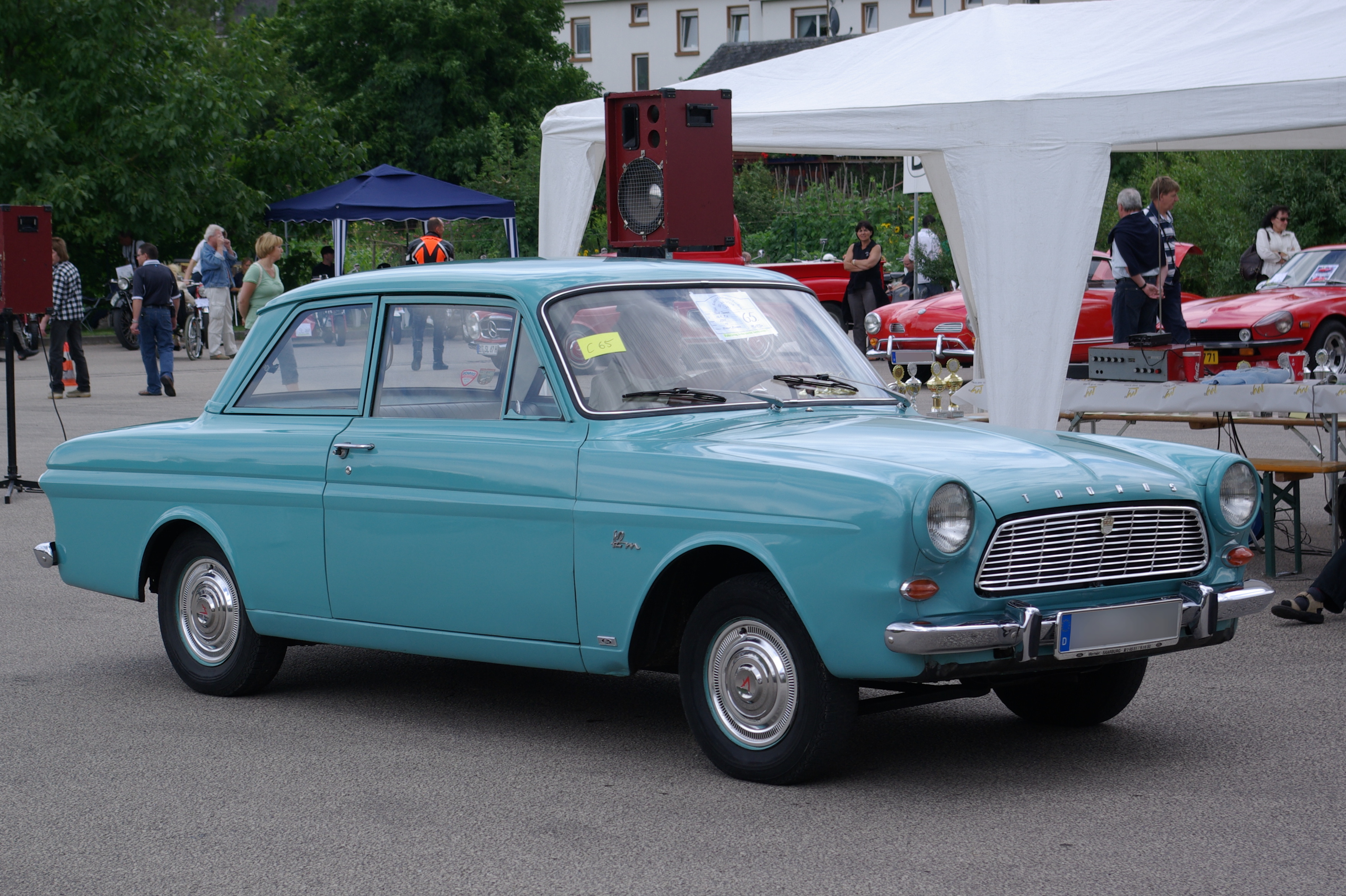
- Ford Taunus P4 (1962–1966)

Overview
- Manufacturer: Ford Germany
- Production: 1939–1994

Body and chassis
- Class: Mid-size car

Chronology
- Predecessor: Ford Eifel, Ford Köln (midsize); Ford Rheinland (full size)
- Successor: Ford Sierra (midsize); Ford Granada (full size)

The Ford Taunus is a family car manufactured and marketed by Ford Germany throughout Europe. It also was occasionally sold in North America. Models from 1970 on were manufactured using the same basic construction as the Ford Cortina MkIII in the United Kingdom, and later on, the two car models were rebadged variants of each other, differing primarily in their steering wheel placement.

Introduced in 1939, and marketed over numerous generations through model year 1994, the model line was named after the Taunus mountain range in Germany.

== Taunus G93A (1939–1942) / G73A (1948–1952) ==
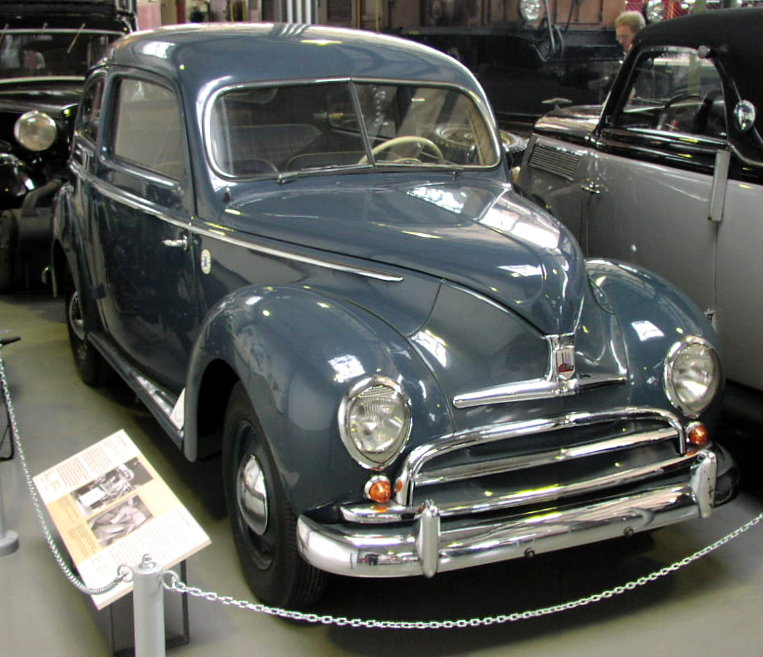
1949 Ford Taunus

The Ford Taunus G93A was a development of the Ford Eifel, and used the same 1172 cc four cylinder engine, but in a longer chassis and a streamlined body. It was the first German Ford to have hydraulic brakes. First introduced in 1939, production was halted in 1942 due to the war. Production recommenced in November 1948 after the British Occupation had ended. In total, 7,128 pre-war Taunuses (G93A) were made, including estate cars and light vans, followed by 76,590 post-war models (G73A).

== Taunus M-series (1952–1968) ==
From 1952 to 1968, all German Fords were called the Taunus, using the model names 12M, 15M, 17M, 20M, and 26M (on some Scandinavian markets, for a short while the branding 10M was used on a slightly better-equipped export version of the early Taunus, which is said to be the precursor of later uses). The "M" is said to stand for "Meisterstück", in English "Masterpiece", but that word was found to be already registered by another German automaker. Taunus was also sometimes adopted as the brand name in export markets, particularly where British and North American Fords were also available.

The 12M, 15M, and 17M models had an engine, which in the first 12M was a carryover of the sidevalve (flathead) engine from the first Taunus series, and beginning with the 15M, it was replaced by an overhead-valve design similar to the British Ford Consul engine. With the introduction of the new 12M line (internal code P4) for 1962 came the V4 engine, which starting in late 1964 with the larger 17M/20M became the base engine for the Taunus M-series. The 20M and 26M models had the Ford Cologne V6 engine, which is basically the same engine design with two extra cylinders added. The 12, 15, 17, etc. numbers refer to the engine displacement; 1200, 1500, 1700 cc, etc. However, a few exceptions from that rule were made, such as 17M 1800, which was powered by the V6 in its smallest displacement and the 20M 2300S (in the later P7 series), which used a 2.3-litre version of the same engine.

From 1962 to 1970, the smaller models 12M (P4) and its successor 12M/15M (P6) had front wheel drive. All other models had rear wheel drive.

These models were offered:

=== Smaller line: 12M, 15M ===
==== First generation 12M (G13; 1952–1959), 15M (1955–1959) ====
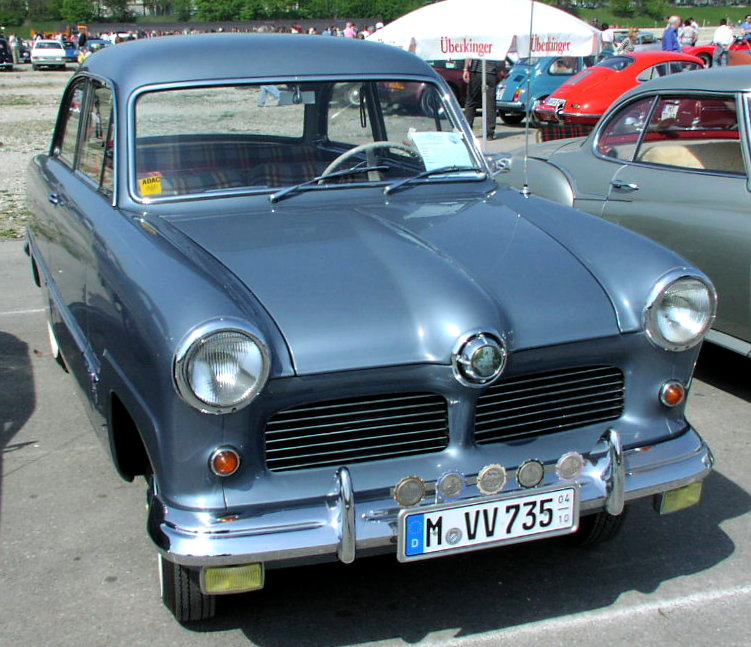
Ford Taunus 12M 1952–1955

The Taunus 12M presented in 1952 was the first new German Ford after World War II. It featured ponton styling, similar in style to British Ford Zephyr.

Something else the new Ford Taunus 12M had in common with British Fords was the retention of an old side-valve engine at a time when competitors were increasingly moving over to overhead-valve units. The Taunus 15M used a new and more powerful engine:

- 12M: 1172 cc, 38 PS (28 kW), 112 km/h (70 mph)
- 15M: 1498 cc, 55 PS (40 kW), 128 km/h (80 mph)

Body styles were two-door sedan, two-door station wagon, and sedan delivery.

==== Second generation (12M; 1959–1962) ====
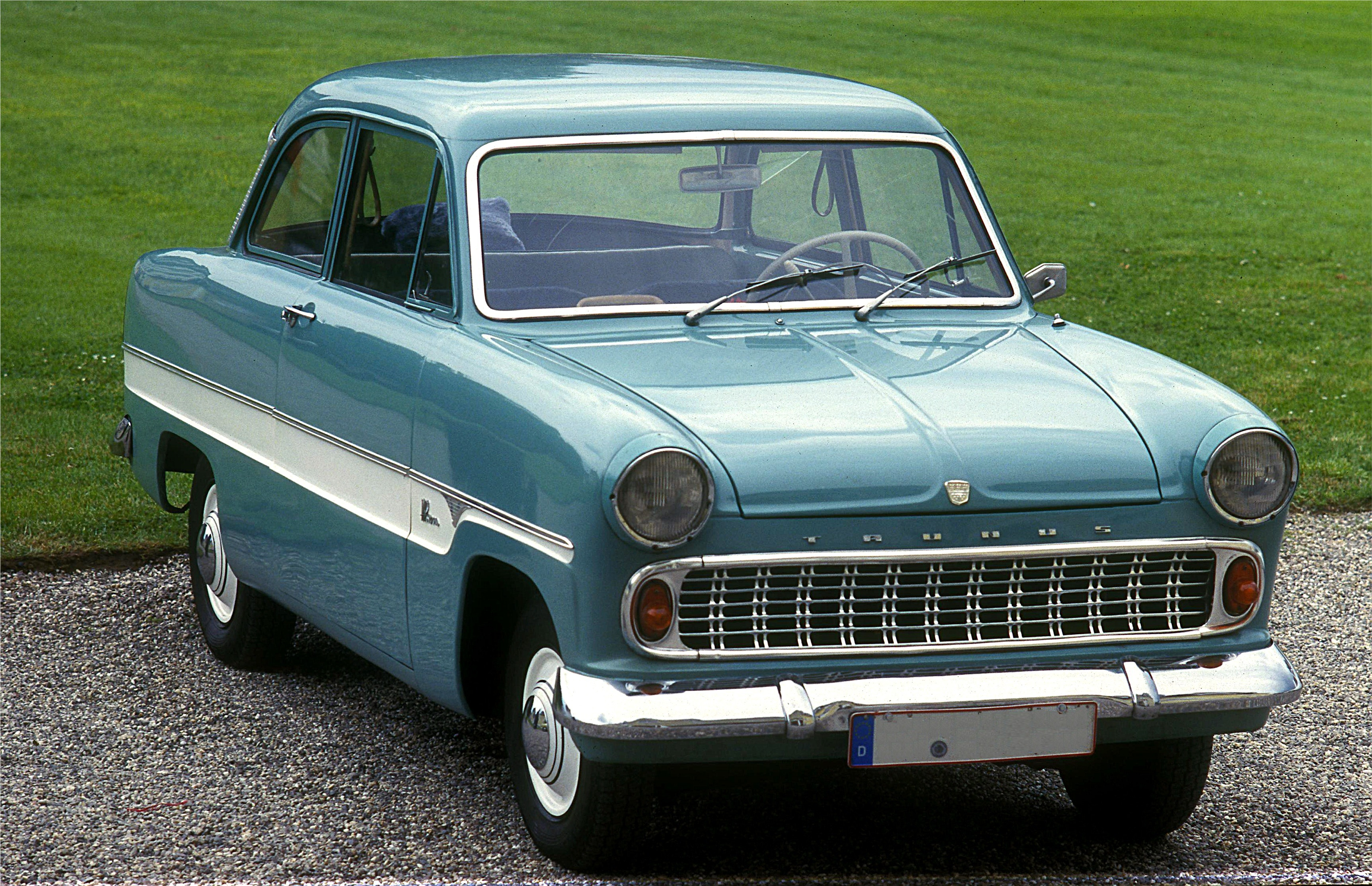
Ford Taunus 12M 1959–1962

The second generation 12M was not a new car, but a reworking of the 1952 model. All cars were called 12M, though both engines were continued. The car with the bigger engine was called Taunus 12M 1.5-litre.

Body styles were the same as in the 1952 model.

==== Third generation 12M (P4; 1962–1966) ====
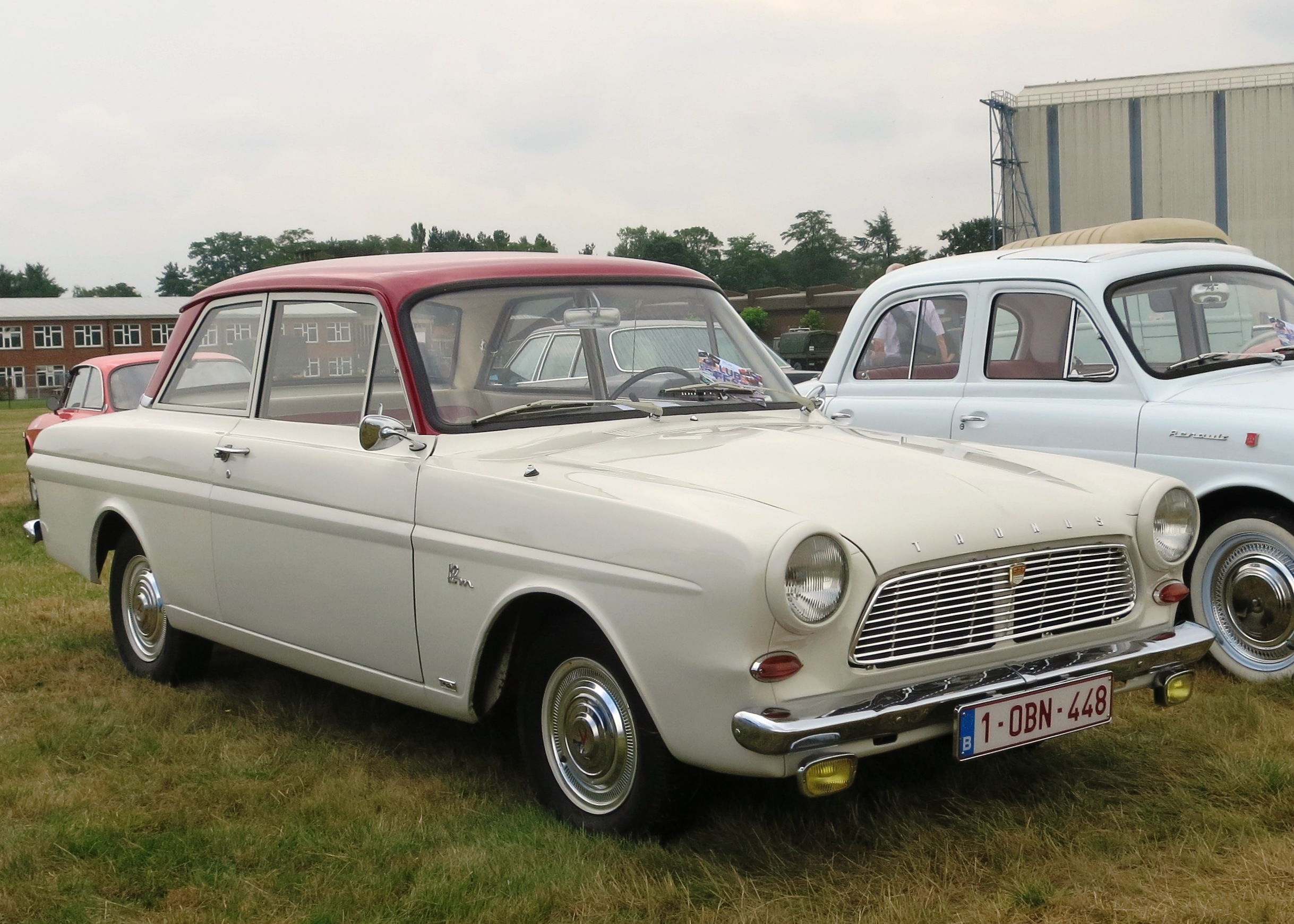
Ford Taunus 12M P4

The new Ford Taunus 12M P4 was similar in size, but a completely new car based on the Ford Cardinal project: New body, new V4 engine, and front-wheel drive. It was the first Ford car with front-wheel drive (second was the Ford Corcel, third was the Ford Fiesta). Engines available included:

- 1.2-litre: 1183 cc, 40 PS (29 kW), 123 km/h (76 mph)
- 1.5-litre: 1498 cc, 50, 55 or 65 PS (37, 40 or 48 kW), 135, 139 or 144 km/h (84, 86 or 89 mph)

Body styles were two-door sedan, four-door sedan, two-door coupé, two-door station wagon, and sedan delivery.

==== Fourth generation 12M and 15M (P6; 1966–1970) ====
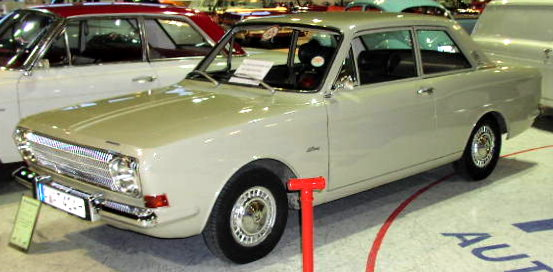
Ford Taunus 12M P6

The Ford Taunus P6 came with new bodies, whilst engines and platform were continued. The car with the bigger engine was now called 15M again. Engines available included:

- 12M 1.2-litre: 1183 cc, 45 PS (33 kW), 125 km/h (78 mph)
- 12M 1.3-litre: 1305 cc, 50 or 53 PS (37 or 39 kW), 130 or 134 km/h (81 or 83 mph)
- 15M 1.5-litre: 1498 cc, 55 or 65 PS (40 or 48 kW), 136 or 145 km/h (85 or 90 mph)
- 15M 1.7-litre: 1699 cc, 70 or 75 PS (51 or 55 kW), 153 or 158 km/h (95 or 98 mph)

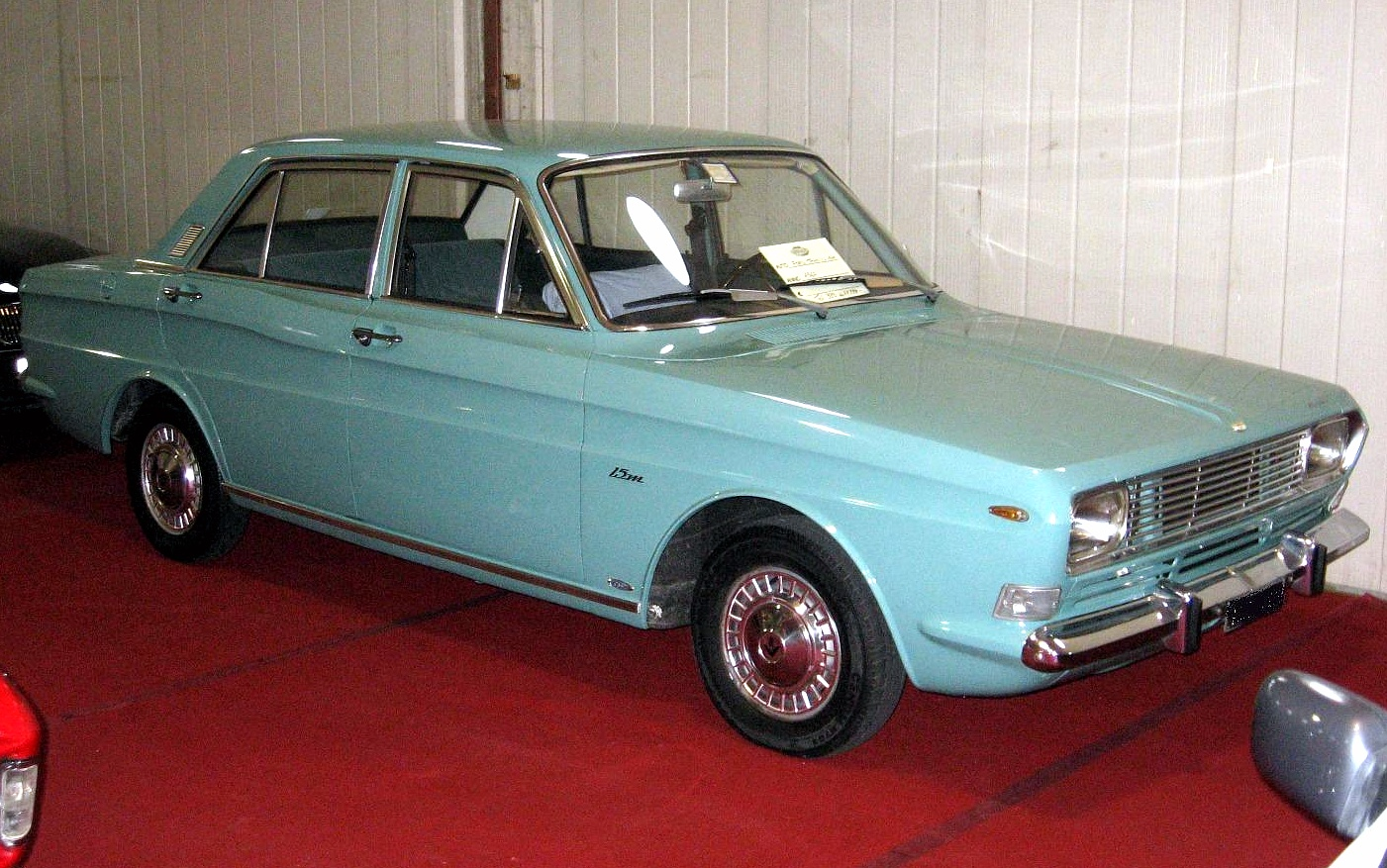
Ford Taunus 15M P6

Body styles were unchanged from the P4.

In 1970, the P6 was replaced by the Taunus TC.

=== Bigger line: 17M, 20M, 26M ===
==== First generation 17M (P2; 1957–1960) ====
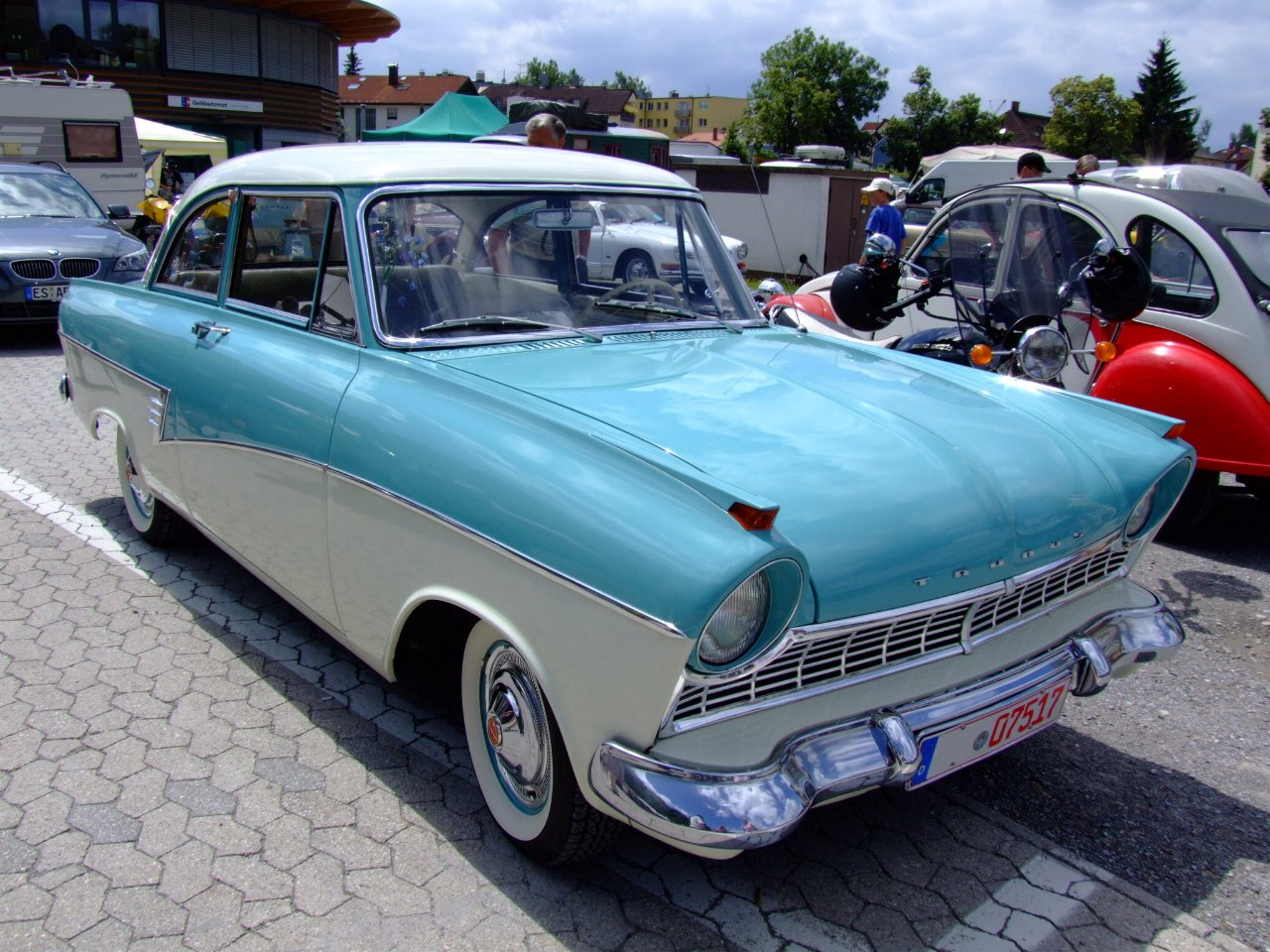
Ford Taunus 17M P2

Growing prosperity in postwar Germany encouraged Ford to offer a line of bigger and more expensive cars. The Ford Taunus 17M of 1957 was as long as (though significantly narrower than) the British Consul Mk2, but a different car. It presented a style similar to American 1955 Fords, featuring substantial (at least by European standards) tailfins. The transatlantic flamboyance of the car's styling gained it the sobriquet "Baroque Taunus", showing styling influences from the North American Mercury Monterey of the same time period. Unusually for middle-class German cars of this period, it was available with either two or four doors. The competition noticed, and from 1959, the Opel Rekord also became available with four doors.

The P2 used an overhead-valve (OHV) engine with 1698 cc and 60 PS (44 kW). A maximum speed of 128 km/h (80 mph) was quoted. A road test of the time commended the smoothness of the three-speed, all-synchromesh manual transmission system.

==== Second generation 17M (P3; 1960–1964) ====
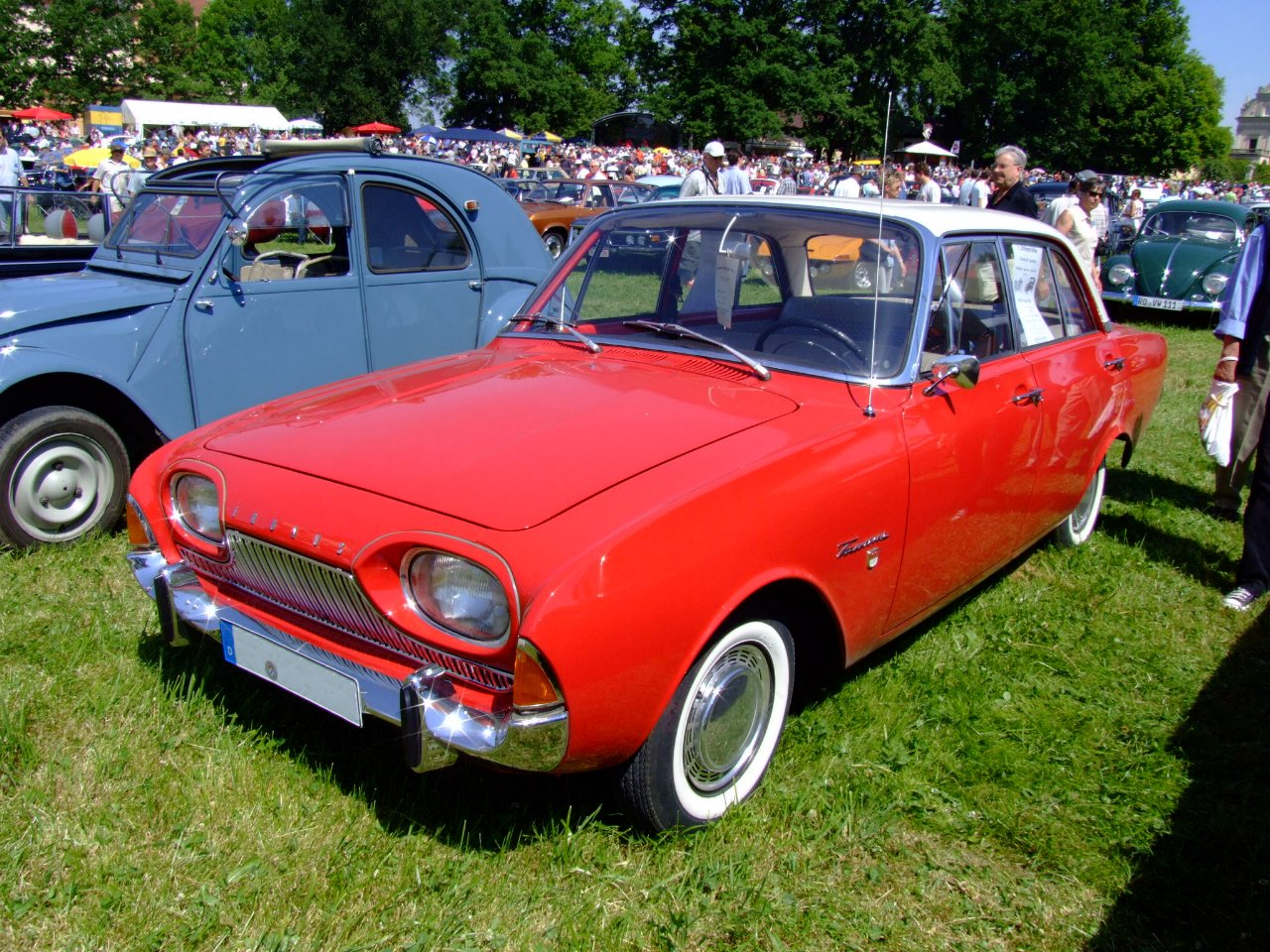
1961 Ford Taunus 17M P3

The Ford Taunus P3 had a completely new body and was completely restyled, earning it nicknames including "Taunus Badewanne". At a time when competitors boasted that all four corners of the vehicles were visible from the driver's seat, the new Taunus instead offered a streamlined form. However, in Germany the concept of streamlining in cars was associated with narrow passenger cabins reminiscent of the 1930s and of the still popular Volkswagen Beetle. The new Taunus, however, provided greater interior width than its predecessor, despite being no wider on the outside. Although the 1.7-litre version was launched with the same 60 PS power output as the outgoing model, the new model was a full 10 km/h (6 mph) faster, which was attributed to improved aerodynamics and a lighter body shell.

Three engine sizes were now offered:

- 1.5-litre: 1498 cc, 55 PS (40 kW), 136 km/h (85 mph)
- 1.7-litre: 1698 cc, 60 or 65 PS (44 or 48 kW), 138 or 140 km/h (86 or 87 mph)
- 1.8-litre: 1758 cc, 70 or 75 PS (51 or 55 kW), 148 or 154 km/h (92 or 96 mph)

==== Third generation 17M and 20M (P5; 1964–1967) ====
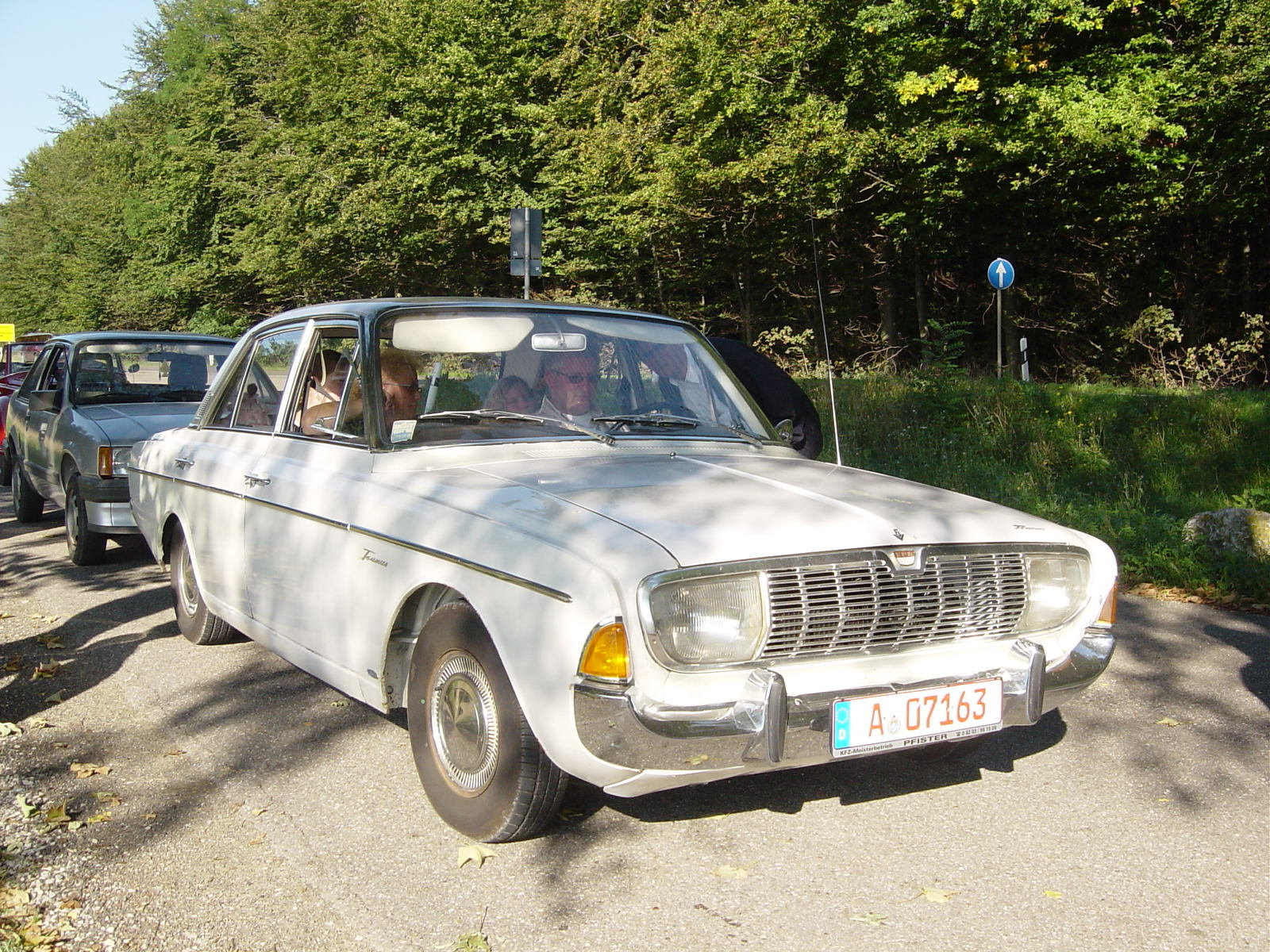
1966 Ford Taunus 20M P5

The Ford Taunus P5 came with a new body and new engines. The 17M now gets a V4 engine:

- 1.5-litre: 1498 cc, 60 PS (44 kW), 140 km/h (87 mph)
- 1.7-litre: 1699 cc, 65 or 70 PS (48 or 51 kW), 145 or 150 km/h (90 or 93 mph)

The 20M had a V6 engine with 1.8 litres and 82 PS (60 kW) or 2.0-litres (1998 cc) and 85 / 90 PS (63 / 66 kW), with a top speed of 158 or 161 km/h (98 or 100 mph).

==== Fourth generation 17M and 20M (P7; 1967–1968) ====
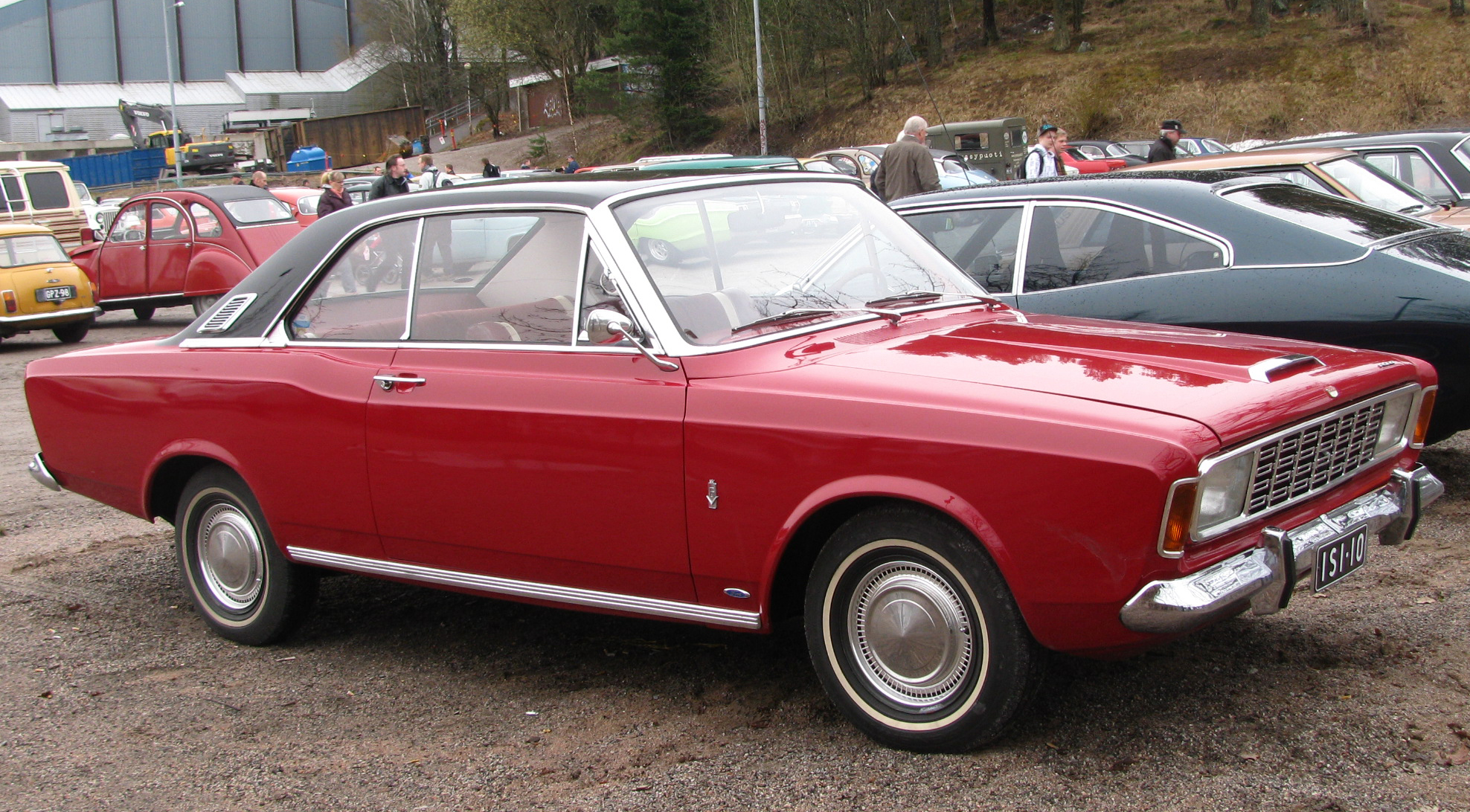
1968 Ford Taunus 20M P7 hardtop coupé

For the new Ford P7, there was a new body; engines and platform were carried over from the P5. Rear lights were no longer mounted at corners. The 20M-model had a fake air scoop on the bonnet and a new, bigger engine.

The engines of the 17M/20M P5 were continued, with only one addition on the top end. It was the

- 20M 2.3-litre: 2293 cc, 108 PS (79 kW), 170 km/h (106 mph)

==== Fifth generation 17M, 20M, 26M (P7b; 1968–1971) ====
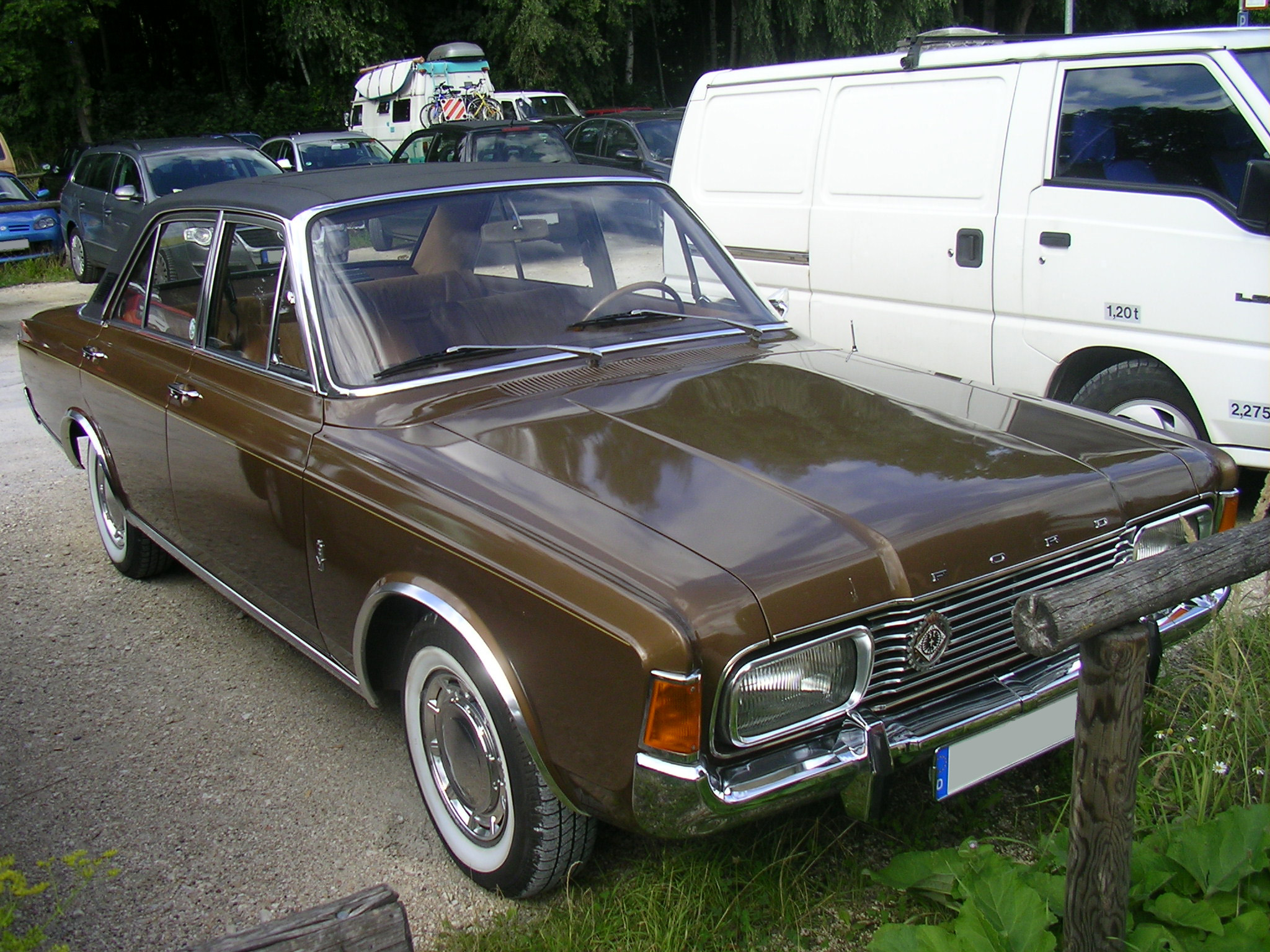
Ford 20M P7b four-door sedan

Shrinking sales of the P7 forced Ford to offer a restyled car only one year later, and the new car was again called P7. Rear lights again mounted on corners. Here, to avoid confusion, it was called P7.2, sometimes it is called P7b. The name "Taunus" no longer used.

The 26M, introduced in 1969, is the top-of-the-line version with a new bigger engine (2.6-litres), bigger brakes, dual headlights, power steering, and the most luxurious trim level. V6-engines were slightly revised. The engine programme is enlarged; now, two base engines (V4 and V6) in six displacement sizes and nine power stages are available:

- V4
  - 17M 1.5-litre: 1498 cc, 60 PS (44 kW), 135 km/h (84 mph)
  - 17M 1.7-litre: 1699 cc, 65 or 75 PS (48 or 55 kW), 140 or 150 km/h (87 or 93 mph)
- V6
  - 17M 1.8-litre: 1812 cc, 82 PS (60 kW), 153 km/h (95 mph)
  - 20M 2.0-litre: 1998 cc, 85 or 90 PS (63 or 66 kW), 155 or 160 km/h (96 or 99 mph)
  - 20M 2.3-litre: 2293 cc, 108 or 125 PS (79 or 92 kW), 170 or 180 km/h (106 or 112 mph)
  - 20M, 26M 2.6-litre: 2550 cc, 125 PS (92 kW), 180 km/h (112 mph), optional on 20M, but standard on 26M.

Ford 20M RS

The Ford 20M RS Coupé was made in Germany as a (2300 S) P7b and (2600) P7b. In the 1968 London-Sydney Marathon, Ford entered three Ford 20M RS from Germany and Belgium. In 1969, a Ford 20M RS won the Safari and occasionally a Capri was seen with works involvement.

This is the last specifically German Ford. In early 1972, it is replaced by the new Consul and Granada.

== Taunus TC (1970–1975) ==
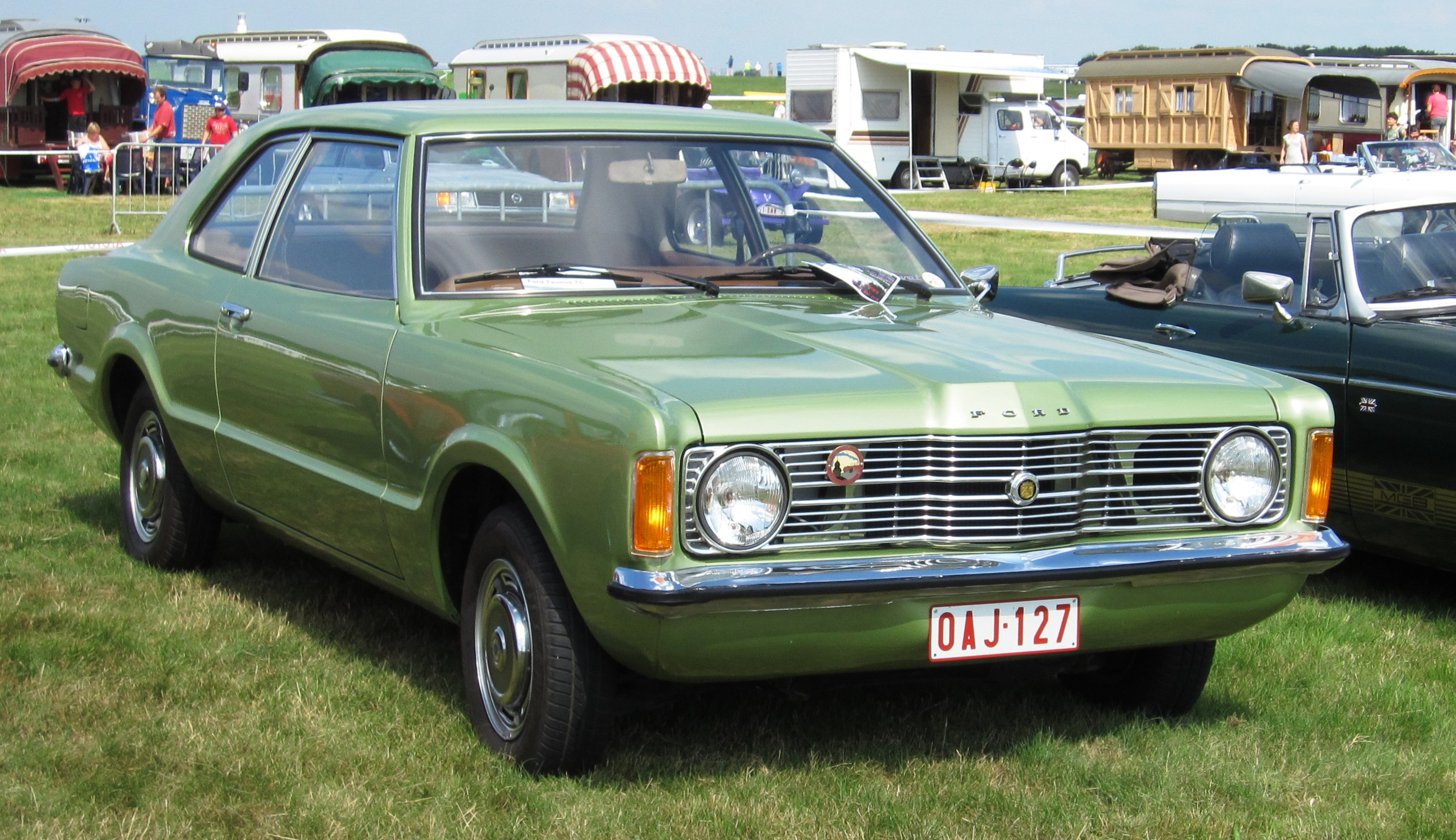
1970–1975 Ford Taunus Saloon (pre-facelift)

In 1970 a new Taunus, the Taunus Cortina (TC), was introduced. Ford offered a two- or four-door sedan or a five-door station wagon/estate (identified like previous Taunus estates as the Turnier). Between 1970 and 1975, for the first Taunus TC, a fashionable fast-back coupé was also included in the Taunus range.

This model also formed the basis of the Cortina Mk.III, but with different door skins and rear wing pressings from the "coke-bottle" styling of the Cortina. In addition, there was never a Cortina III equivalent to the fast-back bodied Taunus TC coupé. The Taunus TC and Cortina Mk.III were both developed under the auspices of Ford of Europe, and most major components including key parts of the bodyshell were identical.

== Taunus TC2 (1976–1979) and TC3 (1979–1982/1994) ==
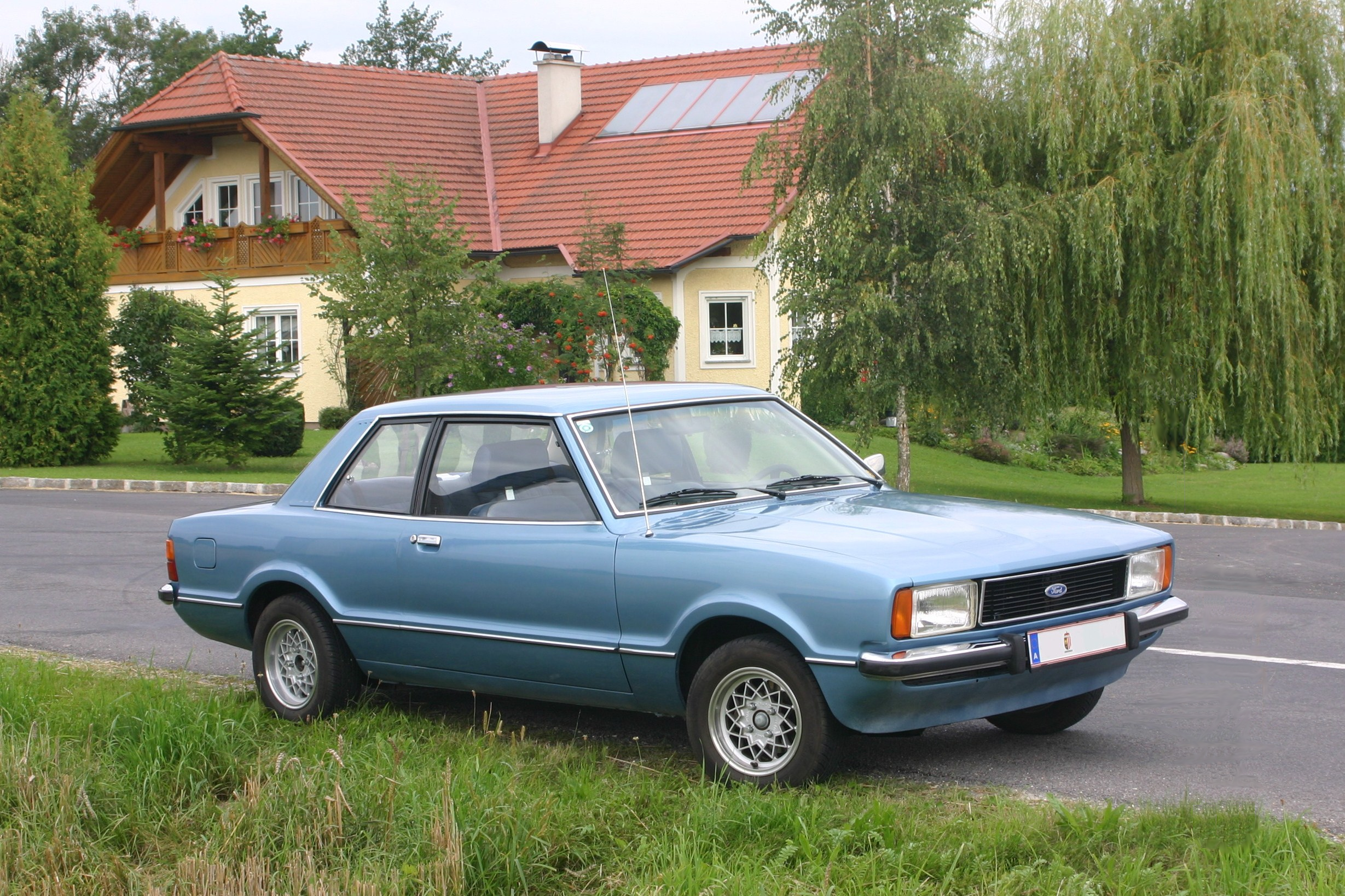
Ford Taunus TC2 (1976–1979)

At the end of November 1975, in time for the 1976 model year, production began of the Taunus series "GBTS". The Taunus and Cortina Mk IV were in most cases now almost identical, apart from regional variations (in terms of specification changes and trim levels).

The Taunus TC along with the Cortina Mk III and their successors have been produced in slightly updated forms in Europe, Argentina and widely across Asia by Ford or their local co-operators. Cortinas were also built in small numbers starting with the predecessor Cortina Mk II throughout the model series' European/east Asian lifespan under license by Korean automaker Hyundai. This led to the Cortina 80 at the end of its production life serving as a starting point for the first Hyundai Stellar which succeeded the Cortina line in South Korea, handing over some major technical components such as the steering rack and the transmission propelling shaft to the otherwise non-Ford successor.

In 1982 production of the Taunus ceased in Europe; it was replaced by the Ford Sierra. The Sierra carried over the Cortina/Taunus OHC Pinto Engines and RWD configuration but was otherwise an all new car with independent suspension all round.

== Production in Argentina and Turkey ==
The Taunus was produced in Argentina from 1974 up until the end of 1984, when the production assembly was sold to Turkey to manufacture the Otosan Taunus. The Turkish car, easily distinguishable because of its remolded front and back panels continued in production until 1994.

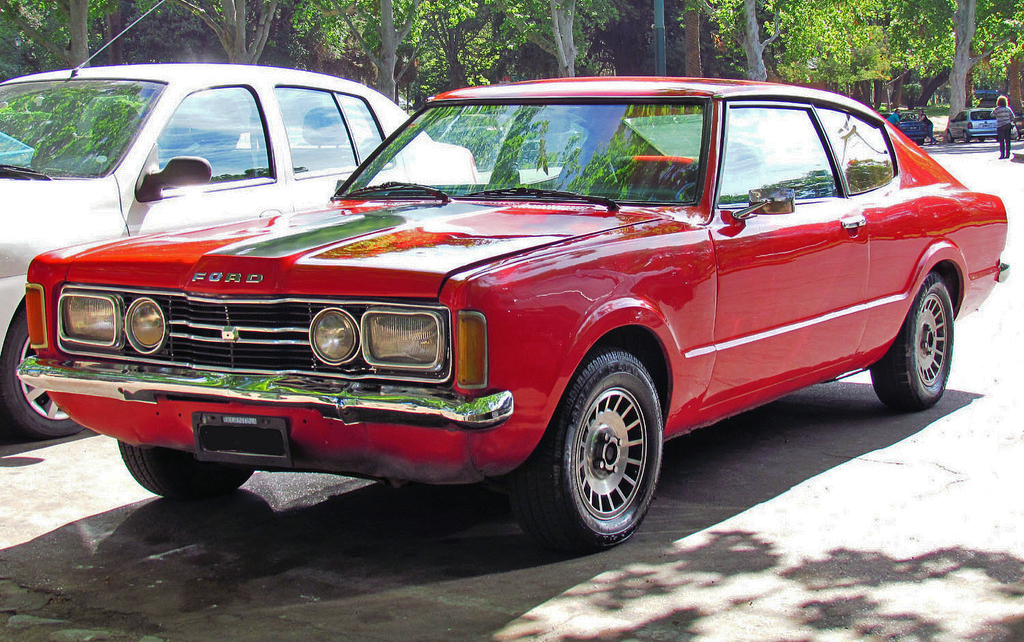
Ford Taunus 2300GT, exclusive for Argentina only as a "fastback coupé", built from 1974 up until the end of 1984

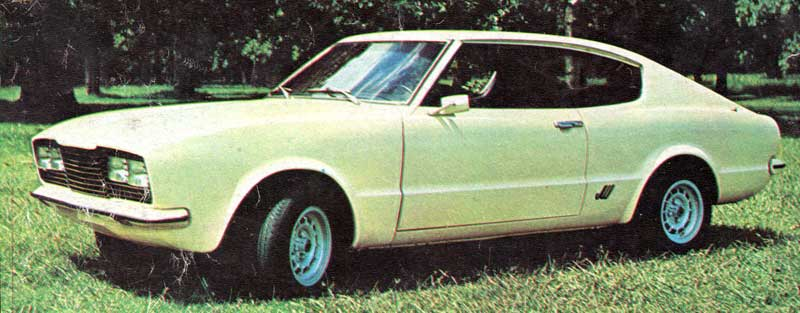
A special edition of the Ford Taunus, the Taunus JW produced in Argentina in 1977 by Winograd. It was based on the coupe version with some modifications to the front end.

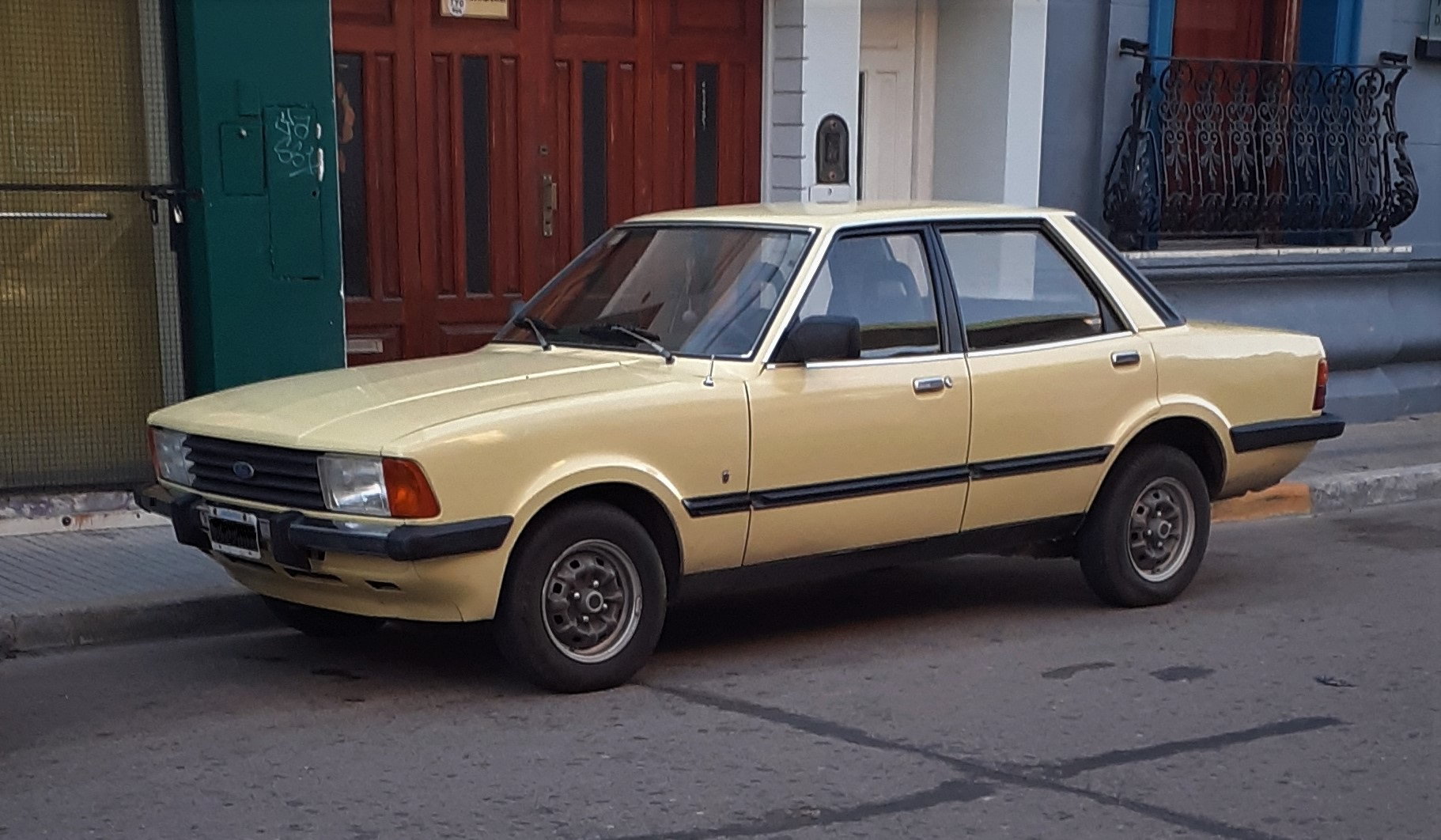
Argentinian Ford Taunus (1980)

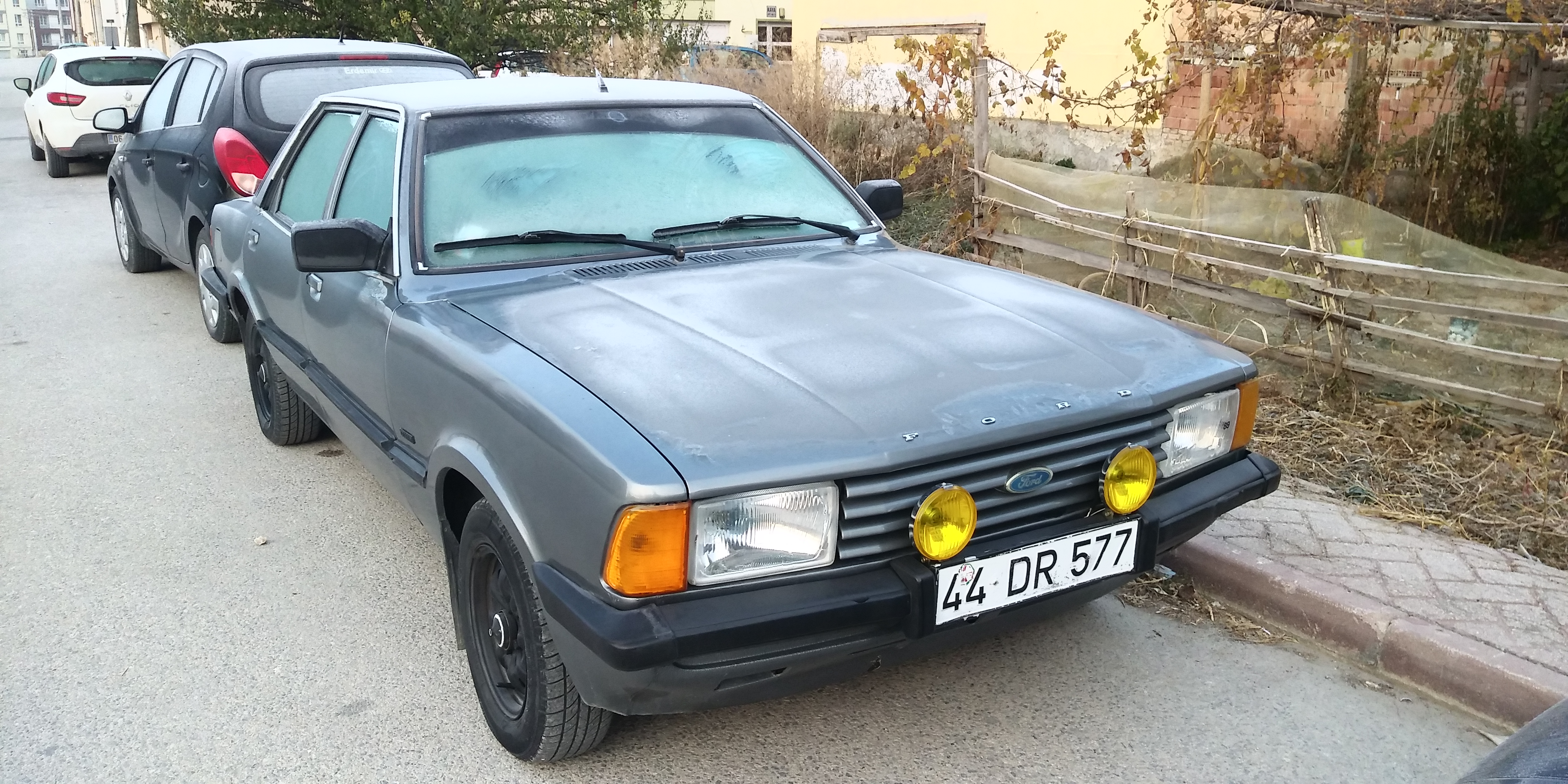
An early model of Otosan's Ford Taunus, which had the same trim as European versions

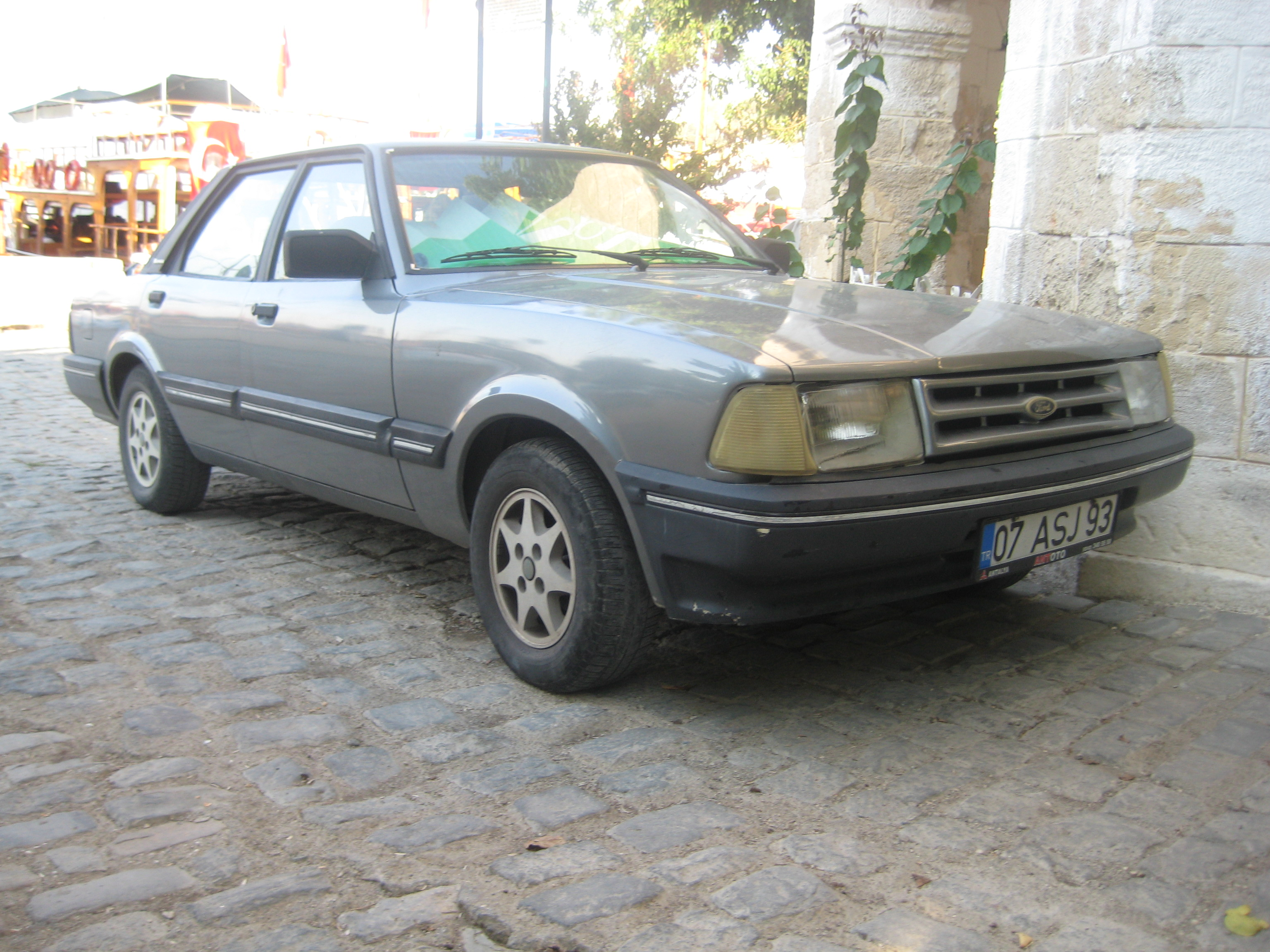
Ford Taunus (last edition, with different trim) produced in Turkey until 1994

== Literature ==
- Oswald, Werner (2003). Deutsche Autos 1945-1990, Band (vol) 3 (in German). Motorbuch Verlag. ISBN 3-613-02116-1.
