= Ford Taunus P4 =

Ford Taunus 12M
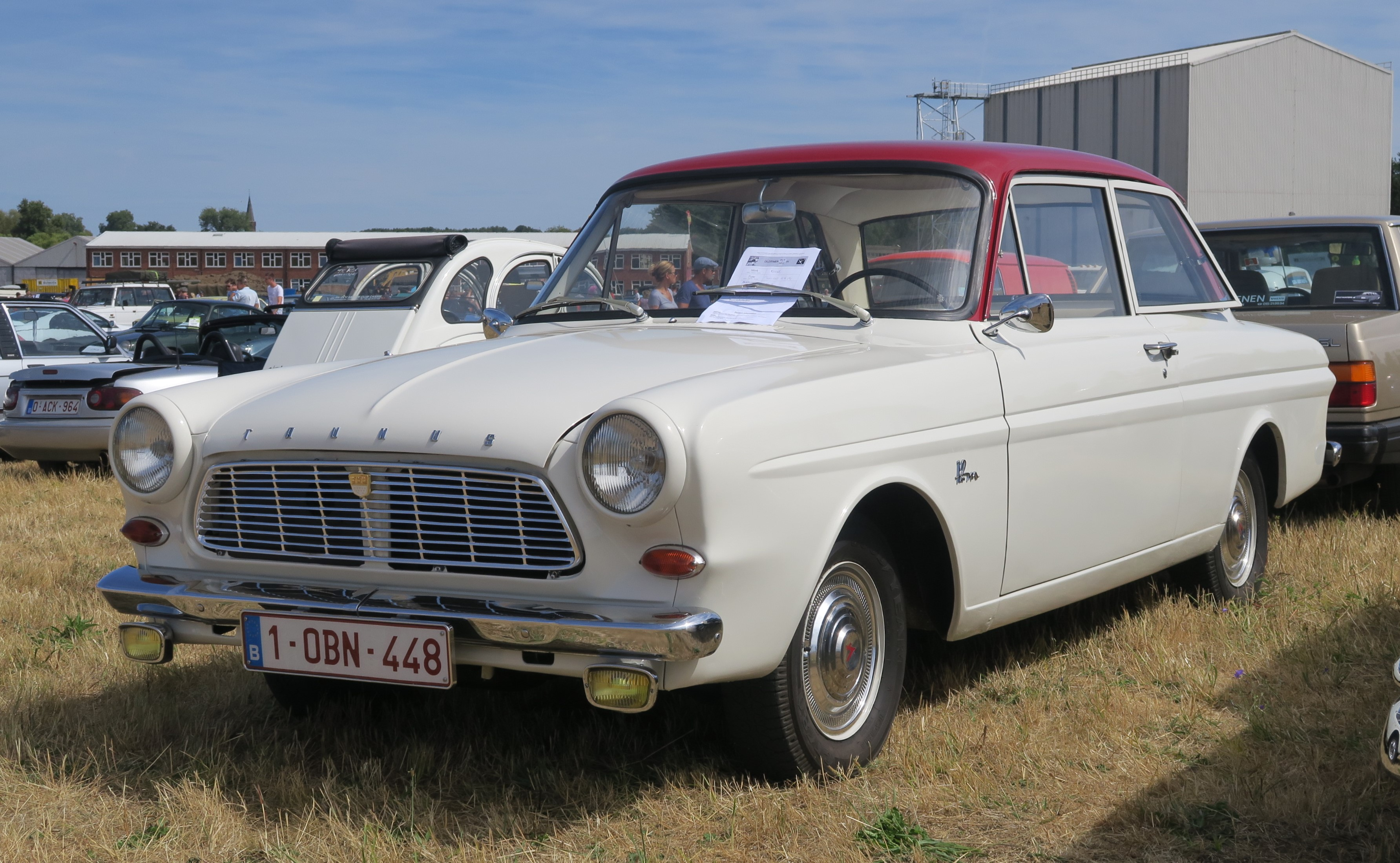

Overview
- Manufacturer: Ford Germany
- Also called: Ford Taunus P4; Ford Cardinal (cancelled)
- Production: September 1962 – August 1966
- Assembly: Germany: Cologne-Niehl; Belgium: Genk

Body and chassis
- Class: Large family car (D)
- Body style: 2-door or 4-door saloon; 3-door "Kombi" estate car; 2-door coupé; 3-door sedan delivery; 2-door coach-built (Karl Deutsch) cabriolet
- Layout: Front-engine, front-wheel drive

Powertrain
- Engine: 1183 cc V4; 1498 cc V4
- Transmission: 4-speed all-synchromesh manual with column-shift

Dimensions
- Wheelbase: 2,527 mm (99.5 in)
- Length: 4,248 mm (167.2 in)
- Width: 1,594 mm (62.8 in)
- Height: 1,458 mm (57.4 in)
- Curb weight: 860–870 kg (1,896–1,918 lb)

Chronology
- Predecessor: Ford Taunus 12M P1
- Successor: Ford (Taunus) 12M/15M P6

The Ford Taunus 12M is a small family car produced by Ford Germany from September 1962 to August 1966.

The Taunus 12M name had been used for the car's predecessor and would be used for subsequent Ford models, which is why the 12M introduced in 1962 is often retroactively identified as the Ford Taunus P4. It was the fourth newly-designed German Ford to be launched after the war and was known within the company as Ford Project 4 (P4) or the Ford Taunus P4. It was the first Ford with front-wheel drive.

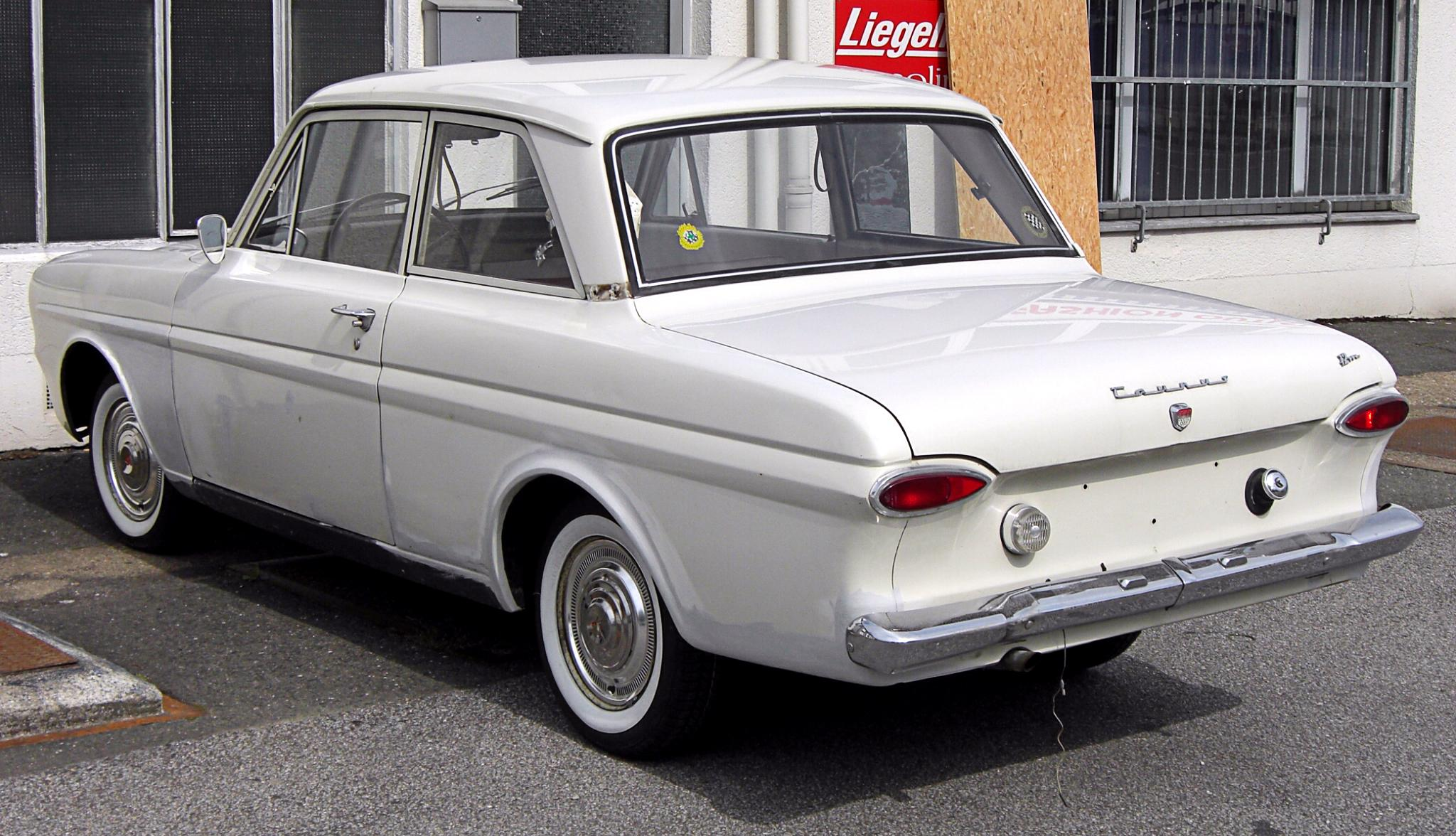

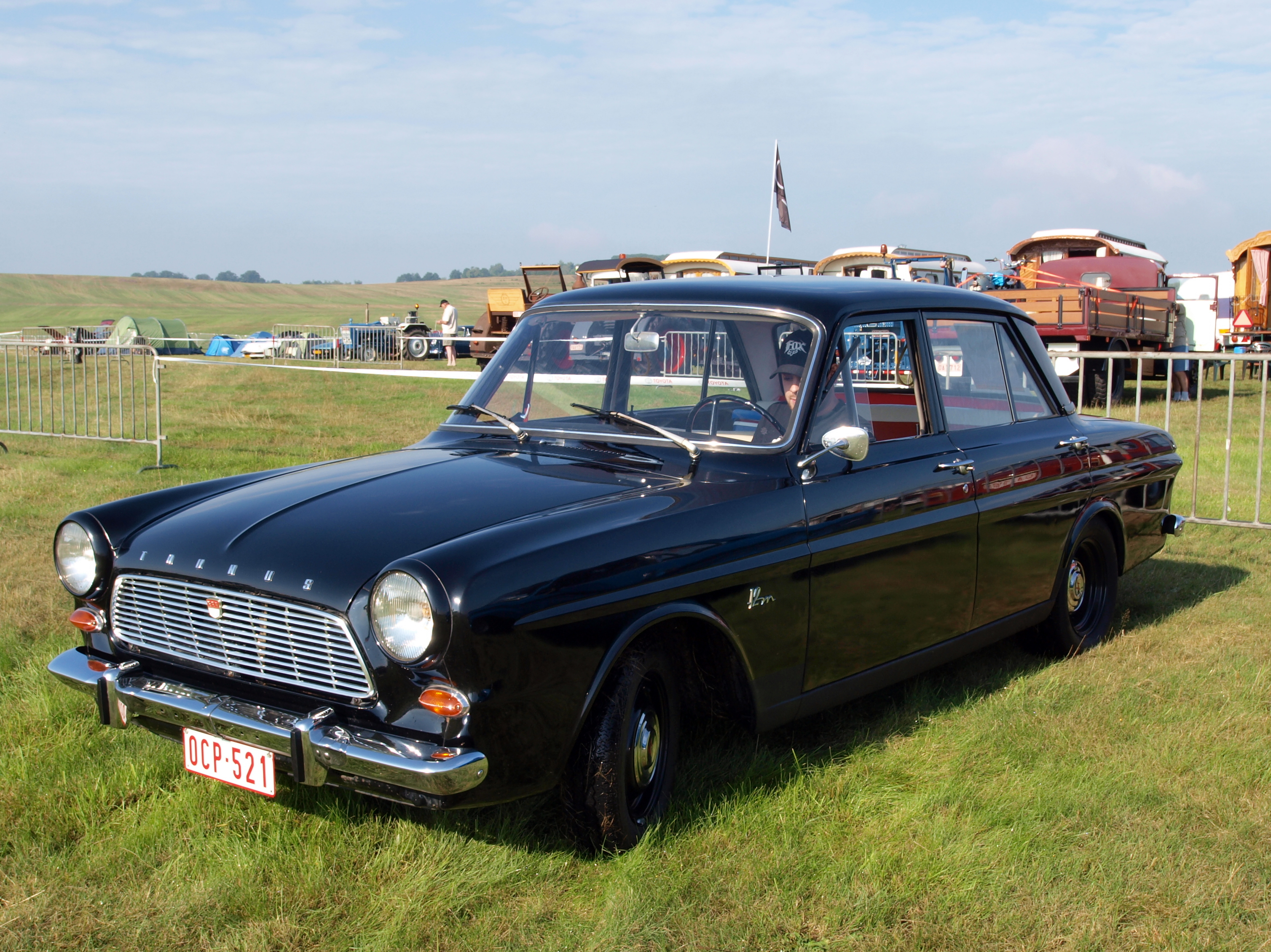
With the P1 replaced by the P4, the Taunus 12M was now available with four doors.

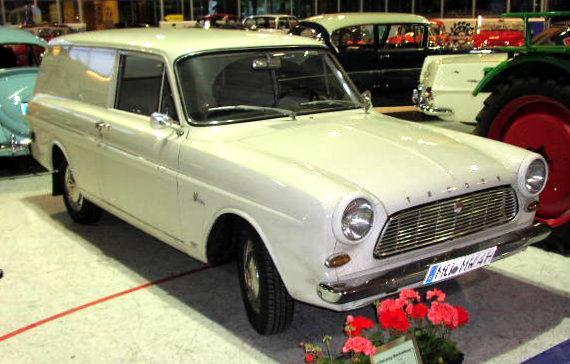
The estate also provided the basis for a sedan delivery.

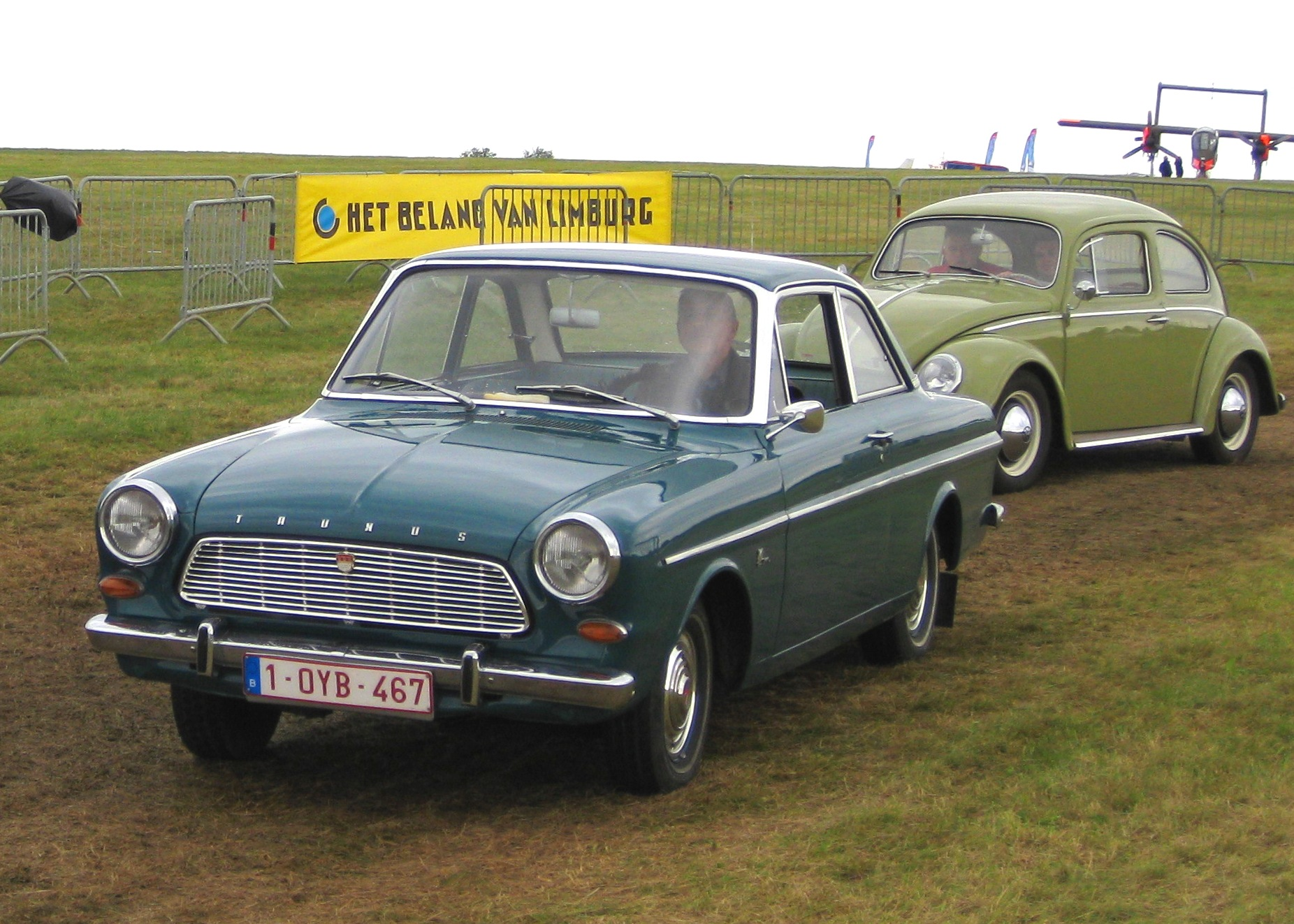
Ford Taunus 12M Coupé

The car was not designed by Ford of Germany but by its US parent company, and was to be built and sold in the US as the Ford Cardinal — an all-American competitor to the Volkswagen. US production plans were later cancelled, and in 1960 Ford of Germany received a modern, fully developed new design which they adapted for German conditions as a replacement for their own outdated Ford Taunus P1.

== North American design ==
The 1952 Ford Taunus had received a stylish new body, but its rear axle and suspension were little changed from the 1939 Ford Taunus G93A, and its engine was essentially still the British-designed side-valve from the 1935 Ford Eifel. The P4, however, was technically innovative, with a newly-developed compact V4 engine that would become the basis for engines designed and produced by Ford of Germany for twenty years. The Taunus P4 was also a front-wheel drive design at a time when West German automakers, with a few exceptions, were still avoiding the technology.

The decision not to build the Ford Cardinal in North America was made after the car had been prepared for production, and was the result of a review of “marketing opportunities” in the US. In 1960 a prototype was delivered to Ford in Cologne. The form that came off the production line at Köln-Niehl two years later would be unchanged. The single all-red rear lamp cluster was seen as a tell-tale sign of the car's US origins, as separate red brake lamps and amber directional indicators were increasingly common on European cars. The dished steering wheel was another feature not normally found in European designs of the time.

== Market launch ==
The Taunus P4 came to market in September 1962 to a reasonably positive reception. Its North American designers had created a car that was far larger and more spacious than the standard set by the Volkswagen which dominated the small saloon class in Germany. A series of teething problems suffered by the P4 suggested that adaptation of the car to German conditions had been somewhat rushed. Over its four-year model life the Taunus 12M was produced at an average rate of more than 150,000 per year, which made a useful contribution to the sales figures but did little to affect the dominance of the small car sector market by the Volkswagen Beetle, which was held back chiefly by a shortage of production capacity.

== Engine and running gear ==
The new V4 engine was mounted in the longitudinal, "overhung" front-wheel drive configuration pioneered by Auto Union/DKW, putting the engine in the far front of the car. The V4 incorporated a balance shaft to dampen some of the imbalance resulting from the unconventional positioning of the four crank pins in relation to the three bearings for the crankshaft. Reviewers still found the V4 "rougher" and noisier than comparable inline engines. The water pump and thermostat were housed in a sealed unit permanently protected by antifreeze. The fan was thermostatically controlled, which was still unusual at this time. An eye catching feature under the bonnet in 1964 was rocker covers color-coded by engine type. 40 PS (29 kW) engines were coded green, 50 PS (37 kW) blue and 65 PS (48 kW) red. The 55 PS (40 kW) version was discontinued at the same time, in favor of the more powerful red unit.

The modern V4 engine placed Ford of Germany in the unfamiliar position of setting the pace, and the company was able to sell the unit to other smaller European manufacturers. This was the engine that Saab later used for their V4 models after they abandoned the Saab two-stroke engine. Ford's compact V4 engine also found its way into the Matra 530 sports car.

Power was transferred through a single dry plate clutch to the front wheels. The four-speed manual gear box featured synchromesh on all four ratios, and was controlled by means of a column-shift. The universal joints necessary to combine power transmission with steering and suspension functions involved engineering and materials technologies regarded as "leading edge" at the time, although front-wheel drive in lighter cars with less powerful engines had become mainstream in Germany over the three previous decades, following the pioneering application of the various technologies involved in Auto Union's DKW-badged small cars.

An unusual feature of the Taunus P4 involved the front suspension arms being connected to the engine/gearbox block, which served as a structural member. Above them, the transversely mounted leaf-springs were linked to a cross-member which was attached to the floor pan and thereby part of the unibody bodyshell. In autumn 1964 the various elements were rearranged to make it possible to soften the front suspension significantly: after this it was reported that the level of engine vibration reaching the driver was reduced. However, these changes also caused a reduction in roll-resistance at the front of the car which now tended to lean excessively when cornering. This effect was countered by the substitution of firmer dampers, while two additional support connections were added at the front in order to make the steering and tracking more precisely controllable.

Disc brakes replaced drums on the front axle at the end of 1964. Ford's larger sister model, the Ford Taunus P3, had received this same upgrade the previous year.

The Taunus P4 used a 6 volt electrical system which was becoming rare in Germany, although the contemporary Volkswagen Beetle had not yet changed to a 12 volt system.

== Body ==
Taunus P4s came as two or four-door saloons. A three-door estate car was also offered, which did not use the "Turnier" appellation from the larger 17M estate, although the "Turnier" name would later be applied by Ford of Germany to all of their estates. The estate also provided the basis for a panel van. In addition Ford offered a factory built two-door coupé which was in effect simply a two-door saloon with a shortened roofline and a steeply raked rear window. The coupé provided exactly the same interior space as the two-door saloon up to the level of the car's waistline, but head-room for those on the back-seat was severely restricted.

The rear light units had an all-red cover and a single chamber each. As in many other europeen cars of the time tail light and brake light was combined in two-filament bulbs. One filament with 5 W power served as tail light and the other, at 21 W, was lit during braking, emitting a brighter shine. While most other cars of that time had an additional chamber or a separate lamp unit for the turn indicators the Ford Taunus P4 had also the indicator function included in the single bulb. The high-power filament was lit intermittently when the indicator switch was set. When braking and turning occurred simultaneously, one high-power filament on the appropriate corner was lit periodically while the high-power filament on the opposite side shone continuously. This concept was usual in the USA at the time and required a special indicator relay.

== Evolution ==
The principal changes during the car's four-year production run took place under the skin, and received only muted publicity since many involved suspension modifications which a slower and more careful development process might have made unnecessary.

A significant change was the transfer of production from Ford's German plant to a newly opened modern plant at Genk, in Belgian Limburg, an hour to the west of the company's Cologne head office. Initially the P4 was built exclusively at Ford's Cologne plant, but from August 1963 the P4 became Genk's first volume model, and by the time the P4 was replaced three years later almost all the P4s were being produced there. The Genk plant subsequently became the lead plant and then the sole plant for production of the Ford Sierra before being retooled for the launch of the front wheel drive Mondeo.

== Record breaker ==
Over the course of 142 days in 1963 a standard specification Ford Taunus 12M travelled 356,273 kilometres (221,378 mi) around a disused race track at Miramas at an average speed of 106.48 km/h (66.16 mph).

== Replacement ==
The Taunus P4 was replaced in 1966 by the Ford Taunus P6, which generally followed the same architecture but was slightly larger and therefore even more spacious than the Volkswagen, Germany's top selling small car in this period.

The Taunus P4 notched up sales of 672,695 during its four-year production run. The sales total was a significant improvement on the numbers achieved by its P1 predecessor, but the overall market size also grew during the early 1960s. Within its class the Ford 12M was pushed into third place on the domestic market by the reappearance of Opel in the segment with their new Opel Kadett which also appeared in 1962. The Kadett was replaced by an improved model after only three years, but over that time its production volume of 649,512 fell less than 5% short of the total production achieved by the Ford over four years.

== Technical data ==
	12M (1962)	12M 1.5 L (1962)	12M TS (1962)	12M TS (1964)
Engine:	four-stroke V4			
Engine displacement:	1,183 cc (72.19 cu in)	1,498 cc (91.41 cu in)		
Bore × stroke:	80 mm × 58.9 mm (3.1 in × 2.3 in)	90 mm × 58.9 mm (3.5 in × 2.3 in)		
Max power at rpm:	29.4 kW (40 PS) at 4500 rpm	36.8 kW (50 PS) at 4500 rpm	40.5 kW (55 PS) at 4500 rpm	47.8 kW (65 PS) at 4500 rpm
Max torque at rpm:	78 N⋅m (58 lb⋅ft) at 2400 rpm	108 N⋅m (80 lb⋅ft) at 2400 rpm	108 N⋅m (80 lb⋅ft) at 2300 rpm	
Compression ratio:	7.8:1	8.0:1	8.5:1	9.0:1
Valve gear:	Gear-driven cam-in-block, two overhead valves per cylinder with pushrods and rocker shafts			
Cooling:	Water cooled, with pump and thermostatically controlled fan, permanently sealed unit with antifreeze (6.5 L (1.4 imp gal; 1.7 US gal))			
Transmission:	Fully synchronised 4-speed manual, column shift			
Front wheel suspension:	Lower wishbone, upper transverse leaf spring, telescopic dampers, antiroll bar			
Rear wheel suspension:	Live axle, semi-elliptical leaf spring, telescopic dampers, antiroll bar (until 1964)			
Steering:	Recirculating ball			
Electrical system:	6 volt			
Body:	Steel with welded floor pan			
Track front/rear:	1,245 / 1,245 mm (49.0 / 49.0 in)			
Wheelbase:	2,527 mm (99.5 in)			
Tyre size:	5.60–13 (saloon and coupé), 5.90–13 (Kombi)			
Length: Width: Height:	4,248 mm (167.2 in); 1,594 mm (62.76 in); 1,458 mm (57.40 in)		4,322 mm (170.2 in); 1,594 mm (62.76 in); 1,458 mm (57.40 in)	
Empty weight (saloon):	860 kg (1,896 lb)		870 kg (1,918 lb)	
Top speed:	123 km/h (76 mph)	130 km/h (81 mph)	139 km/h (86 mph)	147 km/h (91 mph)
