= Genk Body & Assembly =

Former EuroFord assembly plant in Belgium

Coordinates: 50.9217°N 5.5072°E

Ford logo

Genk Body & Assembly was a Ford automobile factory in Genk, Belgium, just over an hour to the west of the company's European head office in Cologne, Germany. The site spanned 6,135,630 square feet (140.9 acres). The plant employed approximately 4,300 workers when it closed in 2014.

The plant opened in 1964. The first mainstream car built there was Ford's first front-wheel drive volume model, the Ford Taunus P4. Later on, the plant focused on producing mid-sized family cars including the company's Sierra and Mondeo models.

== Models built ==
Image	Model	Years	Number	Image	Model	Years	Number
	Ford Taunus P4/12M	1963-1966	314,270		Ford Mondeo II	1996-2000	1,200,069
	Ford Taunus P5/17M	1965-1966	13,765		Ford Transit VI	2000-2004	384,238
	Ford Transit II/III/IV/V	1965-2000	1,857,635		Ford Mondeo III	2000-2007	1,418,515
	Ford Taunus P6 12M/15M	1966-1970	518,602		Ford S-MAX I	2006-2010	235,890
	Ford Escort	1968-1970	258,205		Ford Galaxy III	2006-2010	120,192
	Ford Taunus P7/20M	1969-1970	19,534		Ford Mondeo IV	2007-2010	567,582
	Ford Taunus	1970-1982	2,695,796		Ford Mondeo IVb	2010-2014	348 825
	Ford Sierra I	1982-1992	2,741,713		Ford S-MAX Ib	2010-2014	194 685
	Ford Mondeo I	1992-1996	1,362,538		Ford Galaxy IIIb	2010-2014	111 123

== Closure ==
Ford announced in October 2012 that it was planning to close its Genk plant at the end of 2014 in response to longstanding over-capacity problems in Europe, as part of a larger closure plan that will see the manufacturer's European capacity decreased by 20%, with further capacity cuts planned should the company not succeed in returning to higher European sales volumes. The next generation of the Ford Mondeo was assembled, for the European market, at the Valencia plant.

Reports in March 2013 indicated that agreement with the workers' representatives would see Ford paying out an average of €144,000 (at the time equivalent to US$187,500) for each of the 4,000 workers to be laid off. It was noted that this was significantly below the US$202,700 per worker that had been the price reportedly paid by General Motors at the closure in 2010 of their Antwerp facility.

At the end of 2016 it was estimated that the decontamination of the site would cost €11.4 million.

== See also ==
- List of Ford factories
