= Ford Taunus P1 =

Ford Taunus 12M (1952–1962) Ford Taunus 15M (1955–1959)
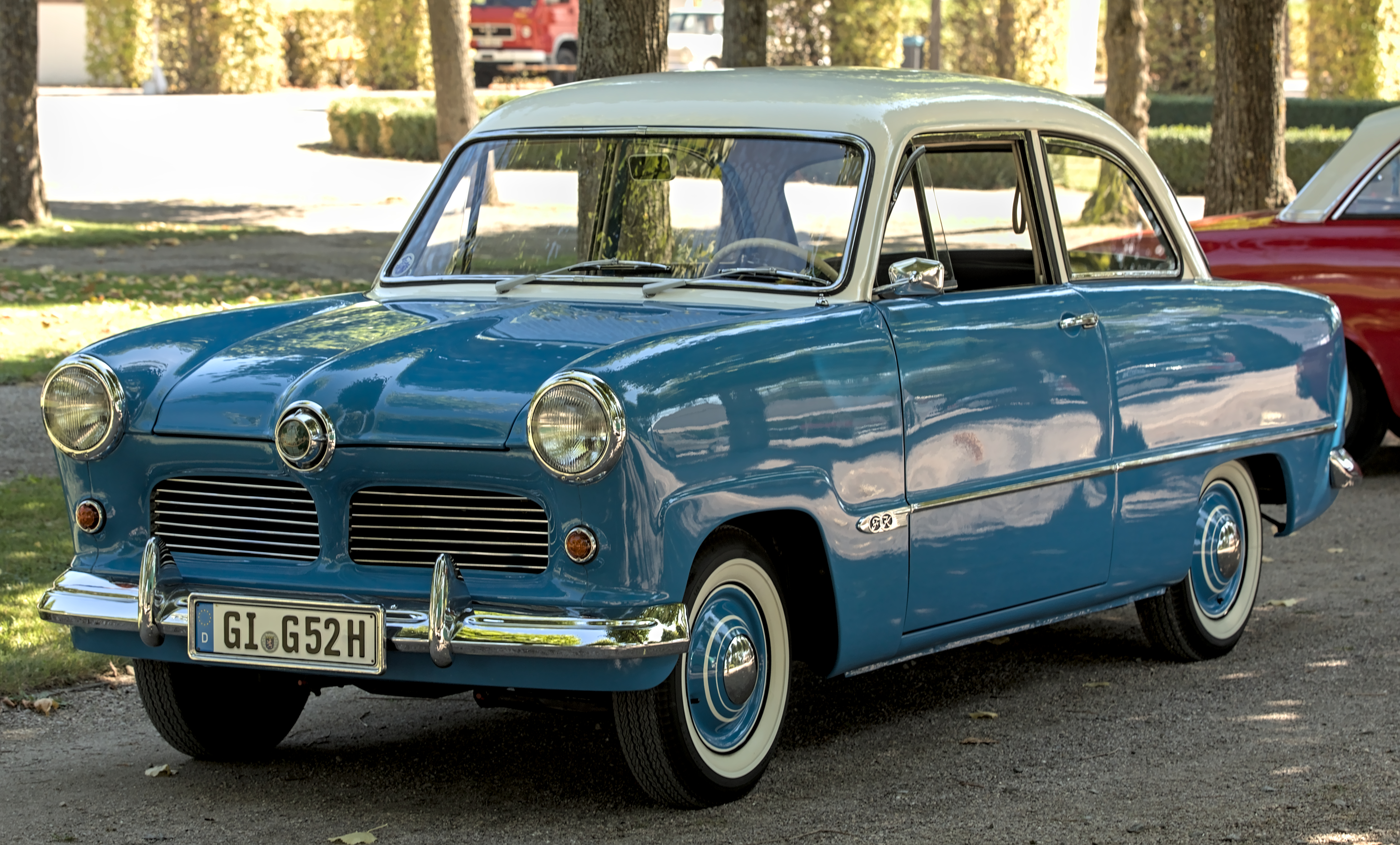
- Weltkugeltaunus (1952–1958)

Overview
- Manufacturer: Ford Germany
- Also called: Ford Taunus P1 "Weltkugeltaunus" (Globe Taunus) till 1958 "Seitenstreifentaunus" (Side-stripes Taunus) from 1959
- Production: January 1952 – August 1962 (12M); January 1955 – September 1959 (15M)
- Assembly: Germany: Cologne-Niehl

Body and chassis
- Class: Large family car (D)
- Body style: 2-door saloon 3-door "Kombi" estate car 2-door cabriolet

Powertrain
- Engine: 1172 cc Ford Sidevalve engine I4, water-cooled (12M); 1498 cc I4, overhead valve, water-cooled (15M)
- Transmission: 3-speed manual 4-speed manual optional from 1953

Dimensions
- Wheelbase: 2,489 mm (98.0 in)
- Length: 4,060 mm (159.8 in)
- Width: 1,580 mm (62.2 in)
- Height: 1,500 mm (59.1 in)
- Curb weight: 850–930 kg (1,874–2,050 lb)

Chronology
- Predecessor: Ford Taunus "Buckeltaunus"
- Successor: Ford Taunus 12M P4

The Ford Taunus P1 is a small family car which was produced by Ford Germany from 1952 until 1962. It was marketed as the Ford Taunus 12M, and, between 1955 and 1959, as the larger-engined Ford Taunus 15M. The company produced a succession of Ford Taunus 12M models until 1970, as the name was applied to a succession of similarly sized cars, but the first Taunus 12M models, based on the company's Taunus Project 1 (P1), remained in production only until 1962. In that year the Taunus P1 series was replaced by the Taunus P4 series.

At its launch, the car placed Ford ahead of the pack, being unusually modern in terms of the bits that showed. It was one of the first new cars to appear in Germany since before the war, and featured a radical ponton format "three box" body as pioneered (at least in Germany) by the 1949 Borgward Hansa 1500. The three-box car body format would soon become mainstream, but when the Ford Taunus 12M appeared in 1952 competitor manufacturers including Opel, Volkswagen and Auto Union were still competing with models based closely on designs originating in the 1930s.

== Globe Taunus / "Weltkugeltaunus" (1952–1959) ==
=== Development ===
The planning for Ford Germany's new ponton bodied passenger car began in 1949. Several aspects of the car's development reflected the advantages and the disadvantages of running a business with management decisions necessarily split between two continents at a time when even international telephone calls needed to be pre-booked.

The original plan for the strikingly modern design came from Ford in the USA who drew up a proposal based on the ponton format Champion model introduced to the US auto-market a few years earlier by Studebaker. The Studebaker design had already proved highly influential on the domestic programs of mainstream US automakers. Cologne based production engineers adapted the US proposal for the German market. The Studebaker featured a large roundel directly above the front grille on which was displayed the propeller of an airplane. The Ford Project 1 also featured a prominent roundel at the front of the car, but in place of the Studebaker's propeller design, the Ford roundel featured a hemispherical depiction of half a globe. This bold and unusual decoration led to the new car becoming known as the "Weltkugeltaunus" (Globe Taunus).

The proposal from Ford in America called for a monocoque construction, following the lead (in Germany) of the 1937 Opel Olympia. Ford of Germany had no experience of this construction method, having spent most of the 1940s concentrating on building light trucks. Project 1's predecessor, the Ford Taunus designed in the 1930s, had had its body built by Ambi Budd, an independent specialist pressed steel body builder in Berlin until 1948, and after the Berlin firm had its surviving plant crated up and shipped to the Soviet Union, Ford had in 1948 been driven to having Ford Taunus bodies produced by competitors and specialists from northern Germany, Volkswagen and Karmann. Ford's Cologne management sought cooperation from other German automakers with developing the processes necessary for producing the monocoque Project 1 model, but the other German automakers had priorities of their own, and in the end it was with support from Ford of France that the production lines for German Ford's project 1 were set up at the company's Cologne plant. In due course, and not before a certain amount of confusion concerning the naming of the car, Ford's Project 1 was released to the market as the Ford Taunus 12M. It proved a success. By the time the half globe was removed from the car's nose, 247,174 of the 12M version had been sold along with 127,942 of the subsequently introduced Ford Taunus 15Ms.

=== The name ===
The naming of the car is another area which may have been complicated by the way that responsibilities were shared between different management teams in two continents divided by an eight-hour time difference and the Atlantic Ocean. The immediate postwar era was seen as a new beginning for a newly divided Germany with, in the west, new borders, a new constitution and a new political class. The monocoque bodied new model for 1952 also represented a new beginning for Ford, so identifying it as Ford of Germany's Project 1 (P1) was evidently uncontentious.

Ford Taunus 12M/15M production (units):

- 1952 30,650
- 1953 35,888
- 1954 42,631
- 1955 58,456
- 1956 64,872
- 1957 50,734
- 1958 29,688
- 1959 52,648
- 1960 94,408
- 1961 61,474
- 1962 34,014

Totals ( saloons/sedans & estates/kombis):
1952–1959 Taunus 12M 1.2L: 215,265
1954–1958 Taunus 15M 1.5L: 134,127
1959–1962 Taunus 12M 1.2L: 126,581
1959–1962 Taunus 12M 1.5L: 69,191

Not included in these totals are the saloons/sedans converted into two seater cabriolets by the Cologne based coach builder Karl Deutsch.

In the 1930s Ford of Germany had, along with Opel, pioneered the use of model names that would have positive associations for customers. While Auto Union customers were enticed to buy cars with names such as DKW F8 and BMW were inviting customers to be seduced by names such as BMW 326, Ford were selling the Ford Köln, named after the major cathedral city Cologne, where the Ford factory was located, as well as the Ford Eifel and the Ford Taunus named after hilly areas of great natural beauty. For Project 1, Ford Germany evidently intended to invoke another hilly region of natural beauty, and the name "Ford Hunsrück" was thought uncontroversial for a successor to the Ford Taunus. However, the "Hunsrück" name was blocked shortly before launch, possibly because of problems encountered explaining the pronunciation of "Hunsrück" to management colleagues in Dearborn. This left the name Taunus, and it was proposed to name the new car "Taunus 12 Meisterstück" in order to differentiate it from the existing Ford Taunus which was by now an aging model that would nevertheless continue to be listed in parallel with the new model throughout most of 1952. However, it transpired that the name "Meisterstück" ("Masterpiece") was unavailable for any Ford vehicle, having been patent-protected by a German bicycle manufacturer. Therefore, by the time Ford's radical new car came to market it arrived under the name "Ford Taunus 12M". The "12" in the name referred to the engine size of 1.2-litres and the "M" was the only part of the "Meisterstück" name available to Ford.

=== The engines ===
During development it was intended that the car would be powered by a 1,498 cc engine. This was in many respects the engine that had originally been intended for the previous Ford Taunus first produced in 1939, but now it was to be developed into an ohv unit. However, cost constraints intervened, and when the new Taunus 12M appeared in 1952 it was powered by the 1,172 cc side-valve unit that had powered not merely its predecessor, but also its predecessor's predecessor, the Ford Eifel of 1935.

By 1952 sidevalve engines were already seen as old fashioned. In an analysis undertaken of the models shown at the 1952 Paris Motor Show it was noted that 48 of the cars exhibited were fitted with engines employing overhead valves while only 6 featured sidevalve engines. That Ford were still powering their entry level Taunus P1 with a sidevalve engine ten years later, in 1962, would leave the model looking badly outclassed under the bonnet/hood.

=== The body and running gear ===
The two-door modern slab sided Ford Taunus that appeared in January 1952 with an old fashioned engine married to a stylish new body was connected with the road using fashionably small 13-inch wheels which will have saved on cost and maximised the space available for passengers and their luggage. Individually suspended front wheels marked a contrast with the approach taken with the original Taunus, but in 1952 the rigid rear axle was all too familiar to Ford's existing German customers. The old Taunus had acquired the option of a four-speed gear box in 1950, but the new model at its 1952 launch came only with the older three-speed box, controlled using a column-mounted lever. (Until the 1960s European cars in this class never offered the option of an automatic gear change.) In the early years all the cars, regardless of equipment level, and whether saloon/sedan, or cabriolet bodied, came with a single bench seat across the full width of the car in place of the individual front seats fitted by most European manufacturers: this was a matter in respect of which the Taunus 12M was seen to reflect its manufacturer's North American parentage and thereby conferred a certain glamour at a time when the United States was a widely accepted role model across much of Europe and especially in West Germany.

A maximum 38 PS (28 kW) of power was delivered to the rear wheels. This was a useful increase on the 34 PS (25 kW; 34 hp) claimed for the previous model, and may have reflected a higher compression ratio and increases starting to come through across Europe in respect of available fuel octane levels.

In May 1953 the Taunus P1 finally became available with a four-speed gear box, though only as an optional extra. It was also at this point that a 3-door kombi/estate version joined the range. A cabriolet version had been offered since December 1952, being the result of a conversion by a coach building specialist based, like Ford, in the Cologne area and called Karl Deutsch

=== Broadening the range ===
Poor workmanship on the early cars was a source of some disappointment. Nevertheless, fairly soon (and in the absence of much direct competition during its early years on the German market) the Ford Taunus 12M, with its roomy modern body came to be seen as a high quality product, but on launch it was 37% more expensive than the 1952 price of the predecessor model. By this time another 1200 cc small car, the Volkswagen Beetle, was also gaining a foothold in the market place, and while the Volkswagen could not compete with the new Taunus 12M on cabin space, its lower price offered a compelling argument in a country still impoverished after the traumas of war and national defeat. By the end of 1952 the old Taunus had disappeared from the Ford showrooms, and in December 1952 management decided to offer a stripped-down version of the new Taunus 12M, with all the chrome trimmings and various other "unnecessary" elements removed. In place of the US-style front bench seat the basic version had two individual front seats which comprised simple non-adjustable steel frames with a thin coating of plastic fabric. In place of the US-style column-mounted gear change the stripped-down version featured a gear lever in the middle of the floor between the two front seats: this was considered very old fashioned at the time. The basic Ford Taunus 12 was offered only as a two-door saloon/sedan. The stripped down Taunus 12 nevertheless retailed at more than 10% less than the price of a Ford Taunus 12M. And for only forty marks extra, the buyer of the basic car could upgrade his gear-change mechanism to the coveted column-mounted device.

=== Facelifts and upgrades ===
In 1955 the Taunus 12M received its first facelift. The formerly split chrome grille was replaced by a simplified single piece grille. The prominent hemispherical globe design above the grille at this time remained in position, however. By now the base price for the Ford Taunus 12M had been reduced to below 6,000 Marks, and with incomes on the rise nationally the stripped down Ford Taunus 12 was quietly dropped from the range.

From 1957 the Taunus 12M joined other German automakers in offering the automatic "Saxomat" clutch as an option

In 1958 the wide chrome bars of the radiator grille were replaced by a less flamboyant grille. But the globe design directly above the grille lasted another year.

=== Taunus 15M (1955–1959) ===
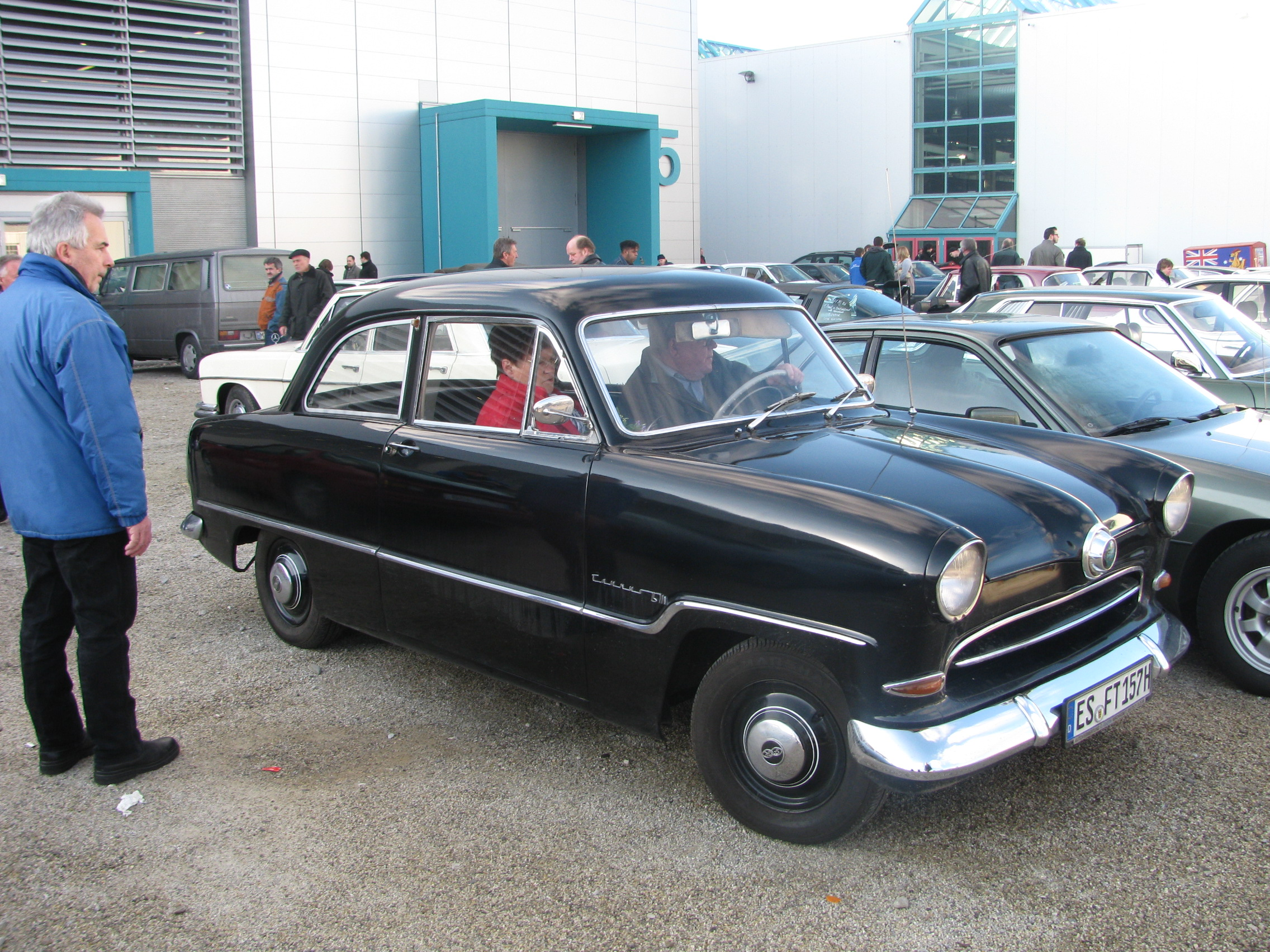
Ford Taunus 15M

Early in 1954 the Ford Taunus finally received the 1500 cc engine that had been planned for successive Taunus models ever since 1939. Hitherto the Ford Taunus 12M had competed as a large (if rather underpowered) car in the sector increasingly led by the Volkswagen Beetle. Its size had always invited comparison with larger cars such as the Opel Olympia Rekord, the Borgward Isabella, the Fiat 1400 and the Peugeot 403. What these cars had in common, however, was an engine of approximately 1500 cc, which was something that till now the Taunus had conspicuously lacked.

Ford in Germany did not have the investment cash available to develop a new model of their own in the rapidly growing market segment of middle-sized (by the standards of the time and place) family cars, but by installing a 1498 cc engine in the Taunus 12M they were able to announce almost as a new car the Ford Taunus 15M which could be profitably produced and sold alongside the car with which it shared virtually every component apart from the engine block and cosmetic touches, including a strongly differentiated front grille, intended to emphasize the differences between the cars to potential customers.

The new engine was based on the unit that had originally been developed with a side-mounted camshaft for launch in the 1939 "Buckeltaunus". Now, however, the originally planned side-valve configuration was replaced, for the first time on a German Ford, with overhead valves. This reflected developments also underway in England where a new ohv-engined Ford Consul had appeared in 1951. The crankshaft on the new German Ford engine was formed hollow rather than from a solid casting, which was seen as a way to save weight.

The Taunus 15M was offered with exactly the same choice of bodies as the 12M. It was also offered with the option of a "Saxomat" automatic clutch, married to the three-speed gearbox (though not with the four-speed box).

=== Broadening the range more ===
In September 1955, at the same as the Taunus 12M received its update, Ford also introduced a Taunus 15M de luxe. This top-line model was identified by a particularly elaborate front grille and a two-tone paint scheme. Various luxury features hitherto unavailable or else offered only as optional extras were included in the price for buyers of the Ford Taunus 15M de Luxe. These included items such as the windscreen washer, reversing lights, tubeless tires, vanity mirrors in the sun visors and a headlamp flasher. Many of these will have been regarded as relatively mainstream in North American cars, which will have added trans-Atlantic glamour to the Taunus 15M in a country where, especially in the south of Germany, the continuing presence of large numbers of US troops enabled Ford's customers to be far more up to date than most other Europeans with trends in the US auto market.

Following the 1958 facelift, the Taunus 15M and 12M, for the first time shared the same front grille: by now Ford management were evidently losing enthusiasm for the strategy of promoting the Taunus 15M, as far as possible, as though it was a separate model.

== Side-stripes Taunus /"Seitenstreifentaunus" (1959–1962) ==
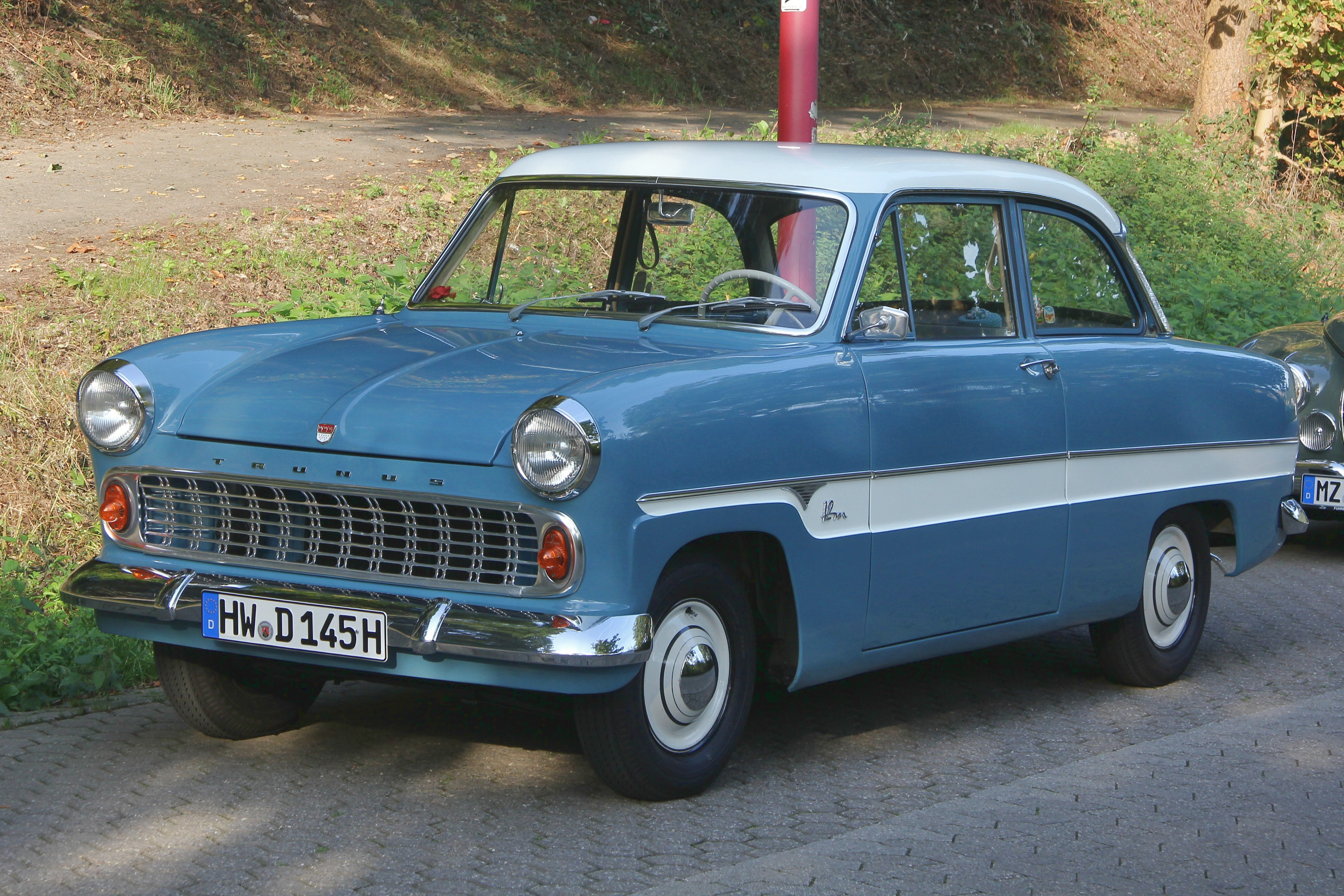
Streifentaunus (1959–1962)

By 1959, Ford's US management had decided that the earlier policy of selling as separate models the Taunus 12M and Taunus 15M no longer made sense. This was partly in response to the lack of effectiveness with which the 15M model had been competing against Opel. General Motors were evidently cash rich at this time and Opel, between 1953 and 1957, offered an extensively redesigned or upgraded version of their Opel Olympia Rekord every year, and were dominating the middle-weight sedan sector of the German auto market. However, another important game changer had been the introduction in 1957 of Ford's second new post-war model, the Project 2, known to customers at the time as the Ford Taunus 17M. The larger and flamboyantly styled Taunus 17M was seen as a much more powerful competitor to sell against the successful Opel and against the Borgward Isabella, which acquired something approaching iconic status in the later 1950s.

For 1959, Ford's smaller Taunus no longer needed to try to compete half a class up. The Taunus 15M was withdrawn from sale. A redesign of the front of the car saw the prominent globe symbol removed, leaving a more restrained front for the Taunus 12M which competed now without distraction in the small car category, a sector increasingly dominated by Volkswagen's Beetle. Having lost its defining globe mascot, the smaller Taunus acquired a thick painted stripe down each side, slightly below the level of the car's waist. It thereby acquired its "Seitenstreifentaunus" (Side-stripes Taunus) soubriquet.

By this time, the Ford Taunus 12M's twenty-five-year-old underpinnings were becoming uncomfortably obvious, and the car was having to compete largely on price. However, that also meant that in terms of the amount of car offered for the money it represented something of a bargain. The 1959 entry-level price of 5,555 marks was barely more than that asked for the much smaller and more cramped Volkswagen.

As Ford's management had feared, the arrival of newer models from competitor manufacturers was leaving the once fashionable Taunus 12M languishing in the sales charts. Its once broad niche between the small relatively cramped Volkswagen and the growing class of middle-weights was under increasing pressure from entry-level versions of more recently introduced models from Opel, Fiat and Peugeot. In September 1959, with the 15M itself deleted from the range, Ford responded to the intensifying competition by offering the larger 1.5-litre engine from the 15M in the 12M for a supplementary payment of only 110 marks. Cars with the larger engine were now identified simply by the name "Taunus 12M Super". The Taunus 15M name would not reappear until 1966 when it was needed for certain versions of the Ford Taunus P6.

== Replacement ==
By 1961, despite its three-box body shape, the Taunus 12M had become outdated and outclassed, with an engine, suspension system and gear-box which still followed pretty closely their original 1935 designs.

In August 1962 production of the Taunus P1 came to an end, after 555,463 cars had been built. The car was replaced by the Taunus P4 which retained the "Taunus 12M" name, but applied it to a Ford's first German built front-wheel drive model, powered by a modern compact V4 engine.

During its three-year production run, between 1959 and 1962, 245,614 of the Stripes Taunus models were produced. 56,843 of these were fitted with the larger 1.5 liter motor.

== Technical data ==
	Taunus 12M (1952)	Taunus 15M (1955)
Engine	4-Cylinder Four-stroke / inline	4-Cylinder Four-stroke / inline
Displacement:	1,172 cc (71.52 cu in)	1,498 cc (91.41 cu in)
Maximum Power:	28 kW (38 PS) at 4250 rpm	40 kW (54 PS) at 4250 rpm
Max. Torque:	74 N⋅m (55 lb⋅ft) (7,56 mkp) at 2200 rpm	120 N⋅m (89 lb⋅ft) at 2400 rpm
Compression ratio:	6.8:1	7.0:1
Valvegear:	Side-valve	OHV
Top speed:	112 km/h (70 mph)	128 km/h (80 mph)
Weight (empty):	850 kg (1,874 lb)	930 kg (2,050 lb)
