= Ford Taunus G93A =

Ford Taunus G93A (1939–1942) Ford Taunus G73A (1948–1952)
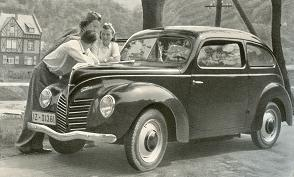

Overview
- Manufacturer: Ford Germany
- Also called: "Buckeltaunus"
- Production: G93A: April 1939 – February 1942; G73A: November 1948 – January 1952
- Assembly: Germany: Cologne-Niehl

Body and chassis
- Class: Large family car (D)
- Body style: 2-door saloon a wide range of coach-built bodies, including cabriolets and station wagons became available after 1949

Powertrain
- Engine: 1172 cc Ford Sidevalve engine I4, water-cooled
- Transmission: 3-speed manual with synchromesh on upper two ratios. 4-speed manual offered on some models after 1950

Dimensions
- Wheelbase: 2,387 mm (94.0 in)
- Length: 4,080 mm (160.6 in)
- Width: 1,485 mm (58.5 in)
- Height: 1,600 mm (63.0 in)
- Curb weight: 840–1,040 kg (1,852–2,293 lb)

Chronology
- Predecessor: Ford Eifel
- Successor: Ford Taunus P1

The Ford Taunus G93A is a small family car that was produced by Ford Germany between 1939 and 1942 in succession to the Ford Eifel. It was the first car developed at Cologne by Ford Germany which previously had built cars originated by Ford businesses in the US or the UK. Production began on 30 April 1939, with the first car exhibited to the public in June 1939, less than six months before the outbreak of war in Europe.

In 1948 the car reappeared as the Ford Taunus G73A, and remained in production until 1952. This was the first (and until the 1970s the last) Ford Taunus to feature a fastback shape: in this application the rather severe slopes enforced by squeezing North-American style fast-back styling onto a relatively short wheelbase was not universally admired: the car became known as the "Buckeltaunus" (Hunchback Taunus).

== Ford Taunus G93A (1939–1942) ==
On 30 April 1939 Ford Cologne began to manufacture the Taunus, a mid-size car intended to slot into the range between the little Ford Eifel and the company's big V8 models. The car was presented to the public in June 1939. Although the structure of the car did not follow the revolutionary monocoque structure heralded by the Opel Olympia, the Taunus did have its body welded to the chassis rather than having the two elements simply bolted together. Essentially, the platform was a stretched floorpan and frame inherited from its predecessor Eifel. The advertised price at launch was 2870 Marks, but customers had the option of paying an extra 22 Marks for a shatterproof windscreen.

=== The body ===
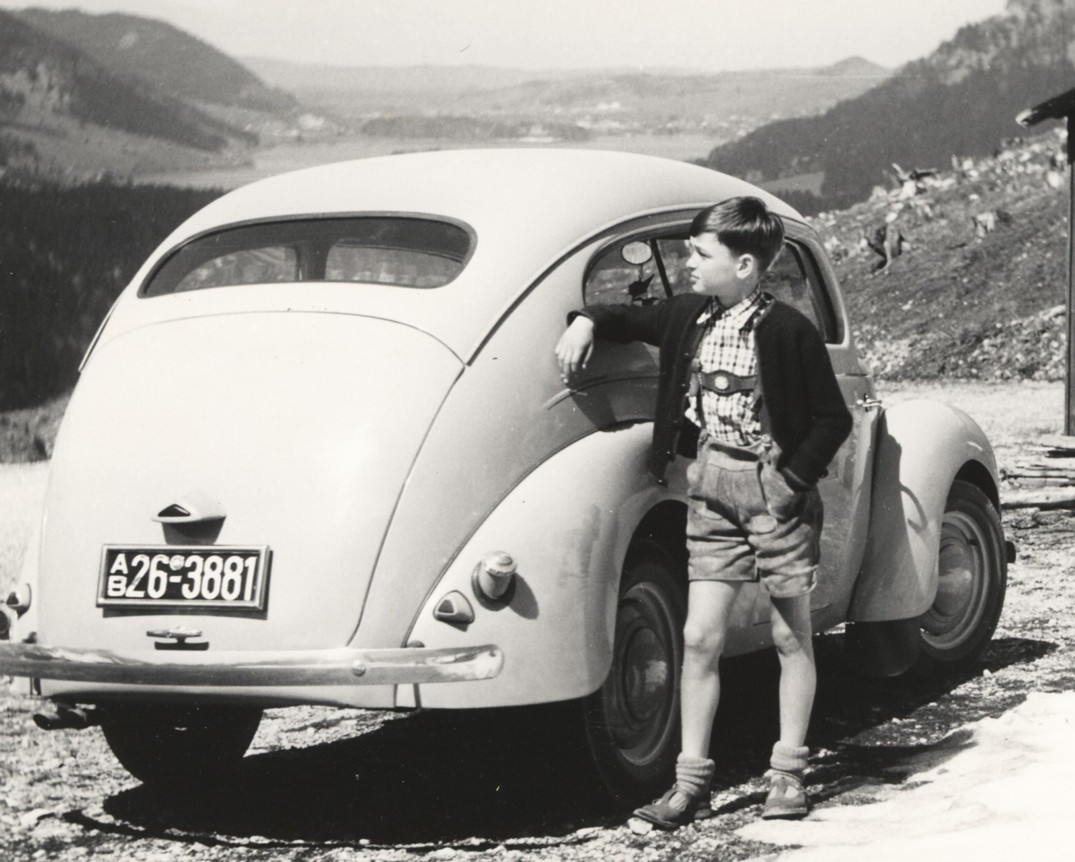
The US-style fast back form of the Taunus called for a longer wheelbase than the car's position in the market could justify. The result was a car which acquired the soubriquet Buckeltaunus ("Hunchback Taunus").

Stylistically the new car followed the 1930s fashion for streamlining, but with a North American flavour inspired by the Lincoln-Zephyr of the time. Design work was carried out at the Ford headquarters in Detroit mainly between the then recently appointed chief of design E.T. "Bob" Gregorie and Lincoln-Mercury division manager Edsel Ford, the son of Henry Ford. The bodyshell was supplied from the Berlin plant of pressed steel experts, Ambi Budd. Like the Eifel, the Ford Taunus came with rigid axles, but with the innovation of hydraulic brakes.

=== The engine ===
The Taunus was designed to take a 45 PS (33 kW; 44 hp) 1.5-litre side-valve engine developed from the 1.2-litre unit used in the Eifel. However, in March 1939 the government, anticipating war, introduced restrictions whereby Ford were permitted to produce only a single standardised engine in the class of cars covered by engine sizes between 1.2 and 2.0 litres, and so the Taunus used the smaller 1,172 cc engine (also known as English Sidevalve) carried over from the Eifel model. This was essentially the same unit that Ford would fit in the Ford Taunus P1 (and, at their Dagenham plant the Ford Anglia) until 1959.

In the 1939 Ford Taunus the car's 1,172 cc unit delivered a claimed 34 PS (25 kW), matched to a three-speed transmission controlled with a centrally mounted lever. Drive was transmitted to the rear wheels.

=== The war ===
The German auto industry did not undergo the same very rapid switch-over to war production as that experienced in Britain, but passenger car production in Germany was nevertheless restricted by government policy, and there was never more than a single prototype to represent the company's original intention to offer a cabriolet version of the Taunus G93A. The pre-war car was produced only as a two-door saloon/sedan with rear-hinged doors.

As the war continued, Ford became increasingly important as a producer of light trucks to support the war effort, and in February 1942 passenger car production came to an end at the Ford plant. Only 41 of the cars were assembled at the Cologne plant in 1942, but production had held up well through much of 1940 and by the time passenger car production ended 7,100 Taunus G93As had been produced.

== Ford Taunus G73A (1948–1952) ==
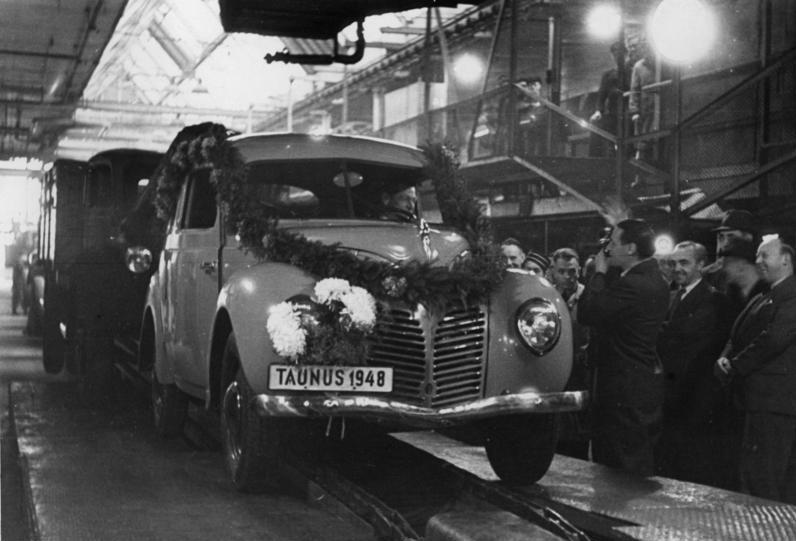
In November 1948 the first Ford Taunus G73A emerged from Ford's Cologne factory. The celebratory garland does not conceal the fact that very little distinguished the 1948 Taunus G73A from the prewar Taunus G93A

After the war, with other German auto-plants destroyed by bombing or crated up and shipped to the Soviet Union, the priority for the occupying powers at Ford's plant was for the continued production of light trucks. However, even in 1946 various detailed improvements had been built into the prewar Taunus design. Two years later, in May 1948, the new Ford Taunus G73A was exhibited at the Hanover Export Fair.

The tooling for the pressed-steel bodywork had during the war remained in Berlin with the US owned body builders Ambi Budd, and after lengthy negotiations with the Soviet military authorities was eventually released. Due to lack of available space at Ford's Cologne plant, production of the first 1948 cars was subcontracted to Volkswagen in Wolfsburg and Karmann in Osnabrück, but in November 1948 the entire production process was taken in house by Ford. 182 Taunus sedans and 144 light deliveries were built during 1948. At this stage, as in 1942, only a single body style was available. The 1948 Ford Taunus was a small fast-back saloon with two rear hinged doors, and available only in Night Shadow Grey, presumably reflecting paint availability in the aftermath of war.

=== Broadening the range ===
In 1949 Ford added a Taunus version with body panels fitted only as far back as the A-pillars, and several alternative body shapes became available, added by traditional coach-builders such as Karmann of Osnabrück, Drauz of Heilbronn and Plasswilm in Cologne. Coach-built Ford Taunus versions include two- and four-seater cabriolets with two doors, a special four-door cabriolet for use by police forces, small three-door station wagons and even four-door taxis.

=== Upgrades in 1950 and 1951 ===
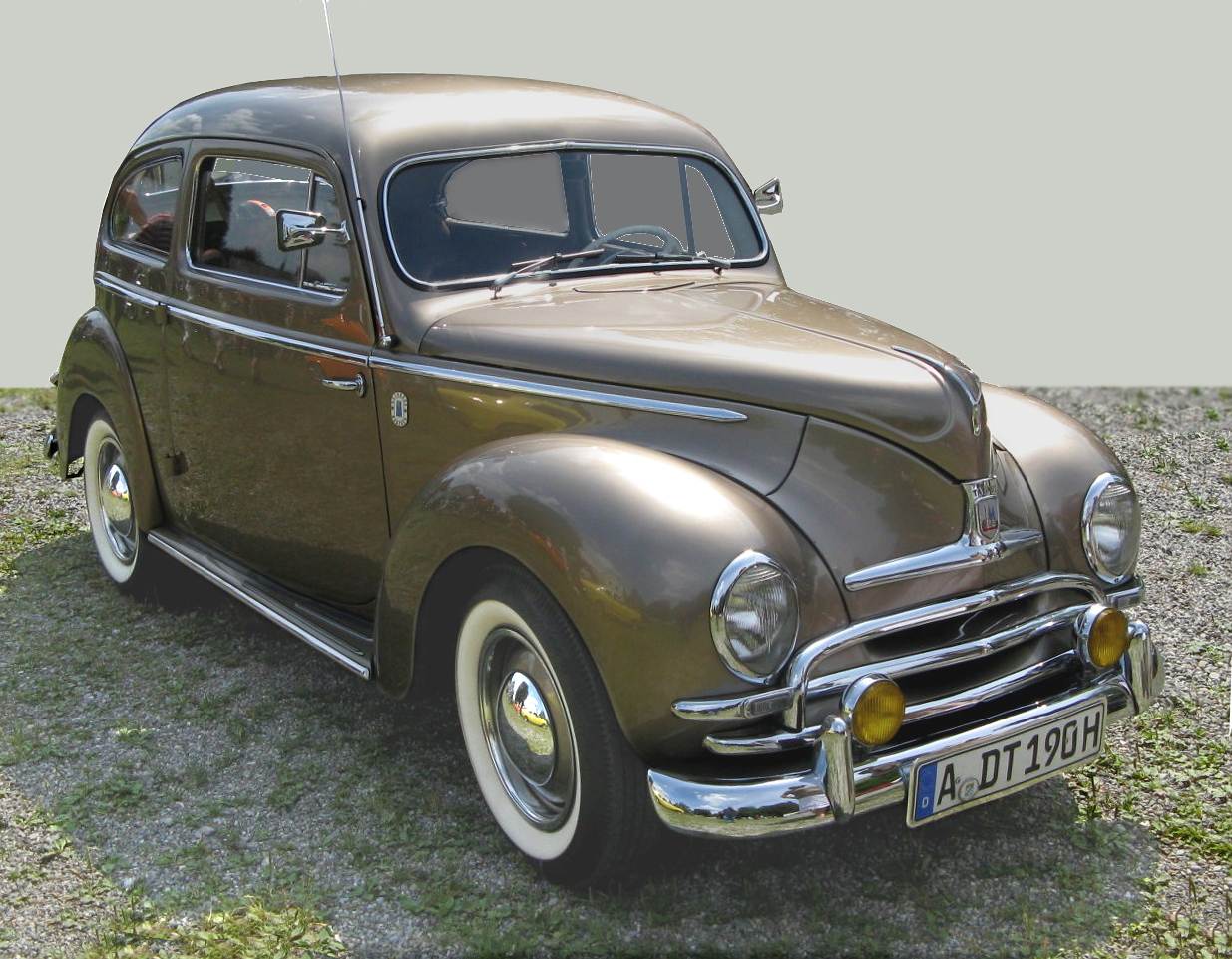
In its final years the "Buckeltaunus" acquired a one-piece windscreen and a lot of chrome; here a Taunus de Luxe

In May 1950 Ford introduced the Taunus Special, which featured a four-speed gear change controlled with a column-mounted lever. Externally the "Special" made extensive use of chrome, notably on an enlarged front grille and on the bumpers. The rear window was enlarged and flashing-light direction indicators replaced semaphore-style flippers.

January 1951 saw the introduced of a Taunus de Luxe, with a one-piece windscreen and many extras.

=== Technical ===
Technically the Taunus G73A was little changed from the 1939 G93A, retaining the familiar 1,172 cc side-valve engine first seen in the 1935 Ford Eifel. With gasoline/petrol availability in Europe restricted to low-octane fuels, the 34 PS (25 kW) maximum power output was also unchanged, supporting a claimed top speed of 105 km/h (65 mph). It was not possible to adjust valve clearances and engines typically only lasted for 80,000 km (50,000 mi).

Until 1950 all the cars came with a three-speed transmission incorporating synchromesh on the top two ratios. The gear boxes were prone to problems, especially regarding the second gear, and in order to rebuild the gearbox it was necessary first to remove the engine or, better still, the back axle.

Rigid axles front and back were suspended using leaf springs. The drive shaft was enclosed in a steel tube and featured only a single universal joint, positioned just behind the gearbox. The rear wheel bearings were positioned directly on the rear axle. The overall rear axle assembly seems to have been unusually simple, but the resulting stresses gave rise to a shortened axle life.

The hydraulically operated simplex brakes were operated via a single circuit, which was usual at the time. The handbrake cable was prone to rust.

The 6-volt electrical system was normal for small cars of the time, as was the requirement for an oil change every 1,500 km (roughly 1,000 miles) and a larger inspection every 4,500 km (very roughly 3,000 miles).

== Replacement ==
In January 1952 the successor model, Ford's ponton format Taunus P1 went on sale, although availability of the old G73A model continued until autumn: by this time 76,590 had been produced.

== See also ==
- 1940 Ford

== Sources ==
- Rosellen, Hanns-Peter: "… und trotzdem vorwärts", 1. Auflage, Zyklam-Verlag, Frankfurt / M. (1986), ISBN 3-88767-077-9
- Rosellen, Hanns-Peter: Ford-Schritte, 1. Auflage, Zyklam-Verlag, Frankfurt / M. (1987/88), ISBN 3-88767-079-5
- Oswald, Werner: Deutsche Autos 1945 – 1975, 2. Auflage, Motorbuchverlag Stuttgart (1967)
