= Morris Eight =

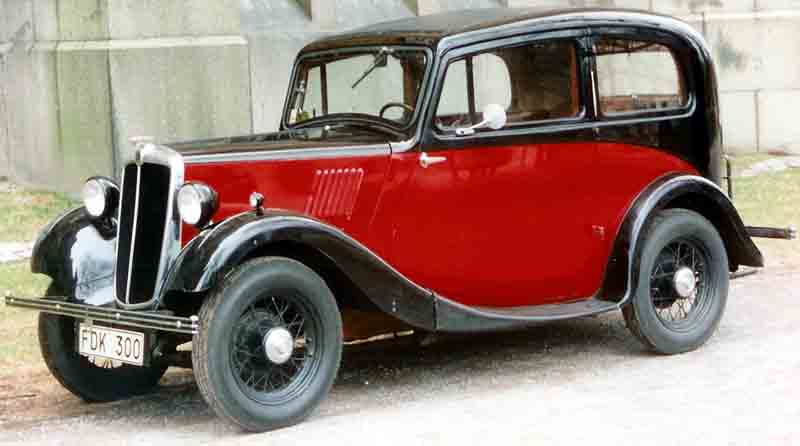
- 2-door saloon

Overview
- Manufacturer: Morris
- Production: 1935–1948
- Assembly: United Kingdom: Cowley, Oxford (Cowley plant); Australia: Sydney

Body and chassis
- Class: Small family car (C)
- Layout: Front-engine, rear-wheel-drive

Chronology
- Predecessor: Morris Minor (1928)
- Successor: Morris Minor MM

The Morris Eight is a small family car produced by Morris Motors from 1935 to 1948. It was inspired by the sales popularity of the Ford Model Y, styling of which the Eight closely followed. The success of the car enabled Morris to regain its position as Britain's largest motor manufacturer.

== Morris Eight Series I ==
Morris Eight
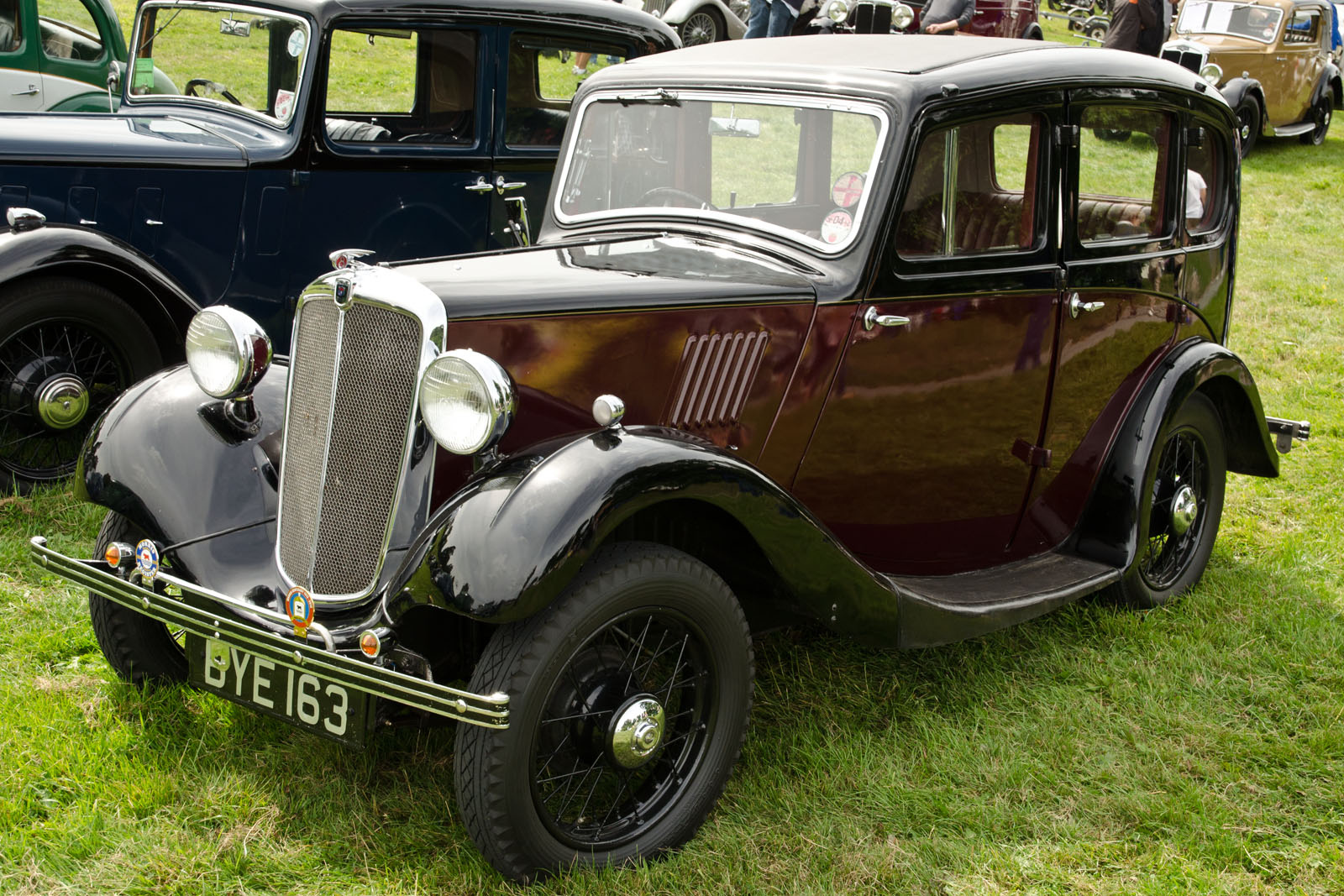
- 4-door saloon first registered June 1935

Overview
- Also called: Morris 8/40 (Australia)
- Production: 1934–1937; 164,102 produced

Body and chassis
- Body style: 2/4-door saloon; 2-seater convertible; Tourer (4-seater) convertible; 2-door 5 cwt van

Powertrain
- Engine: 918 cc Morris Type UB Sidevalve I4
- Transmission: 3-speed manual

Dimensions
- Wheelbase: 90 in (2,286 mm); 81 in (2,057 mm) (swb tourer)
- Width: 54.5 in (1,384 mm)
- Height: 60 in (1,524 mm)

The car was powered by a Morris UB series 918 cc four-cylinder side-valve engine with three-bearing crankshaft and single SU carburettor with maximum power of 23.5 bhp (17.5 kW). The gearbox was a three-speed unit with synchromesh on the top two speeds and Lockheed hydraulic brakes were fitted. Coil ignition was used in a Lucas electrical system powered by a 6-volt battery and third brush dynamo.

The body, which was either a saloon or open tourer, was mounted on a separate channel section chassis with a 7 feet 6 inches (2.29 m) wheelbase. The tourer could reach 58 mph (93 km/h) and return 45 miles per imperial gallon (6.3 L/100 km; 37 mpg_{‑US}); the saloons were a little slower. The chrome-plated radiator shell and honeycomb grille were dummies disguising the real one hidden behind. In September 1934 the bare chassis was offered for £95. For buyers of complete cars prices ranged from £118 for the basic two-seater to £142 for the four door saloon with "sunshine" roof and leather seats. Bumpers and indicators were £2 10 shillings (£2.50) extra.

Compared with the similarly priced, but much lighter and longer established Austin 7, the 1934/35 Morris Eight was well equipped. The driver was provided with a full set of instruments including a speedometer with a built in odometer, oil pressure and fuel level gauges and an ammeter. The more modern design of the Morris was reflected in the superior performance of its hydraulically operated 8-inch drum brakes. The Morris also scored over its Ford rival by incorporating an electric windscreen wiper rather than the more old-fashioned vacuum powered equivalent, while its relatively wide 45 inch track aided directional stability on corners.

The Series I designation was used from June 1935 in line with other Morris models, cars made before this are known as pre-series although the official Morris Motors designation was by the model year (35) even though they were introduced in October 1934. Of the 164,102 cars produced approximately 24,000 were tourers.

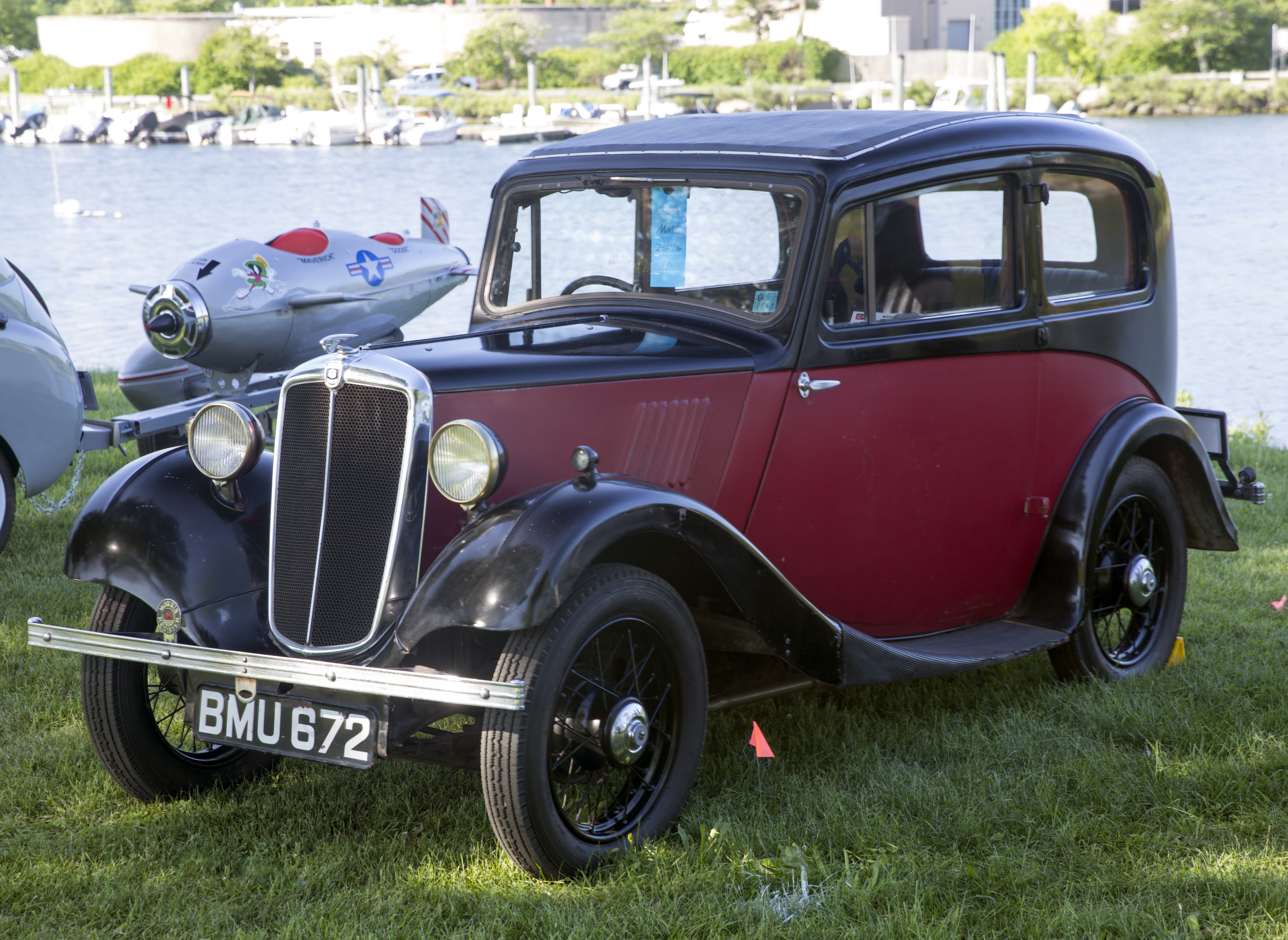
Two-door Saloon

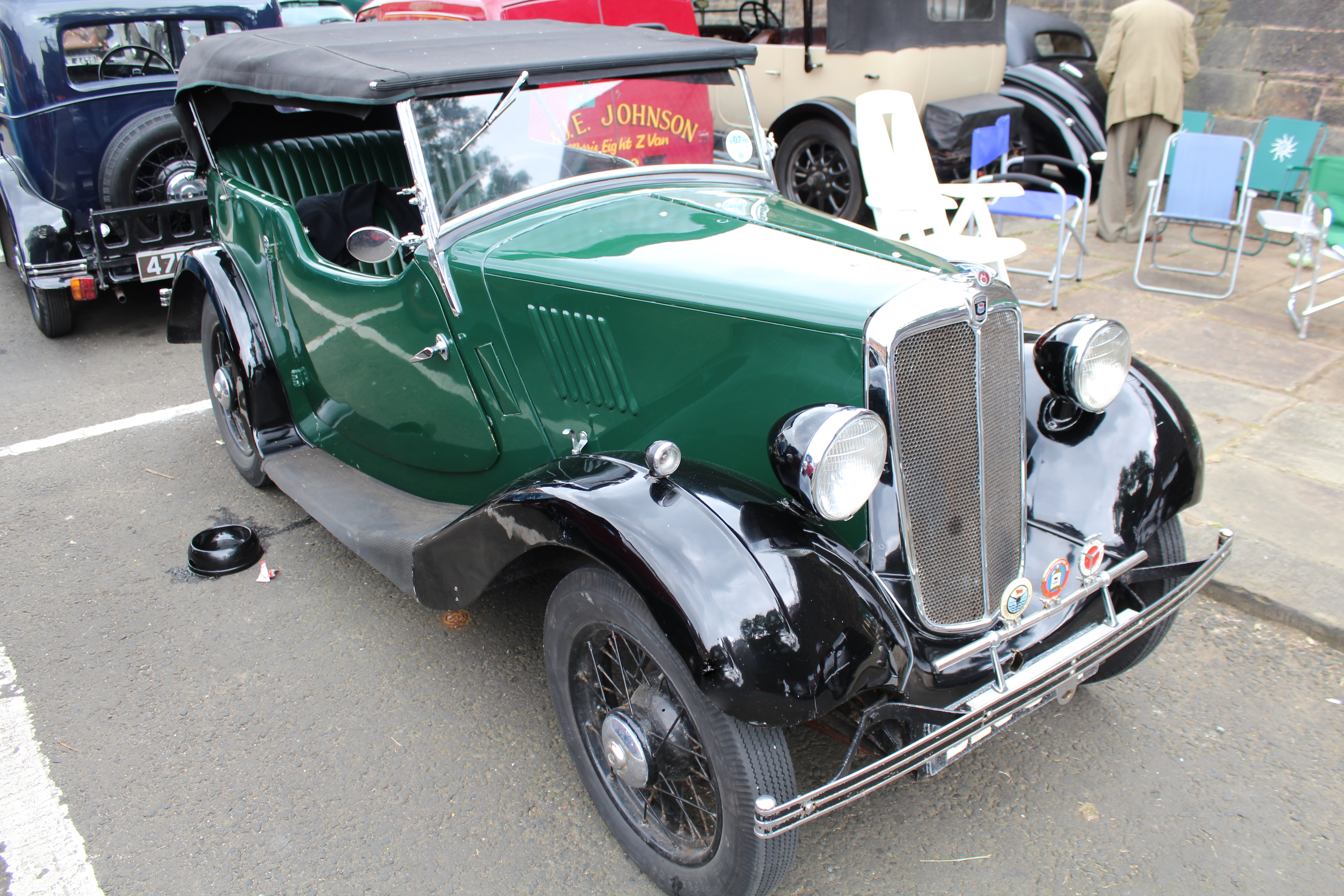
4-seater tourer

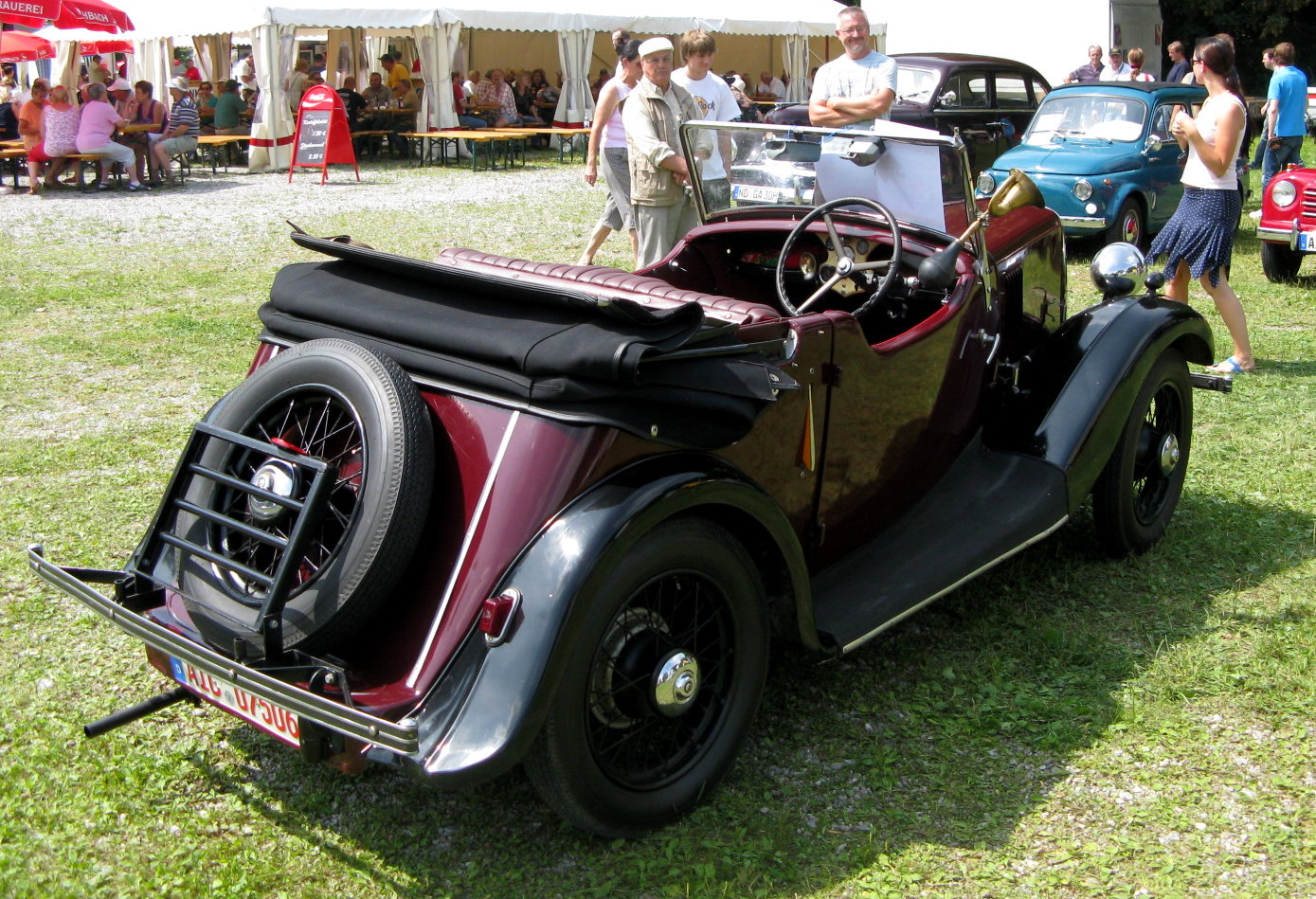
open 2-seater sports-tourer

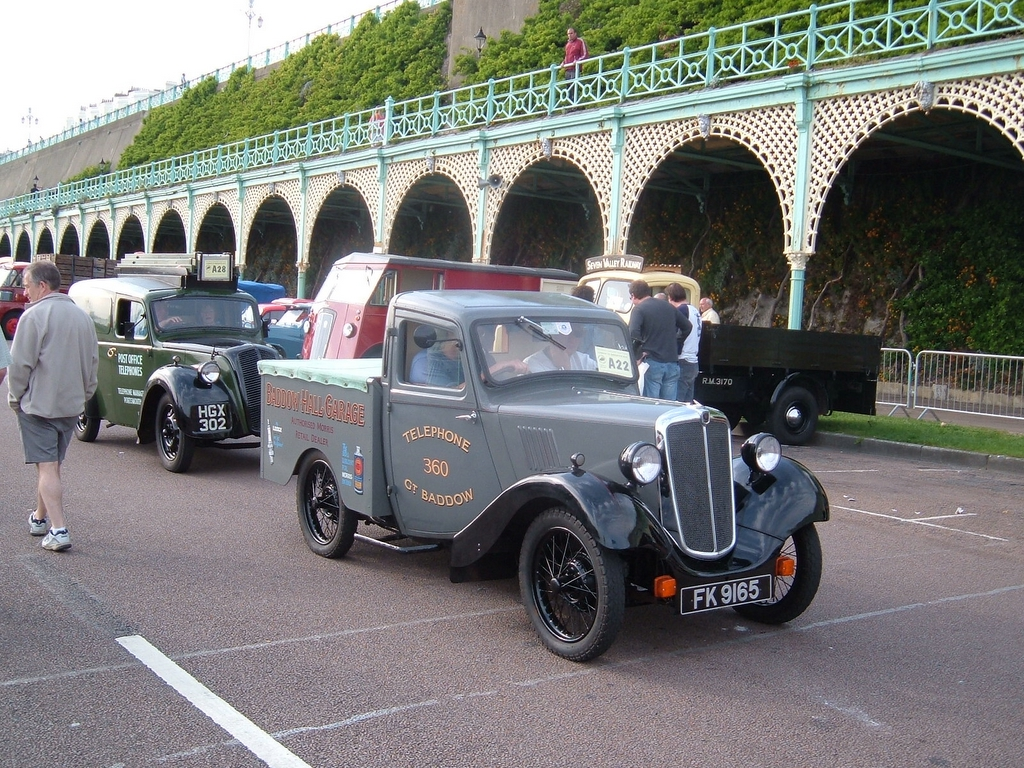
5-cwt pickup, converted from a Van

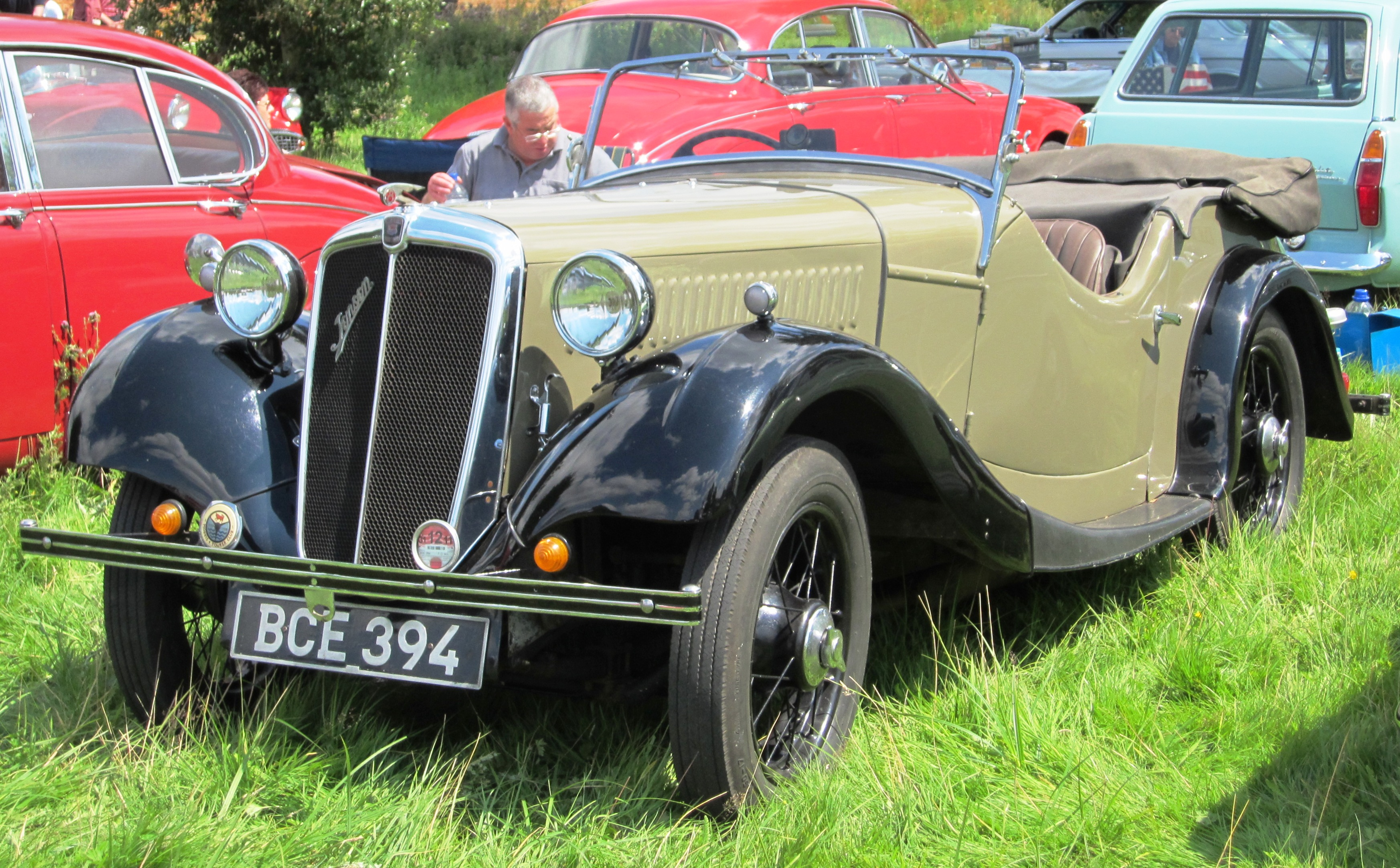
body by Jensen

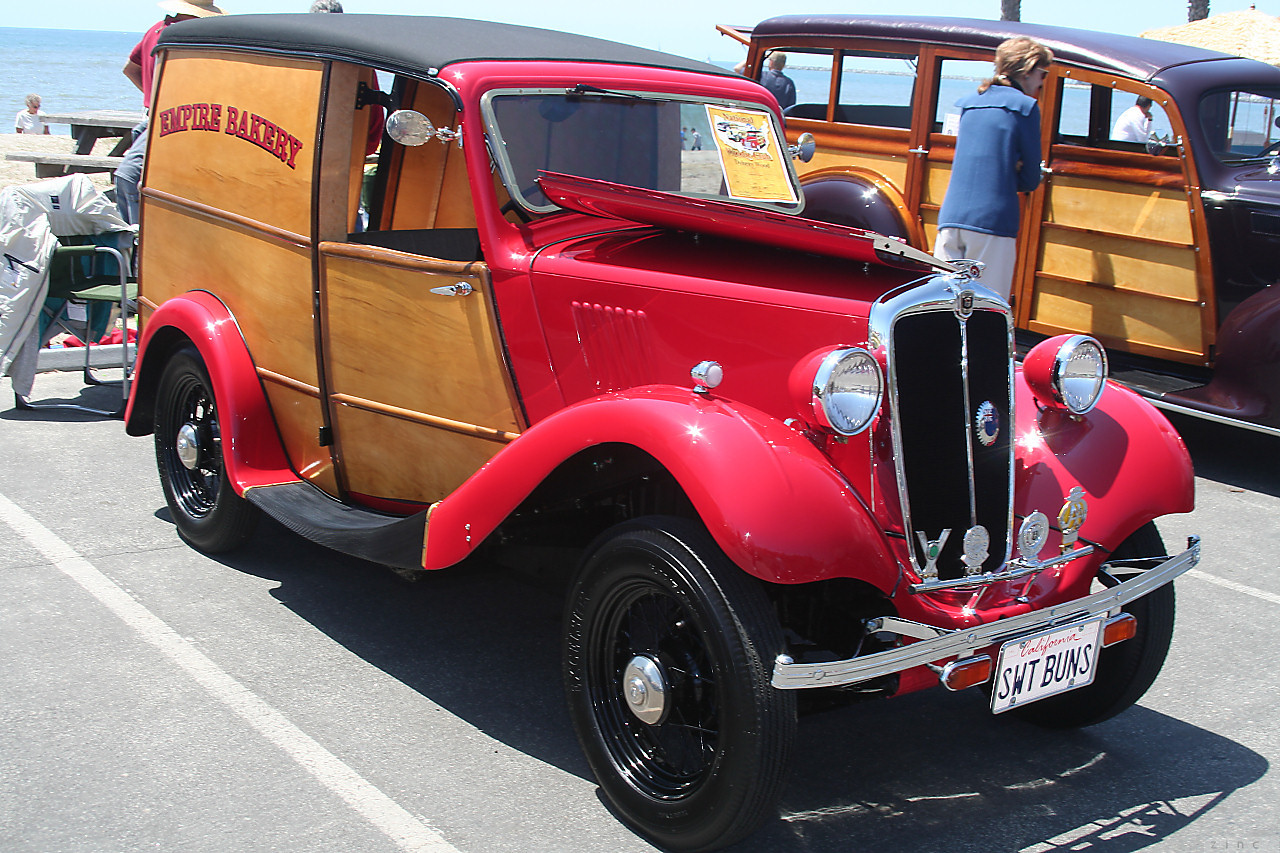
Morris 8 Van with wooden body

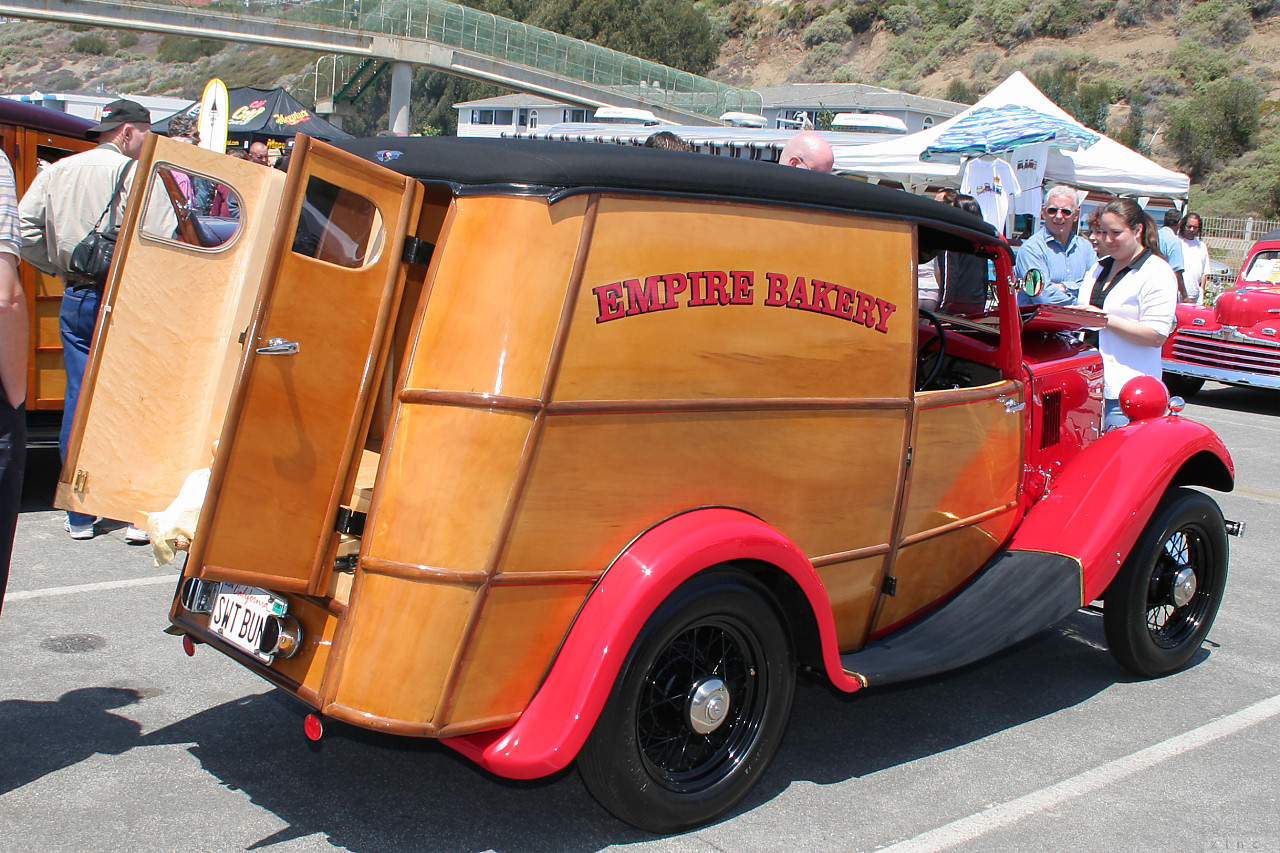
Wooden van; rear view

== Morris Eight Series II ==
Morris Eight Series II
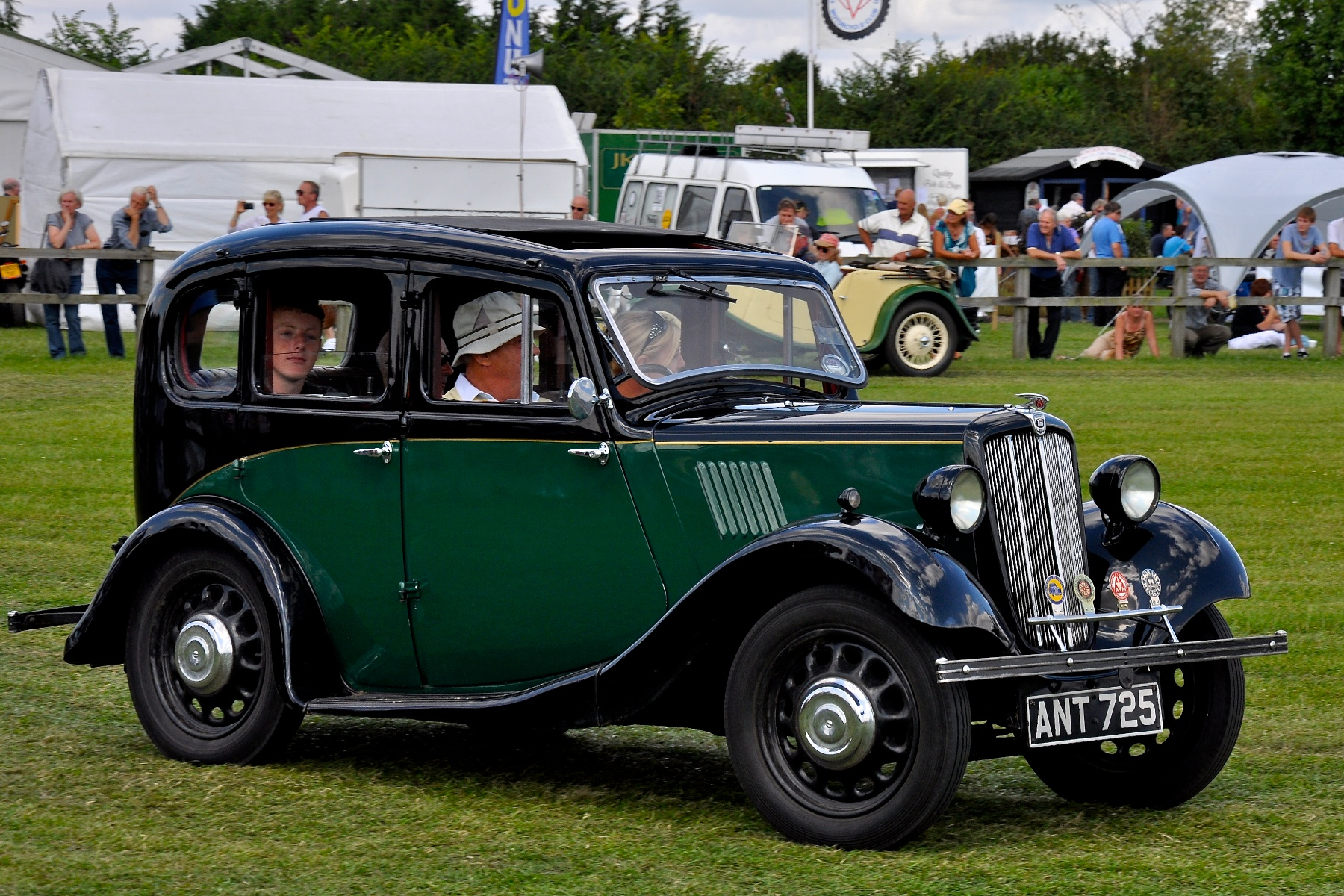
- 4-door saloon

Overview
- Also called: Morris 8/40 (Australia)
- Production: 1938; 54,000 produced

Body and chassis
- Body style: 2-door saloon 4-door saloon 2-seater convertible Tourer (4-seater) convertible 2-door coupe utility (Australia); 2-door roadster utility (Australia)

Powertrain
- Engine: 918 cc Type UB side-valve I4

Dimensions
- Wheelbase: 90 in (2,286 mm)

In 1938 the car was updated with a slight restyle to match the other cars in the Morris range. Changes included painted rather than plated radiator surrounds and disc (Easiclean) wheels replaced the previous "Magna" wire spoked ones. The engine and running gear were unchanged. For Australian buyers only, there was also a utility, produced by Ruskin Bodyworks in Victoria from CKD kits supplied by Morris. It was available as a coupé utility and as a roadster utility. Australian models were marketed as the Morris 8/40.

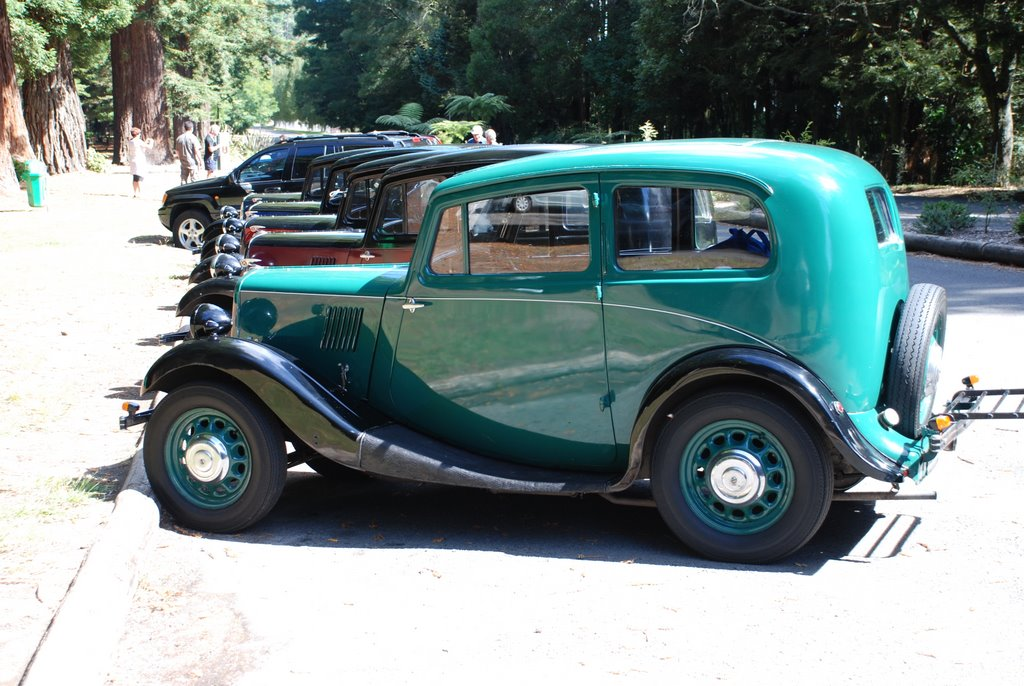
2-door saloon and siblings in New Zealand

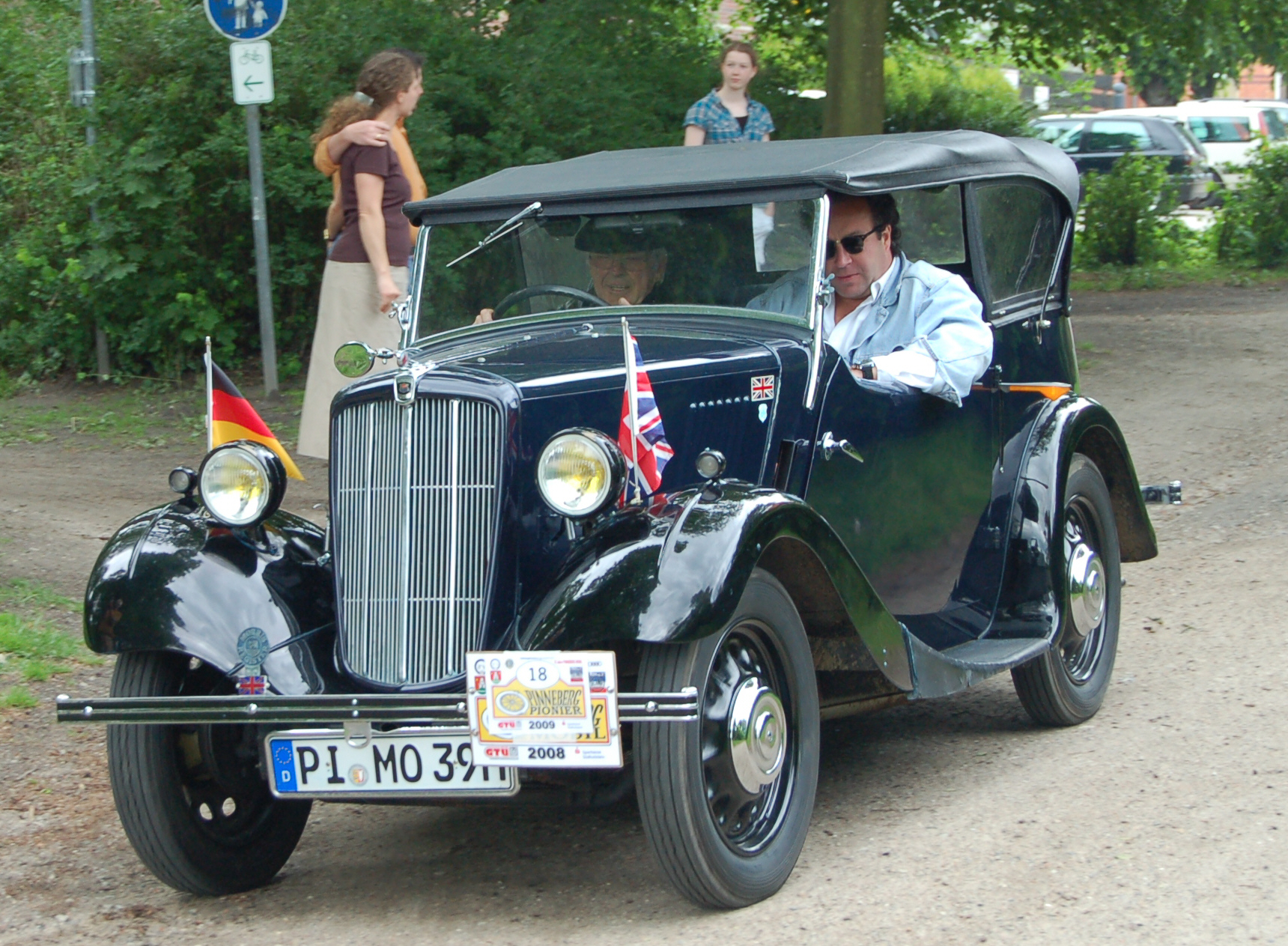
tourer signalling a left turn

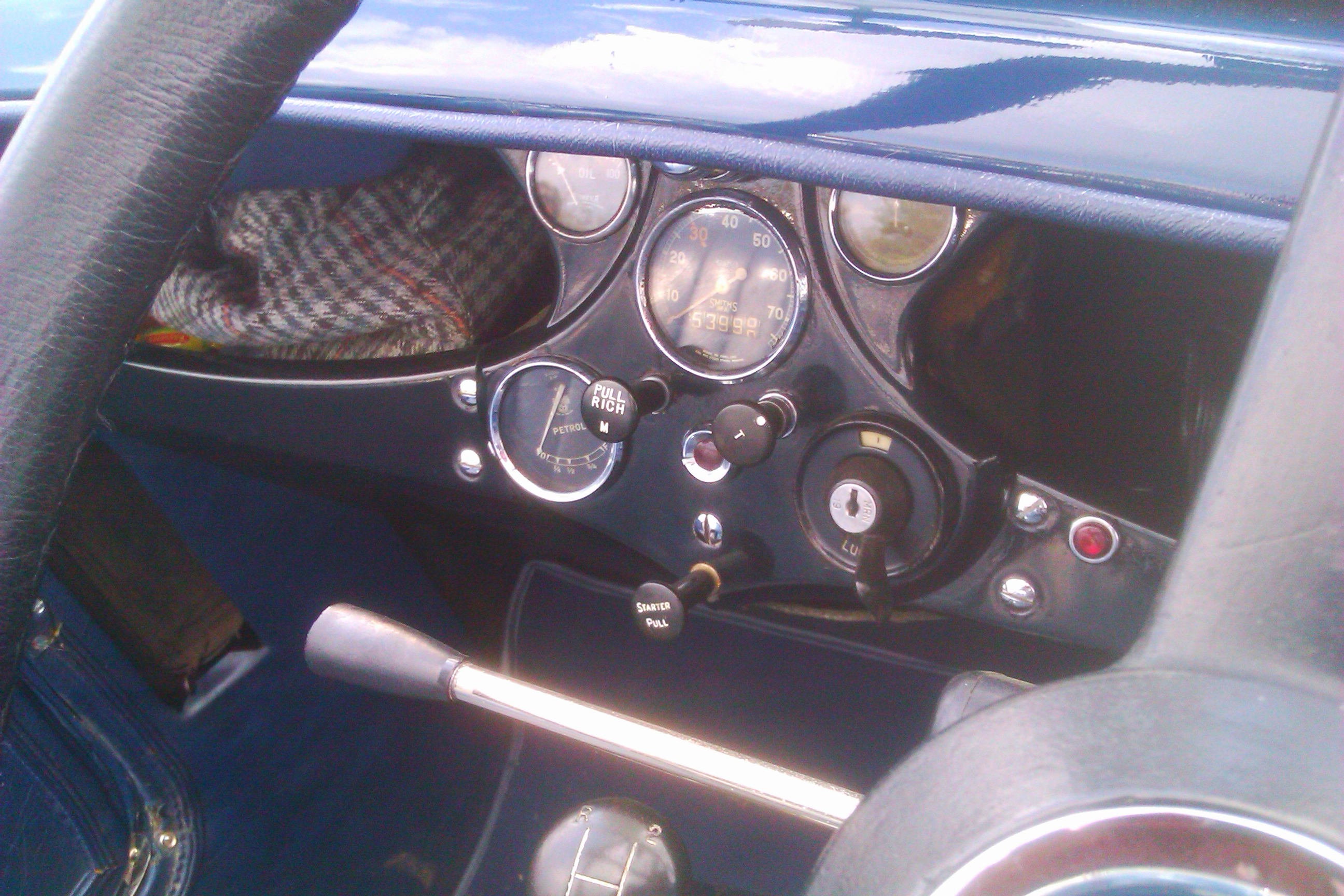
tourer fascia 1937

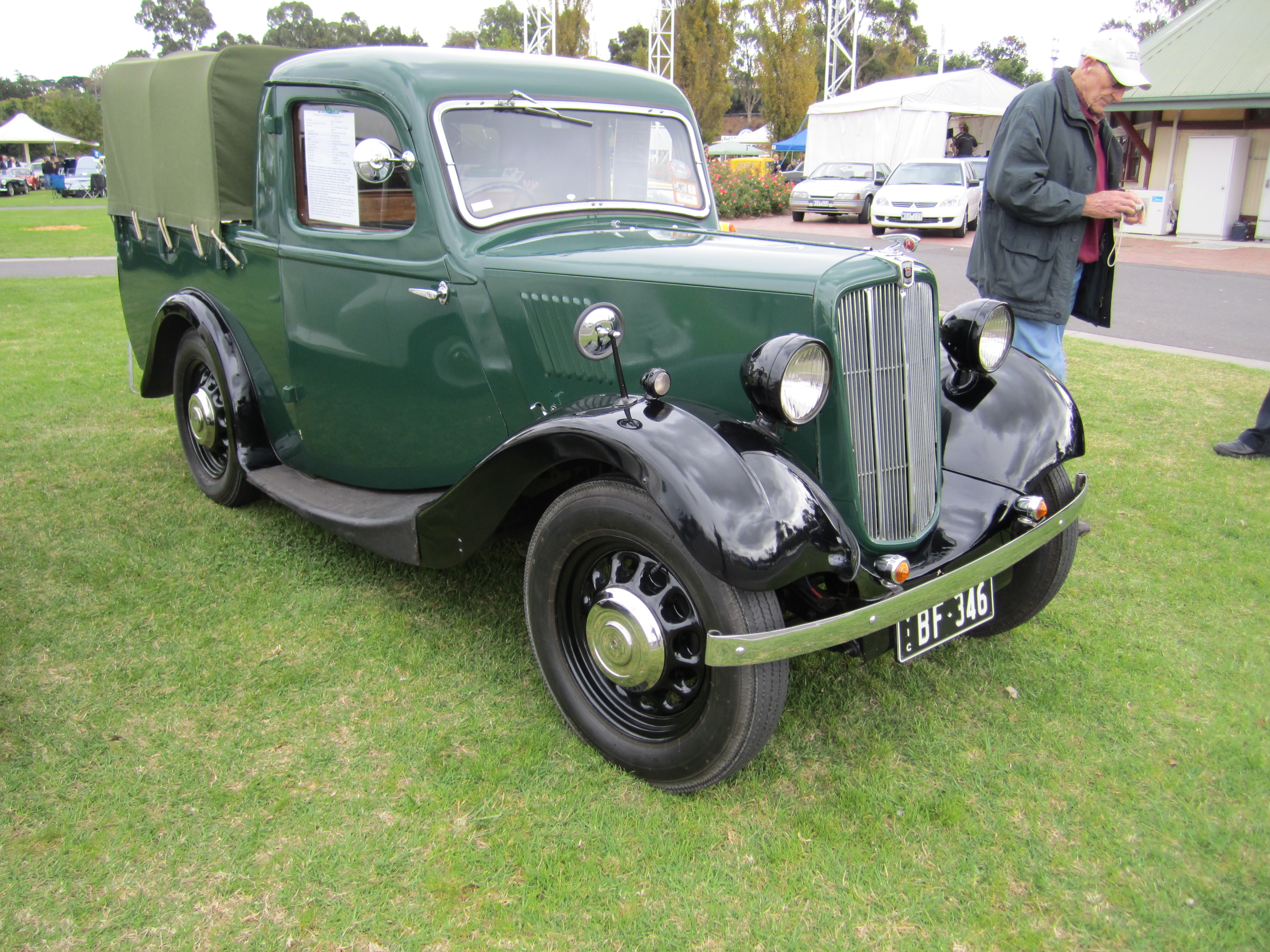
8/40 coupé utility (Australia)

== Morris Eight Series E ==
Morris Eight Series E
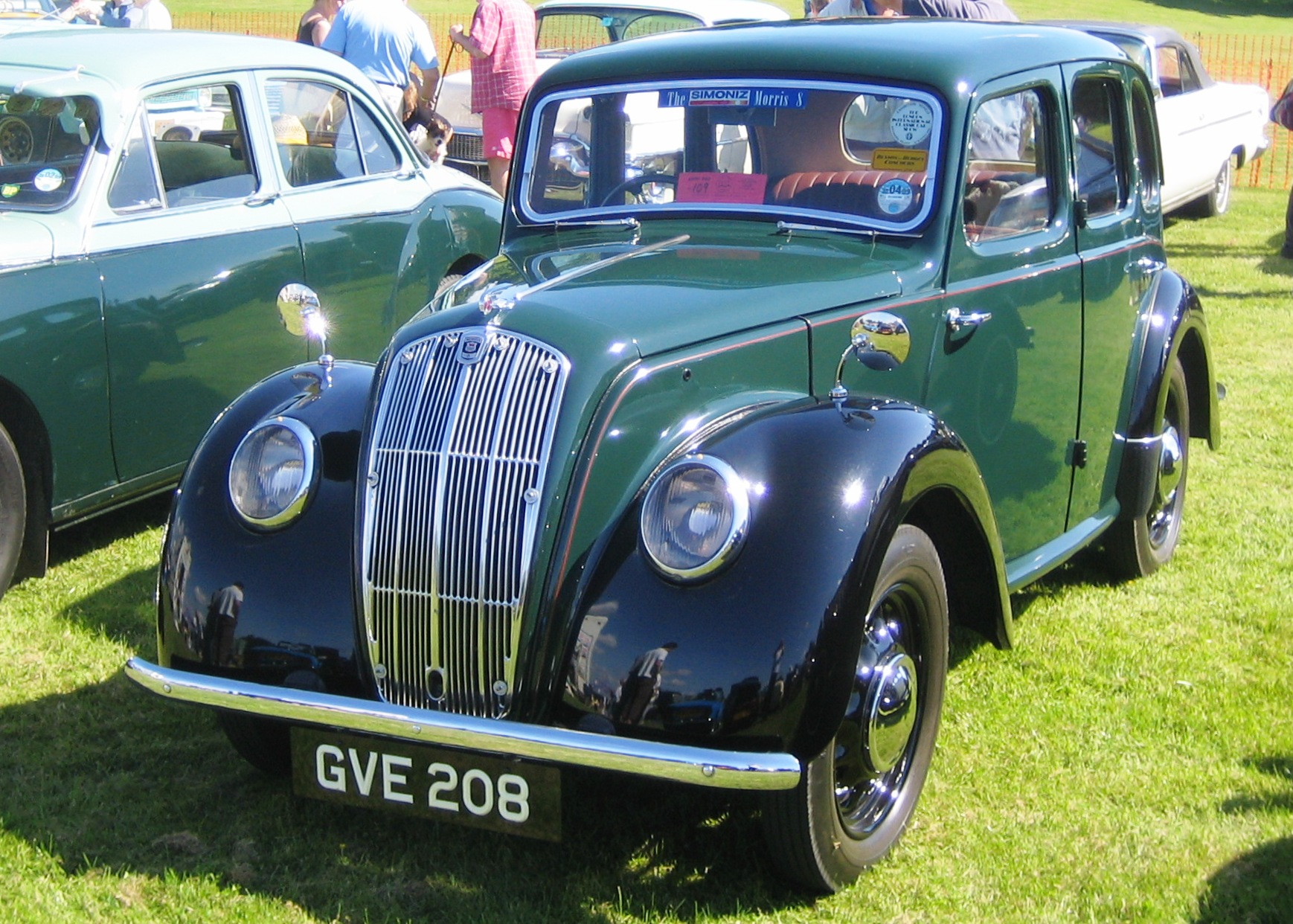
- Series E 4-door saloon

Overview
- Also called: Morris 8/40 (Australia)
- Production: 1938–1948; 120,434 produced

Body and chassis
- Body style: 2-door saloon, fixed or sliding head 4-door saloon, fixed or sliding head 2-seater convertible Tourer (4-seater) convertible 2-door roadster utility 2-door coupe utility 2-door panel van

Powertrain
- Engine: 918 cc Morris Type USHM Sidevalve engine Straight-4

Dimensions
- Wheelbase: 89 in (2261 mm)
- Length: 144 in (3658 mm)

The Series E announced in October 1938 brought a major restyle with a "waterfall" dummy grille, headlights in the wings and the running boards had gone. The car was longer, wider and heavier but the wheelbase was actually 1-inch (25 mm) shorter at 7 feet 5 inches (2.26 m). There was now an "inbuilt luggage compartment with external access" with a space available of 'close on 5¼ cubic feet with the door closed'. There was also a parcels tray the full width of the dashboard. The "alligator" bonnet was now rear hinged making engine access poor.

A vertical-lensed headlight conversion was available from Lucas, to give better lighting.

=== USHM engine ===
The engine was upgraded to the Morris USHM series, getting a new cylinder head, still side-valve however, the unit being very similar to those used in Series I and II cars. Increased power to 29 bhp (22 kW) was now available and the crankshaft was counterbalanced and fitted with shell-type bearings. The gearbox was now four-speed with synchromesh on second, third and top. The Lucas electrics remained at 6 volts, but now with automatic regulation of the dynamo in a two-brush system. Top speed was around 58 mph (93 km/h).

The engine went on to be used, with very minor changes, in the series MM from 1948 till 1953 Morris Minor and was also adapted as an auxiliary power unit in Centurion, Conqueror and Chieftain tanks. Morris also used this engine as the basis of special Marine and Stationary power plants.

=== Production ===
Production continued through the war for the military, essential civilian use and some export. Post-war general production restarted in 1945 but there were no more tourers made in the UK. In Australia, however, a flourishing bodybuilding industry continued to provide tourer versions on imported chassis/mechanicals.

A very similarly styled Wolseley Eight was also prepared in the 1930s and offered after 1945. An original 1939 prototype survives, having for many years been owned by Lord Nuffield.

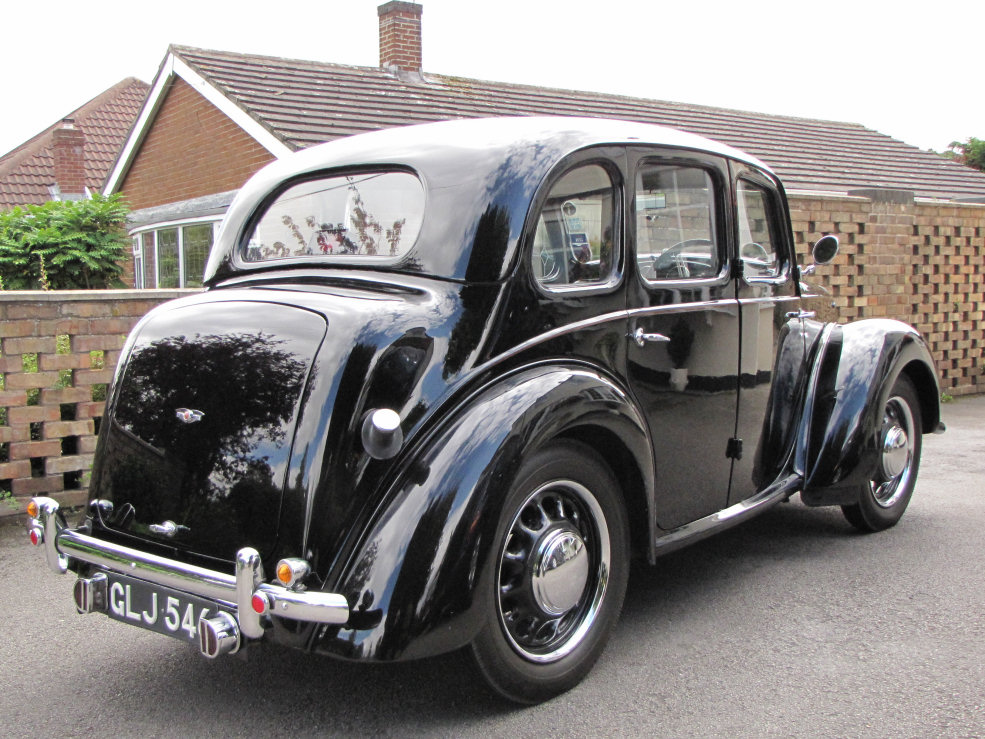
4-door saloon 1946

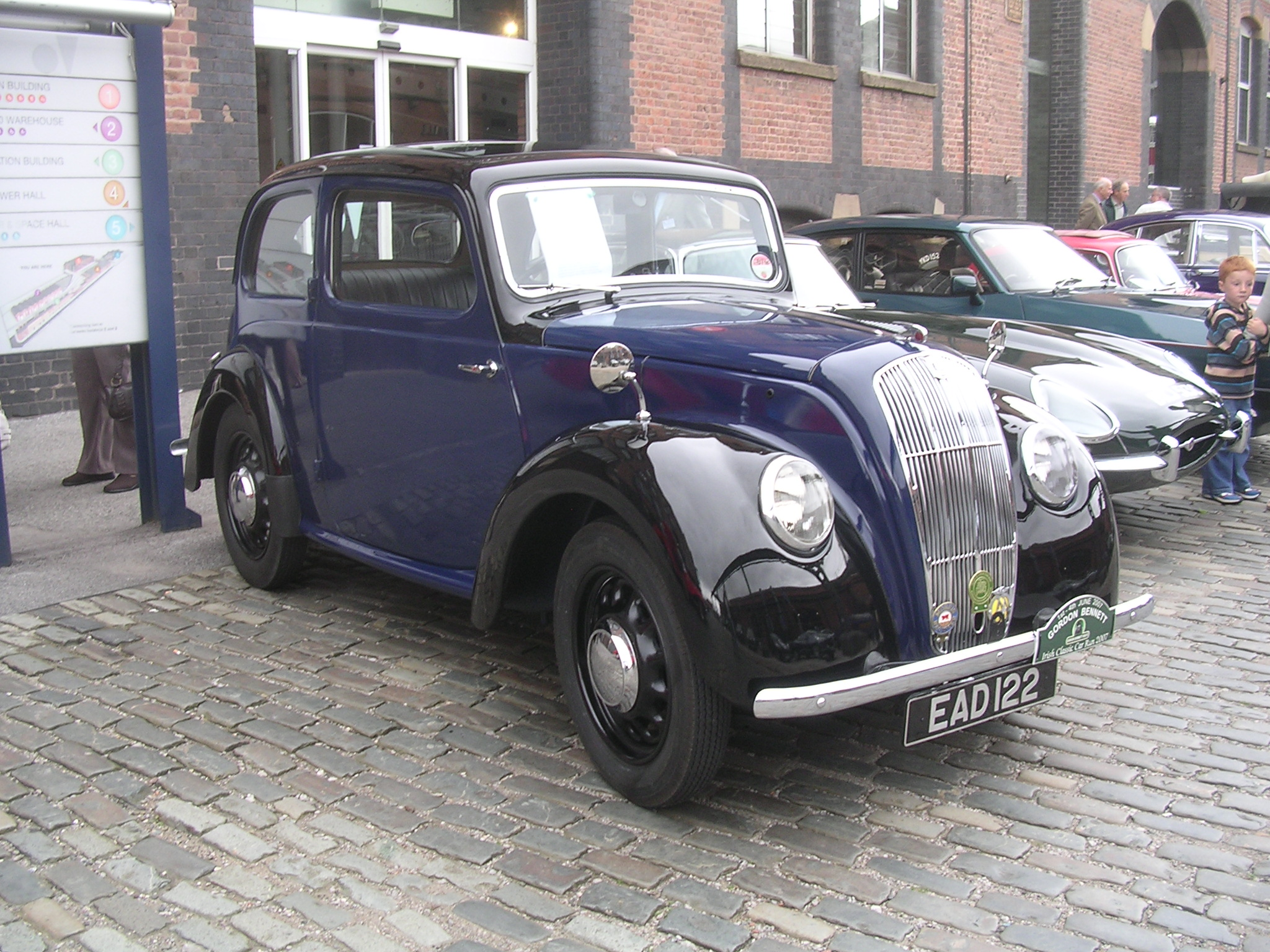
2-door saloon 1939

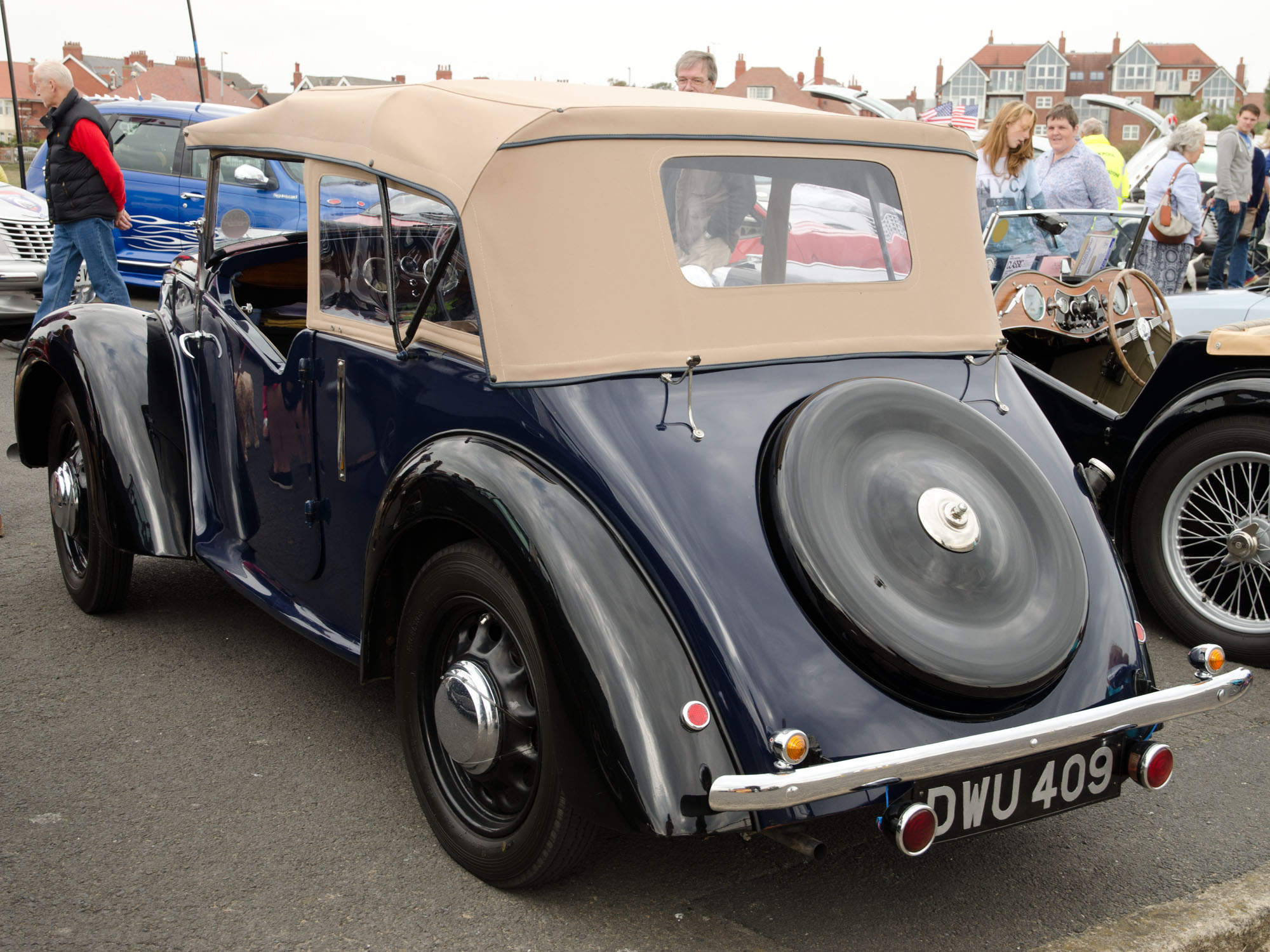
Tourer 1939

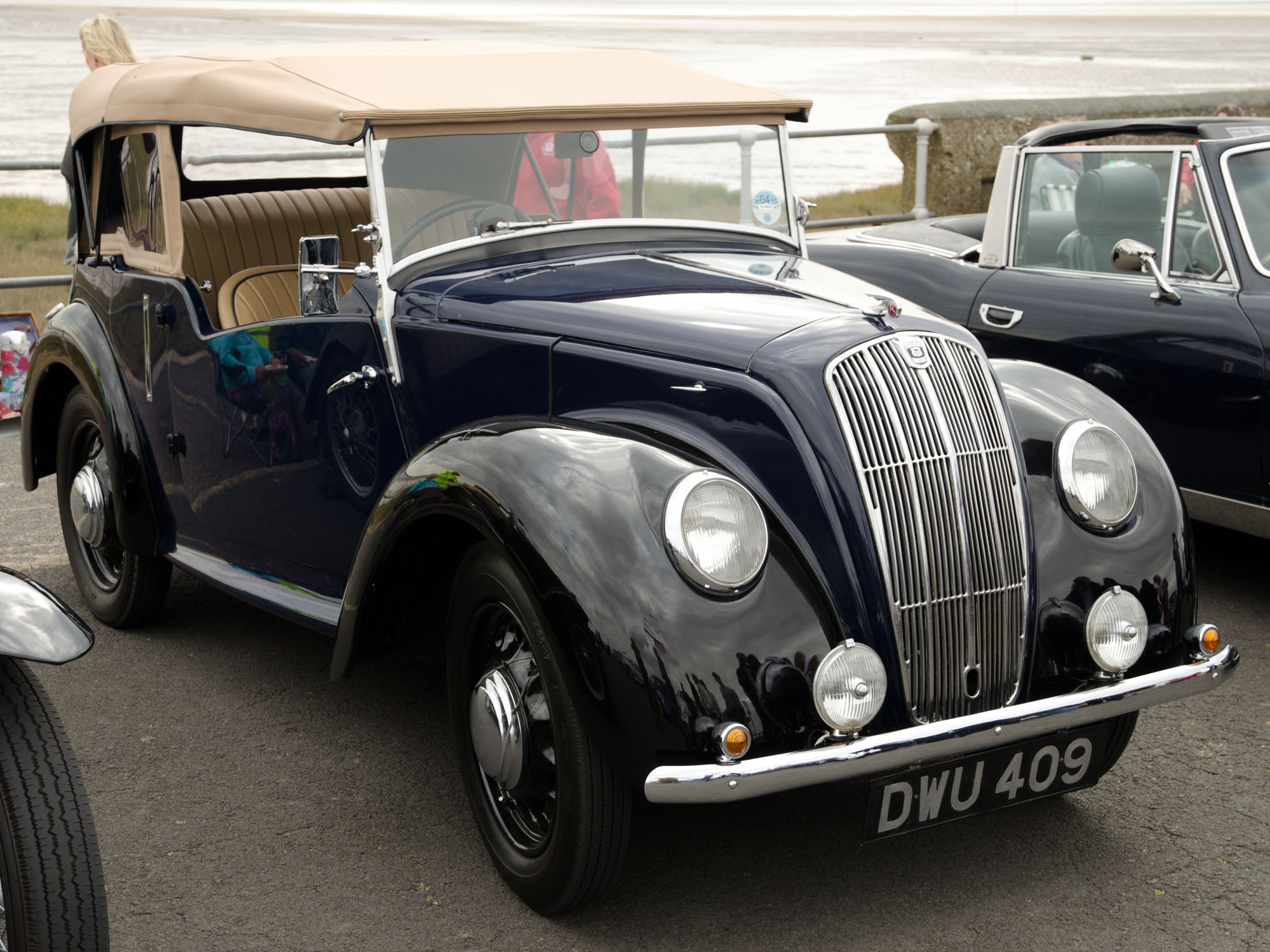
Tourer 1939

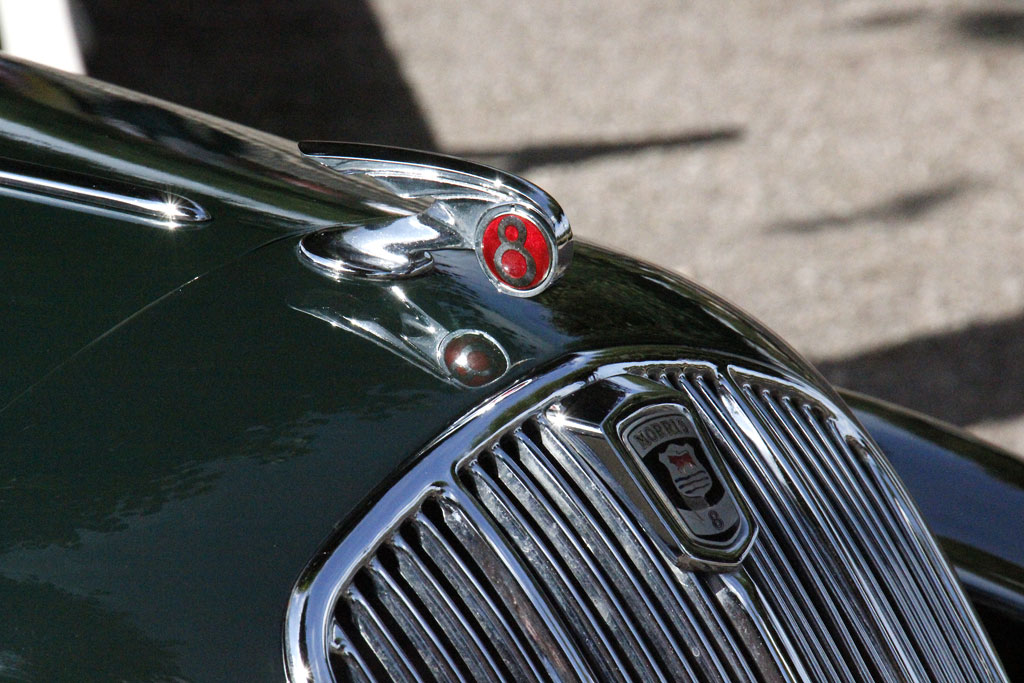
Badge on 1939 Morris 8 Tourer

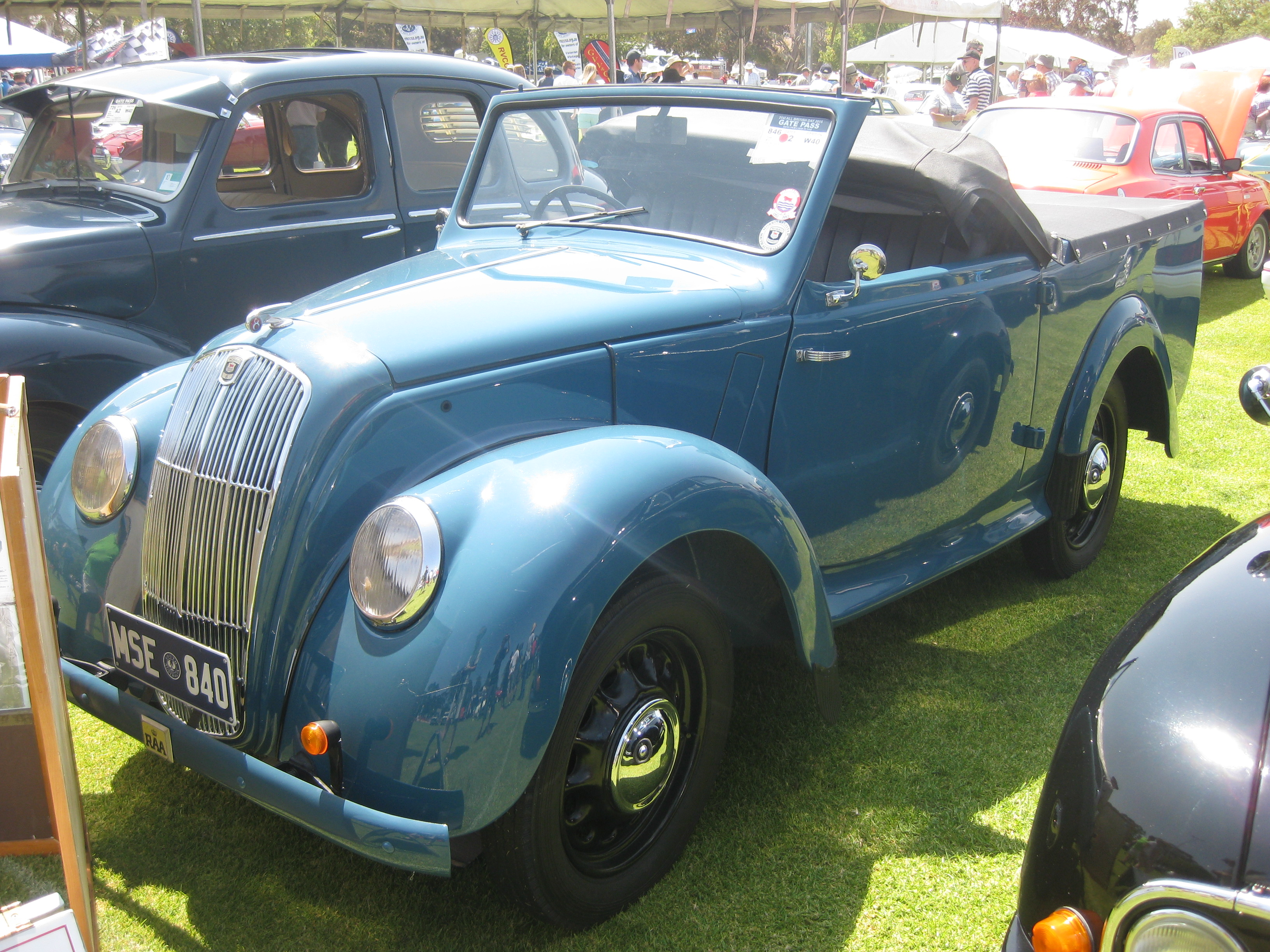
1946 Morris 8/40 Series E Roadster Utility

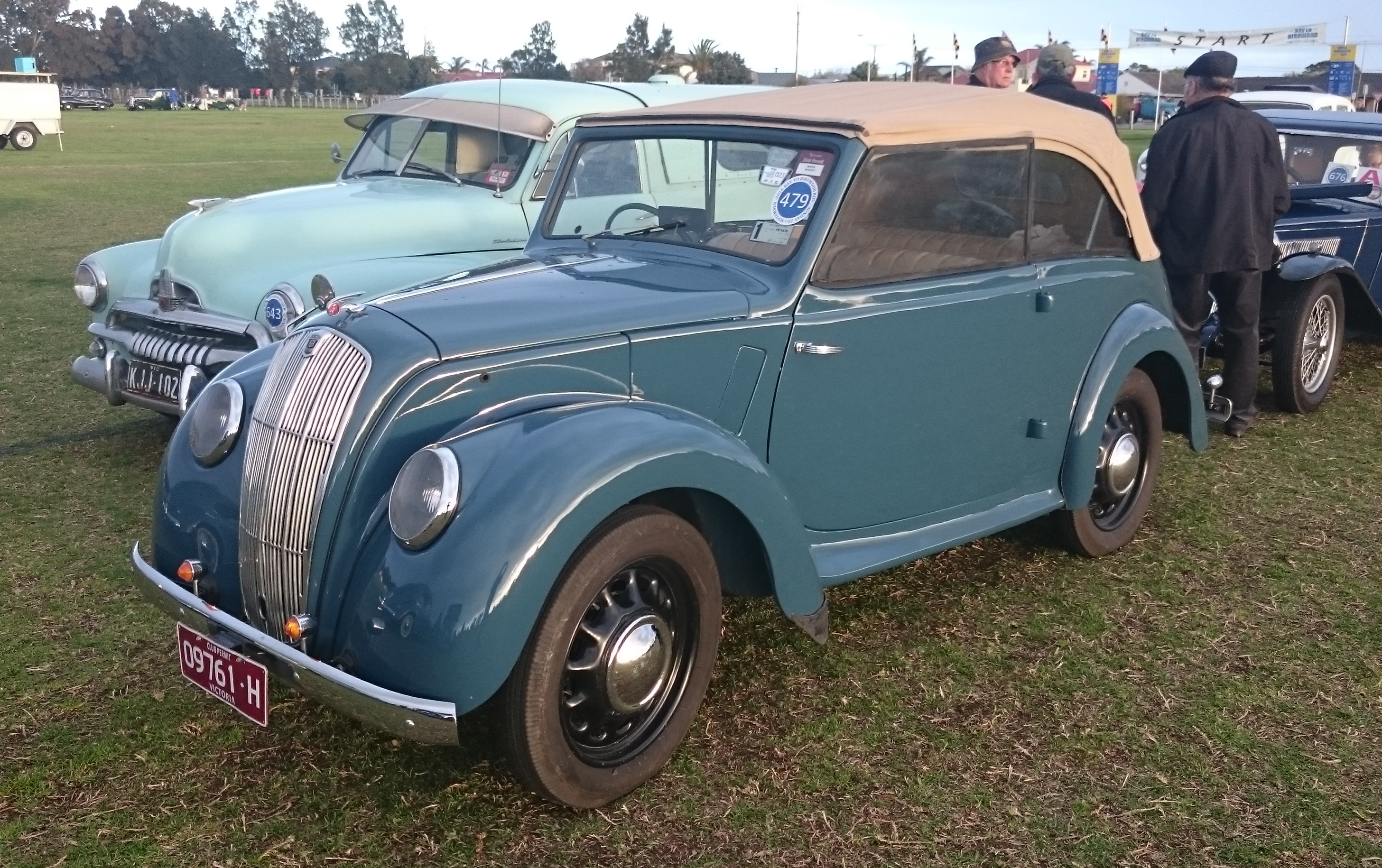
Australian-built 1948 Morris 8/40 Tourer (Series E)

== Morris Series Z ==
Morris Series Z
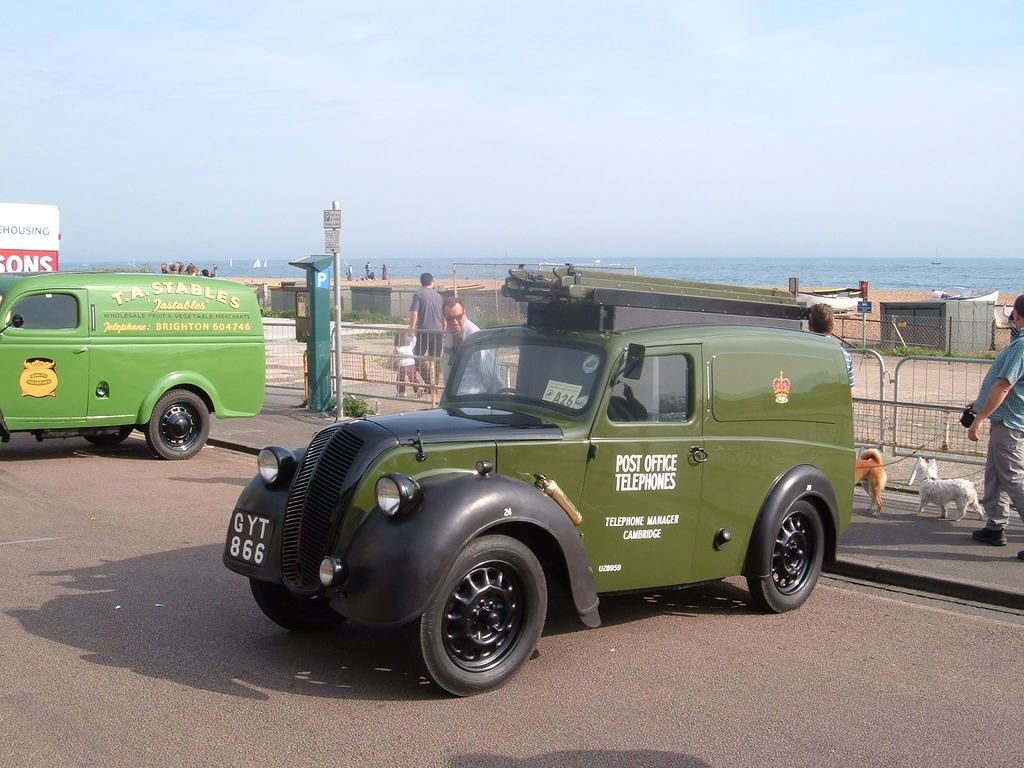
- Morris Series Z Van

Overview
- Production: 1940–1954; Over 51,000 produced
- Assembly: United Kingdom; Australia

Body and chassis
- Body style: 2-door van 2-door coupé utility (Australia)

A van version of the Series E, rated at 5 cwt capacity and designated as the Series Z, was produced from 1940 to 1953. While having the external appearance similar to the Series E, mechanically the vans were more akin to the Series II, still having a three-speed gearbox. More than 51,000 examples were built.

A coupé utility variant of the Series Z was produced in Australia, utilising imported chassis and engines with locally built bodies.

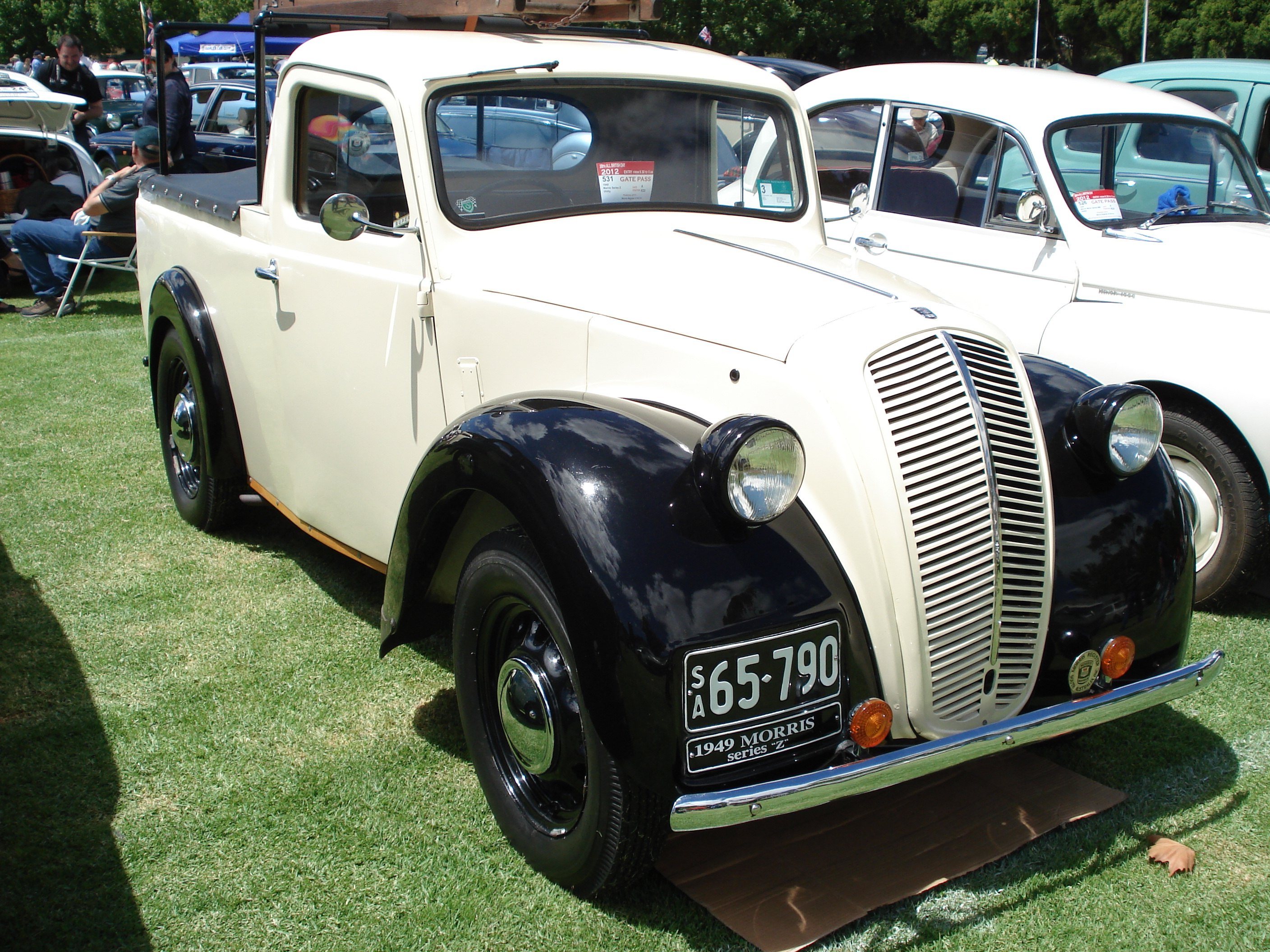
1949 Morris Series Z 5 cwt coupé utility
