= Ford Model Y =

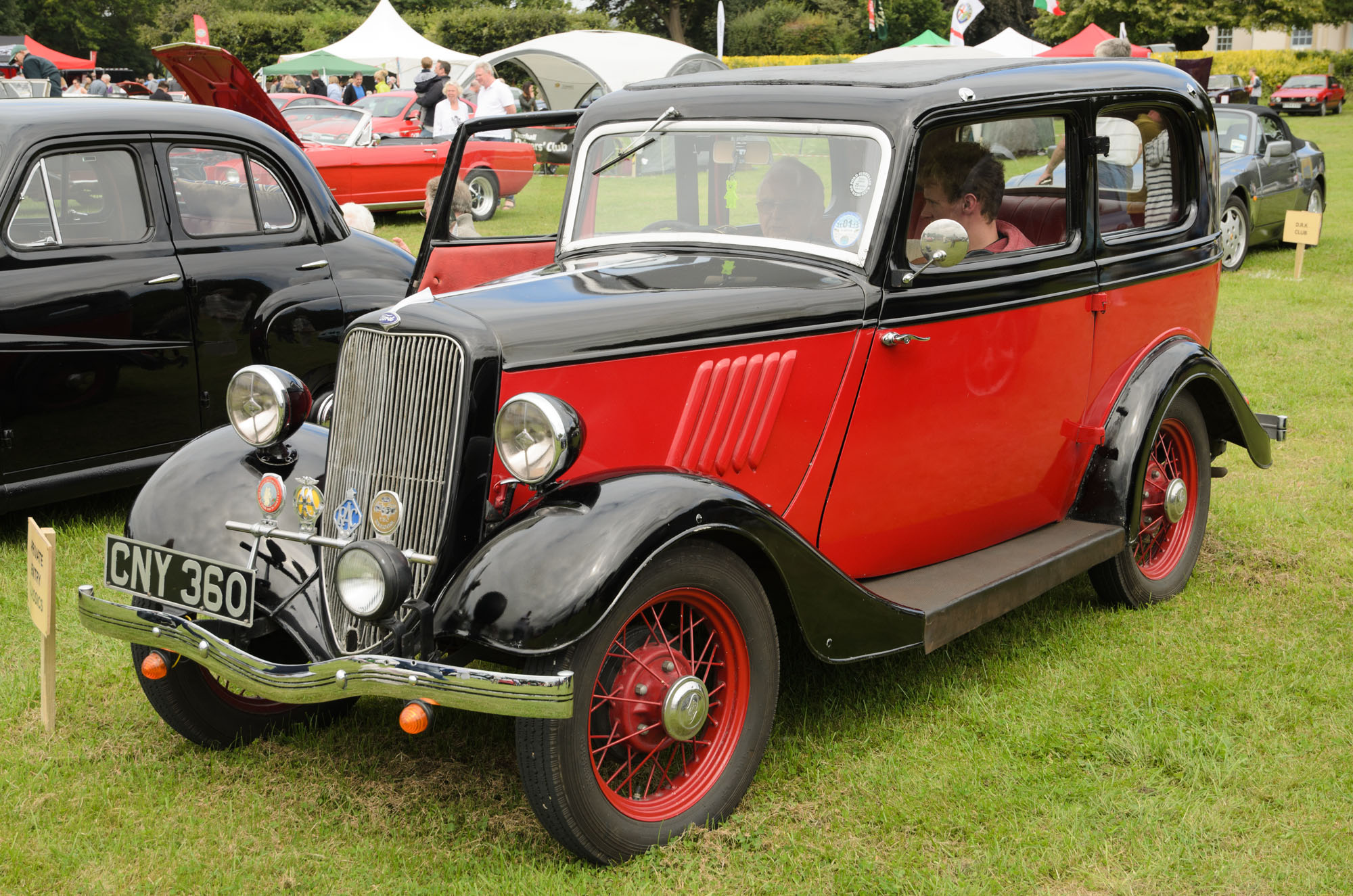

Overview
- Manufacturer: Ford of Britain; Ford SAF; Ford Germany; Ford España
- Production: 1932–1937

Body and chassis
- Body style: 2-door saloon 4-door saloon 2-door estate 2-door van 2-door pickup

Powertrain
- Engine: 0.9 L Ford Sidevalve engine

Dimensions
- Wheelbase: 90 in (2,286 mm)
- Length: 141 in (3,581 mm)
- Width: 55 in (1,397 mm)
- Height: 64 in (1,626 mm)
- Curb weight: 1,540 lb (700 kg)

Chronology
- Predecessor: Ford Model A
- Successor: Ford 7Y; Ford Model C Ten

The Ford Model Y is an automobile that was produced by Ford Britain, Ford SAF and Ford Germany from 1932 to 1937. It was the first Ford automobile specifically designed for markets outside the United States, replacing the Model A in Europe.

== Production locations ==
It was in production in England, where it is sometimes remembered as the "Ford Eight", reflecting its fiscal horsepower rating, from 1932 until September 1937,

The car was also produced in France (where it was known as the Ford 6 CV, despite actually falling within the 5CV French car tax band) from 1932 to 1934, and in Germany as the Ford Köln from 1933 to 1936.

Smaller numbers were assembled in Australia (where a coupé version was also produced), Ireland (branded as the Baby Ford), Japan, Latvia (branded as the Ford Junior) and in Spain nicknamed as the Ford Forito. Plans to build it in the U.S. were scrubbed when a cost accounting showed that it would only be slightly cheaper to build than the Ford Model B.

== The car ==
The car was powered by a 933 cc (56.9 cu in) 8 (RAC)hp Ford sidevalve engine. The little Ford was available in two- and four-door versions, sold as the 'Tudor' (a pun on 'two-door') and the 'Fordor' (Ford/four-door) respectively. Originally each body was also available in standard or better-equipped 'DeLuxe' trim levels, but with the introduction of the 10hp Model C in late 1934, also available in DeLuxe form, these better-equipped versions of the Model Y were dropped from sale. The Model Y was now built to a single specification that was essentially the same as the previous standard guise but with a small number of features carried over from the old DeLuxe and the model was named the Popular for marketing purposes. This standardisation allowed production of the Model Y to be increased while the production cost per car was decreased. Over the next 12 months improvements in the production process at Dagenham, further alterations to the specification and some minor components and the increasing sales of the Model C (which brought economies of scale for the parts shared with the Model Y/Popular) allowed the sale price of the car to be dropped further. In June 1935 Ford was able to announce that the Popular Tudor model would be sold for just £100, a price it would hold until July 1937. This was the first time a four-seater closed-bodied saloon car had sold in Britain for that price (the first British car to sell for £100, the 1931 Morris Minor SV, was a two-seater with a collapsible fabric roof and a wood-framed body).

The suspension was traditional Ford transverse leaf springs front and rear and the engine drove the rear wheels through a three-speed gearbox which, right from the start, featured synchromesh between the top two ratios. The maximum speed was just under 60 mph (95 km/h) and fuel consumption was 32 miles per imperial gallon (8.8 L/100 km; 27 mpg_{‑US}).

Even by the standards of the time, the UK-built Ford 8, like its major competitor the Austin 7, was found noteworthy for its "almost unbelievable lack of brakes."

The Model Y also inspired copying by Morris Motors, with the Eight, and by Singer Motors, with the Bantam.

== Evolution ==
For the first 14 months the original model with a short radiator grille was produced, this is known as the "short rad". After this in October 1933 the "long rad" model, with its longer radiator grille and front bumper with the characteristic dip was produced. By gradually improving production efficiency and by simplifying the body design the cost of a "Popular" Model Y was reduced to £100, making it the cheapest true 4-seater saloon ever, although most customers were persuaded to pay extra for a less austere version. Both 4-door (Fordor) and 2-door (Tudor) saloons were produced and these could be had either with a fixed roof, or the slightly more expensive sliding "sun" roof.

== Additional body version ==
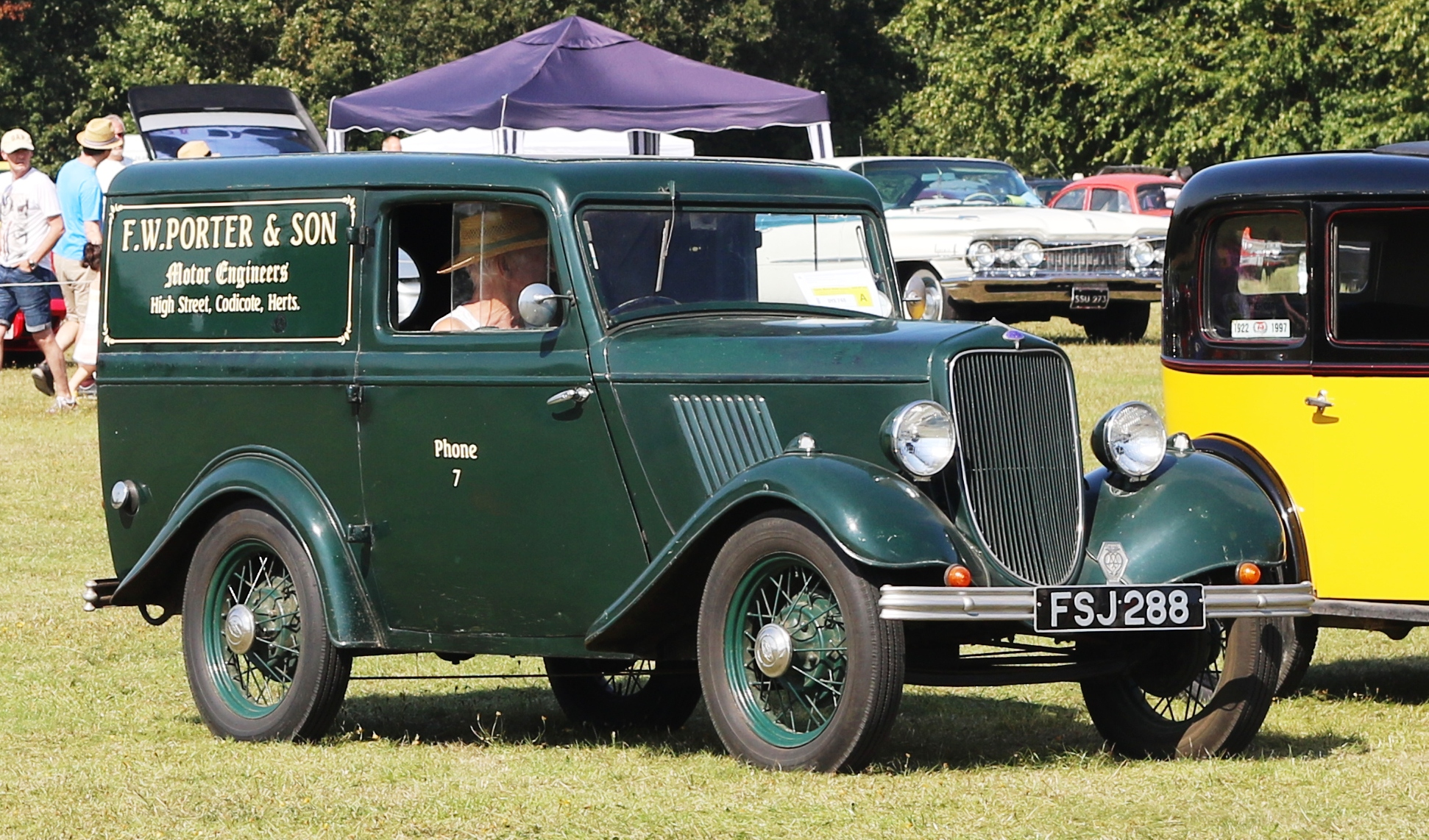
A light van version was also offered

Also offered was an attractive 5 cwt van, which proved very popular with small businesses.

Ford did not produce an open-top car because it was thought that the chassis was too flexible, but several specialist coach builders produced a range of Model Y tourers.

== Commercial ==
=== Market reaction in Britain ===
Although of American design, the Model Y took the British market by storm, and when it was first introduced it made a major dent in the sales figures of Austin, Morris, Singer, and Hillman. It went on to take more than 50 per cent of the 8(RAC)HP sales.

=== Volumes ===
Some 175,000 Model Ys were produced worldwide (including 153,117 in Great Britain and 11,121 in Germany) and the 'Y' and 'C' Register contains approximately 1,250 survivors.

== Ford Model C ==
In Britain the larger and faster 10(RAC)hp Model C never sold in such great numbers as the Model Y although there was a very attractive factory-produced tourer. In 1935 the styling was enhanced with some small modifications and the model was designated the CX.

In Germany the position was reversed. The locally produced Ford Model C was branded as the Ford Eifel, and remained in production for four years after the manufacturer had given up on the locally produced Type Y, the Ford Köln. The Köln was outcompeted by the Opel 1.0/1.2 litre, and only 11,121 Kölns were produced, while a more respectable 62,495 Eifels were manufactured between 1935 and 1940. There was never an 8hp Vauxhall equivalent to the Opel offering.

== See also ==
- Eugene Turenne Gregorie
