= Ford Model C Ten =

Ford Model C
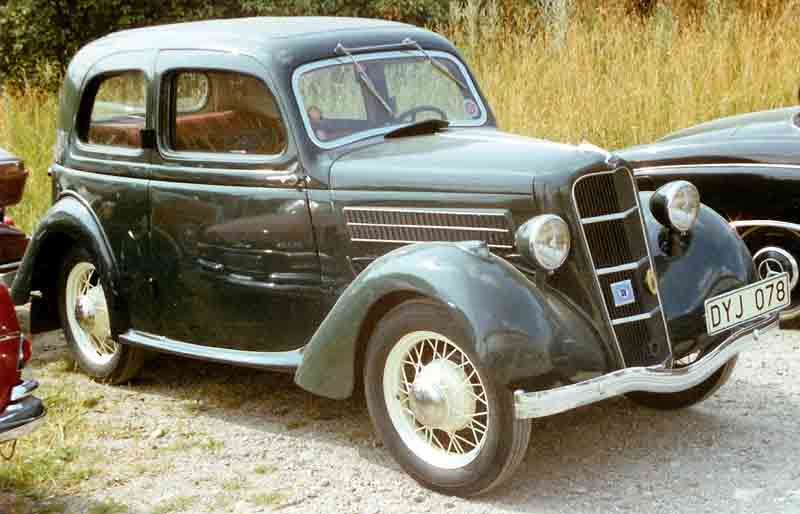

Overview
- Manufacturer: Ford UK
- Production: 1934–1937
- Assembly: United Kingdom: Ford Dagenham

Body and chassis
- Body style: 2 and 4-door saloon, tourer.

Powertrain
- Engine: 1.2 L Ford Sidevalve engine

Dimensions
- Wheelbase: 90 inches (2.28 m)
- Length: 145 inches (3.69 m)
- Width: 57 inches (1.44 m)
- Height: 63 inches (1.60 m)
- Curb weight: 1736 pounds (787 kg)

Chronology
- Predecessor: Ford Model Y
- Successor: Ford 7W

The Ford Model C Ten is a car that was built by Ford UK between 1934 and 1937. The Ten moniker signifies its 10 British fiscal horsepower. The car was also assembled in Spain (Barcelona) between 1934 and 1936. The German version produced in the same period was named the Ford Eifel.

The car used an enlarged version of the side valve engine fitted to the Ford Model Y; it was increased to a capacity of 1172 cc by increasing the bore from 56.6 mm to 63.5 mm but keeping the stroke at 92.5 mm. A standard engine would produce 30 bhp (22 kW) at 4000 rpm. This engine became a favourite for many engine tuners post-WWII and gave a start to several sports car makers including Lotus Cars, and remained in production until 1962. Suspension was by the Ford system of transverse leaf springs with rigid axles front and rear, a system little changed since the Model T. A three speed gearbox was fitted.

A four-seat tourer, now much sought after, joined the saloons in mid 1935 and a de-luxe version, the CX, with chromium-plated trim was available from late 1935 to early 1937.

The car could reach 70 mph (110 km/h) and return 35 miles (56 km) to an (Imperial) gallon.

The Model C Ten's engine was also used in the limited-trial Ausfod automobile, manufactured in Manchester from 1947 to 1948.

== The Model C in Australia ==
The Model C was released in Australia in 1935 and was offered in roadster, coupe, saloon, van and roadster utility bodystyles.
