= Ausfod =

The Ausfod was an automobile manufactured by the Ausfod Motor Engineering Co Ltd in Chorlton-on-Medlock, Manchester from 1947 to 1948. It was one of the few trials specials which was offered for sale to the public. It used a Ford Model C Ten engine, Austin Seven chassis, LMB trials front axle, and a remote control gearbox.

An aerodynamic sports car was advertised along with the trials car, but it is not clear as to whether any were made.

== See also ==
- List of car manufacturers of the United Kingdom
