= Ford 7Y =

Ford Model 7Y
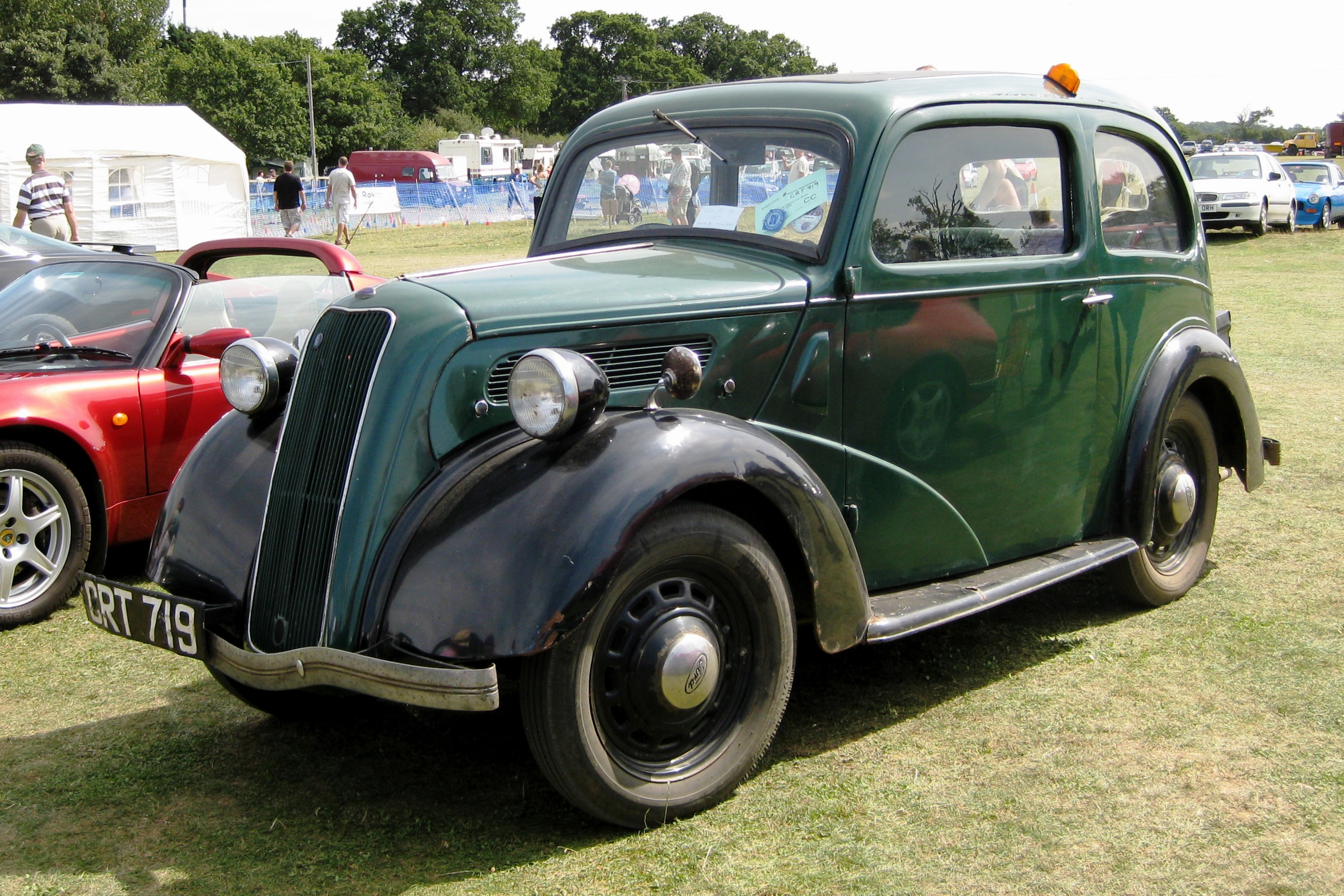

Overview
- Manufacturer: Ford UK
- Also called: Ford Eight
- Production: 1938–1939
- Assembly: United Kingdom: Ford Dagenham

Body and chassis
- Body style: 2-door saloon; 2-door tourer

Powertrain
- Engine: 933 cc (56.9 cu in) straight-4

Dimensions
- Wheelbase: 90 in (230 cm)
- Length: 148 in (380 cm)
- Width: 57 in (140 cm)
- Curb weight: 1,540 lb (700 kg)

Chronology
- Predecessor: Ford Model Y
- Successor: Ford Anglia

Ford 7Y is a car built by Ford UK from 1938 until 1939. During that time 65,098 cars were produced.

The car was officially marketed as a Ford Eight, and was a rebodied and slightly larger version of the Model Y. The car was powered by a 933 cc (56.9 cu in) 8 hp (RAC horsepower) Ford sidevalve engine.

A minor facelift, unveiled in September 1939, resulted in the first Anglia.

The car sported some unusual features such as openable rear windows that were located in the main body work as this was only a two-door vehicle. A rear wheel cover was available on the de-luxe models with the standard version also having a recess in the rear bodywork to accept the spare wheel, albeit not covered. The storage of the spare wheel in this manner mimics the styling of the V8 Pilot. The 7Y was also the last model to be fitted with a 'kink' in the front bumper before the simpler straight bumpers were introduced on the Anglia (E04A). The 'kink' and accompanying opening in the bottom of the grille allowed for starting the engine with a hand crank.

== Ford 8hp E94A Roadster ==
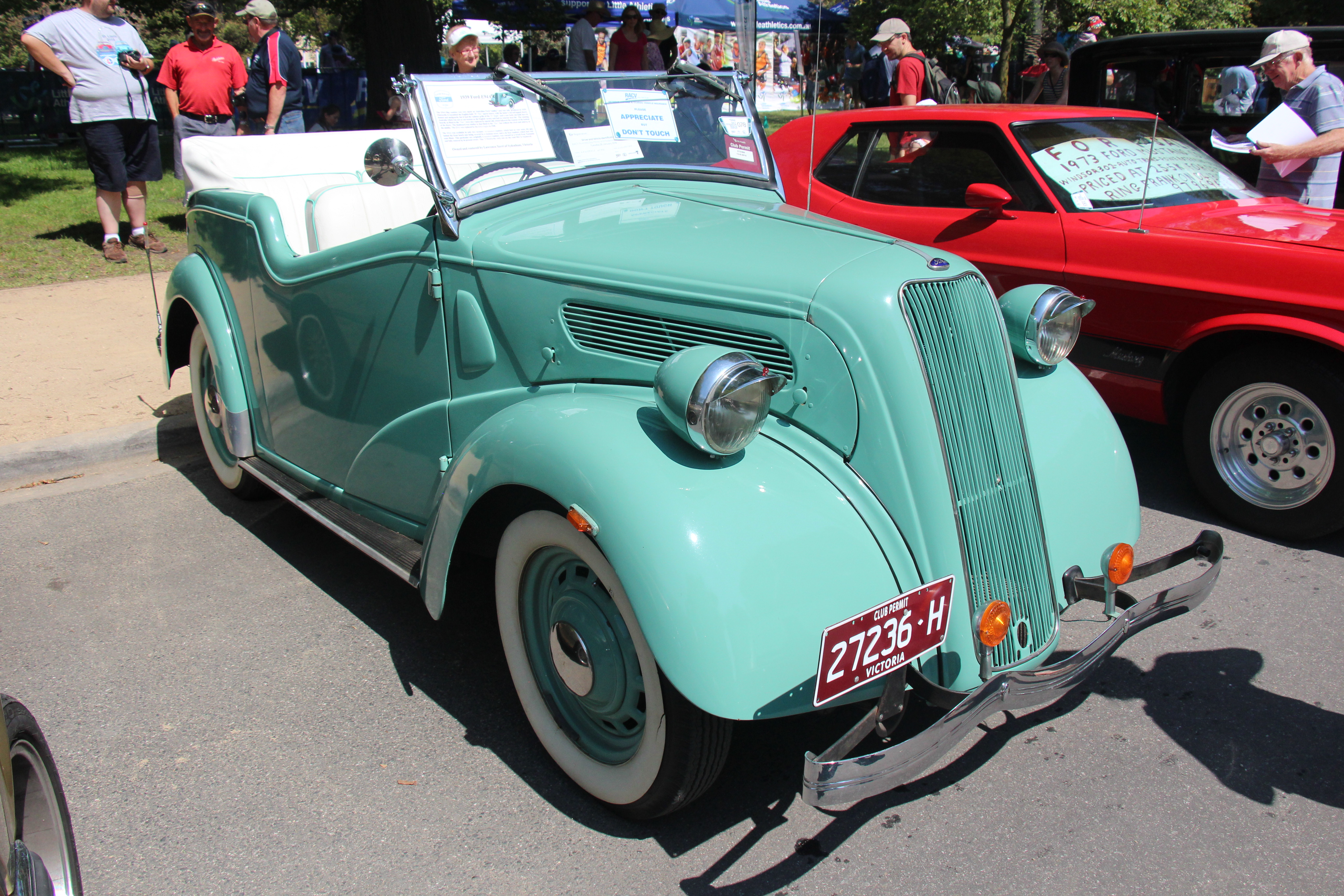
Ford 8hp E94A Roadster

For 1939 the Y7 tourer was replaced by the 8 hp (6 kW) E94A Roadster. It retained the front styling, 8 hp engine and 90-inch wheelbase of the 7Y tourer but featured different rear panels. The E94A was produced only for the 1939 model year.
