= Ford CX =

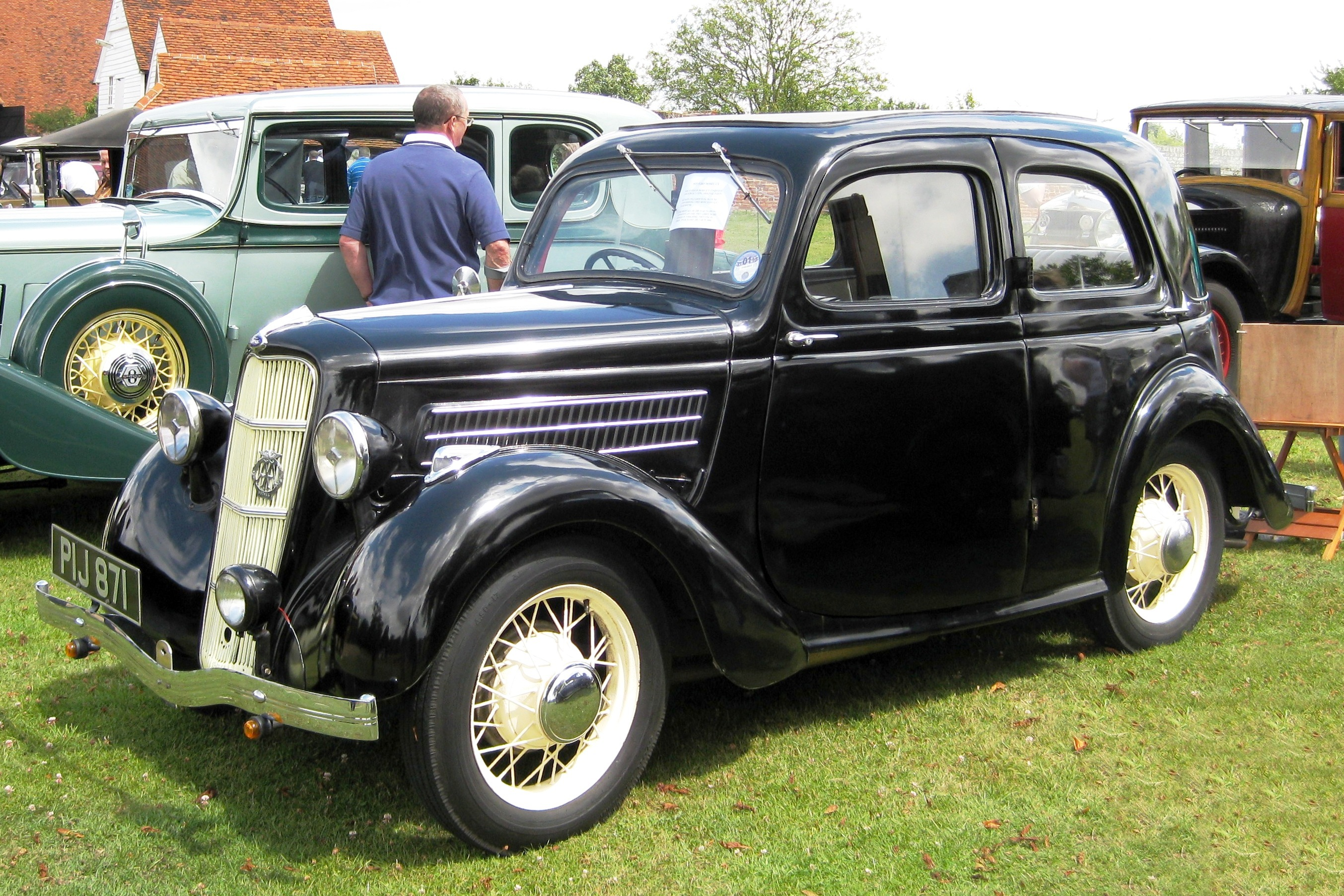

Overview
- Manufacturer: Ford UK
- Production: 1935–1937

Body and chassis
- Related: Ford Model C Ten

Powertrain
- Engine: 1172 cc Sidevalve I4

Chronology
- Successor: Ford Model CX Tourer

The Ford CX is a car that was produced by Ford UK from 1935 to 1937. During that period 96,553 cars were produced. It was powered by a 1172 cc Ford Sidevalve engine. It was a deluxe version of the Ford Model C Ten.
