= Roadster utility =

Car body style

A roadster utility — also known as a "roadster pickup" or "light delivery" — is an automobile with an open-topped roadster body and a rear cargo bed. The concept is similar to that of the coupe utility, however with a convertible roof instead of a fixed steel roof.

In the United States, this body style was called a roadster pickup and was popular during the 1920s and early 1930s, some surviving as restored vintage cars or "jalopy" relics of curiosity. Several manufacturers like Ford or Dodge offered it as standard models in their commercial vehicle catalogues.

In Australia, this body style was also called a "light delivery".

== Examples ==
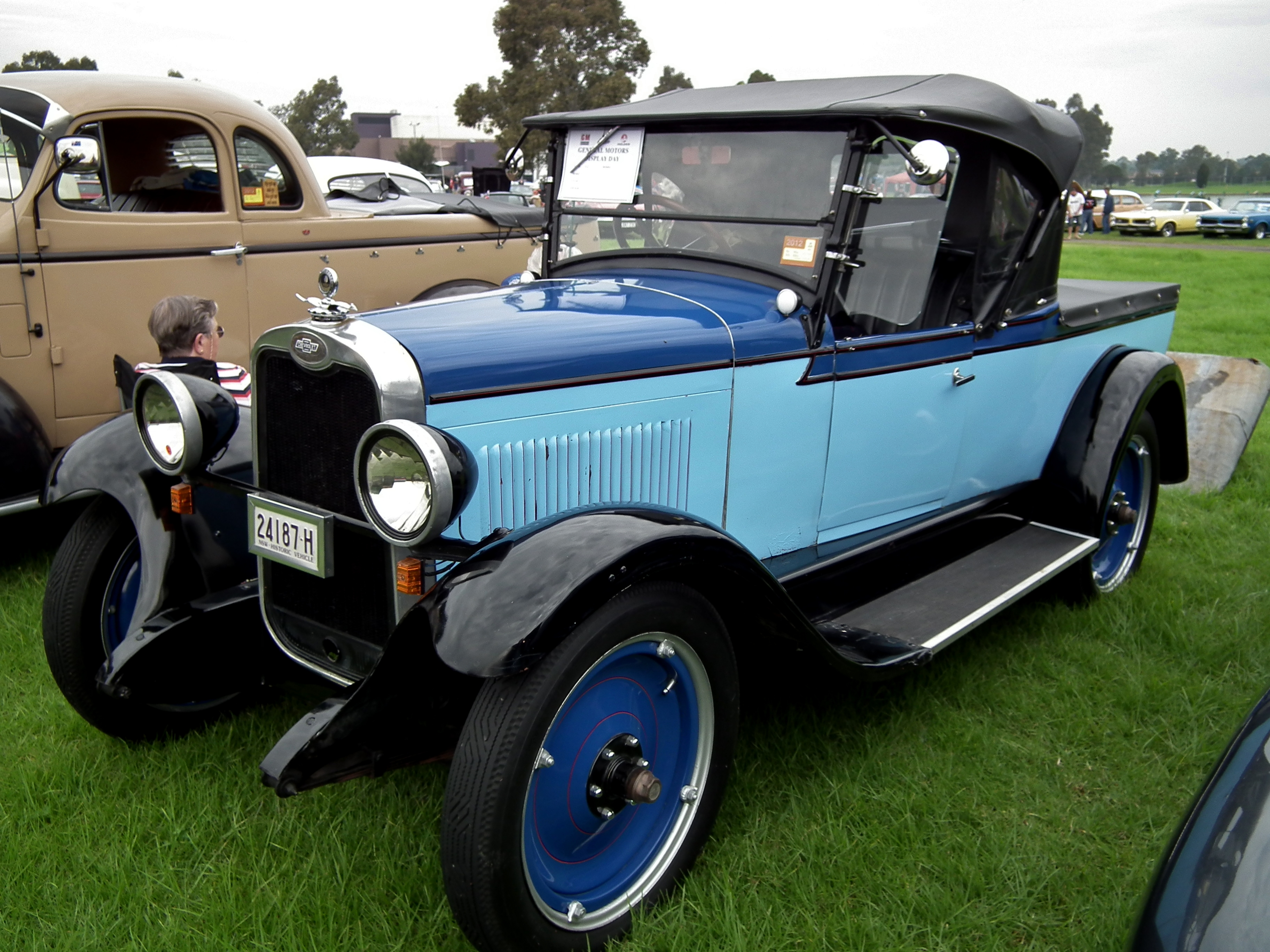
1927 Chevrolet National roadster utility

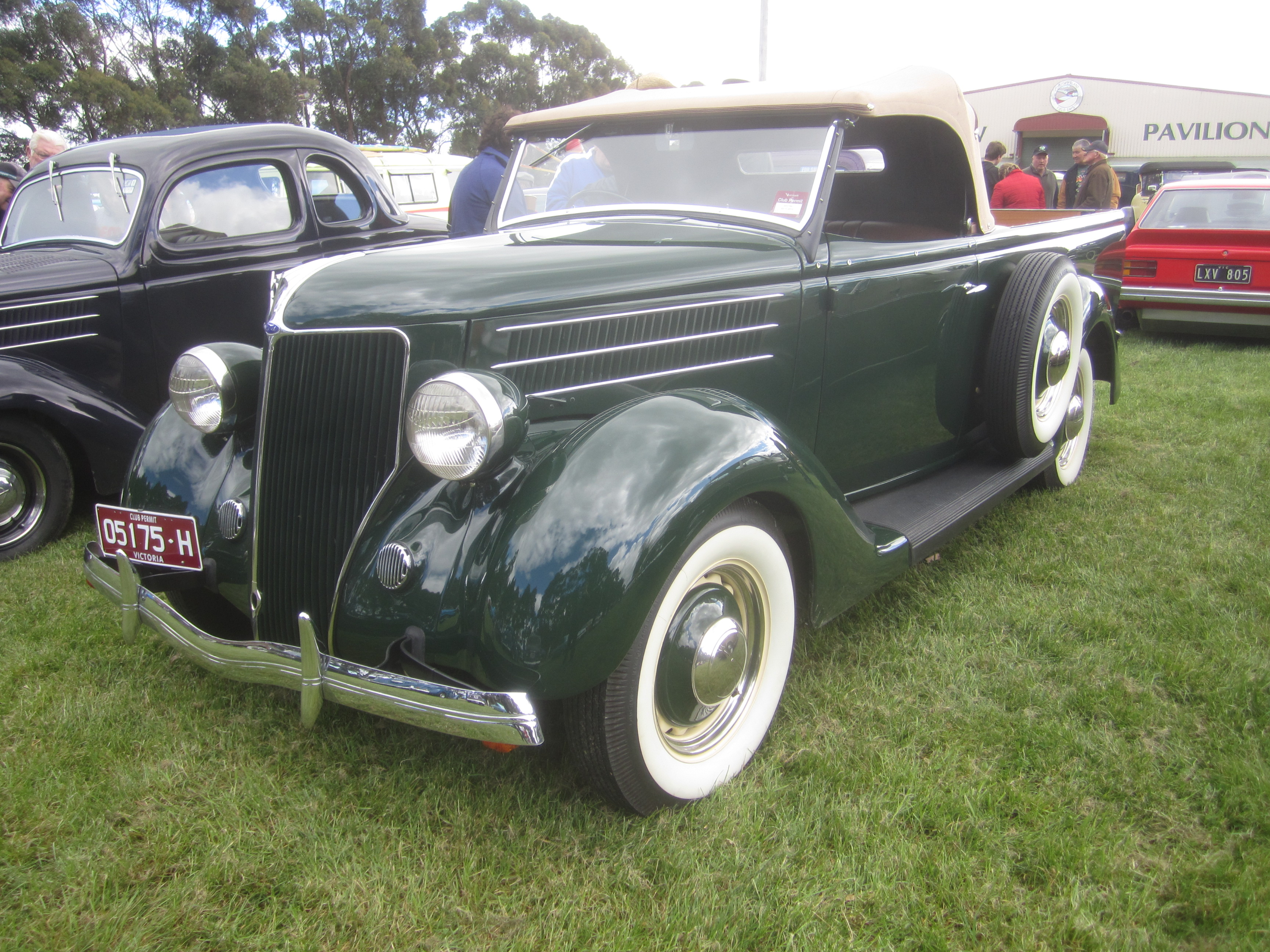
1936 Ford Model 48 roadster utility

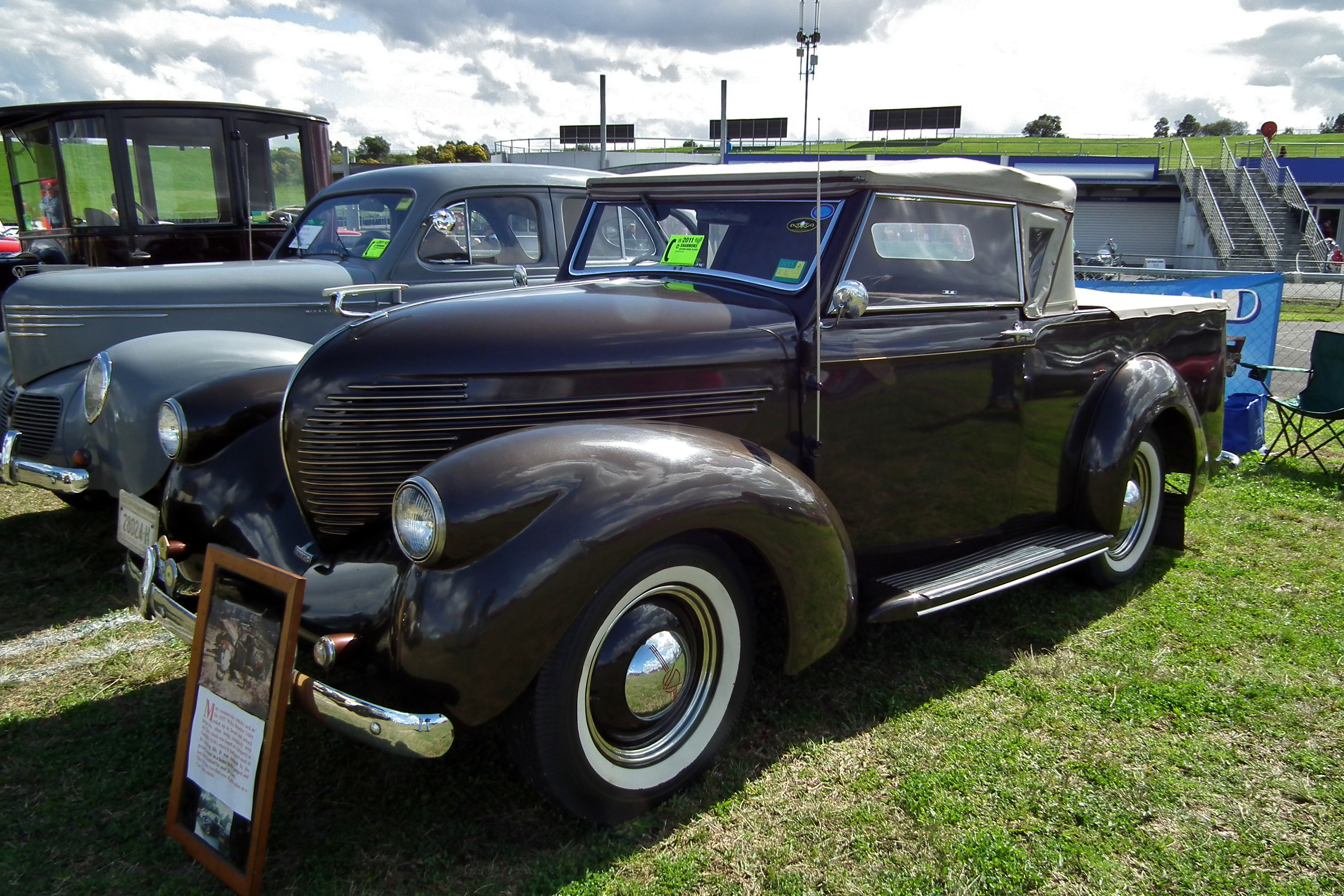
1937 Willys roadster utility

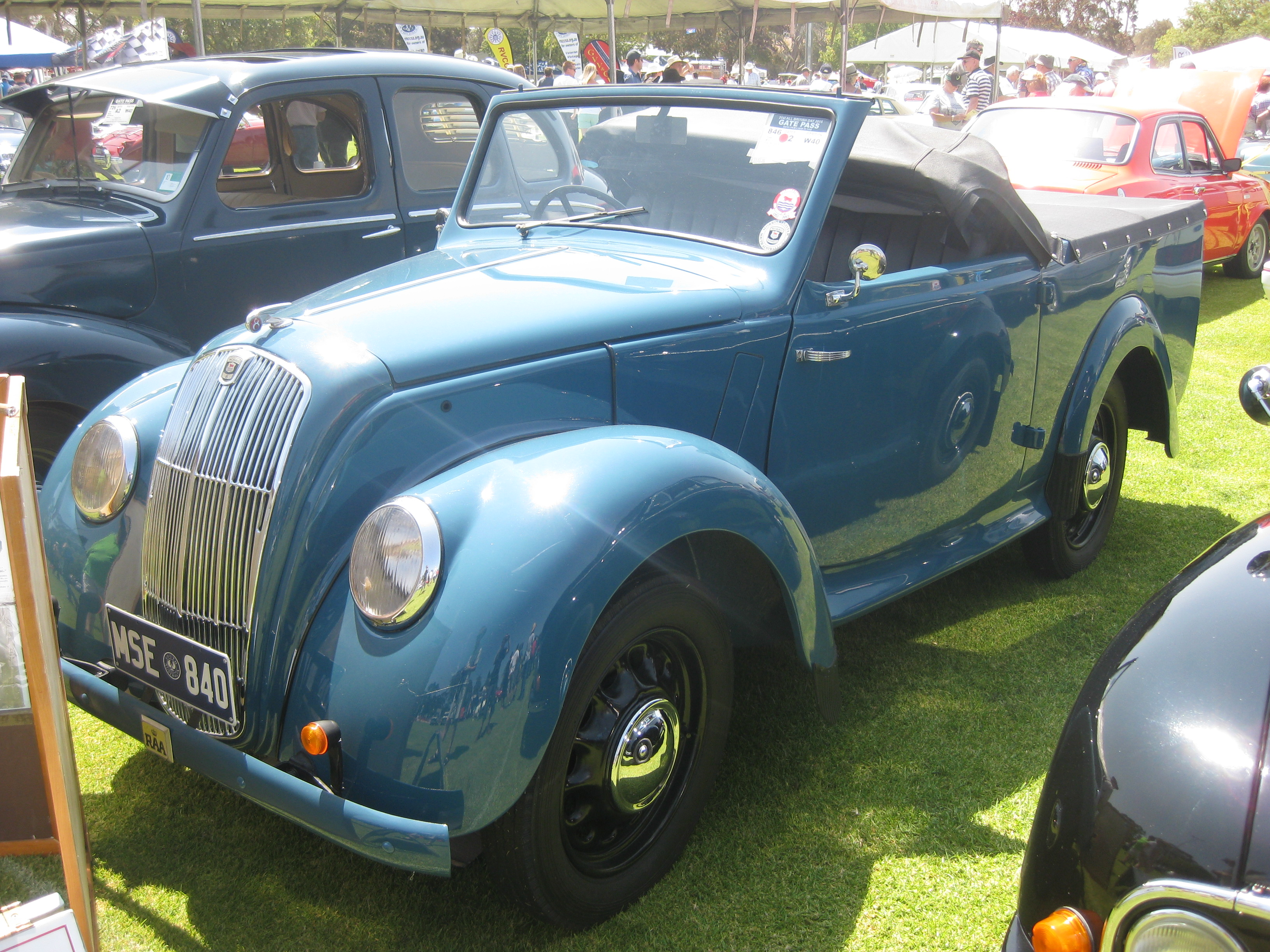
1946 Morris 8/40 Series E roadster utility

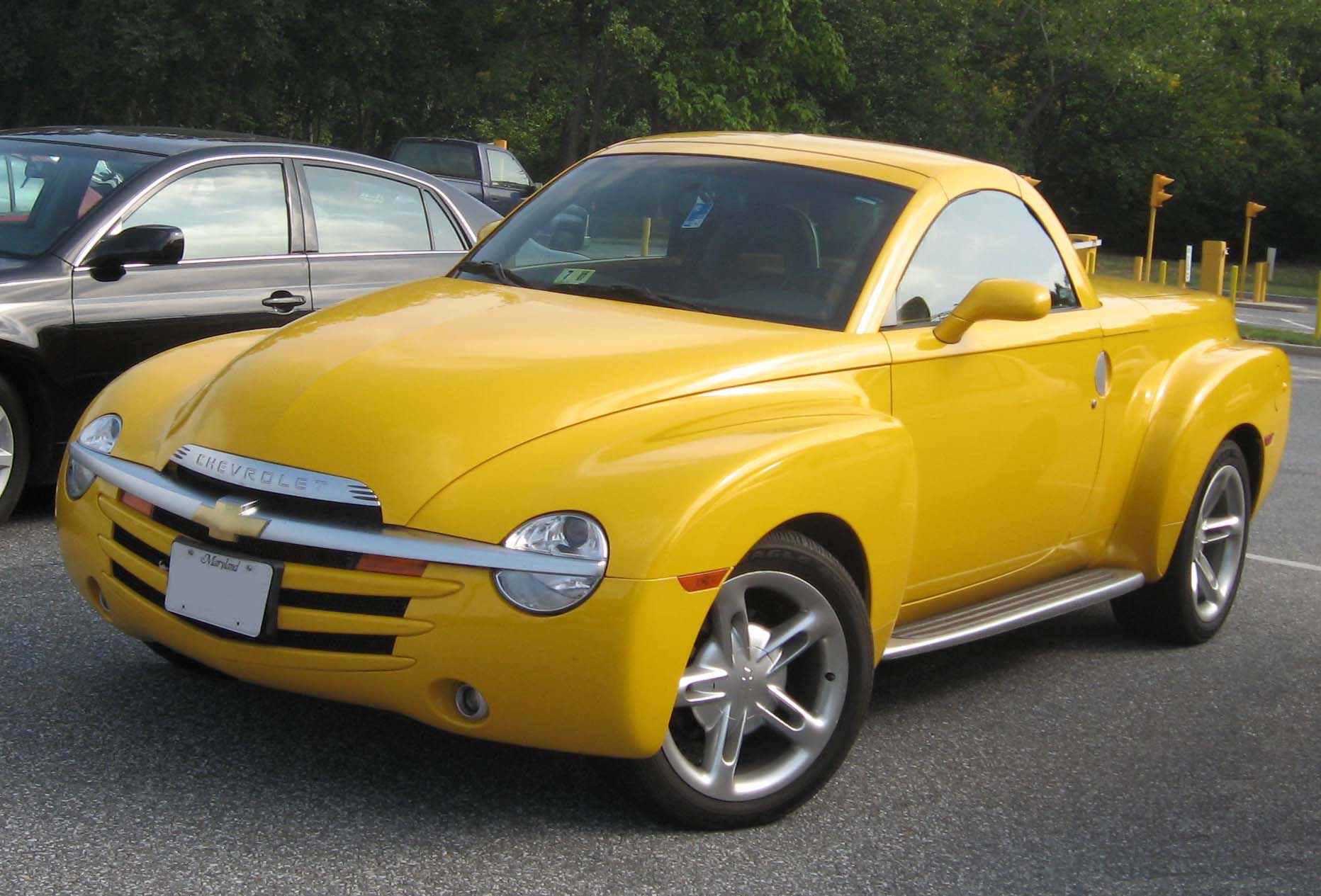
2003-2006 Chevrolet SSR

== See also ==
- Ute (vehicle), an Australian and New Zealand term for similar utility vehicles.
- Coupé utility
