= Ford of Europe =

Automotive manufacturing subsidiary of Ford Motor Company

Ford of Europe GmbH
- Type: Subsidiary
- Industry: Automotive
- Founded: 1967; 59 years ago, in Cork Ireland
- Headquarters: Cologne, Germany
- Number of locations: Seven manufacturing facilities in five countries
- Area served: Europe
- Key people: Christian Weingaertner (General Manager of Passenger Vehicles, of Ford Europe)
- Products: Automobiles
- Number of employees: 29,100 (2023)
- Parent: Ford Motor Company (1967–present)
- Divisions: TrustFord
- Subsidiaries: Henry Ford & Son Ltd.; Ford-Werke GmbH; Ford of Britain; Ford España; Ford France; Ford Italia; Ford Romania; Ford Otosan (41%)
- Website: ford.eu

Ford of Europe GmbH is a subsidiary company of the Ford Motor Company founded in 1967 in Cork, Ireland, with headquarters in Cologne, Germany.

== History ==
Ford of Europe was founded in 1967 by the merger of Ford of Britain and Ford Germany along with the Irish Henry Ford & Son Ltd. The front-engined Ford Transit range of panel vans launched in 1965, was the first formal co-operation between the two entities, simultaneously developed to replace the German Ford Taunus Transit and the British Ford Thames 400E. Prior to this, the two companies avoided marketing their vehicles in one another's domestic markets, and in much of the rest of western Europe were direct competitors, with totally separate product lines, despite being owned by the same American parent, in a similar manner to General Motors' Opel and Vauxhall subsidiaries at the same time – indeed GM followed Ford's precedent in the 1970s by merging the operations of Opel and Vauxhall into General Motors Europe. The process took several years to complete, as new model ranges arrived and the older model ranges were gradually phased out.

One of the key justifications for keeping separate divisions was to circumvent the high trade tariffs imposed on vehicles being exported between Britain and the European Economic Community, however once the UK joined the bloc in 1973, it made sense to standardise the model ranges throughout Britain and Continental Europe. Crucially merging the two companies' operations and having a common product range would allow Ford to double source cars and components from either British or Continental plants (the Fiesta for example was simultaneously assembled at Dagenham, Valencia and Cologne), something which was especially important due to the fraught industrial relations problems which plagued the British motor industry in the 1970s, and would prove crucial in Ford's ascendancy in the UK market and overtaking the troubled British Leyland.

=== 1967–1973: Cortina and Escort ===
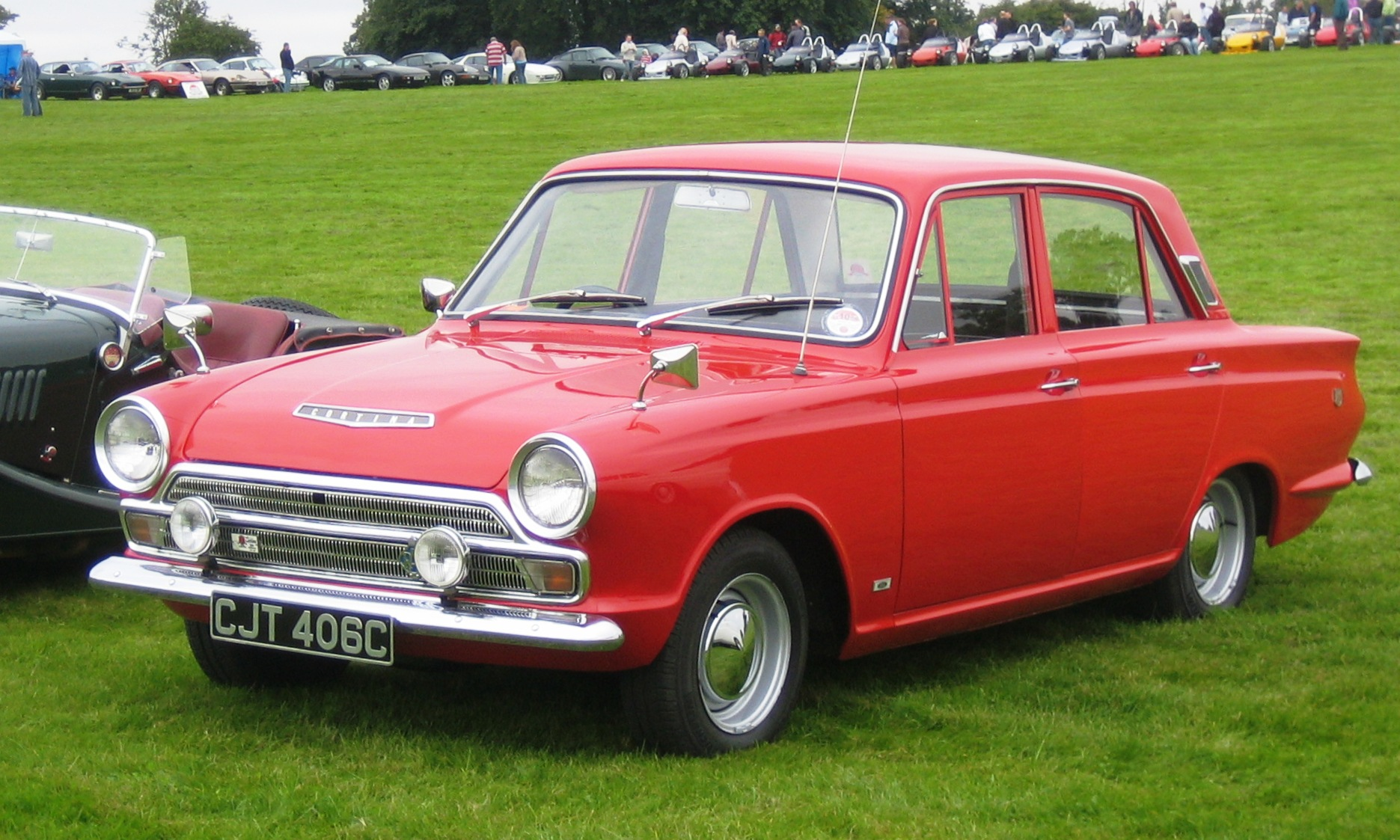
1965 Ford Cortina Mark I

The first new model launched after the creation of Ford of Europe was the Escort, built in England from October 1967 and launched to market at the beginning of 1968. The Escort was a rear-wheel drive small family saloon that took the place of the British Anglia range and was built in both Britain and from 1970, Germany, although it was sold there from the outset. It was first available as a two-door saloon and later in estate, van and four-door saloon bodystyles. Power came from 950 CC, 1100 CC, and 1300 CC petrol engines. Later there was also a 2000 cc unit which came in the RS2000 performance version and was capable of 110 mph (180 km/h). It quickly became popular with buyers, outselling key UK competitors from BMC (later British Leyland), Vauxhall (Opel in Germany) and the Rootes Group. The Escort would never achieve such dominance in Europe's largest auto market, but nevertheless took significant market share from the Opel and Volkswagen competitors of the time.

Ford Europe's second new car launch was the Capri sporting coupé at the beginning of 1969. Loosely based on Ford UK's rear-wheel drive Mk II Cortina saloon platform, it came with engines ranging from 1300 cc to 3000 cc and was made in Britain and Germany (with a different range of German V4 and V6 engines) and was an instant success, frequently featuring as one of Britain's top 10 best-selling cars and also doing well in most other European markets.

August 1970 saw the launch of the British Ford Cortina Mk III and its German cousin, the Taunus (replacing the Taunus 12M and 15M). The British and German models were based on the same platform, but had different sheet metal and used engines from their home countries, though both models could be had with the new German-built 2000cc OHC petrol engine. By 1972, the Cortina was the best-selling car in Britain and would stay at the top spot until 1981, except for 1976 when the smaller Escort was Britain's top-selling car for that year.

In March 1972, Ford Europe replaced their executive models from Britain (Zephyr/Zodiac) and Germany (17M/20M/26M) with the Consul and Granada (large saloon, estate and coupé) which was aimed directly at the Opel Rekord, Rover P6, Audi 100 and Triumph 2000. It quickly outsold its rivals in many countries and in 1973 was the tenth best-selling car in Britain. Like the Capri and Cortina/Taunus models, the early Consuls and Granadas were built in both Britain and Germany, each with a unique range of national engines.

In the early 1970s, Ford took the decision to enter the growing European supermini market and began to develop a competitor for the well-received new Fiat 127 and Renault 5. A site near Valencia, Spain, was chosen to build a new factory in order to accommodate production for the new car which was scheduled for a mid-1970s launch.

=== 1974–1980: MK 2 Escort and New Fiesta ===
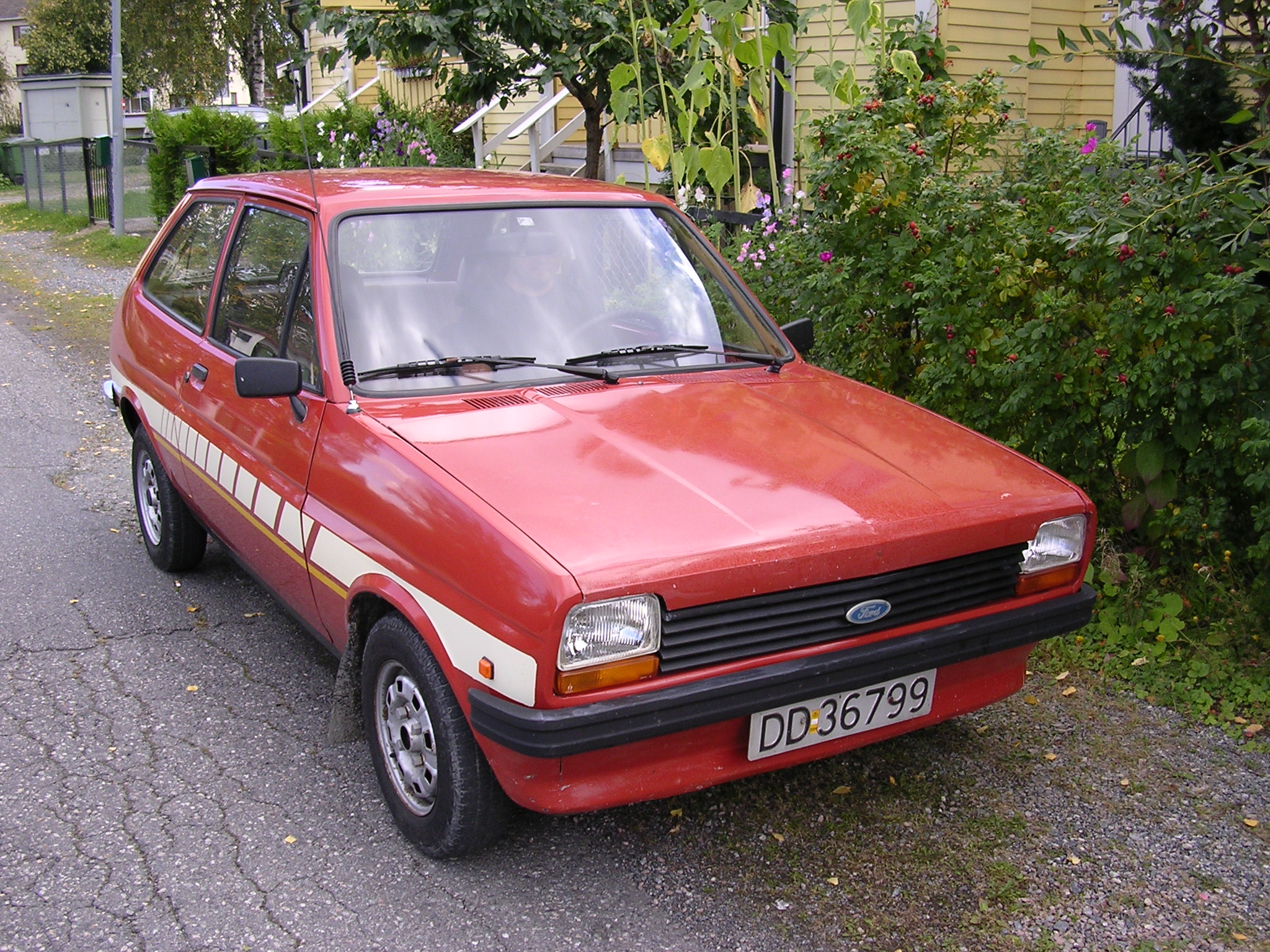
1981 Ford Fiesta MK1

A revised Capri II arrived in early 1974 which saw a hatchback replacing the traditional "boot". This was the first time that Ford had produced a car with a hatchback, adopting this new concept which had first been patented by Renault in the mid-1960s.

Ford launched the Escort II at the start of 1975 which was essentially a rebodied version of the 1968 car and was largely mechanical identical, despite the larger, squarer body. The entry-level 950 cc engine which was rare in any country, was discontinued.

In 1975, Ford overtook British Leyland (the combine which included Austin, Morris and Rover) as the most popular make of car in the United Kingdom.

1976 saw Ford Europe enter the supermini market with its first ever front-wheel-drive model. The Fiesta I was built at the company's new Valencia plant in Spain (and would also be produced at Dagenham and Cologne) and came with 950 cc, 1100 cc and 1300 cc petrol engines. It was briefly exported to the United States and Canada between 1978 and 1980. From 1981, it was available with a 1600 cc unit for the sporty XR2 version. In Britain where it launched in February 1977 and most of the rest of Europe took to it straight away and it was quickly among the best-selling cars in most of the continent, fighting off competition from the Volkswagen Polo, Renault 5, Fiat 127, Vauxhall Chevette and Peugeot 104.

The new Taunus saloon and estate were launched on the continent at the end of 1975, with the UK market Cortina version being launched in late September 1976. The integration of the Ford range across Europe was now virtually complete, with the different nameplates on the Taunus/Cortina being the only separator.

Ford launched the Granada II range in September 1977. In 1976, all Granada production had been concentrated to Cologne, Germany. The Consul badge was abandoned in 1975.

In 1977, Ford finally overtook British Leyland as the market leader in the UK.

The Mk III Capri coupé arrived in early 1978. By now Capri production was also concentrated at Cologne. In 1979, the Cortina/Taunus was given a very light facelift to create the "Cortina 80" (or Cortina Mk5). However, this was very much a short-term measure, as Ford was beginning to develop an all-new successor ready for a 1982 launch.

1980 saw one of the most important car launches in Ford's history. The Escort III went on sale across Britain and Europe in September that year, with its ultra-modern aerodynamic styling and updated front-wheel drive mechanical layout. It was also available as a hatchback for the first time, with the Escort-based Orion saloon not arriving until 1983. The 2000 cc engine was dropped and the range-topping Escort was now the XR3 which came with a fuel-injected 1600 cc unit. It was a huge sales success for the company throughout the 1980s, being Britain's best selling car from 1982 to 1989 and also topping the sales charts in several other countries.

=== 1981–1989: Breaking new ground ===
The 1980s saw a radical change in most of the European Fords which had begun in September 1980 when the Escort switched to front-wheel drive and a hatchback from the traditional rear-wheel drive saloon which became a huge sales success across Europe.

20 years of Cortina production came to an end in October 1982 with the launch of the new Ford Sierra. The new car retained the traditional rear-wheel-drive chassis, perhaps surprisingly at the time when a front-wheel drive system was becoming almost exclusive in this sector of car. But in place of its predecessor's conventional, square styling was Sierra's ultramodern aerodynamic styling that was way ahead of its time compared to the competition. Initial sales were disappointing, but demand soon increased and the Sierra was Britain's second best-selling car in 1983, its first full year on sale. It was built in Great Britain and Belgium and sold well in most other European countries. Cosworth versions of the Sierra were built from 1986, all of which were capable of 150 mph (240 km/h). The three-door Sierra hatchback, mostly sold with only a 1.3 petrol engine, was not a popular choice and had been discontinued by the time the Sierra was facelifted in early 1987 when a Sapphire saloon version was launched and the 1.3 engine dropped. The original Sierra Cosworth was the last model in the range to feature a three-door hatchback.

1983 saw the seven-year-old Ford Fiesta receive an updated MK2 version that retained the three-door hatchback bodyshell but smoothed out the previously boxy edges to give it a more modern look and keep it competitive with a string of new European and Japanese superminis which hit the market during 1982 and 1983. The sporty XR2 version was relaunched and its power output was increased, as well as receiving the first five-speed gearbox ever fitted to a Fiesta. Also in that year, Ford introduced a new four-door saloon to meet the demands of buyers looking for a booted alternative to the Escort and Sierra hatchbacks and estates. The saloon derived version of the Escort was named as the Orion but was aimed more upmarket than the Escort with no 1.1 litre engined version and initially only GL and Ghia trim levels. It was almost as long as a Sierra and many saw it as a true replacement for the traditional Cortina.

Ford launched another ground-breaking new car in May 1985 with the Granada-replacing Ford Scorpio, although the Granada name was retained in the United Kingdom and Ireland with "Scorpio" being used as a sub-brand for the highest specification models. It was based on a stretched version of Sierra's rear-wheel-drive chassis and was far more modern looking than any other cars in its sector at this time, being similar in appearance to the smaller Sierra. It was also the world's first volume production car to feature anti-lock brakes as standard. High equipment levels, a comfortable interior and solid build quality ensured that the German-built Scorpio was a success all over Europe and was voted European Car of the Year for 1986. A saloon version had joined the range by early 1990, as had a 2.9 V6 Cosworth high-performance hatchback while an estate version arrived in early 1992 as it was nearing replacement.

An updated Escort and Orion appeared in March 1986, called the "Mark 4", it featured Scorpio-influenced front-end styling, revised engine options and an all-new interior.

Production of the Capri coupé ended in December 1986 after 18 years and there was no replacement, although stocks of the model were sold into 1987, as sporting coupés were less popular at this time following the rise in popularity of fast hatchbacks such as the Ford Escort XR3i, Vauxhall Astra GTE, Peugeot 309 GTI and Volkswagen Golf GTI. Ford had proved successful in this sector with faster versions of the Fiesta, Escort, and Sierra.

The Sierra was facelifted in early 1987 and gained a saloon version for the first time, called the Sapphire, ensuring that it continued to sell well into the 1990s.

The third generation Fiesta was launched in March 1989 and the big news of the launch was the long-awaited availability of a five-door version, something that was already available on key rivals like the Austin Metro, Vauxhall Nova, Fiat Uno, SEAT Ibiza and the Peugeot 205. New to the range were the new 1.0 and 1.1 HCS (High Compression Swirl) petrol engines which ran alongside the long-running 1.4 unit. There was also a 1.8 diesel as well as the 1.6 fuel injected XR2i and RS Turbo sports models, the first Fiestas to feature fuel injection. Upmarket Ghia models were the first versions of the Fiesta to feature items such as electric windows and anti-lock brakes and was only available with the new five-door version.

For much of the 1980s, the Ford Escort was the most popular model of car in the world and from 1982 to 1989, it was the best-selling new car in the UK every year. Despite the launch of the MK4 in March 1986, it started to look a little dated by the end of the decade in the face of newer rivals like the Rover 200, Peugeot 309, Fiat Tipo and Renault 19.

=== 1990–1997: Into the 1990s ===
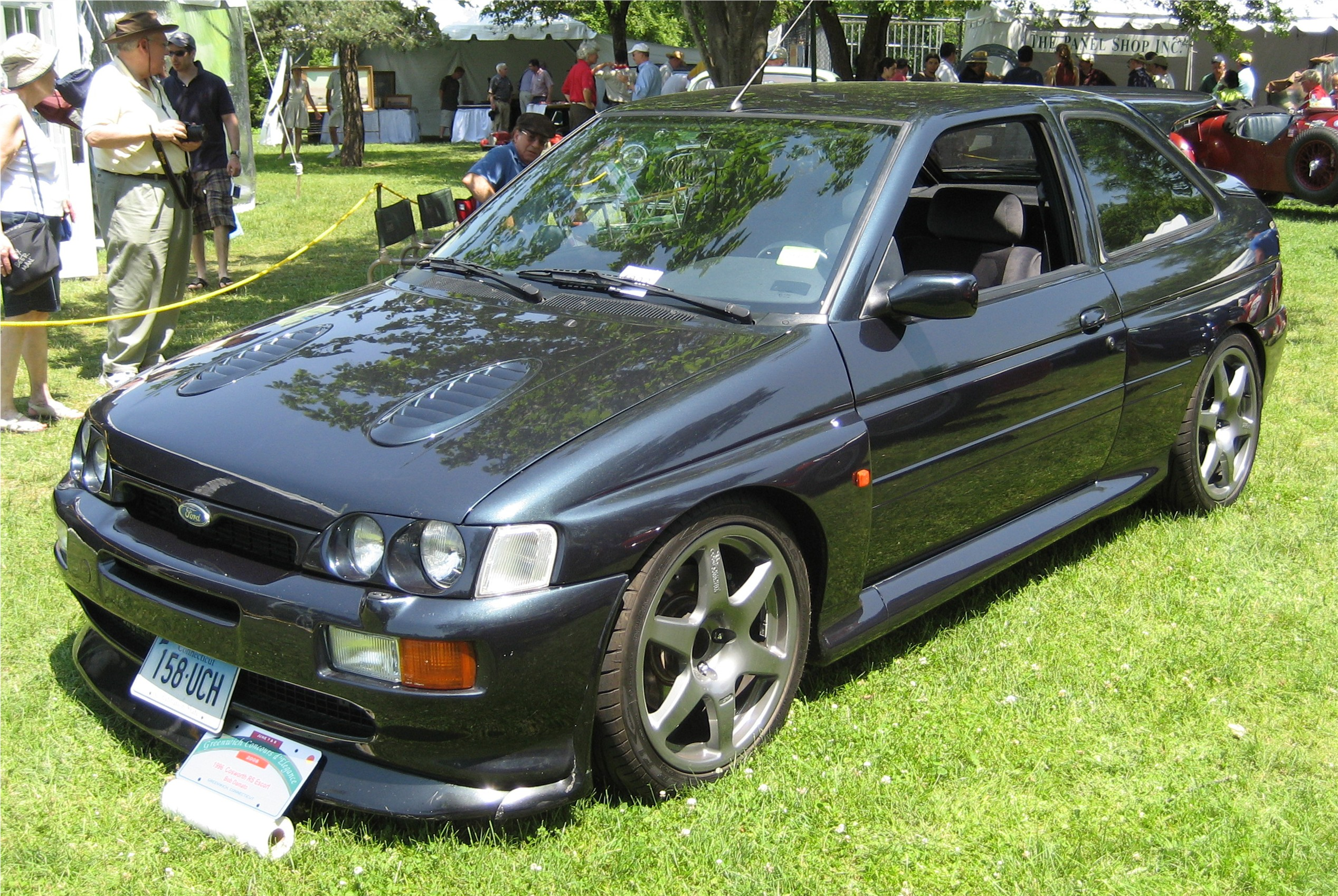
1996 Ford Escort RS Cosworth

The Mk5 Escort was launched in September 1990, along with the Orion saloon, but the motoring public and press gave it mixed to negative reviews. The car's styling lacked the flair of some rivals and it received mostly negative ratings for ride and handling, while it also retained the engine line-up of the previous generation with 1.3, 1.4 and 1.6 petrol units and a 1.8 diesel. The standard Escort models were later joined by the RS2000, XR3i and RS Cosworth performance versions that attracted a much more positive reaction. The RS2000 nameplate had been abandoned back in 1980 and the new version was undoubtedly the best, with its 2.0 16-valve I4 engine and the option of four-wheel drive, as well as its top speed of more than 130 mph (210 km/h). The RS Cosworth was a turbocharged version of the RS2000 and had a top speed of 150 mph (240 km/h) which helped bolster its fortunes in international rallies.

In spite of this and impressive new models being launched by rival companies Vauxhall and Rover, Ford were still firmly positioned at the top of the British car sales charts in the early 1990s and enjoyed a strong market share in virtually all European countries, expanding into Eastern Europe at the beginning of the 1990s following the collapse of communism. They even enlisted the help of Brian May to record a new song, "Driven by You", which featured in their new TV advertising campaign for the whole Ford range in the UK.

Ford responded to criticism of the Escort's shortcomings in September 1992 with a minor facelift which saw the introduction of its new 1.4, 1.6 and 1.8 Zetec 16-valve units, the latter of which also found its way into the Fiesta RS1800. The Orion also received the same changes, only for the name to be shelved a year later and the saloon models absorbed into the Escort range. Ride and handling was also improved.

For 1993, Ford introduced a standard driver's airbag on all production models, with many cars also coming with a passenger's airbag as either standard or optional equipment.

February 1993 saw Ford launch a ground-breaking new family car in the shape of the Mondeo, the replacement for the Sierra made to rival the newer Opel Vectra/Vauxhall Cavalier, Peugeot 405 and Nissan Primera. Finally making the transition to front-wheel drive, the Mondeo came with a range of new 16-valve Zetec petrol engines as well as a 2.5 V6 that joined the line-up in 1994. It was also one of the first volume production cars to feature an airbag as standard. Hatchback, saloon and estate versions made up the range which won European Car of the Year accolade the following year. 1993 also saw the launch of its first European 4x4 model, the Maverick, which was based on the Nissan Terrano II. However, the Maverick was not a strong seller and it was discontinued in early 1999. 1994 was the year where Ford regained leadership of the large family car sector market in Britain in terms of sales, as the Vauxhall Cavalier had been the best seller of this size for the previous four years. From 1996 to 2001, Ford also imported its Explorer SUV to Europe from the USA, but like the smaller Spanish-built Maverick, it was not a strong seller either.

Ford reentered the coupé market in early 1994 with its American-built, Mazda-based Probe. Available with 2.0 16-valve and 2.5 V6 petrol engines, the Probe was well regarded for its handling and performance but failed to sell as well as Ford had hoped and was withdrawn from Europe three years later. Its American-built replacement, the Ford Cougar, was imported from Europe but was even shorter-lived and less successful in Europe, with imports finishing after just two years.

October 1994 saw the launch of the second generation Scorpio which replaced the long-running Granada nameplate in the UK and Ireland and sold with saloon and estate models only, the model quickly gained attention due to its controversial styling which was often criticised in the motoring press.

1995 saw Ford launch its MK4 Fiesta and MK6 Escort ranges to keep them on the pace with the ever-growing number of new rivals that were threatening to decimate Ford's market share. Another new car launch that year was the Galaxy multi-purpose vehicle in June that was based upon the VW Sharan which quickly went straight to the top of the people carrier sales charts, remaining in production until the launch of an all-new replacement in 2006.

Ford entered the city car market in September 1996 with its oddly-named and oddly-styled Ka and was beaten into second place in the 1997 European Car of the Year award by the Renault Scenic. It made use of the Fiesta's chassis and 1300 cc petrol engine which gave it strong handling for such a small car. Going against the appeal were its cramped rear seats and tiny boot, but it managed to sell well for most of its 12-year production run. A month later in October, the Mondeo gained a facelift which saw the exterior styling brought up to date and the seating redesigned to improve space for rear seat passengers.

The Fiesta chassis also spawned the stylish Puma coupé in 1997 which included the Fiesta's floorpan and 1.4 engine as well as its own 1.7 unit. The Puma won plaudits for its styling, handling and performance. Despite its popularity, there was no direct successor when production finished in 2002.

Ford pulled out of the executive car market in 1998 upon the demise of its Scorpio which had replaced the Granada four years earlier. As well as a Europe-wide transition from mainstream brands to prestige brands during the 1990s, the Scorpio's sales potential was held back by its controversial styling.

=== 1998–2003: New Edge design ===
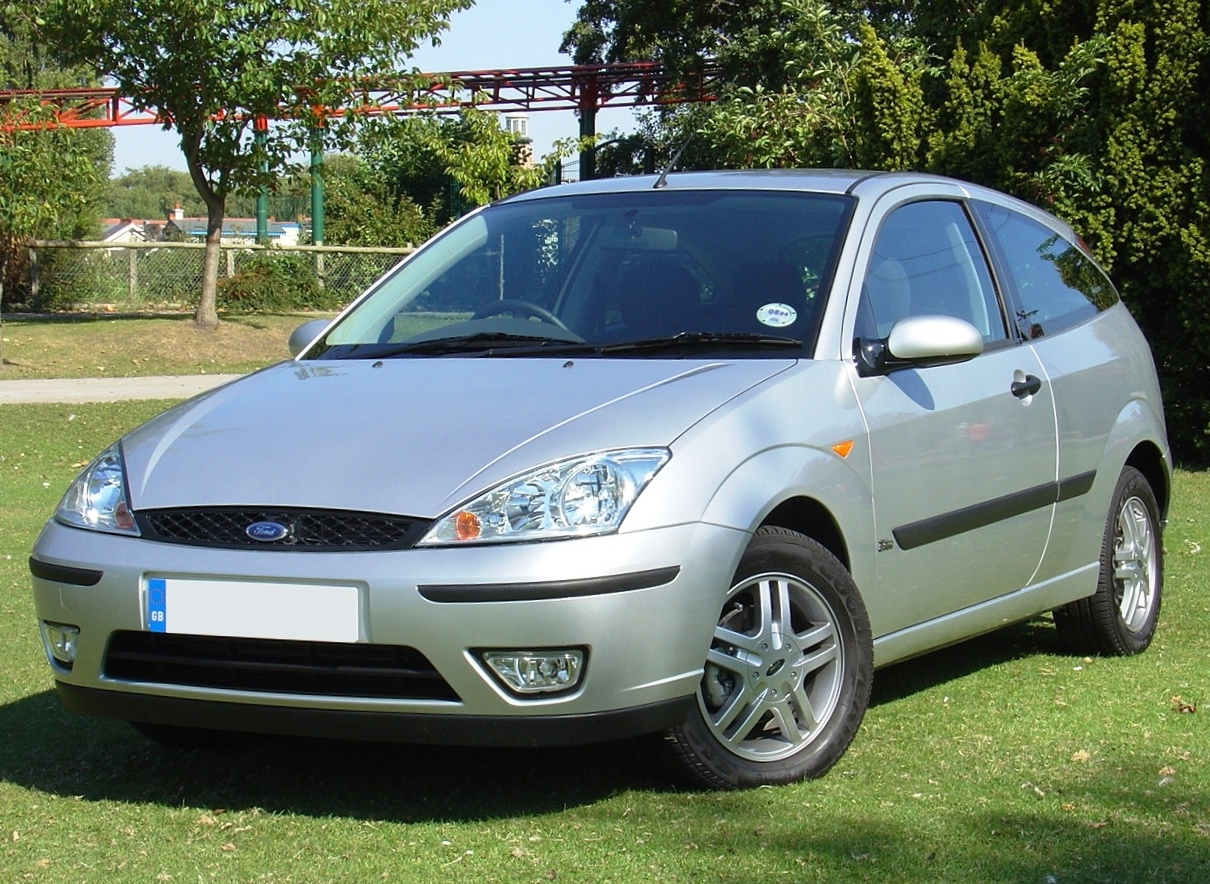
2001 Ford Focus Mark I

In the late 1990s, Ford adopted a distinctive "New Edge" design on its model range. Some of the cars adopting this eye-catching new look were entirely new, while others were facelifted versions of earlier and more conservative designs.

The end was in sight for the Escort in October 1998 when its distinctively-styled successor, the Focus, went on sale. Its radical design meant that Ford kept the Escort on sale alongside it for two years, the van until 2002, giving buyers a more conventionally-styled alternative, perhaps in fear of a repeat of the controversy it had faced some 16 years earlier when the Sierra went on sale. But Ford need not have worried about the public's reaction to the new Focus which was European Car of the Year for 1999 and being one of the best-selling cars on the continent. At the height of its production, there was a new Ford Focus coming off a production line at an average of one every 12 seconds (Saarlouis, Germany, Valencia, Spain, Wayne, Michigan, USA and Hermosillo, Mexico). However, the Focus was never built in Britain.

1998 also saw the launch of the Probe's replacement: the Cougar. Like its predecessor, the Cougar was built in the USA and used 2.0 and 2.5 petrol engines. Unlike its predecessor, it was based on the front-wheel-drive chassis of the Mondeo. It was very spacious for a coupé and offered superb road-holding and cruising ability. Sales were relatively low in Europe and it was dropped in Europe after 2000, with sales limited to its home market.

In 1999, Ford's European headquarters relocated from Brentwood in England to its current (2019) location in Cologne, Germany. It was from the adjacent Cologne factory that the 30 millionth Ford, a Fiesta, emerged from the production line on 19 November 1999. The aging MK4 Fiesta received a facelift in the autumn of 1999 and continued to attract huge sales thanks to its excellent ride and handling that disguised its age well. The interior was, by now, one of the smartest in the supermini sector, though interior space, particularly in the back, was far from the best. This shortcoming was solved in Spring 2002 when the all-new MK5 Fiesta went on sale. This new Fiesta was to be built at Ford Cologne and Ford Valencia, each plant producing one Fiesta every 27 seconds. This also marked the end of Ford passenger car production in the UK after some 90 years, though commercial vehicles continued to be produced at Dagenham alongside the engine assembly for the passenger vehicles. In addition, Ford's Halewood plant was converted for Jaguar X-Type assembly in 2001. Ford also continued to build vans at its Southampton plant until relocating production to Turkey in 2013.

The Ford Mondeo was relaunched in an all-new MK2 version in late 2000 and was pipped for the European Car of the Year award by the Alfa Romeo 147. The new Mondeo was more competitively priced than its predecessor, but its real strengths were its excellent accommodation and driving experience which put it back on top of the large family car sector. Although demand for cars of this size dipped slightly across Europe during the 2000s, the Mondeo remained Britain's most popular large family car until 2007, when it was outsold by the facelifted Vauxhall Vectra.

The Maverick returned in late 2000, this time being a rebadged US-market Escape which launched in the same year, but sales were slow and was axed after 4 years.

The demise of the Puma in 2002 left Ford without a competitor in the coupé sector once more while the Focus ST170 which launched at that time could be seen as an indirect successor.

Ford entered the expanding compact MPV market in late 2003 with the Ford Focus C-Max which was unusually, the first car on the platform that would spawn the next generation Focus hatchback a year later. 2003 also saw a convertible version of the Ka launched as the StreetKa alongside a facelifted Mondeo.

=== 2004–2011: Kinetic Design ===
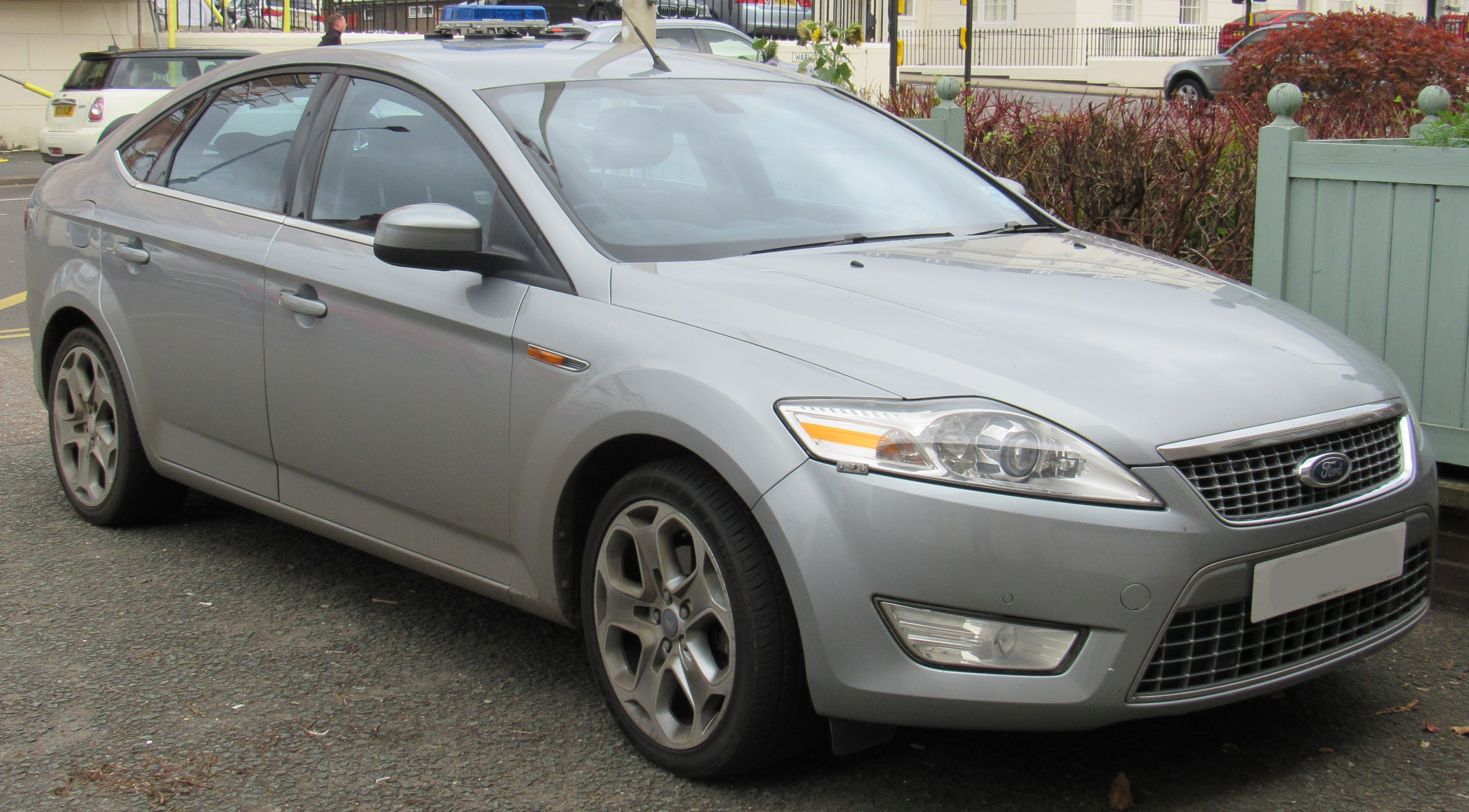
2009 Ford Mondeo Titanium X IV

The second generation Focus hatchback, saloon and estate models went on sale in late 2004, picking up where the original model left off. Excellent ride and handling, good equipment levels, solid build quality and a comfortable interior all won praise for those who experienced the new car. The only major criticism of the Focus was its unoriginal styling which differed little from that of its predecessor but it remained one of the most popular cars in Europe during a production life which lasted more than six years.

November 2005 saw the launch of a facelifted Fiesta which offered new styling inside and out as well as new colour options.

2006 saw Ford launch two new people carriers, the S-MAX and the Ford Galaxy MK2. Both cars used the same underpinnings, but the S-MAX was a cheaper and sportier alternative to the more upmarket and practical Galaxy. The S-MAX then became the first full-size people carrier to be voted European Car of the Year.

Ford launched the third generation Mondeo in May 2007 and had a facelift in Autumn 2010. The new generations of the Fiesta and Ka launched in late 2008.

4 years after the Maverick was axed, Ford returned to the 4x4 market in early 2008 with the Focus-based Kuga which unlike its Maverick predecessors became a strong seller.

In 2005, Ford celebrated its 30th anniversary as Britain's most popular car brand. The Focus was the country's top-selling car, while the Fiesta occupied fifth place and the Mondeo ninth. In spite of this, the gap between Ford and its competitors was about as narrow as it had ever been, with Vauxhall and Renault just a short margin behind Ford in sales figures.

In 2008, Ford acquired a majority stake in Automobile Craiova of Romania. The Ford Transit Connect was Ford's first model produced in Craiova, followed in 2012 by the new Fiesta-based MPV B-Max and the small displacement engine 1.0-litre EcoBoost.

=== 2011–present: One Ford ===
The "One Ford" policy was introduced in the 2010s. The third generation Focus launch in early 2011 and had a facelift in late-2014. This generation had a range of two types, a five-door hatchback and five-door estate. Discontinued saloon and three-door hatchback Focus models of the second generation continued to be sold in some European nations. 20 years after the original model launched, the Focus entered its fourth-generation: it saw Vignale and Active versions join the line-up; a restyle and updated mechanical components.

In Early 2013, the Fiesta had a facelift and entered its seventh-generation in 2017. The new generation retained the dimensions of sixth-generation and followed the Focus in being restyled, updated and with Vignale and Active versions introduced.

The Kuga had a new generation launched in early-2013 (which had a facelift in late 2016) and the small-SUV "EcoSport" was launched. Three factories closed between 2013 and 2014 amounting for 5,700 job losses, due to declining market revenue in Europe. The Southampton facility, which manufactured the Ford Transit van, and the Dagenham stamping facility in shut in mid-2013 The Genk major car plant in Belgium closed by the end of 2014 (it produced the Mondeo, the Galaxy and S-Max MPVs) models production at the plant was moved to Valencia. In late 2014, Ford launched a new-generation Mondeo (based upon the US-market's Fusion) and in 2015 new versions of the S-Max and Galaxy MPVs while the facelifted C-Max also launched.

Ford Europe, in 2016, returned to the coupe market with the US-sourced Mustang: it was sold RHD in the UK for the first time. The Edge crossover also joined the European line-up and by late 2016, 20 years after the launch of the Ka, Ford introduced the five-door hatchback Ka+, made in India it was later pulled from production after three years on sale.

== Trucks ==
The commercial vehicles arm of Ford of Britain was part of the operation until it was sold to Fiat's Iveco division in 1986. Its last significant models under Ford ownership were the Transcontinental and the Cargo.

== Tractors ==
The production of tractors in Europe by Ford ceased following the sale of the division to Fiat in 1993, and the name changed from Ford New Holland to New Holland. New Holland Agriculture is now part of CNH Industrial. Tractor production had been based at the Antwerp (now only builds drivelines) and Basildon factories.

== Facilities ==
=== Current ===
| Plant | Image | City | Country | Current products | Opened | Notes |
|---|---|---|---|---|---|---|
| Aachen Research Center | | Aachen | Germany | | | |
| Cologne Body & Assembly | | Cologne | Germany | Explorer EV, Capri EV | 1931 | |
| Craiova Assembly | | Craiova | Romania | Puma, Transit Courier / Tourneo Courier, the 1.0 L I3 EcoBoost | 2008 (Note: Year taken over by Ford of Europe. Originally opened in 1976.) | Ford transferred ownership of the factory to Turkish joint-venture Ford Otosan in 2022. |
| Dagenham Engine | | Dagenham | United Kingdom | All Ford Europe diesel engines | 1931 | |
| Dunton Technical Centre | | Dunton Wayletts | United Kingdom | | 1967 | |
| Eskişehir Assembly | | İnönü | Turkey | F-Line, F-Max, truck engines and transmissions | 1982 (Note: Year the plant was established. Joint venture established in 1977.) | A joint-venture plant of Ford Otosan. |
| Halewood Transmission | | Halewood, Merseyside | United Kingdom | Transmissions | 1963 | Originally a body and assembly plant (now gone to Jaguar Land Rover), Ford retained ownership of the transmission works. |
| Kocaeli Plants | | Gölcük, Kocaeli | Turkey | Transit, Transit Custom / Tourneo Custom | 2001 (Note: Year the plant was established. Joint venture established in 1977.) | A joint-venture plant of Ford Otosan. |
| Lommel Proving Grounds | | Lommel | Belgium | Proving grounds | 1964 | |
| Merkenich Technical/Design Centre | | Merkenich, Cologne | Germany | | 1968 | |
| Valencia Body & Assembly | | Almussafes | Spain | Kuga | 1976 | |

=== Former ===
| Plant | City | Country | Current/Last Products | Opened | Closed | Notes |
|---|---|---|---|---|---|---|
| Bordeaux Transmission Plant | Blanquefort | France | IB5 Transmissions: Fiesta, Fusion, B-MAX, Focus, C-MAX, Mondeo | 1973 | 2019 | 50/50 joint-venture between Ford and Getrag. |
| Bridgend Engine | Bridgend | United Kingdom | The 1.6 I4 EcoBoost and the SI6 (for Volvo and Land Rover) petrol engines | 1980 | 2020 | |
| Cork Assembly Plant | The Marina, Cork | (Republic of Ireland) Ireland | Sierra (1982 till 1984) Fordson (1917 to 1928) | 1917 | 1984 | First purpose-built Ford factory in Europe. Closed 1984 because it was a loss-making, even though £10m (old Irish pound) was put into the factory to make Sierras in 1982. |
| Ford Union | Apchak | Belarus | Escort, Transit | 1997 | 2000 | |
| Genk Body & Assembly | Genk | Belgium | Galaxy, Mondeo, S-Max | 1964 | 2014 | Production moved to Valencia. |
| Saarlouis Body & Assembly | Saarlouis | Germany | Focus | 1970 | 2025 | |
| Southampton Body & Assembly | Swaythling, Southampton | United Kingdom | Transit | 1953 | 2013 | Originally built as aircraft factory (Cunliffe-Owen Aircraft Ltd.) just before World War II. Production moved to Turkey. |
| Vsevolozhsk Assembly | Vsevolozhsk | Russia | Focus, Mondeo | 2002 | 2019 | |

== Models ==
=== Current model range ===
The following tables list Ford production vehicles that are sold in Europe as of 2025:

==== Passenger cars ====
| Kuga (2008–present) | Compact crossover SUV | Crossover SUV |
| Mustang (2015–present) | Pony/Muscle car | Sports Car |
| Puma (2019–present) | Subcompact crossover SUV | Crossover SUV |
| Mustang Mach-E (2021–present) | Electric compact crossover SUV | Crossover SUV |
| Bronco (2023–present) (RHD markets only) | Mid-size SUV | SUV |
| Capri EV (2024–present) | Electric Compact crossover SUV | Crossover SUV |
| Explorer EV (2024–present) | Electric Compact crossover SUV | Crossover SUV |
| Expedition (Iceland only) | Full-size SUV | SUV |

==== ST models ====
Ford produces high-performance derivatives of their cars developed by their Ford Performance division.

| Puma ST (2020–present) | Subcompact crossover SUV | Crossover SUV |

==== Light commercial vehicles ====
| Transit Courier; Tourneo Courier (2014–present) | Small panel van | 5-door panel van; 5-door leisure activity vehicle |
| Transit Connect; Tourneo Connect (A rebadged and restyled Volkswagen Caddy) (2002–present) | Compact panel van | 5-door panel van; 5-door leisure activity vehicle |
| Transit Custom; Tourneo Custom (2012–present) | Light commercial vehicle | 5-door van; 5-door crew cab van; 5-door minibus |
| Transit; Tourneo (1953–present) | Light commercial vehicle | 5-door van; 5-door crew cab van; 5-door minibus; Chassis cab |
| Ranger (1998–present) | Mid-size pick-up truck | 2-door single cab; 2-door open cab; 4-door double cab/crew cab |
| F-Series (Iceland only) | Full-size pick-up truck | 2-door regular cab; 4-door extended cab (SuperCab); 4-door crew cab (SuperCrew) |

==== Heavy commercial vehicles ====
| F-Max (2018–present) | Heavy-duty truck | Truck |

=== Discontinued models ===
- Model A (1903) (1903–1904)
  - Model A (1928) (1928–1931)
    - Model AA (1931–1932)
- Model T (1911–1927)
  - Model TT (1918–1928)
- Model B (1932–1934)
  - Model BB (1932–1934)
  - Rheinland (1933–1936)
- Model Y (1932–1937)
  - Köln (1933–1936)
  - 7Y (1938–1939)
    - Anglia (1939–1967)
      - Fordson E04C (1945–1948)
        - Fordson E494C (1948–1954)
      - Thames 307E (1961–1967)
      - Anglia Torino (1965–1967)
- Model C Ten (1934–1937)
  - CX (1935–1937)
  - Eifel (1935–1940)
  - 7W (1937–1938)
    - Prefect (1938–1961)
      - Thames 300E (1954–1961)
      - Squire (1955–1961)
- Model 48 (1935–1936)
- V8-51 (1935–1945)
- 1937 Ford (1937–1940)
  - De Luxe Ford (1937–1940)
- Thames 7V (1937–1949)
- V-3000 (1938–1948)
- E83W (1938–1957)
- 77-81 (1939–1942)
- WOT (1939–1945)
- Taunus (1939–1982)
  - Cortina (1962–1982)
  - 20 M TS (1967–1968)
- F917WS (1940–1943)
- 472A (1946–1948)
- Pilot (1947–1951)
- Vedette (1948–1954)
  - Abeille (1952–1954)
- Rhein (1948–1955)
  - Ruhr (1948–1958)
- Thames ET (1949–1957)
- Cargo (1950) (1950–1954)
- Comète (1951–1954)
- FK (1951–1961)
- Consul (1951) (1951–1962)
  - Zephyr (1951–1972)
    - Zodiac (1954–1972)
    - Executive (1966–1972)
  - Consul Classic (1961–1963)
    - Consul Capri (1962–1964)
- Vendôme (1953–1954)
- Popular (1953–1962)
- G398 (1956–1961)
- Trader (1957–1965)
- Thames 400E (1957–1965)
- E-Series (1961–2008) (Iceland only)
- GT40 (1964–1969)
- Corsair (1964–1970)
- R-Series (1964–1986)
- D-Series (1965–1981)
- Escort (1967–2002)
  - Orion (1983–1993)
- Capri (1968–1986)
- GT70 (1970–1973)
- Consul (1972) (1972–1975)
  - Granada (1972–1994)
    - Scorpio (1985–1998)
- A-Series (1973–1983)
- Transcontinental (1975–1984)
- Fiesta (1976–2023)
- LTD (1979–1980)
- Bronco (1981) (1981–1986)
- Cargo (1981–2019)
- Sierra (1982–1993)
- P100 (1982–1995)
- RS200 (1984–1986)
- Econovan (1985–1993)
- Probe (1990–1997)
- Courier (1991–2002)
- Maverick (1993) (1993–1998)
  - Maverick (2001) (2001–2007)
    - Escape (2001–2010) (Iceland only)
- Mondeo (1993–2022)
- Windstar (1995–2002)
- Galaxy (1995–2023)
- Explorer (1995–2001; 2019–2024) (To be replaced by Explorer EV in 2024)
- Ka (1996–2021)
- Puma (1997) (1997–2002)
- Cougar (1998–2002)
- Focus (1998–2025)
  - Focus ST (2005–2025)
- TH!NK (1999–2006)
- Excursion (2000–2005) (Iceland only)
- Explorer Sport Trac (2000–2010) (Iceland only)
- Fusion (2002–2012)
- Freestar (2003–2006) (Netherlands only)
- C-Max (2003–2019)
  - Grand C-Max (2011–2019)
- GT (2005) (2005–2006)
  - GT (2018) (2018–2022)
- Freestyle (2005–2007) (Iceland only)
- S-Max (2006–2023)
- Edge (2007–2021)
- B-Max (2012–2017)
- EcoSport (2014–2023)

=== European Car of the Year ===
Ford has produced five winners of the European Car of the Year competition:

- 1981 – Ford Escort
- 1986 – Ford Scorpio/Granada
- 1994 – Ford Mondeo
- 1999 – Ford Focus
- 2007 – Ford S-Max

==== Shortlisted models ====
Several models have been shortlisted, including the:

- 1976 – Ford Fiesta
- 1978 – Ford Granada
- 1983 – Ford Sierra
- 1989 – Ford Fiesta
- 1997 – Ford Ka
- 2001 – Ford Mondeo
- 2007 – Ford Focus
- 2008 – Ford Mondeo
- 2009 – Ford Fiesta
- 2012 – Ford Focus

== See also ==
- Merkur
- Carrozzeria Ghia
- Vignale
- Ford Team RS
- Ford Sollers
- Cosworth
- List of automobile manufacturers of Germany
