= Thames (commercial vehicles) =

Subsidiary of Ford Motor Company

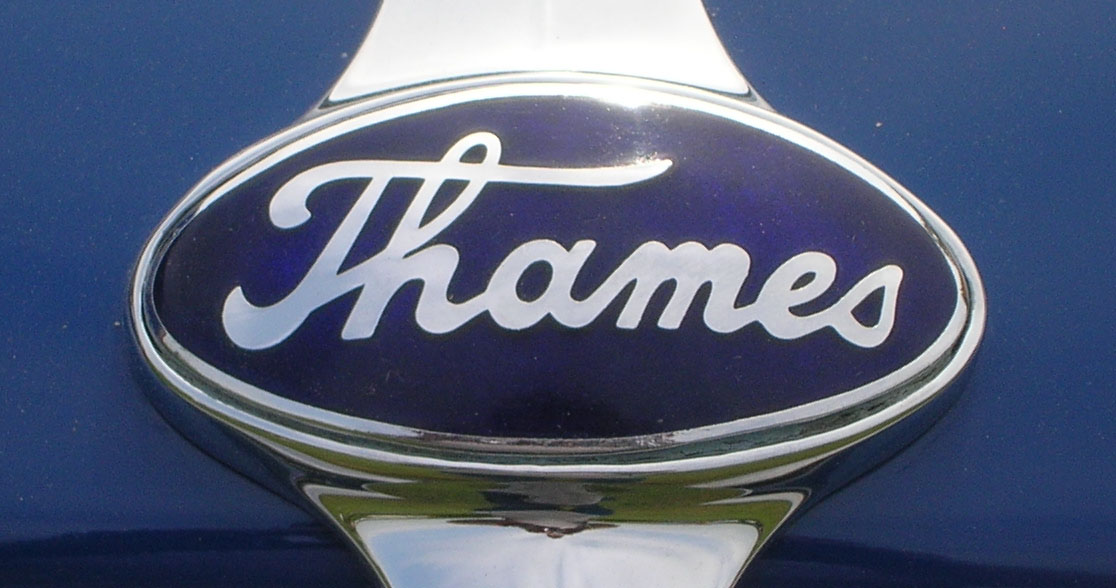
- One variant of the Thames logo

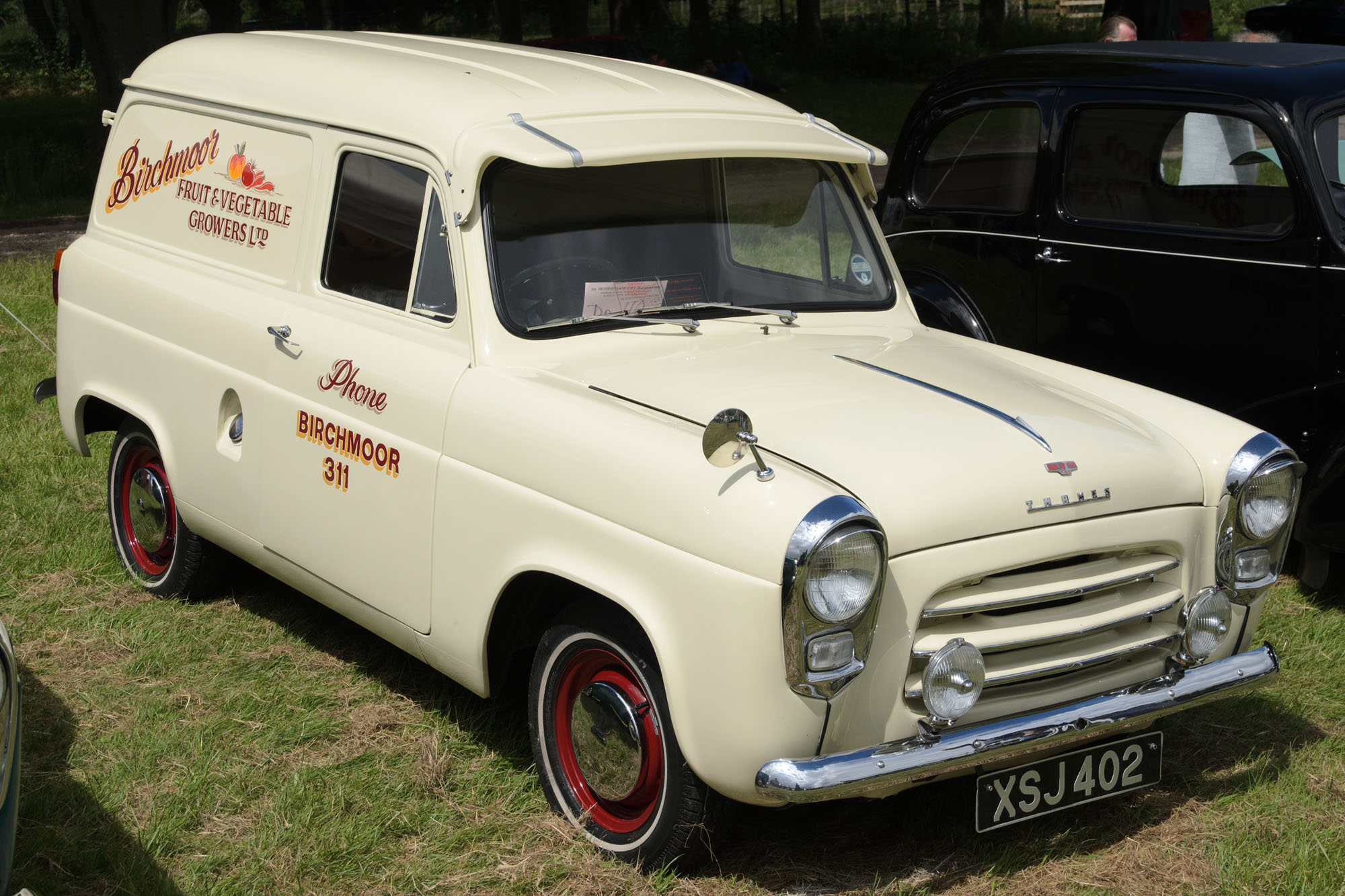
- Ford Thames 300E Van (1958)
- Product type: Commercial vehicles (vans and trucks)
- Current owner: Ford
- Produced by: Ford of Britain
- Country: United Kingdom, Europe and Canada
- Introduced: 1939
- Discontinued: 1965
- Related brands: Fordson

Thames (also known as Ford Thames or Fordson Thames) was a commercial vehicle brand produced by Ford of Britain.

== History ==
The Thames name first appeared in 1939 as the Fordson Thames. Ford of Britain wanted to make a British brand identity and differentiate its passenger and commercial lines. Subsequently, the Thames name became widely used. The name Thames was initially used alongside Fordson on commercial products until 1957 when the Fordson name was removed from all trucks and the brand was focused only on farm products such as tractors. In 1965 Ford dropped the Thames name and all commercial vehicles and trucks were now marketed under the Ford name.

== Vehicles ==
=== Fordson E83W ===
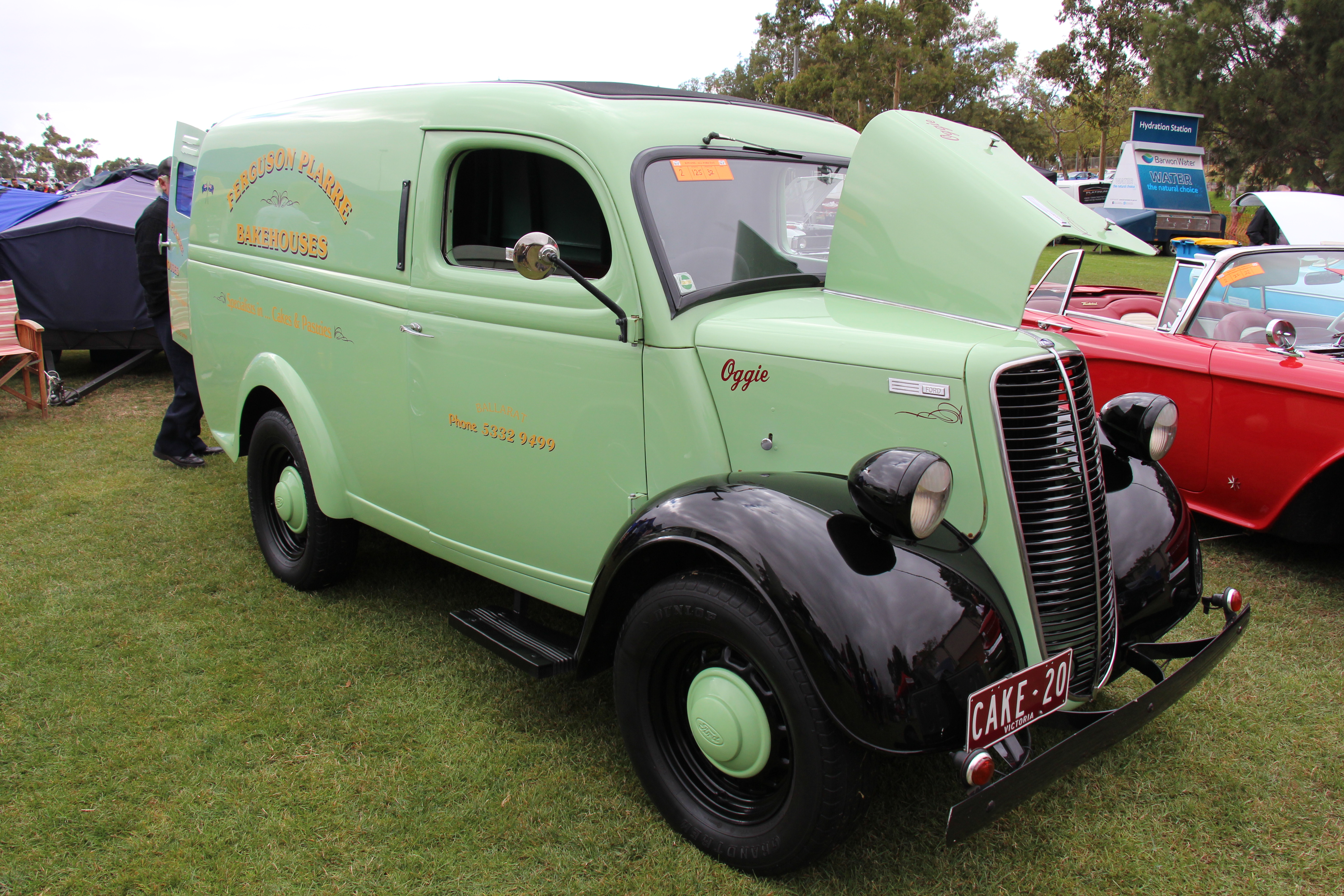
1948 Ford E83W van

The Fordson E83W was the brand's light commercial van offering, being offered on the 10 cwt (1,100 lb; 510 kg) segment. It was built at Ford's Dagenham plant where the brand's tractors were also being produced. The E83W range was offered as a van, pickup truck and many special bodyshops produced various other bodies upon the chassis, such as mobile canteens, fire trucks and ice cream vans.

The Fordson E83W pre-dated the name Thames. It was produced between 1938 and 1957. The van was sold in Australia as the Ford Ten-Ten, and the E83W was available in various forms around much of the world as Britain strove to export after World War II. In some countries, the 'cowl and chassis' only was imported and local bodies built.

The E83W range was powered by Ford's sidevalve engine which produced 30 hp with a 3-speed gearbox, and was heavily geared down in the rear axle. This made the van much slower than a contemporary saloon with an effective top speed of not much over 40-50 mph. The E83W had a mostly unique body and shared few parts with other small Fords, although some parts were based on the larger Ford Pilot while the headlamps came from Fordson tractors. Since 1952 the van was also sold under the Thames brand.

=== Fordson 7V ===
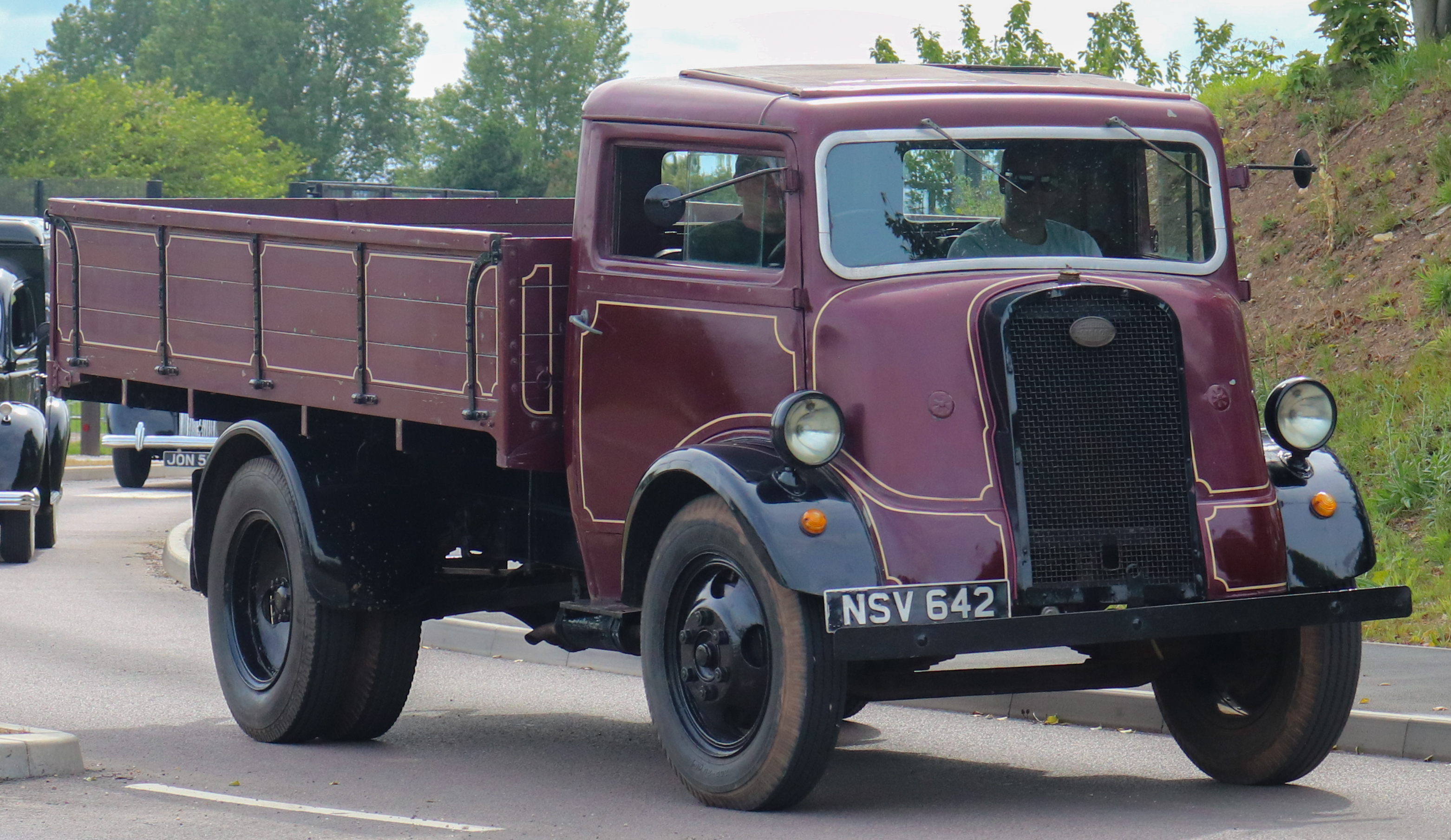
1943 Fordson Thames 7V

The Fordson 7V or Fordson Thames 7V, depending on the dealer network, was a medium/heavy-duty commercial truck range. it was first introduced in 1937 as the successor to the Ford Model BB (while still being based around the same chassis and mechanicals). Available with a payload of up to 5 tonnes, the then very modern truck in cab-over-engine design enabled greater manoeuvrability in urban environments. Two different wheelbases were available, and the chassis provided the basis for various bodies. For example, the Fordson Thames 7V was the most widely used fire truck during the Second World War. The model series was powered by the well-known V8 Ford Flathead side-valve engine with 85 hp. By means of a three-speed (optional four-speed) manual transmission and cardan shaft, the drive was made to the rear wheels. For that time, the one-piece windscreen, which could be opened for ventilation, and a sunroof above the passenger seat stood out.

Early 7Vs built in 1937 and 1938 had a curved rounded grille, while from the 7Vs built in 1939 it stood flat and was smaller as were the headlights. These measures were consequences of the beginning of the war and the associated shortage of raw materials. The production of the civilian 7Vs was maintained throughout the war. An armored version was also produced for use by the army. During World War II, civilian production was halted for military vehicles, in 1945 civilian production resumed.

Immediately after the end of the war, numerous improvements were introduced, the most outstanding of which were a new braking system and a tractor unit. A 4.7-liter Perkins Engines inline six-cylinder diesel engine with 45 hp was available as an option from 1948. Until mid-1949, the model series was produced in Dagenham and replaced by the Fordson Thames ET. One disadvantage of the 7V range was its somewhat cramped cab, something that its successor greatly improved upon.

=== Fordson Thames ET ===
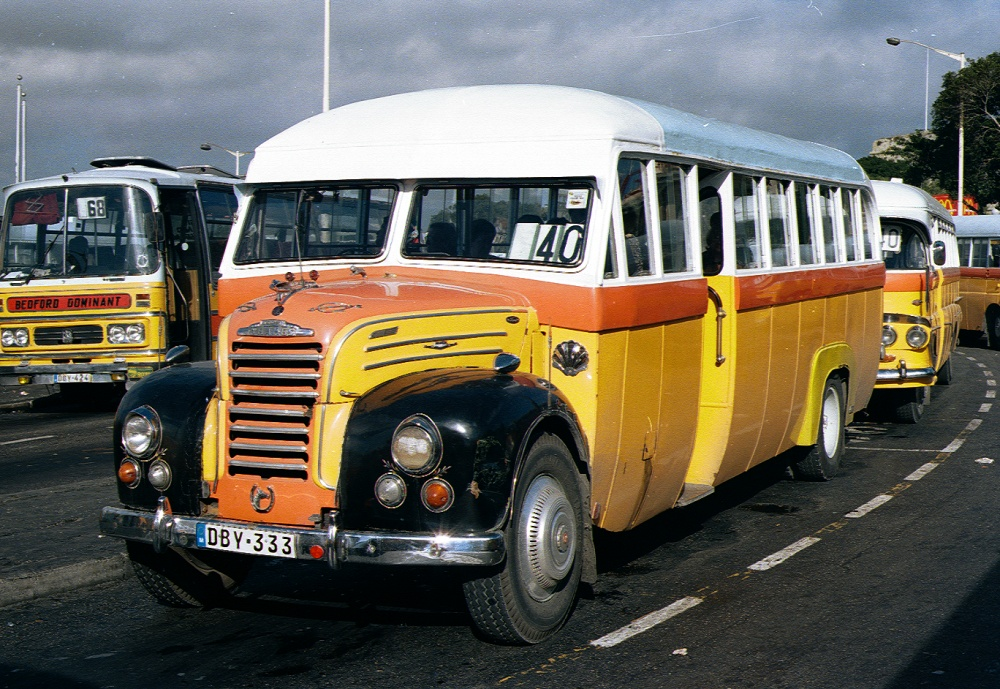
Fordson Thames ET bus in Malta

In 1949, Ford of Britain presented its new post-war truck range, this time under the Fordson Thames brand only (instead of offering a vehicle by both brands separately), replacing the previous Fordson 7V models while still retaining the same chassis and Ford V8 flathead engine. ET stood for English Truck. In addition to the Commonwealth of Nations, it was also offered in continental Europe, but not in Germany (where it was seen as unnecessary as the similar Rhein and Ruhr models were sold there). The model series was available not only as a truck and chassis, but also as a panel van and bus.

A version with a Perkins engine was also offered. The conventional cab with a hood muzzle and split windscreen had more space than its predecessor. It was built by coachbuilder Briggs Motor Bodies and was supplied in almost the same form for the Dodge 100 and the Leyland Comet. The chassis had semi-elliptical leaf springs and now hydraulically operated brakes with vacuum brake booster. Payloads of up to eight tons and optional all-wheel drive were now also possible.

A four-wheel drive 3-ton variant (ETF6) with the Canadian V8 engine with vertical valves and a cab-over-engine cab from British Light Steel Pressings was also built. This was also used by Commer.

Because of the high fuel consumption of the outdated V8 engine, Ford launched the newly developed "Cost Cutter" in 1953 for payload variants up to three tons, a 3.6-liter four-cylinder engine with overhead valves. This engine was also the basis for Ford's first self-developed diesel engine with 3.61 liters of displacement and 70 hp (55 kW) of power. This was offered from 1954 as 4D or 6D. Production in Dagenham ended in 1957 and its successor was the Ford Thames Trader. Ebro built the Fordson-Thames ET models under license from 1956 to 1963 as the Ebro B series.

=== Ford Thames Trader ===
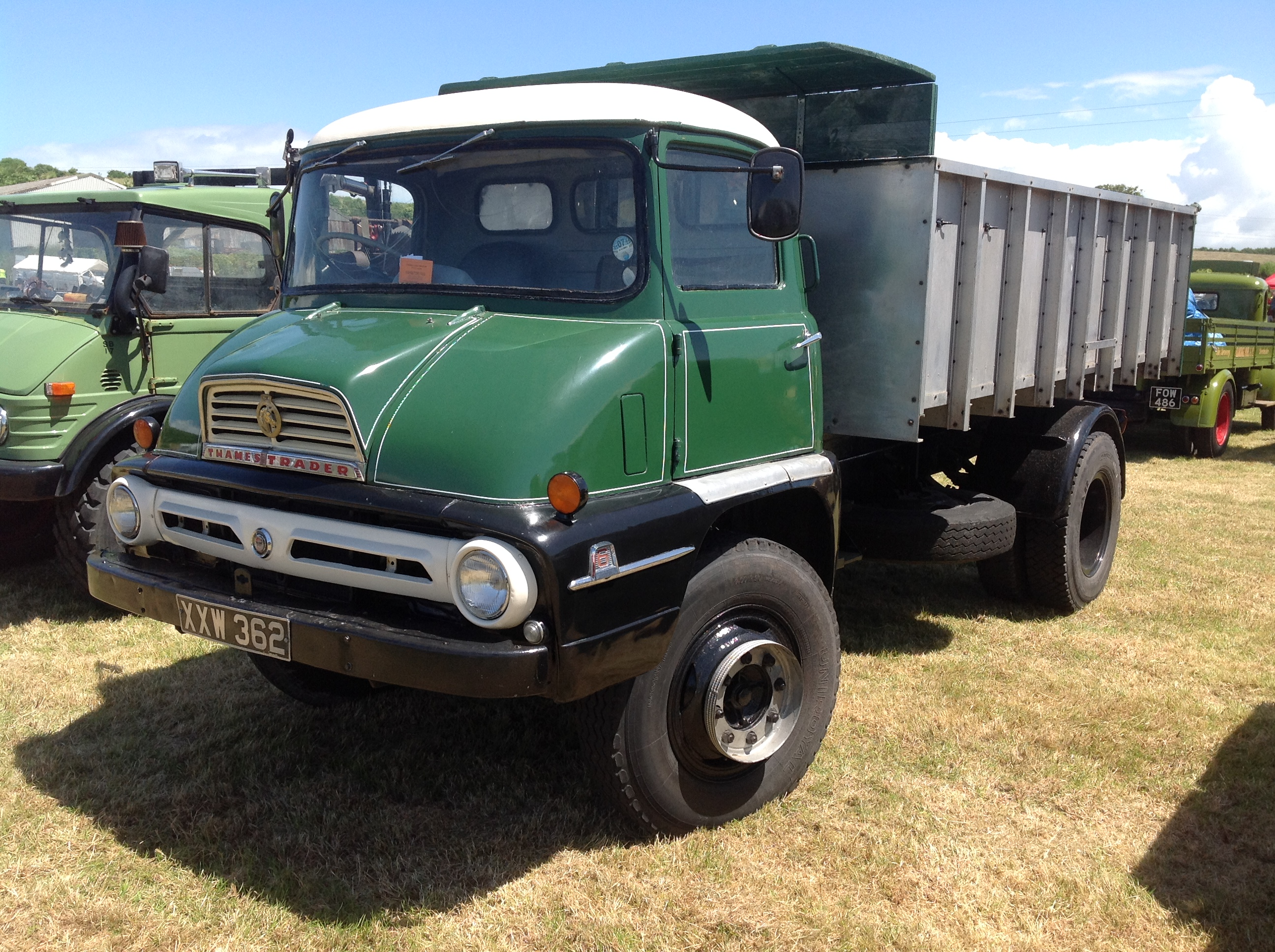
1959 Ford Thames Trader

The Thames Trader was presented in 1957 as the successor to the Fordson Thames ET range. It shared almost nothing with its predecessor and was a completely new model, although it still shared some styling with the contemporary 1950s Ford F-Series model line. It was offered all around Europe except for Germany (like its predecessor) because the mechanically similar Ford FK range was sold there and it was feared that offering both model lines would cause in-house competition between the models. The Trader was also exported to South Africa, Malta, Morocco, Indonesia and Australia. From 1963, the Trader was also produced by Ebro in Spain as Ebro C-400, C-500 and C-550. Also from 1963, production began at Otosan in Turkey and at the Ford plant in Rhodesia – Egypt. Additionally, like its predecessors, some vehicles were also exported to Canada but did not find much success there because Ford was also offering its more popular American products there and the British vehicles were quickly withdrawn from the market. Overall, the Trader was replaced by the Ford D series range as Ford removed the Thames name from its products.

Additionally, a normal control version using the cab of the discontinued Ford FK range was also offered under the NC designation and was later renamed the K series.

It was available at up to 7 tons as a rigid truck and 13.4 tons as a tractor. At that time Ford had Thames rigid models from 1.5 to 7 tons. In 1962 The Trader II was introduced, available as a 7.5 tons rigid and 17 tons tractor.

Production of all variants ended in 1965.

=== Ford Thames 300E ===
A light car derived van based on the Ford Anglia / Prefect 100E saloon range. It shared its bodyshell and 1172 cc sidevalve four-cylinder engine with the Ford Squire estate car versions of the line. It was available as a 5 cwt version and a deluxe model alongside a 7 cwt one was also offered. All three offered the same 66-cubic-foot (1.9 m3) load volume. Production totalled 196,885 examples comprising 139,267 5 cwt, 10,056 Standard 7 cwt and 47,562 Deluxe 7 cwt units.

=== Ford Thames 307E ===
Similar to the 300E, it was a small car-derived van based on the recently introduced Ford Anglia 105E. it was marketed again as the Thames 5 cwt or the Thames 7 cwt van. These names defined, in Imperial measurements, the recommended maximum load weights (approximately equivalent to 250 and 350 kg respectively) of the vehicles. Advertised load space was 73 cubic feet (2,100 L) including 12 cubic feet (340 L) beside the driver. From October 1962 the 5cwt and 7cwt vans were also offered with the 1198cc engine from the Ford Anglia Super and these were designated as Thames 309E. In March 1965 the use of the Thames name was discontinued and from that time Anglia-based vans were marketed as Ford Anglia Vans.

Production ended in 1967 with over 200,000 having been produced by then.

== International variants ==
=== Matford F917WS ===
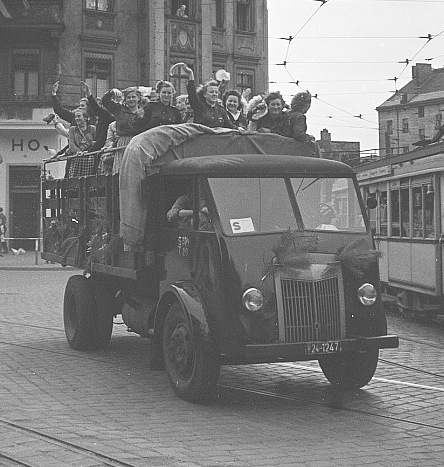
Matford F11W or similar

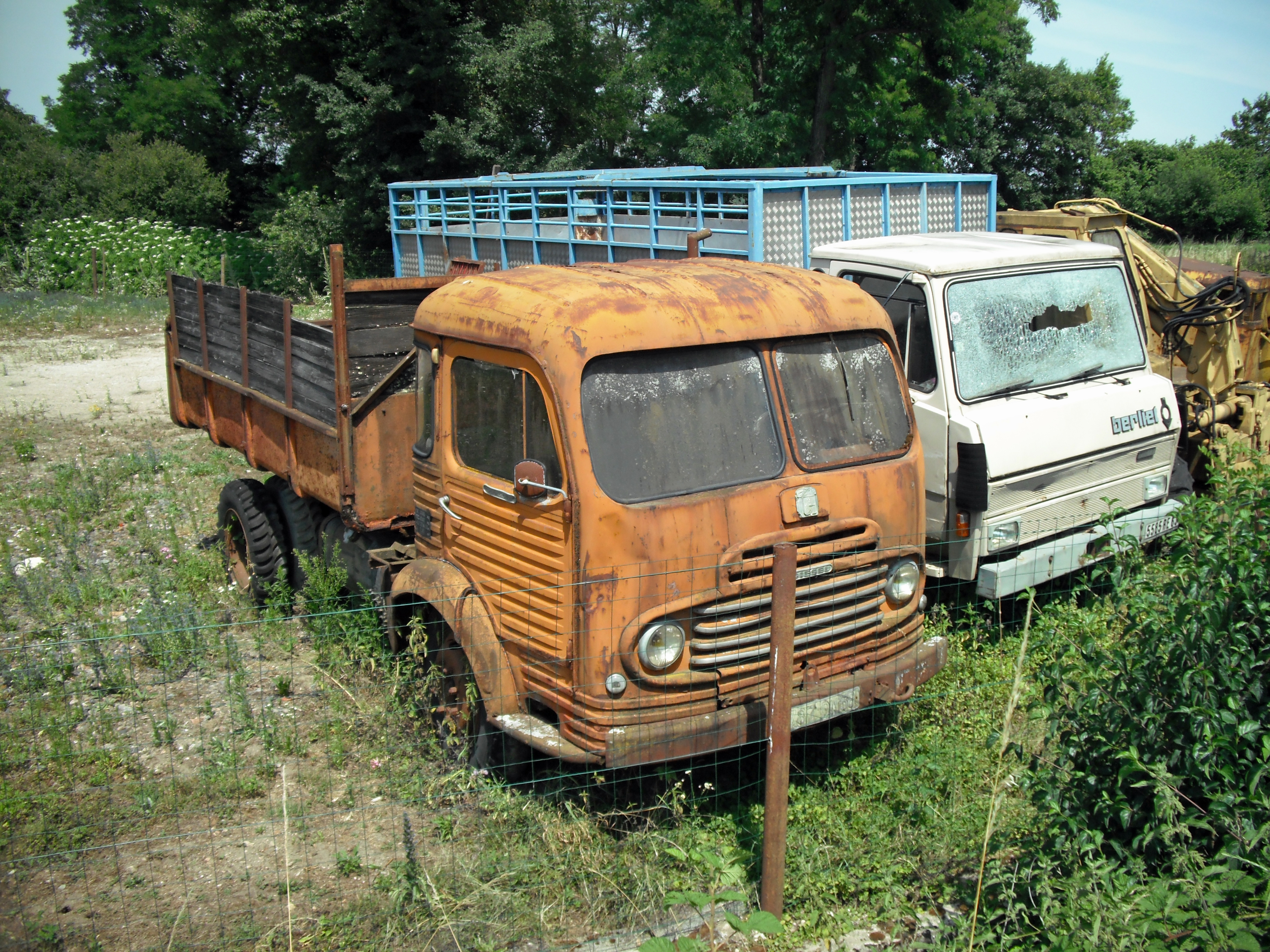
Ford SAF Cargo

A copy of the Fordson 7V was produced in France by Ford's local subsidiary and partner Matford as the F917WS model in their Poissy factory. It was mainly designed for the French army in the outbreak of World War 2 but only around 600 were delivered to the army before France was seized by Nazi Germany. The Nazis used a number of these trucks, but sabotages made by the French workers who were not fond of their ideals led to production ending the following months and the army using only German Ford trucks while the Poissy plant only delivered parts to Germany to keep production running. After the war, the truck was heavily modernized both mechanically and stylistically and was relaunched as the Ford Cargo F798WM (not to be confused with the later Ford Cargo range). This time, the Ford V8 was extensively reworked for the vehicle with the help from Hispano-Suiza. Apart from its home market, it also saw some export sales.

In 1951, the French Ministry of Defense placed a major order for 2000 diesel engine trucks with 6x6 all-wheel drive. However, such a model hat yet to be developed. As a temporary solution, Ford delivered 560 trucks with gasoline engines. From 1951, a tractor unit with the diesel engine was also available. Because of the austerity plans in 1952, the government withdrew its order and Ford France boss Lehideux immediately dismissed several hundred workers. As early as 1950, there had been repeated violent strikes at the Poissy plant. These strikes and low sales led Ford to look for a buyer for the plant. On July 4, 1954, Simca took over most of Ford France and thus also the Poissy plant. Until 1958, Ford still held 18% of the shares. At the end of 1954, sales of the Ford Cargo F798WM were discontinued. Nevertheless, a version for the French military continued in production under the Simca and later Unic brands in the company's plant in Suresnes. The engines were now supplied by Bugatti although they were still being based on the Ford V8 design. During all of production, more economical 4- and 6-cylinder engines were also available. Since 1953, the engine of the Cargo was also used in the Ford Vendôme luxury car.

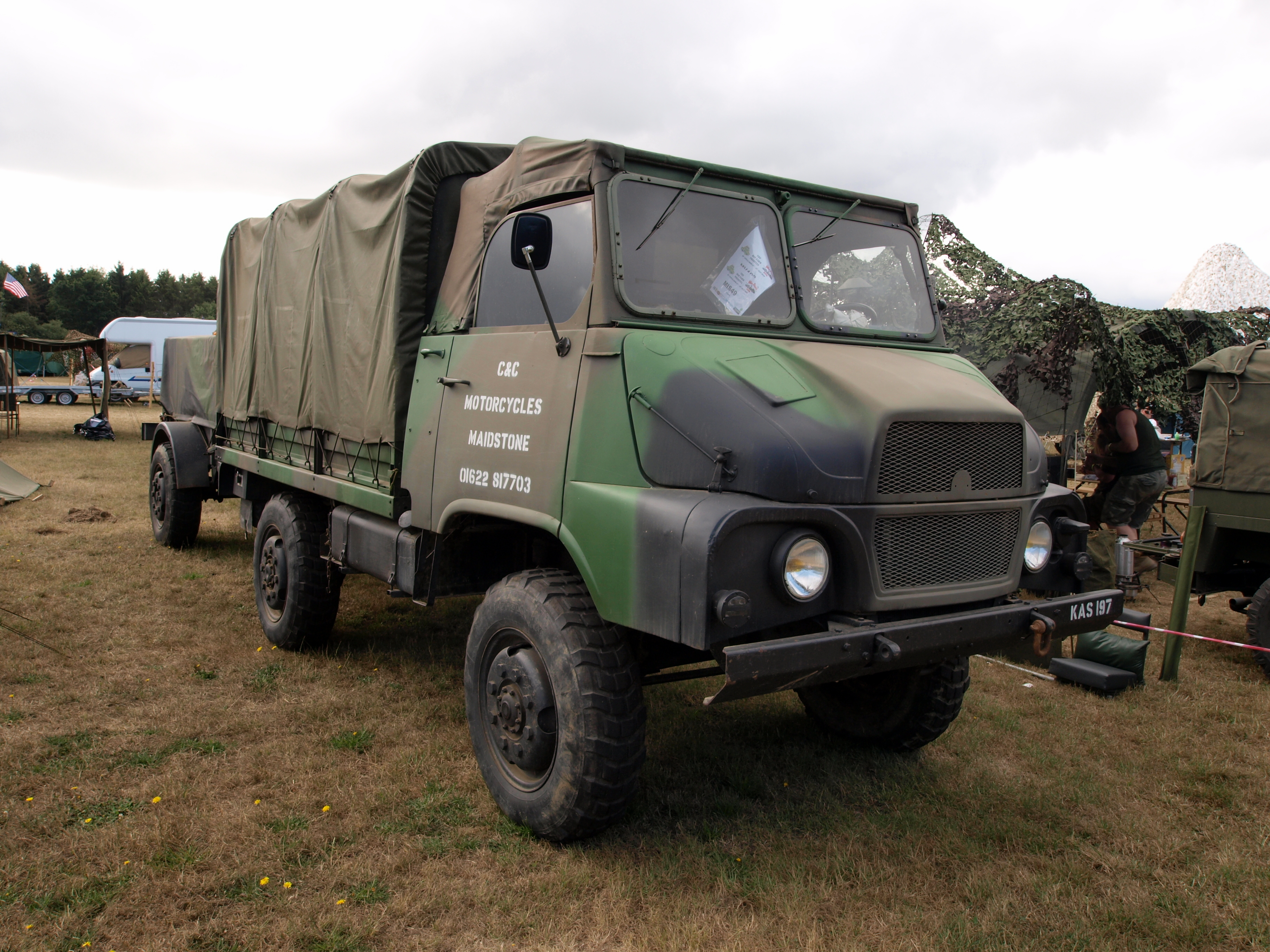
Simca SUMB

Since the French army was looking for a small off-road truck in the style of the Unimog and no French automobile company had such a vehicle in its product range, the Simca SUMB was developed. The Simca SUMB shared the same transmission and engine as the by-now called Unic Cargo but had a new cab and slightly shorter chassis which was provided by Unic, while the axles came from Marmon-Herrington; the body was styled by local company Bocquet. Therefore, SUMB stands for Simca Unic Marmon Boquet.

The SUMB came into many versions for the military, many including various special bodies, allowing for payloads up to 2 tons. Over 6,000 were produced and delivered to the French army before production ended in 1973. The tooling was sold to Renault which however did not procced further with the design, instead providing their own Saviem TP3 to the army as the successor. After 1994–1995, a number of SUMB vehicles were converted to use Renault engines as the outdated Ford design was very much uneconomical by now. Since 2005, SUMB vehicles started getting retired from military service and sold as surplus products.

Iveco went on to purchase Unic, and produced an off-road-oriented version of its Iveco Daily van which was named the Iveco Daily 4x4. This was marketed in France under the Unic brand, effectively filling the gap left by the Simca/Unic SUMB by one of their own models.

== Further fate ==
After the Thames name was retired, Ford continued building commercial vehicles in Europe but only under its own brand name. By the 1980s, Ford was still very successful on the segment and offered the Escort Van, Transit and Cargo alongside the P100, Courier and Transcontinental models. However, during the 1990s Ford started facing major problems on the medium-duty segment and was forced to sell its Langley truck plant to Iveco who managed to establish more themselves on the British market by also offering the Daily and Eurocargo models under the Ford brand alongside the original Iveco models, effectively expanding their network dealer.

== Models ==
- Fordson Thames E83W – a 10 cwt light lorry built between 1938 and 1957.
- Fordson Thames ET – introduced in 1949.
- Fordson (1954 to 1956) then Ford (1957 to 1961) Thames 300E – a 5 or 7 cwt car derived van built between 1954 and 1961.
- Ford Thames 307E – a small panel van introduced in June 1961.
- Ford Thames 400E – a 10, 12, or 15 cwt range built between 1957 and September 1965.
- Ford Thames Trader – a 2 to 7.5 tons rigid range and up to 17 tons as a tractor built between 1957 and 1965.

== See also ==
- Ford Transit
