= Stuart Rowley =

Engineer

Stuart Rowley (born 12 May 1967) is a British engineer, and was the head of Ford of Europe between April 2019 and December 2022.

== Early life ==
He was born in Derbyshire. He grew up in a Staffordshire village. He studied Mineral Engineering at the University of Leeds.

== Career ==
=== Ford ===
He joined Ford of Britain in 1990.

== Personal life ==
He is married with two sons.
