= Ford A series =

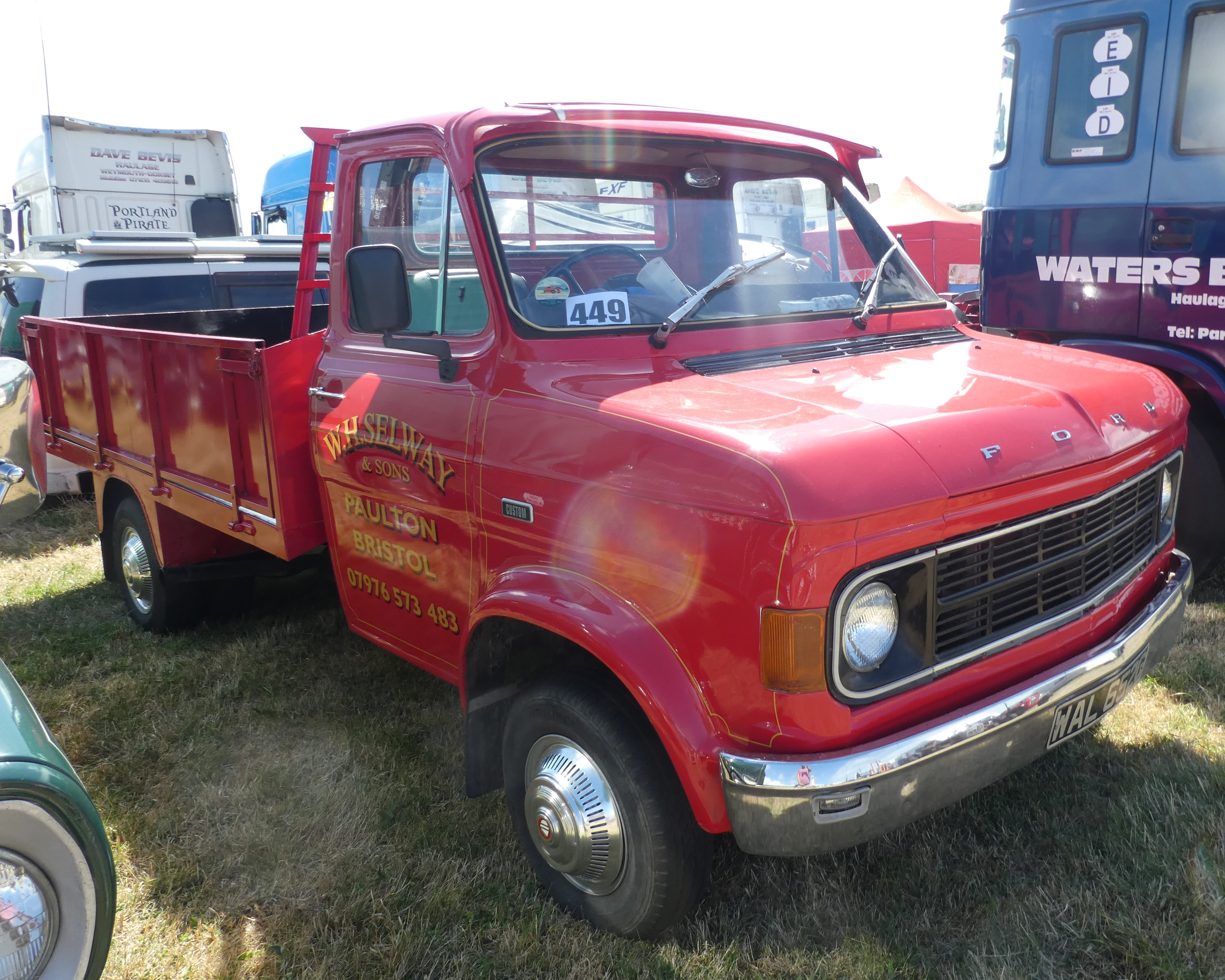

Overview
- Manufacturer: Ford UK
- Production: 1973–1983

Body and chassis
- Class: Light commercial vehicle (M)
- Related: Ford Transit

Powertrain
- Engine: 2.0L Ford Taunus V4; 2.4L Ford York engine I4; 3.5L Ford York engine I6; 3.0L Ford Essex V6
- Transmission: 4 speed manual (Ford and Turner); 5 speed manual (ZF)

Chronology
- Predecessor: Ford K-Series
- Successor: Iveco-Ford Daily; Ford Transit III LWB V6; Ford Cargo

The Ford A series is a range of light trucks built by Ford UK during the 1970s and 1980s in their Langley plant in Berkshire. Ford had identified a gap in the market for vehicles of between 3.5 tons Gross Vehicle Weight (GVW) and 5.5 tons GVW and marketed the A Series as 'Ford's Go-Between'. The vehicles bridged the gap between the relatively small Transit and the bigger D series. By the time it finished production in 1983 Ford could report that whilst the A Series had sold relatively well in France and West Germany (as indeed had been the intention), it had always sold in smaller numbers in Britain and was no longer regarded as a viable project.. At the time, Ford also pointed to the need for tachographs in vehicles over 3.5 tonnes having deterred some A Series customers. It is also possibly the case that Ford had found the A Series' competition increasingly successful, notably the Mercedes-Benz T2 and Chrysler's Dodge 50.

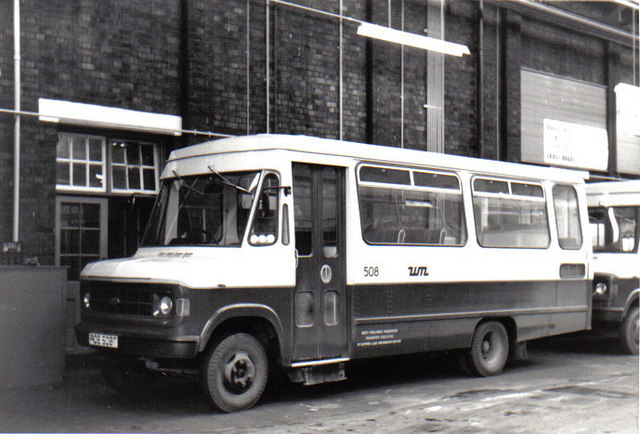
Ford A series bus

In 1967, Ford made the decision to carry out a thorough investigation of the sector of 3.5 to 6.3 ton GVW trucks. The decision to introduce the range was made in 1970 and development began in early 1971. Is public debut came at the 1973 Frankfurt Motor Show. Some 20 vehicles running over 500,000 miles were used during the three-year, 12 million-pound proving and development programme.

The A series went on sale in the UK on September 13, 1973. Over 350 basic variants were built, allowing for variances of wheelbase, gross weight, engine and body types, and also for LHD and RHD. Even an articulated tractor or "baby" artic, the AA0709 with a GCW of 6600 kg was available, in RHD form only. The A Series cab shared a number of panels and other components with the Transit, the most notable differences being the longer and wider wings, longer bonnet and a different grille. However, the primary difference between the two was the chassis, monocoque construction not being available on the A Series. Unlike the Transit that had a facelift in 1977/1978, the A Series retained its profile for the entire period of production.

The A series could be divided into two categories:

- The smaller A04xx with 14-inch wheels, 6x170 mm bolt pattern, and four-cylinder engines.
- The bigger A05xx / A06xx with 16-inch wheels, 6×205 mm bolt pattern, stronger frame and six-cylinder engines.
- A 4x4 version was also offered by Reynolds Boughton and was intended for various special applications.

Four engines were offered: a 2.4 litre 4-cylinder diesel; a 3.5 litre 6-cylinder diesel (actually a 2.4 with 2 more cylinders); a 2 litre V4 petrol and a 3.0 litre V6 petrol. Three transmissions were offered: Ford's 4-speed 4-310 synchro only on 2-3-4, Turner's 4 spd T4-150 1-2-3-4 synchro, and the ZF 5 spd S5-24/3 1-2-3-4-5 synchro offered as a high capacity unit. 3 driving axles were offered: The versions with 14-inch wheels had a slightly modified 50-series axle (Ford type 24) similar to the Transit. Ratios 4.625 and 5.125 Single 16 in wheel models had a Salisbury Engineering 8HA/Dana 60 (Ford type 27). Ratios 4.88 to 6.17. Dual 16 in wheel models had a Salisbury Engineering 10HA/Dana 70HD (Ford type 42). Ratios 4.88 to 7.17. Four wheelbases were offered: 120, 130, 145 and 156 inches (3.05, 3.3, 3.68 and 3.96 m).

G & T Fire Control Ltd of Gravesend offered a fire appliance version, the Attack, based on the 6-ton chassis. This was launched in early 1976 and utilised Ford's Essex 3-litre petrol engine mated to a five-speed ZF gearbox. The fire pump was a Godiva UMP MK50 driven by a Chelsea power take off.

Production ended in July 1983. The market originally targeted by the A series range was eventually catered for by rebadged versions of the Iveco Daily which Ford now sold, the heavier versions of the new Ford Transit when it arrived in 1986 and the lightest version of the Ford Cargo, a 6-tonne rigid example of which had been introduced in 1981.
