= Ford FK =

Ford FK/Ford Köln
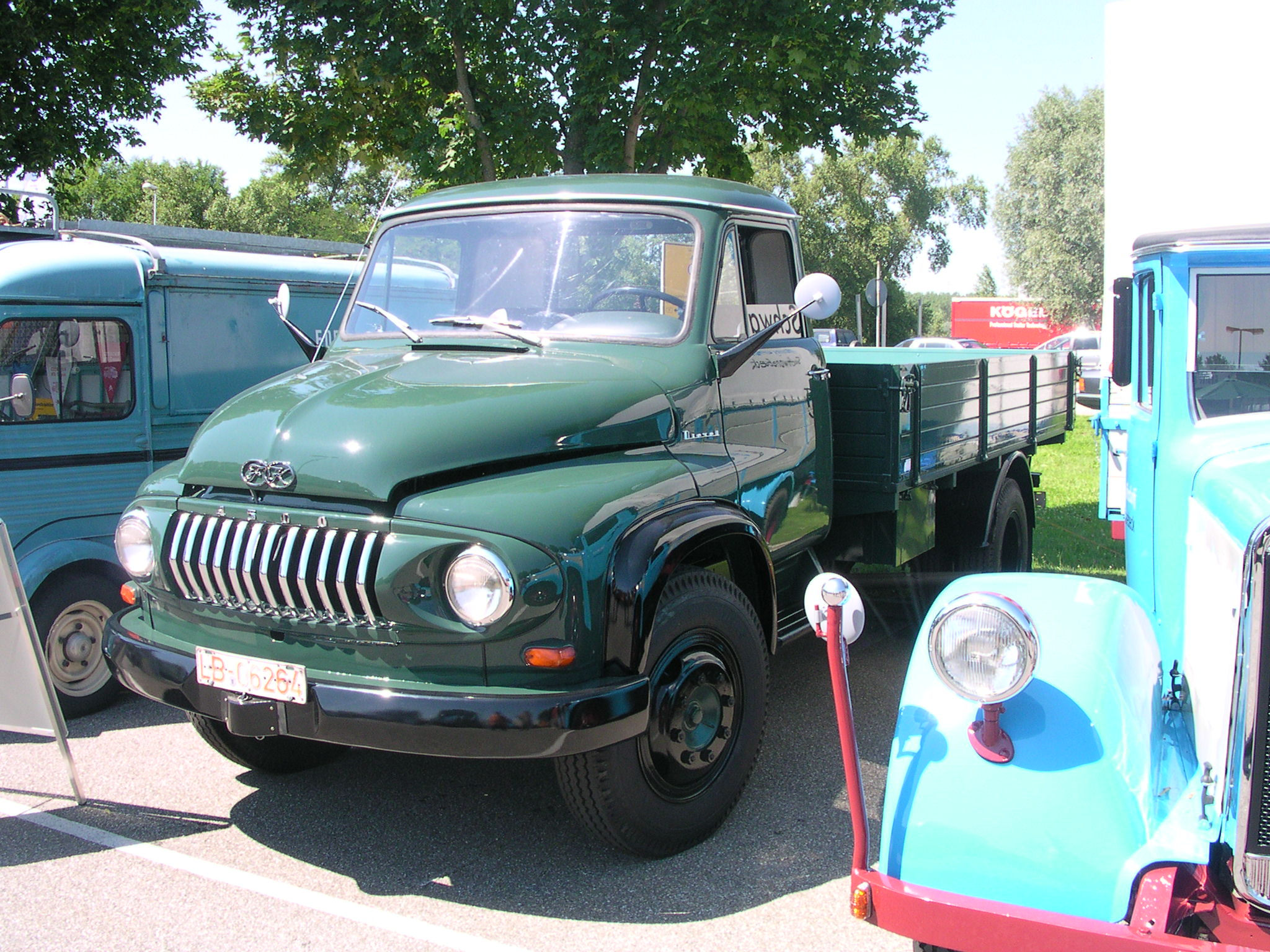
- 1957 Ford FK 4500 "Haifisch"

Overview
- Manufacturer: Ford Germany
- Production: 1951–1961
- Assembly: Cologne, Germany; São Paulo, Brazil (CKD)

Body and chassis
- Body style: Conventional

Chronology
- Predecessor: Ford Rhein; Ford Ruhr
- Successor: Ford K-Series; Ford D-series; Ford Transcontinental

The Ford FK, short for "Ford Köln," is a series of medium-duty trucks built by Ford of Germany in their Cologne (Köln) plant in two generations from 1951 until 1961. The Ford "Köln" name replaced the earlier Rhein and Ruhr badges as competitor Krupp (Südwerke) had quietly copyrighted them. Ford Germany withdrew from the truck sector after 1961, focusing on lighter utility vehicles and imports from Ford UK.

== First generation ==
The first Ford FK series arrived in 1951, in three weight models: the 2-tonne (4,400 lb) FK 2000 with a 3.3 liter four-cylinder G28T petrol engine with 52 PS (38 kW); the 3-tonne (6,600 lb) FK 3000 with a 57 PS (42 kW) version of the same; and the 3 1/2-tonne (7,700 lb) FK 3500 with the 52 PS (38 kW) G29T petrol V8 engine (this engine gained five horsepower in 1952). The FK's headlights were integrated in the fenders and the prominent grille consisted of seven horizontal chromed strips. The earlier, smaller Ford Rhein-series of trucks had been built with a petrol V8 engine, but as it was not very economical Ford decided to install a diesel engine. The choice fell on a 94 PS (69 kW) 4,080 cc (249.0 cu in) unit from American engine manufacturer Hercules; the engine was built under license for Ford by Knorr in Munich with a Bosch fuel injection system. This was installed in the Rhein series, but also in the 3 1/2-tonne (7,700 lb) FK 3500D and the larger displacement, 4-tonne (8,800 lb) FK 4000 which arrived in 1953. Reliability concerns prompted Ford to quickly detune the diesel to 85 PS (63 kW).

In 1953, the underpowered four-cylinder engines, carried over from the 1932 Ford BB and developed from the 1927 Model A's engine, were discontinued. In June 1954 the FK 4000 S/D arrived, this had a 4,460 cc (272.2 cu in) version of the Hercules diesel with 90 PS (66 kW). The comparatively high-revving, low-compression Hercules diesels had a very bad reputation for quality and served to hurt Ford's reputation in the truck market. At this time the Ford Köln also received a redesigned cabin, with a square, chromed grille, a split windshield, and a shorter bonnet. The shorter cab allowed for a longer cargo space with better weight distribution.

Forward control versions were also offered to market, but only a small number of units were actually sold.

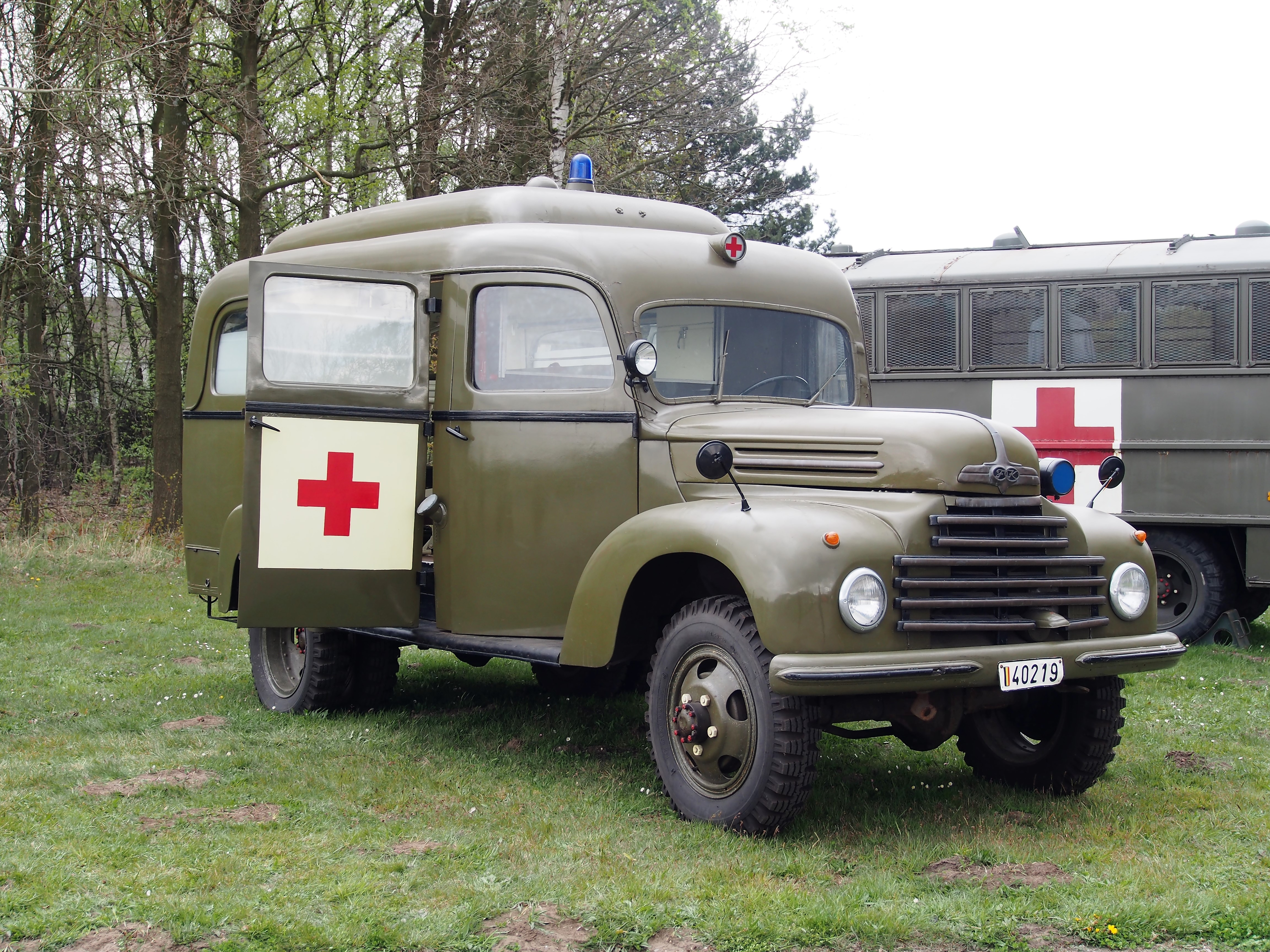
Ca. 1954 Ford FK3500 ambulance

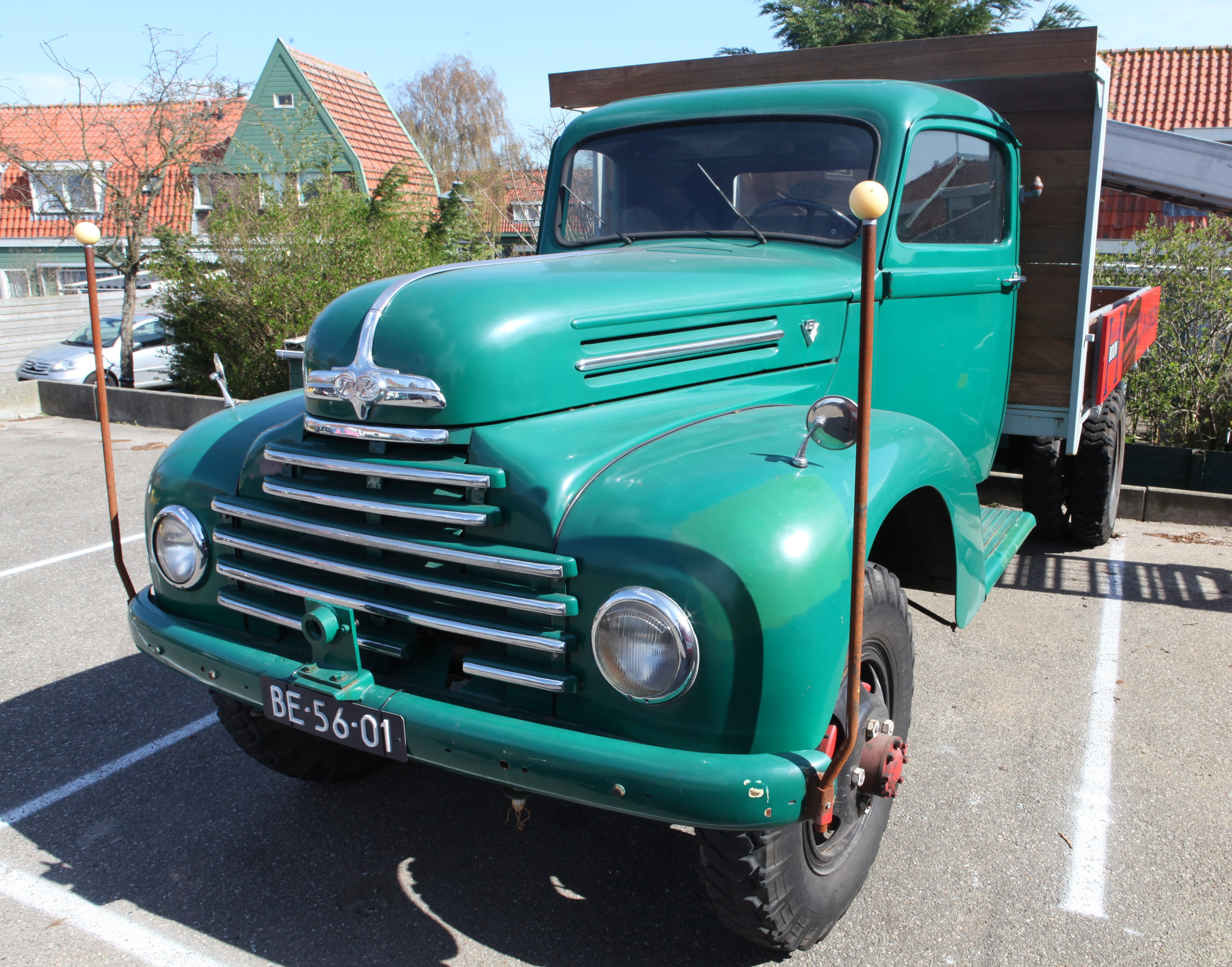
1956 Ford G398 TA (four-wheel-drive export model intended for military use)

== Second generation ==
The second generation of FKs was introduced at the very end of 1955 and were nicknamed Haifisch ("Shark") due to their toothy grilles. The shape was much modern, with a one-piece, curved windshield, a rounded nose, and a grille with twelve vertical, chromed elements. The range included three main models: the 2.5 tonnes (5,500 lb) FK 2500, the 3.5 tonnes (7,700 lb) FK 3500, and the 4.5 tonnes (9,900 lb) FK 4500. The FK has a ladder frame chassis with leaf sprung live axles front and rear and hydraulic brakes on all four wheels. Four- or five-speed transmissions were available. While petrol models retained the earlier 3.9-liter V8 with 100 PS (73.5 kW), the diesel engines were entirely new: they were two-stroke diesels in either V4 or V6 formats, of 2.8 or 4.2 liters. Maximum power claims were 80 and 120 PS (59 and 88 kW), respectively.

The two-stroke design, developed by Professor Hans List of Graz, Austria for his company AVL, was chosen as it was believed that its minimum number of moving parts would provide both reliability and economy. However, reality proved otherwise. The cylinders deformed around the exhaust ports, and engine failures were rife. In the first half of 1956, warranty claims outnumbered new truck deliveries. Production of new engines was repeatedly halted in order to be able to carry out rebuilds. By the middle of 1957 the diesels were discontinued, leaving only the petrol V8 to soldier on until 1961. The disastrous experience is generally credited with ending Ford Germany's involvement with trucks. The pressing tools for the cabin were transferred to Ford UK in 1962, who used them for the Thames Trader NC, later sold as the Ford K-series.
