= Ford Ruhr =

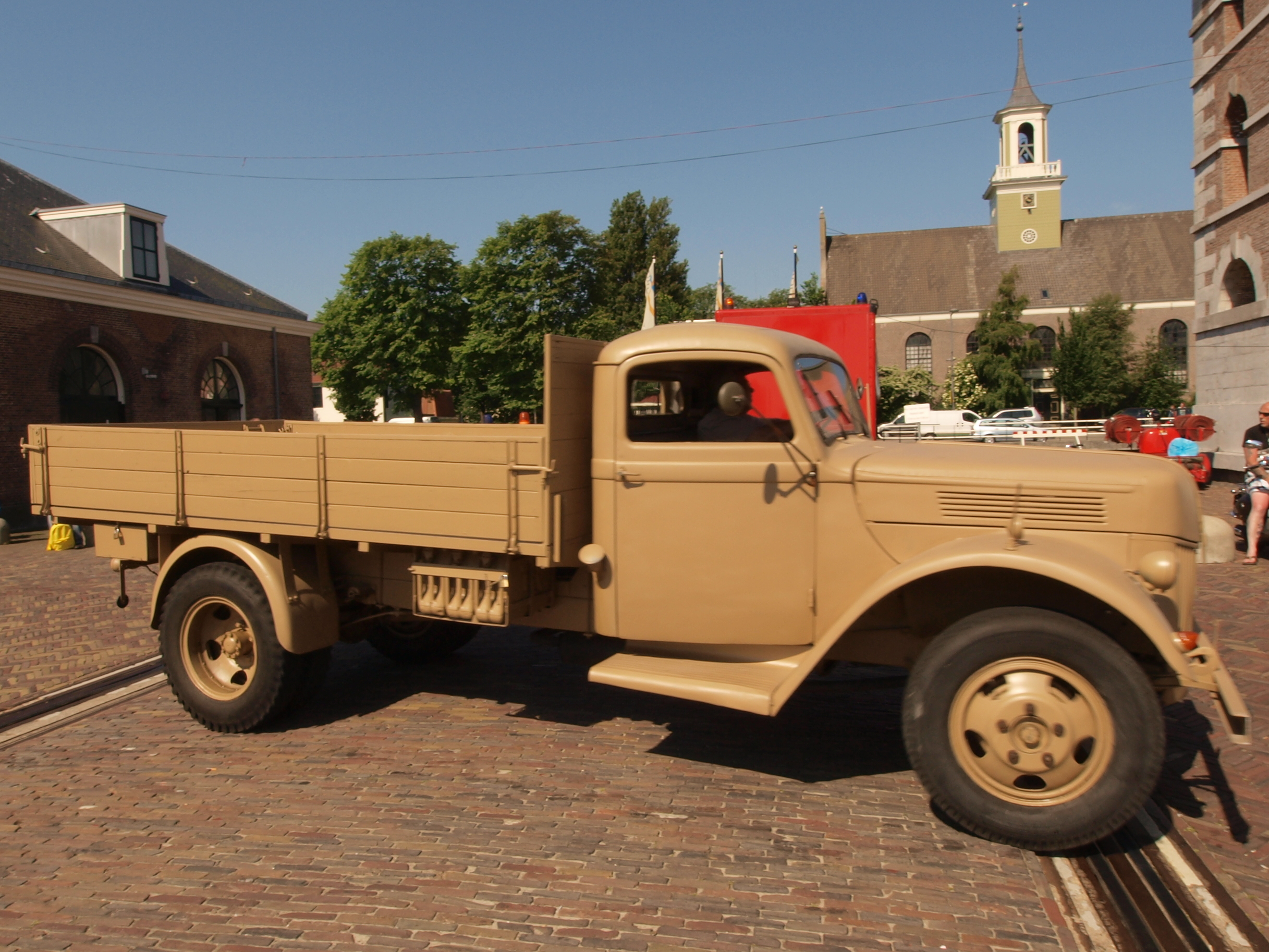

Overview
- Manufacturer: Ford Germany
- Production: 1948–1951
- Assembly: Cologne, Germany

Body and chassis
- Body style: Conventional
- Related: Ford Rhein

Chronology
- Predecessor: Ford V-3000S
- Successor: Ford FK

The Ford Ruhr (type G388T) is a truck model that Ford Germany manufactured together with its larger sister model Ford Rhein between 1948 and 1951.

The new truck came as a successor to the Ford V-3000S and was almost exactly the same. It had an in-line four-cylinder gasoline engine with a displacement of 3285 cm^{3}, which developed 52 hp (38 kW). The engine power was passed on to the rear wheels via a four- or five-speed gearbox. All-wheel drive was also available on request.

The trucks were usually delivered from the factory with an all-steel driver's cab in gray and a flatbed. The wheelbase was 4013 mm, the payload 3000 kg. From 1952, there were also vehicles with a wheelbase shortened to 3404 mm, with a payload of only 1500 or 2000 kg. They were offered as "express trucks".

The Ruhr was only available with a gasoline engine. Even the competitors only partially offered diesel engines, and gasoline engines could also be equipped with wood gasifiers, thus countering the fuel shortage of the post-war period. Later on, gasoline engines were a decisive disadvantage because they consume significantly more fuel (around 17 L/100 km) than similarly powerful diesel engines.

The successor, the Ford FK, was also offered with diesel engines.
