= Thames Trader =

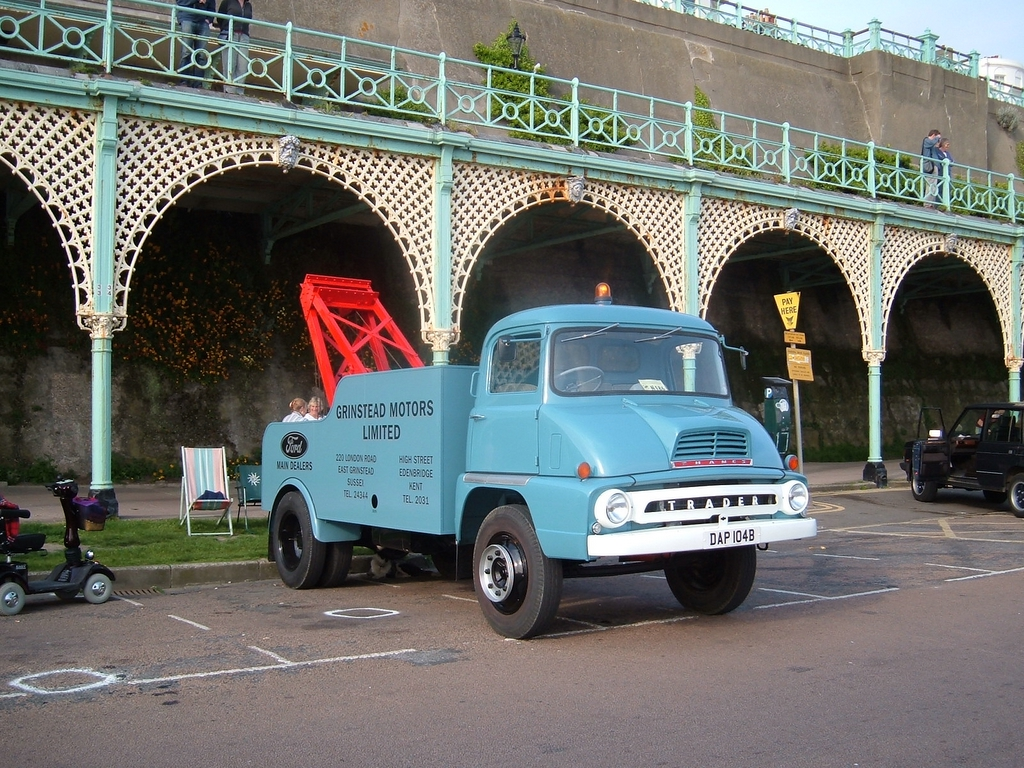
- 1964 Thames Trader Mark 2 recovery vehicle

Overview
- Manufacturer: Ford UK
- Production: 1957-1965
- Assembly: Dagenham, England; Istanbul, Turkey

Body and chassis
- Body style: 2-door pickup 2-door van double decker bus
- Layout: FR layout

Powertrain
- Engine: petrol: 3261 cc 505E I4; 4891 cc 508E I6; diesel: 3613 cc 530E (4D) I6; 5419 cc 510E (6D) I6

Dimensions
- Wheelbase: 118.0 in (2,997 mm); 138.0 in (3,505 mm); 152.0 in (3,861 mm); 160.0 in (4,064 mm); 108.0 in (2,743 mm)
- Length: 5,300–7,500 mm (209–295 in)
- Curb weight: 1,690–8,990 kg (3,726–19,820 lb)

Chronology
- Predecessor: Ford FK; Fordson Thames ET
- Successor: Ford D-Series (forward control); Ford A-Series (normal control)

The Thames Trader was a range of trucks manufactured by Ford UK built between 1957 and 1965.

== Forward Control models ==
=== Design ===
The distinctive cab design, which sets it apart from other British commercial vehicles, was a forward-control (or semi-forward control) design and the Thames Trader model covered a much wider weight range than the existing normal control ET Thames model or the earlier forward control 7V model. Both these earlier models had been based on Ford of America designs; the new Thames Trader was the first heavy commercial to be designed by Ford of Britain (although looking at the headlight surrounds suggests a family resemblance to the American Ford C series truck of the mid 1950s).

=== Mechanicals and wheelbase types ===
The Thames Trader model range covered weights from 2 to 7 tons, powered by either petrol or diesel engines in four- or six-cylinder guises. The lower-weight vehicles were available with 118- and 138-inch wheelbases, the heavy weight vehicle with 138-, 152- and 160-inch wheelbases; there was also a 108-inch tipper wheelbase. In addition there was a low-frame chassis model – typically used for furniture van bodywork.

The engines were all from the Dagenham engine family, originally developed for the Fordson tractor in 1952 but updated to Mark 2 specifications for the Thames Trader. All have a 115 mm (4.53 in) stroke; the petrol engines received a 95 mm (3.74 in) bore and the diesels 100 mm (3.94 in). The four-cylinder petrol engine displaces 199 cu in (3.3 L; 3,261 cc) and initially produced 68 bhp (51 kW) at 2,800 rpm, while the six-cylinder petrol is of 298 cu in (4.9 L; 4,891 cc) and produces 110 bhp (82 kW) at 2,800 rpm. The smaller diesel is of 220 cu in (3.6 L; 3,613 cc) and produces 70 bhp (52 kW) at 2,500 rpm, the 6D engine displaces 331 cu in (5.4 L; 5,419 cc) and produces 100 bhp (75 kW) at 2,500 rpm. The engines were mounted at a 45° slant to allow for more space above.

=== Mk2 ===
A Mk 2 version was introduced in mid-1962. Externally it is very easy to differentiate between Mk1 and Mk2 versions; the Mk1 has the words THAMES TRADER in red on a chrome strip along the bottom of the bonnet opening and the white painted grill between the headlights has a vertical divider with a red circular badge with 4 stars, whereas the Mk2 has just the word THAMES under the bonnet, and TRADER in white letters spaced out between the headlights replacing the divider and badge. The Mk2 Diesel engined variants had either a 4D or 6D chrome badge on each front wing, on the Mk1 it was a squarish chrome badge with either a red painted 4, 6, 4D, or 6D to indicate the engine configuration. The lower edge of the badge had a horizontal chrome strip running the length of the lower part of the wing.

== Normal Control models ==
Ford commenced production of the Thames Trader NC at the Dagenham factory in England in early 1962. It used the cabin developed by Ford Germany for their slow-selling Ford Köln truck, which had been discontinued in 1961. The NC designation indicated "normal control", as opposed to "forward control". The lighter duty Thames NC was initially fitted only with the four-cylinder petrol or diesel engine, now producing 73 and 70 bhp (54 and 52 kW) respectively. The first models ranged between 1.5 and 5 long tons (1,520 and 5,080 kg) capacity and replaced the earlier, semi-forward control Thames Trader of the same weights. After the discontinuation of the Thames brand in 1965 the NC was re-designated as the K Series. Ford Europe did not return to the market segment for normal control heavy-duty vans until 1973 with the Ford A-Series, which was based on the smaller Ford Transit.

== London Transport use ==
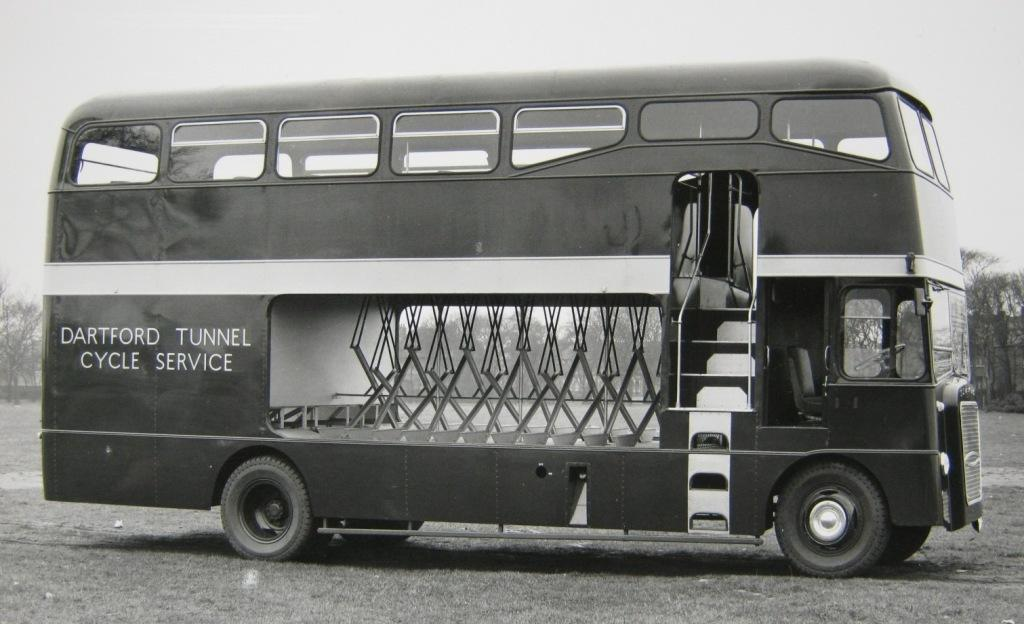
A bus designed to transport bicycles through the Dartford Tunnel in 1963

London Transport ordered five double decker buses based on the Thames Trader for special duties, taking cyclists through the Dartford Tunnel. These had a lower deck purpose built for carrying bicycles, with the upper deck for cyclists. Unusually, these buses had their stairwell several feet above the level of the road, accessible by a ladder. The service was later dropped in 1965, owing to lack of cycle traffic and possibly the design.

== Gallery ==
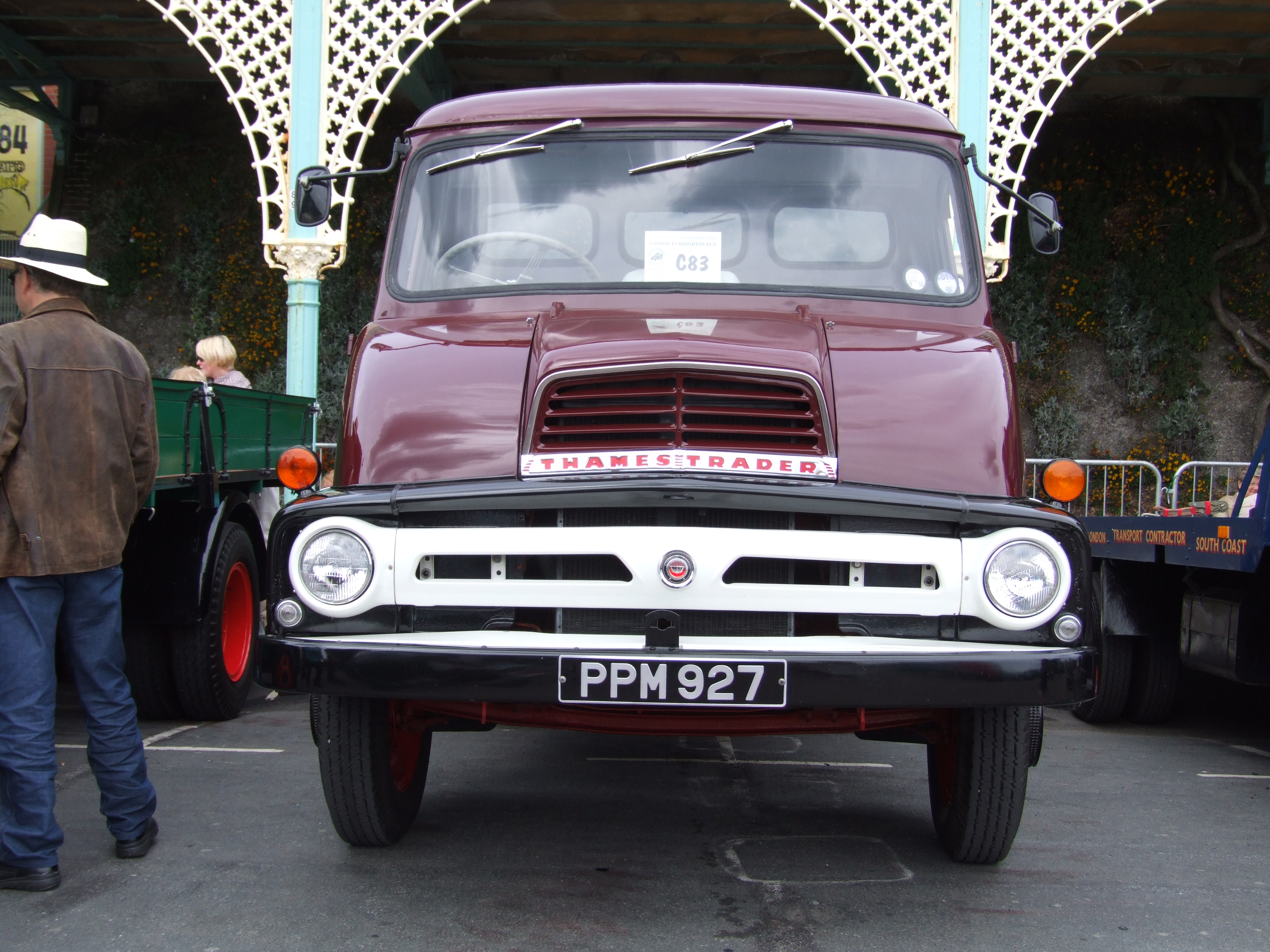
1959 Thames Trader

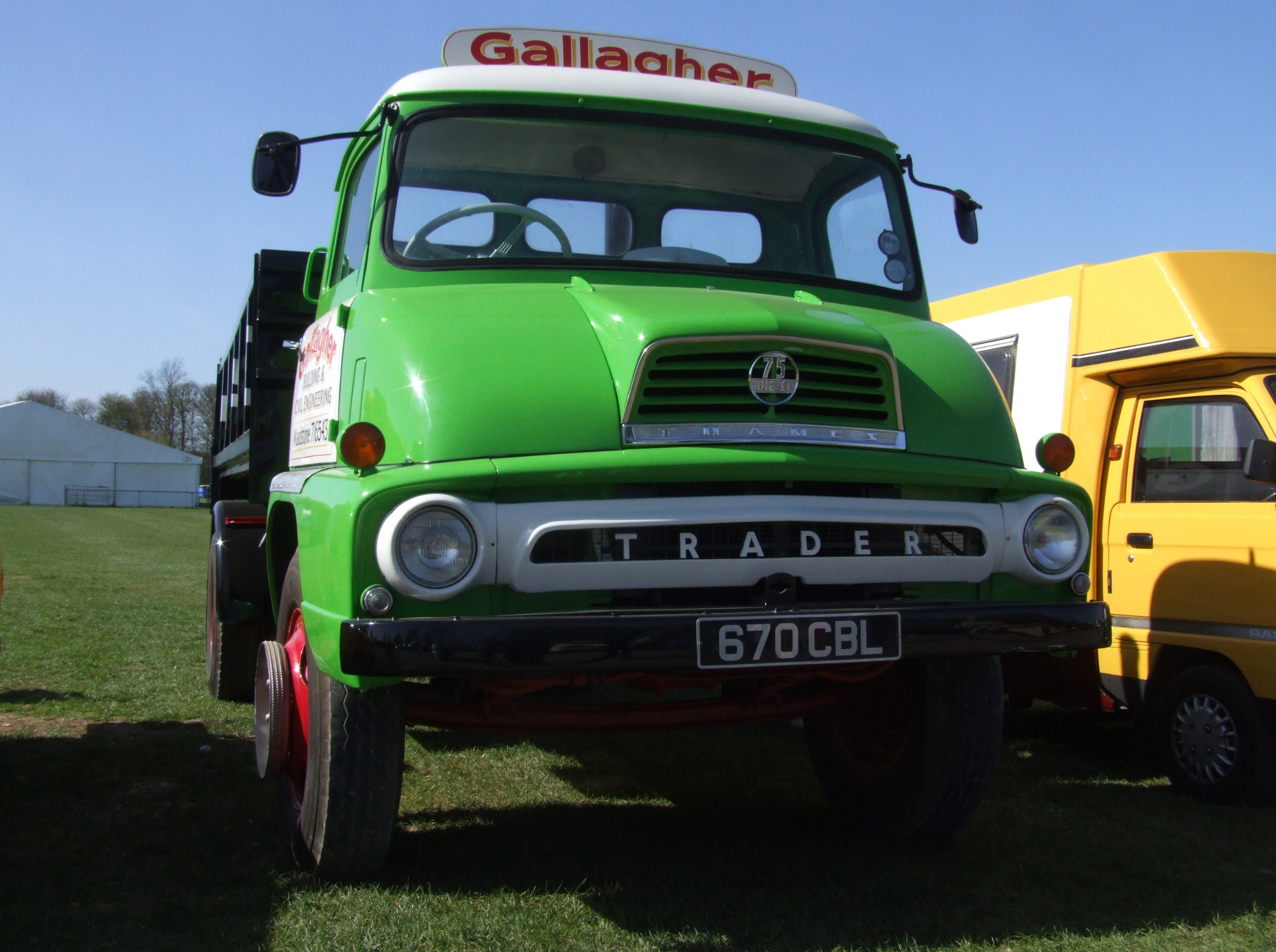
Thames Trader Mark 2

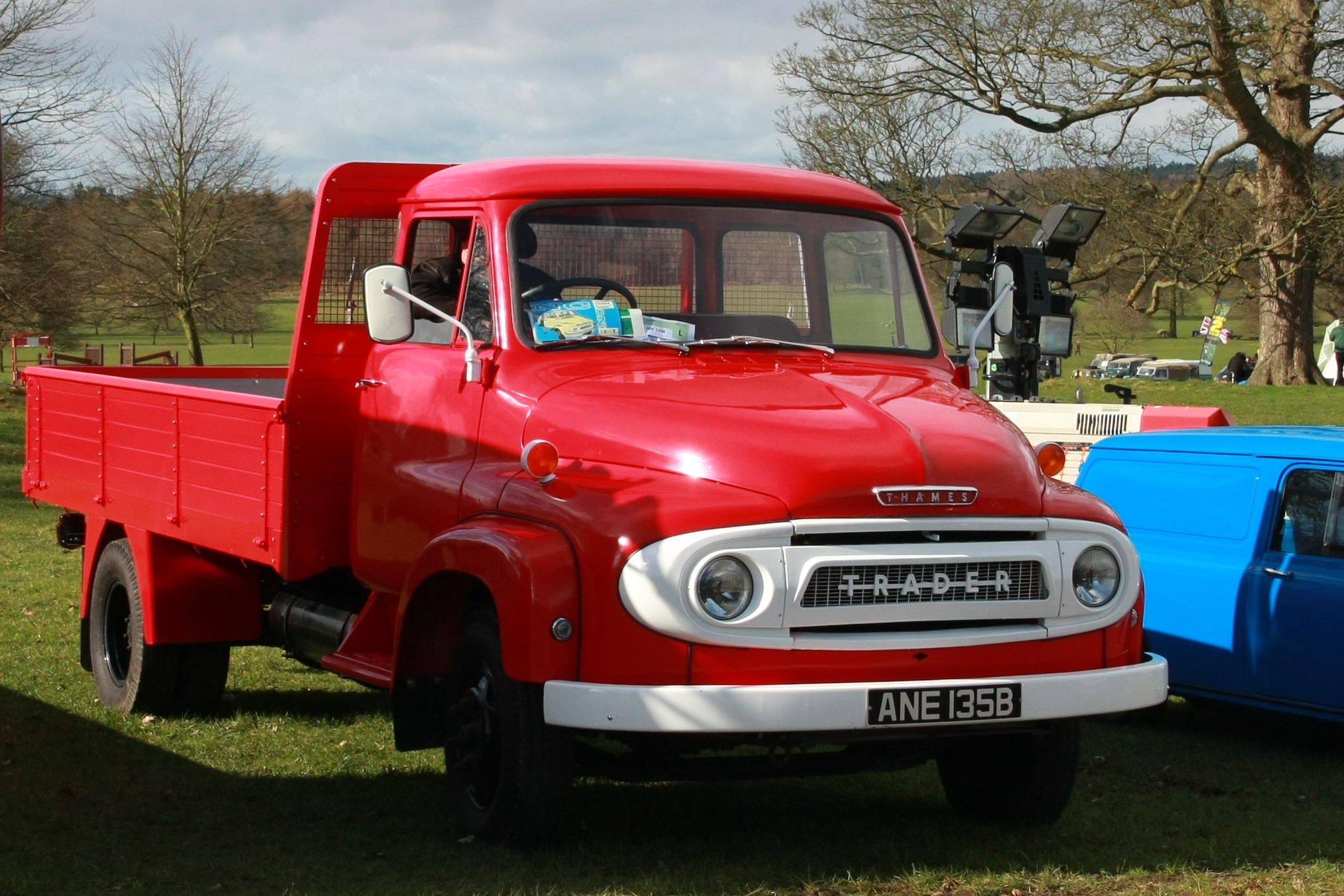
1964 Thames Trader NC
