= Ford Rhein =

Ford truck

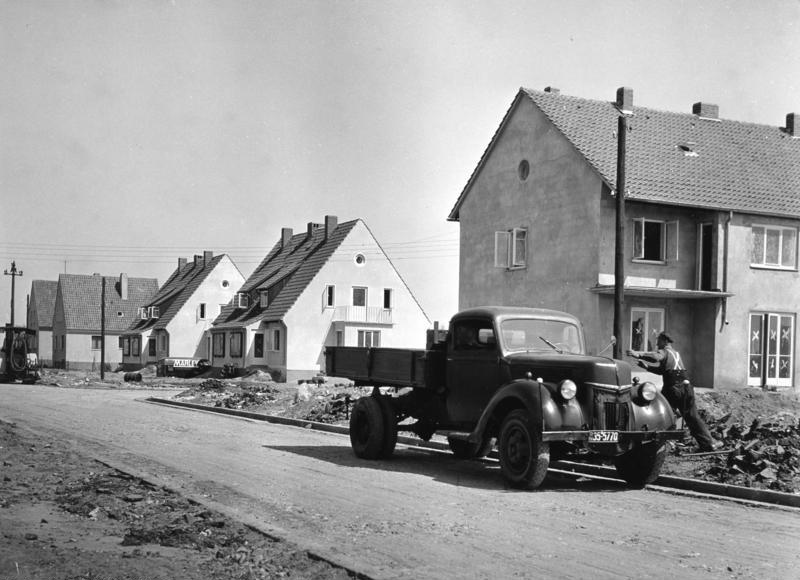

Overview
- Manufacturer: Ford Germany
- Production: 1948–1951
- Assembly: Cologne, Germany

Body and chassis
- Body style: Conventional

Chronology
- Predecessor: Ford Modell V8-51
- Successor: Ford FK

The Ford Rhein (type G398TS) is a truck model that Ford Germany manufactured together with its smaller sister model Ford Ruhr between 1948 and 1951.

The new truck came as the successor to the Ford V8-51 and offered only a few changes to it such as larger headlights. It had a V8 gasoline engine with 3924 cc displacement, which initially produced 90 PS (66 kW) and was increased by 5 PS to 95 PS (70 kW) from 1949. The engine power was passed on to the rear wheels via a four or five-speed gearbox. An all-wheel drive system by Marmon-Herrington was also available on request. After a thorough modernization in 1951, the Rhein/Ruhr range was renamed Ford FK, followed by a four-digit code indicating its weight rating.

== Design ==
The trucks were usually delivered from the factory with an all-steel driver's cab in gray and a flatbed. The wheelbase was 4013 mm, the payload 3000 kg. From 1949, however, there were also two low-floor chassis for buses and special bodies with an extended wheelbase and front-link chassis with an engine built into the rear. Drauz or NWF built buses with up to 25 seats and 33 standing places on it.

== Engines ==
While the use of gasoline engines initially proved to be an advantage, because they could also be equipped with wood gas gasifiers to counter the petrol shortage, these models later found it difficult to prevail against competitors with diesel engines due to their high petrol consumption. Kämper and others soon started offering diesel engine conversions.

Later successors, the FK 2500 to FK 4500, were equipped with two-stroke diesel engines.
