= Ford D series =

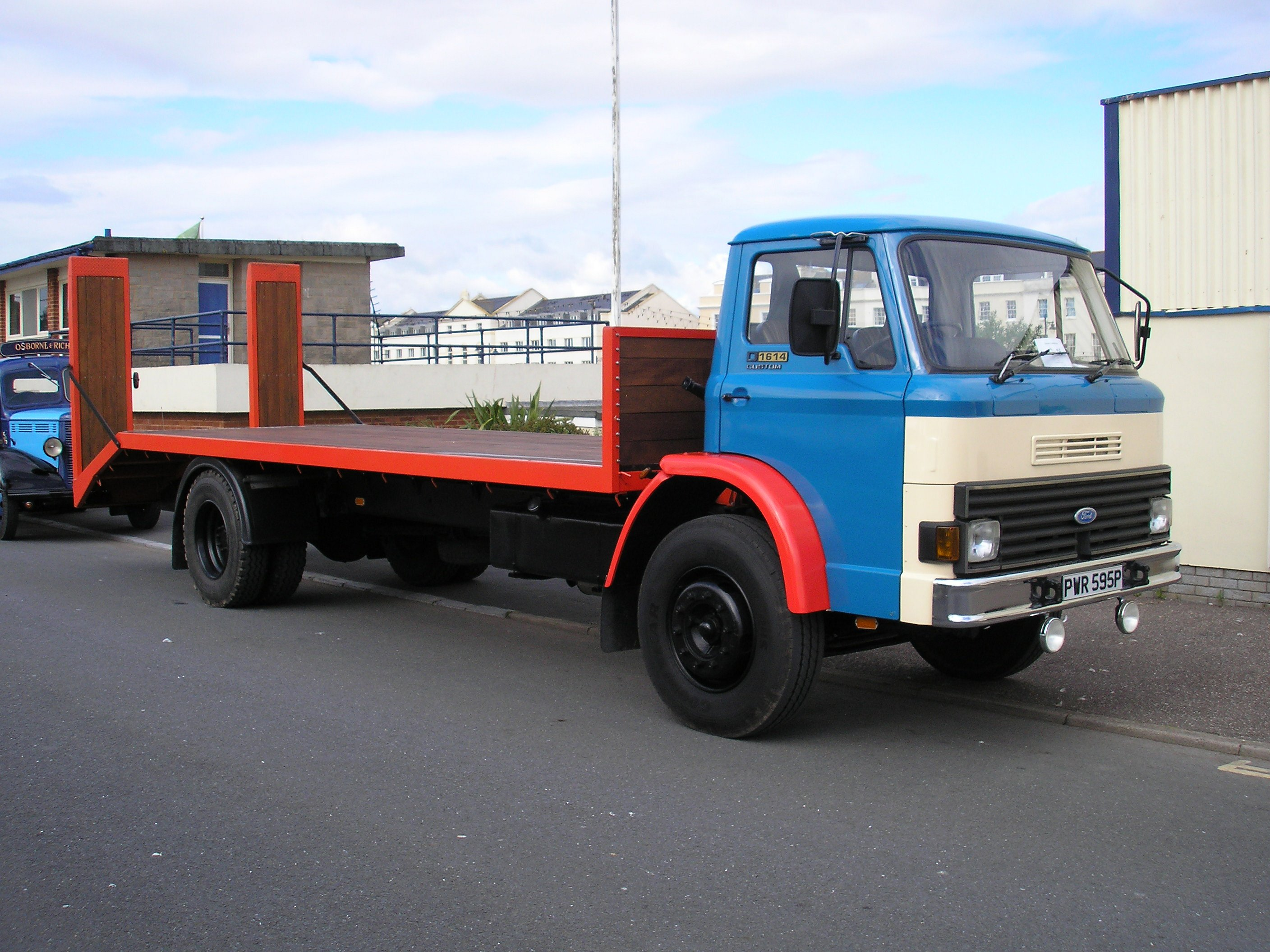

Overview
- Manufacturer: Ford UK
- Production: 1965-1981
- Assembly: Langley Berkshire UK Cork Ireland Seaview New Zealand

Powertrain
- Engine: Ford; Cummins
- Transmission: Manual

Dimensions
- Wheelbase: Variable

Chronology
- Predecessor: Thames Trader
- Successor: Ford Cargo

The Ford D series is a range of middle-weight trucks that were introduced by Ford UK in 1965. It replaced the Thames Trader and appears to have been envisaged as a more modern competitor to the Bedford TK produced by General Motors' UK truck subsidiary.

== History ==
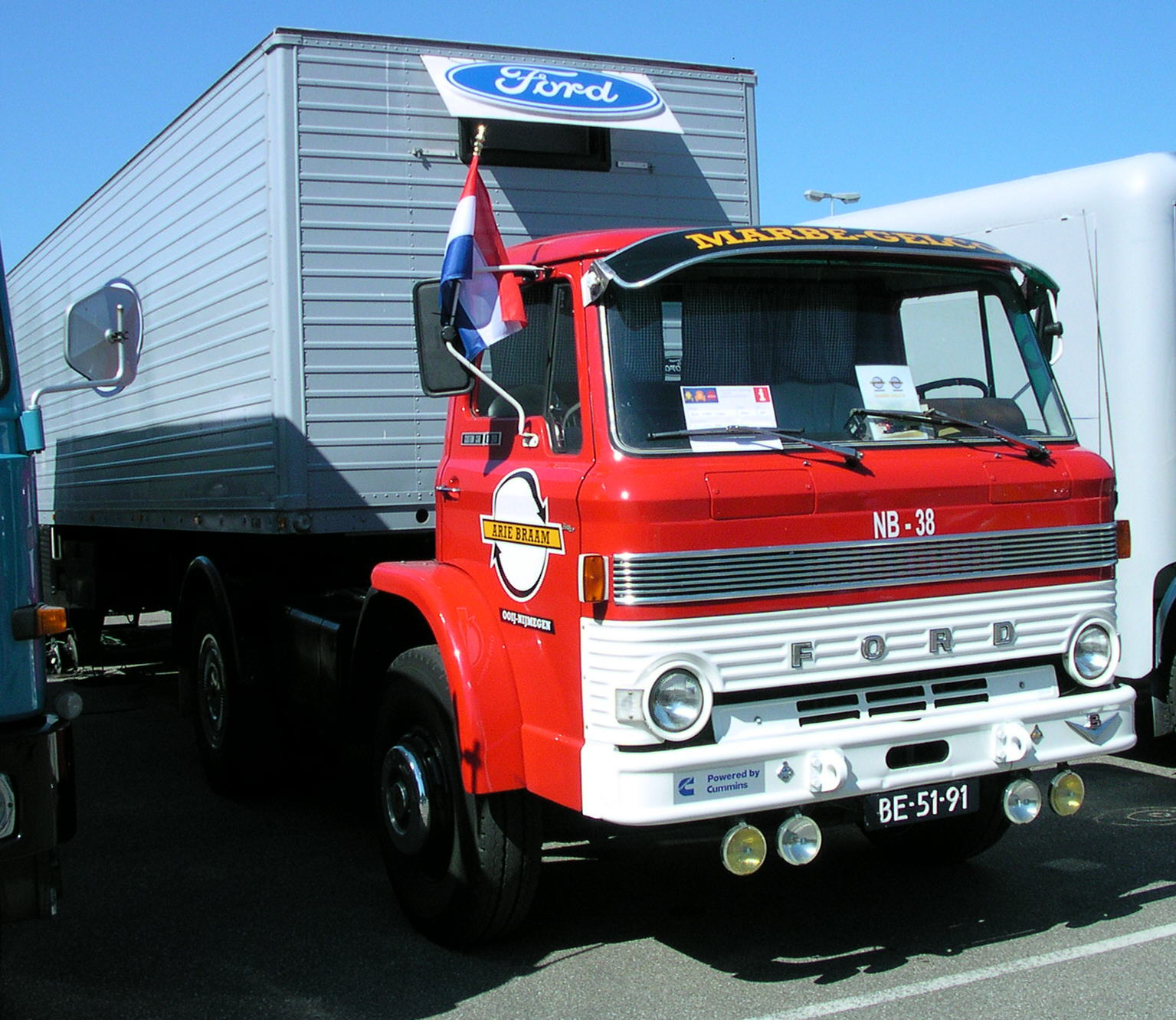
Ford D1000 (UK nomenclature), powered by Cummins Diesel 7.7 unit

In 1965, the range covered rigid trucks with gross weights from 5.2 to 12.75 British tons, and tippers from 10.8 to 12.75 tons. Higher gross weights became available with the subsequent introduction of versions featuring twin rear axles and articulated models were also quickly added to the range.

Three new diesel engines were developed for the trucks, respectively of 3.97 litres, 5.42 litres and 5.95 litres cylinder capacity. The smallest unit was of four cylinders while the larger engines employed six cylinders. Claimed power ranged from 82.5 bhp to 128 bhp. Possibly with an eye to export markets outside Europe, petrol-engined versions with power outputs of 129 bhp and 149 bhp were also offered.

As on the Bedford TK and on various US built heavy trucks of the time, the cabin was a flat fronted forward control unit positioned above the engine. Engine access was achieved by tilting the entire cab forwards: the hinge at the front employed a torsion-bar counterbalancing system which according to commentators made tilting the cab to access the engine "almost a one-hand job". The engines were installed at an angle of 45 degrees from the vertical which was intended to enable the cab interior to feature a virtually flat floor without the cab itself becoming excessively tall.

April 1967 saw the range expanded upwards with the arrival of the Phase II D1000 series, designed for operation up to a weight of 28 tons gross, and at that time the largest trucks ever produced by Ford of Britain. The D1000s were powered by Cummins produced V8 diesel engines of 7.7 litres displacement.

The 1978 model year saw a front-end facelift of the cab, which gained the new corporate nose being adopted by Ford of Europe's passenger car range of the period with square headlamps and the black plastic louvred "Aeroflow" grille; the same changes were adopted for the facelifted Transit around the same time.

In 1981 the range was replaced by the Ford Cargo in European markets and by the Ford N series (badge-engineered Hino Ranger) in Australasia.

Hyundai produced the D-750 and D-800 models under license from 1969 to 1972. It was the first Hyundai-manufactured commercial vehicle. It was succeeded by the Hyundai Bison.
