= List of Ford vehicles =

Ford Motor Company sells a broad range of vehicles under the Ford marque worldwide. The following list does not include other marques owned or formerly owned by Ford, such as Lincoln, Mercury, Edsel and Merkur.

== Current production vehicles ==
Body style	Model			Current generation			Vehicle description
Body style	Image	Name(s)	Introduction (cal. year)	Introduction (cal. year)	Facelift	Main markets	Vehicle description
Sedan		Mondeo/ Taurus	1992	2022	2025	China and Middle East	D-segment/Large family/mid-size sedan and liftback currently marketed in China and manufactured by Changan Ford. Marketed as the Taurus in the Middle East.
Sports car		Mustang	1964	2022	–	Global	Long-running pony/muscle car. Available in coupé and convertible body styles.
SUV/ crossover		Puma	2019	2019	2024	Europe and Australasia	B-segment/subcompact crossover SUV based on the Fiesta marketed in Europe and Australasia.
SUV/ crossover		Puma Gen-E	2024	2024	—	Europe and Australasia	Battery electric subcompact crossover based on the Puma for the European market.
SUV/ crossover		Capri EV	2024	2024	—	Europe	Battery electric C-segment/compact crossover for the European market, based on the Volkswagen Group MEB platform.
SUV/ crossover		Bronco Sport	2020	2020	—	Americas and Middle East	Retro-styled compact crossover SUV using the Bronco nameplate.
SUV/ crossover		Edge	2006	2023	—	China and Panama	D-segment/Mid-size crossover marketed in China and manufactured by Changan Ford.
SUV/ crossover		Escape	2000	2019	2022	Americas, Europe, Australasia	C-segment/compact crossover SUV marketed globally. Escape (global nameplate) and Kuga (Europe) was a separate model up to 2012 when the model was merged. Hybrid and plug-in hybrid powertrains are optional.
SUV/ crossover		Kuga	2008	2019	2022	Americas, Europe, Australasia	C-segment/compact crossover SUV marketed globally. Escape (global nameplate) and Kuga (Europe) was a separate model up to 2012 when the model was merged. Hybrid and plug-in hybrid powertrains are optional.
SUV/ crossover		Mondeo Sport	2021	2021	—	China	Mid-size crossover coupe marketed in China and manufactured by Changan Ford. Marketed as the Ford Evos before 2024.
SUV/ crossover		Explorer EV	2024	2024	—	Europe	Battery electric compact crossover for the European market, based on the Volkswagen Group MEB platform.
SUV/ crossover		Mustang Mach-E	2020	2020	—	Global	Battery electric compact crossover using the Mustang nameplate.
SUV/ crossover		Territory / Equator Sport	2018	2022	2024	Asia, Africa, Middle East and South America	Compact crossover SUV manufactured by JMC-Ford in China, and exported to emerging countries.
SUV/ crossover		Equator	2021	2021	2024	China	Three-row mid-size crossover marketed in China and manufactured by JMC-Ford.
SUV/ crossover		Explorer	1990	2019	2024	Americas, Europe, Middle East and Asia	Three-row mid-size crossover SUV. Also available as a police fleet vehicle called the Police Interceptor Utility. Hybrid and plug-in hybrid powertrains are optional.
SUV/ crossover		Bronco	1965	2020	—	Americas, Europe and Middle East	Off-road oriented mid-size body-on-frame SUV. Available in three-door and five-door configurations.
SUV/ crossover		Bronco New Energy	2025	2025	—	China	Mid-size crossover SUV marketed in China and manufactured by JMC-Ford. Battery electric and range extended powertrains are optional.
SUV/ crossover		Everest	2003	2022	—	Asia-Pacific, Africa and Middle East	Mid-size body-on-frame SUV based on the Ranger.
SUV/ crossover		Expedition	1996	2025	—	Americas and Middle East	Full-size body-on-frame SUV. Also available with a longer body variant called the Expedition Max.
Pickup truck		Transit	1965	2013	2020	Europe and Australasia	Pickup version of the Transit van.
Pickup truck		Maverick	2021	2021	2025	Americas	Compact pickup truck sold in North America and South America. Based on a front-wheel-drive unibody platform shared with the Escape and Bronco Sport.
Pickup truck		Ranger	1981	2022	–	Global	Mid-size pickup truck sold globally. Available in single cab (except North America), space cab, and double cab configurations.
Pickup truck		F-Series	1948	2020	2023	Americas and Middle East	Full-size pickup truck mainly marketed in North America. Historically the best-selling vehicle in the United States (since 1977) and Canada. Line-up includes the F-150 pickup, F-250 through F-450 Super Duty heavy duty pickups. F-450/550 Super Duty class 4-5 trucks and F-650/750 Super Duty class 6-8 trucks are commercial chassis and cab vehicles.
MPV/ minivan		Tourneo Courier	2014	2022	—	Europe	Passenger version of the Transit Courier.
MPV/ minivan		Tourneo Connect	2002	2021	—	Europe	Two- or three-row compact MPV. Rebadged Volkswagen Caddy.
MPV/ minivan		Tourneo Custom	2012	2022	—	Europe	Passenger version of the Transit Custom marketed in Europe.
Van		Transit Courier	2014	2023	—	Europe and others	Small van based on Fiesta platform mainly marketed in Europe. Available as a four-door or five-door van. The passenger-focused leisure activity vehicle version is called the Tourneo Courier.
Van		Transit Connect	2002	2024	—	Europe and others	Compact van based on Focus platform mainly marketed in Europe and formerly in North America from 2010-2023. Available as a four-door or five-door van. The passenger-focused leisure activity vehicle version is called the Tourneo Connect.
Van		Transit City	2026	2026	—	Europe	Battery electric mid-size van manufactured by JMC-Ford in China, and exported to Europe, based on the JMC E-Fushun.
Van		Transit Custom	2012	2022	—	Europe and others	Mid-size van mainly marketed in Europe, Australasia and China. Available as a four-door or five-door van. The passenger-focused leisure activity vehicle version is called the Tourneo Custom. A campervan version is called the Transit Custom Nugget.
Van		Transit	1965	2013	2020	Global	Full-size, rear-wheel-drive van. Available as a cargo van, passenger van, chassis cab, and cutaway van.
Heavy commercial vehicles		Transit Cutaway	1965	2013	2020	Europe, North America and others	Cutaway version of the Transit van.
Heavy commercial vehicles		E-Series Cutaway	1975	1992	2021	North America	A cutaway version of the E-Series.
Heavy commercial vehicles		Super Duty	1999	2023	—	North America	Chassis-cab versions of the Super Duty pickups.
Heavy commercial vehicles		F-Series	1948	2015	2020	North America	Commercial medium-duty and heavy-duty trucks derived from the smaller F-Series pickup trucks.
Heavy commercial vehicles		F-MAX	2018	2018	—	Europe	Heavy-duty truck developed and manufactured by Ford Otosan in Turkey. Sold in China as the JMC Weilong HV5.

== Former production vehicles ==
=== 1900–1929 ===
Name	Orig.	Produced	Image
Cars
Model A	USA	1903-1904	
Model B	USA	1904–1906	
Model C	USA	1904–1905	
Model F	USA	1905–1906	
Model K	USA	1906–1908	
Model N / R / S	USA	1906–1909	
Model T	USA	1908–1927	
Model A (1927)	USA	1927–1931	
Trucks
Model TT	USA	1925–1927	
Model AA	USA	1927–1931	

=== 1930–1939 ===
Name	Orig.	Produced	Image
Cars
Model B / BB / 18 / 40	USA	1932–1934	
Model Y	UK	1932–1937	
Köln	GER	1932–1935	
Rheinland	GER	1933–1936	
Model 48	USA	1935–1936	
Model C Ten	UK	1935–1937	
Eifel	GER	1935–1939	
Ford CX	UK	1935–1937, UK	
1937	USA	1937–1940	
7W	UK	1937–1938, UK	
7Y	UK	1938–1939, UK	
Prefect	UK	1938–1961	
Anglia	UK	1939–1967	
Taunus	GER	1939–1994	
Trucks
Fordson E83W	UK	1938–1957	

=== 1940–1949 ===
Name	Orig.	Produced	Image
Cars
1941	USA	1941–1942; 1946–1948	
Vedette	FRA	1948–1954	
Pilot	UK	1947–1951	
1949	USA	1949–1951	
Custom (Note: Used periodically between 1949 and 1981.)	USA	1949–1981	

=== 1950–1959 ===
Name	Orig.	Produced	Image
Cars
1952	USA	1952–1954	
1955	USA	1955–1956	
1957	USA	1957–1959	
Consul	UK	1951–1962; 1972–1975	
Country Sedan	USA	1952–1974	
Country Squire	USA	1950–1991	
Courier	USA	1952–2013	
Crestline (Note: (1952–1954 as independent model; 1950–1951 as Custom submodel).)	USA	1950–1951	
Del Rio	USA	1957–1958	
Escort (100E)	UK	1955–1961	
Fairlane	USA	1955–1970	
Galaxie	USA	1959–1974 (Note: Production years in North America; 1964-1968, Australia; 1967-1983, Brazil.)	
Mainline	USA	1952–1956	
Parklane	USA	1956	
Popular	UK	1953–1962	
Ranchero	USA	1957–1979	
Squire	UK	1955–1959	
Thunderbird	USA	1955–1997; 2002–2005	
Versailles	FRA	1954–1957	
Zephyr	UK	1950–1971	
Trucks
C Series (Note: Medium-duty COE truck.)	USA	1957–1990	
FK	GER	1951–1961	

=== 1960–1969 ===
Name	Orig.	Produced	Image
Cars
Starliner	USA	1960–1964	
Falcon	USA	1960–1970	
Falcon	AUS	1960–2016	
E-Series / Econoline	USA	1961–2014	
Cortina	UK	1962–1982	
Fairlane; Thunderbolt (Note: Limited production car.)	USA	1964	
GT40	USA	1964–1969	
Corsair (Note: Produced 1989–1992 in Australia.)	UK	1964–1970	
LTD	USA	1965–1986	
Fairmont	AUS	1965-2008	
P7	GER	1967-1972	
Fairlane	AUS	1967–2007	
Torino	USA	1968–1976	
Capri (coupe) (Note: There was another "Ford Capri" in Australia, launched in 1989.)	EU	1968–1986	
Corcel	BR	1968–1986	
Escort (Note: This was the version produced and marketed in Latin America.)	EU	1968–2000	
Trucks
N-Series	USA	1962–1969	
D-Series	UK	1965-1981	
W-Series	USA	1966–1977	

=== 1970–1979 ===
Name	Orig.	Produced	Image
Cars
Maverick	USA	1970–1979	
Pinto	USA	1971–1980	
P100 (Note: Ford Cortina pickup. Produced first in South Africa, then in Portugal.)	ZAF	1971–1993	
Granada	GER	1972–1994	
Landau	BRA	1971–1983	
Landau	AUS	1973–1976	
Elite (Note: Initially, Elite a luxury version of the Gran Torino model, then an own model.)	USA	1974–1976	
Granada	USA	1975–1982	
Fiesta	EU	1976–2023	
Fairmont	USA	1978–1983	
Durango	USA	1979–1982	
Vans
Econovan / Spectron (Note: A rebadged Mazda Bongo.)	JPN	1977–1999	
Trucks
L-Series	USA	1970–1998	
Courier (Note: A rebadged Mazda B series.)	JPN	1971–2007	
Fiera	PHI	1972–1986	
Transcontinental	EU	1975–1984	
CL-Series	USA	1978–1991	

=== 1980–1989 ===
Name	Orig.	Produced	Image
Cars
Capri	AUS	1989–1994	
Del Rey	BRA	1981–1991	
Escort	USA	1981–2003	
EXP	USA	1982–1988	
Festiva (Note: A rebadged Mazda 121.)	JPN	1988–1992	
Laser (Note: Sold in Asia and Oceania, also named "Meteor".)	JPN	1980–2003	
LTD Crown Victoria	USA	1980–1991	
Orion	EU	1983–1993	
Probe	USA	1989–1997	
RS200	EU	1984–1986	
Scorpio	GER	1985–1999	
Sierra (Note: Also sold as the Azura in some markets.)	GER	1982–1992	
Telstar (Note: A rebadged Mazda Capella.)	JPN	1983–1999	
Taurus	USA	1985–2019	
Tempo	USA	1984–1994	
Verona (Note: Also "Volkswagen Apollo", produced by AutoLatina.)	BRA	1989–2000	
Corsair (Note: A rebadged Nissan Pintara in Australia.)	AUS	1989–1992	
SUVs
Maverick (Note: A rebadged Nissan Patrol in Australia.)	JPN	1988–1994	
Bronco II	USA	1984–1990	
Vans
Aerostar	USA	1986–1997	
Trucks
Cargo	USA	1982–2019	
N-Series (Note: Rebadged Hino Ranger for the Australian market.)	JPN	1982–1997	
Bantam	ZAF	1983–2011	
Pronto (Note: A rebadged Suzuki Carry only for Taiwan.)	TWN	1985–2007	

=== 1990–1999 ===
Name	Orig.	Produced	Image
Cars
Versailles	BRA	1991–1996	
Aspire	USA	1993–1997	
Contour (Note: The Mondeo first generation in USA.)	USA	1995–2000	
Cougar (Note: Rebadged Mercury Cougar in USA.)	EU	1999–2002	
Crown Victoria	USA	1992–2011	
Ka	EU	1996–2021	
Puma (coupe)	EU	1997–2002	
Activa (Note: A rebadged Mazda Familia.)	JPN	1998–2003	
Focus	EU	1998–2025	
Ikon (Note: Marketed as "Fiesta" sedan version in South America.)	IND	1999–2015	
SUVs
Raider (Note: A rebadged Mazda B series in Australia.)	JPN	1991–1997	
Maverick (Note: A rebadged Nissan Terrano II.)	JPN	1993–1999	
Explorer	USA	1994–2003	
Vans / minivans
Freda (Note: A rebadged Mazda Bongo.)	JPN	1995–2002	
Galaxy	EU	1995–2023	
Windstar	USA	1995–2003	
Ixion (Note: A rebadged Mazda Premacy.)	JPN	1999–2003	

=== 2000–2009 ===
Name	Orig.	Produced	Image
Cars
GT	USA	2005–2022	
Five Hundred	USA	2005–2007	
Fusion	USA	2006–2020	
Fusion Hybrid	USA	2010–2020	
SUVs
Excursion	USA	2000–2005	
EcoSport	IND; BRA	2003–2022	
Territory	AUS	2004–2016	
Freestyle	USA	2005–2007	
Edge	USA	2006–2024	
Taurus X	USA	2008–2009	
Flex	USA	2009–2019	
Minivans
Fusion	EU	2002–2012	
i-Max (Note: A rebadged Mazda Premacy, marketed in some Asian countries.)	JPN	2007–2011	
C-Max (Note: Also called "Focus C-Max".)	EU	2003–2019	
Freestar	USA	2003–2007	
S-Max	EU	2006–2023	
Trucks / pickups
Explorer Sport Trac	USA	2001–2010	
LCF (Note: for "Low Cab Forward".)	USA	2006–2009	

=== 2010–2019 ===
Name	Orig.	Produced	Image
Cars
Figo (Note: It had a crossover variant called "Freestyle".)	IND	2010–2021	
Fusion Energi	USA	2012–2020	
Focus Electric	USA	2012–2019	
Escort	China	2015–2023	
Taurus	China	2015–2022	
Minivans
Grand C-Max	EU	2010–2019	
B-Max	EU	2012–2017	

=== 2020–2029 ===
Name	Orig.	Produced	Image
pickups
F-150 Lightning (Note: Battery electric version of the Ford F-Series (fourteenth generation).)	USA	2022–2025	

== Tractors ==
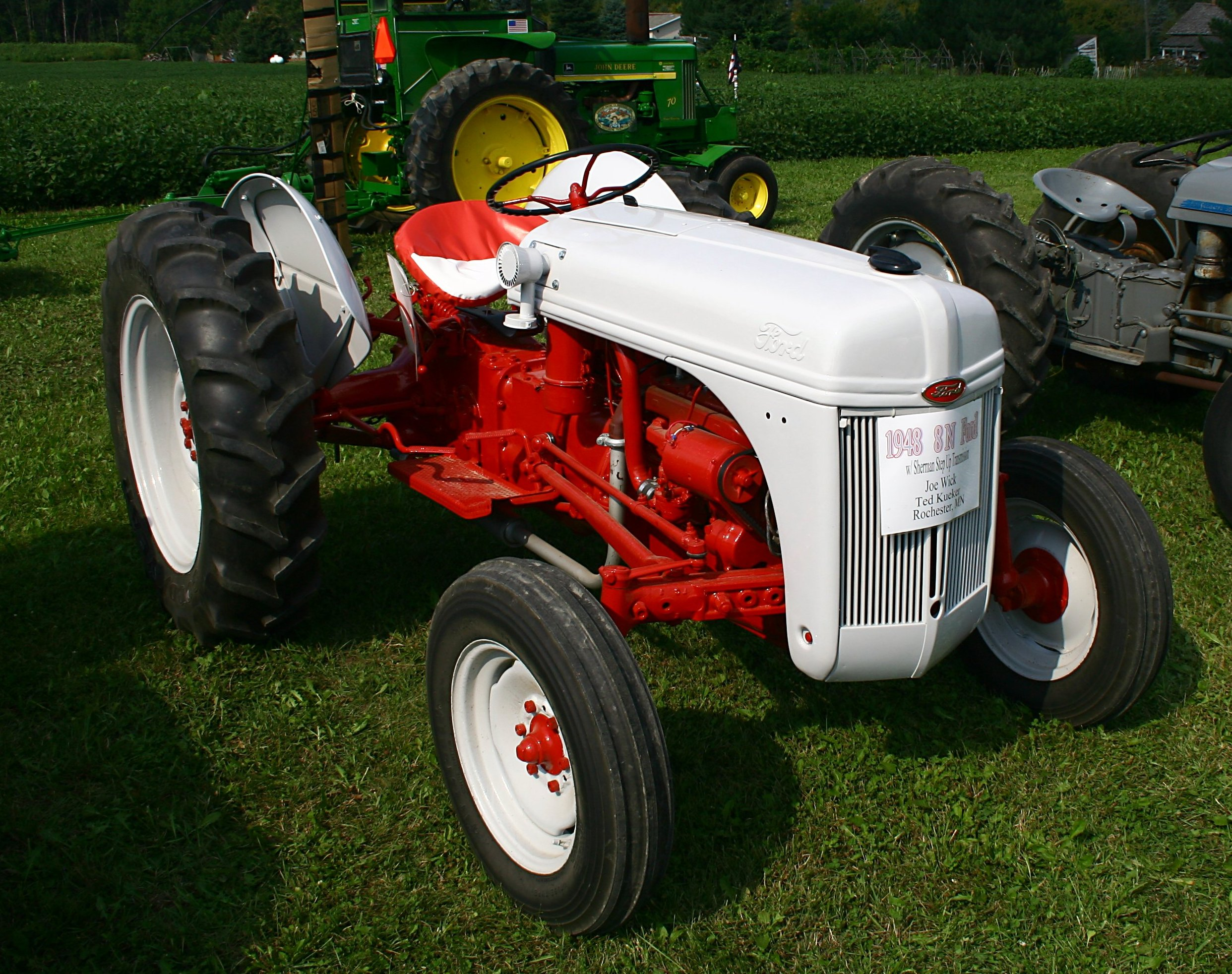
N-series

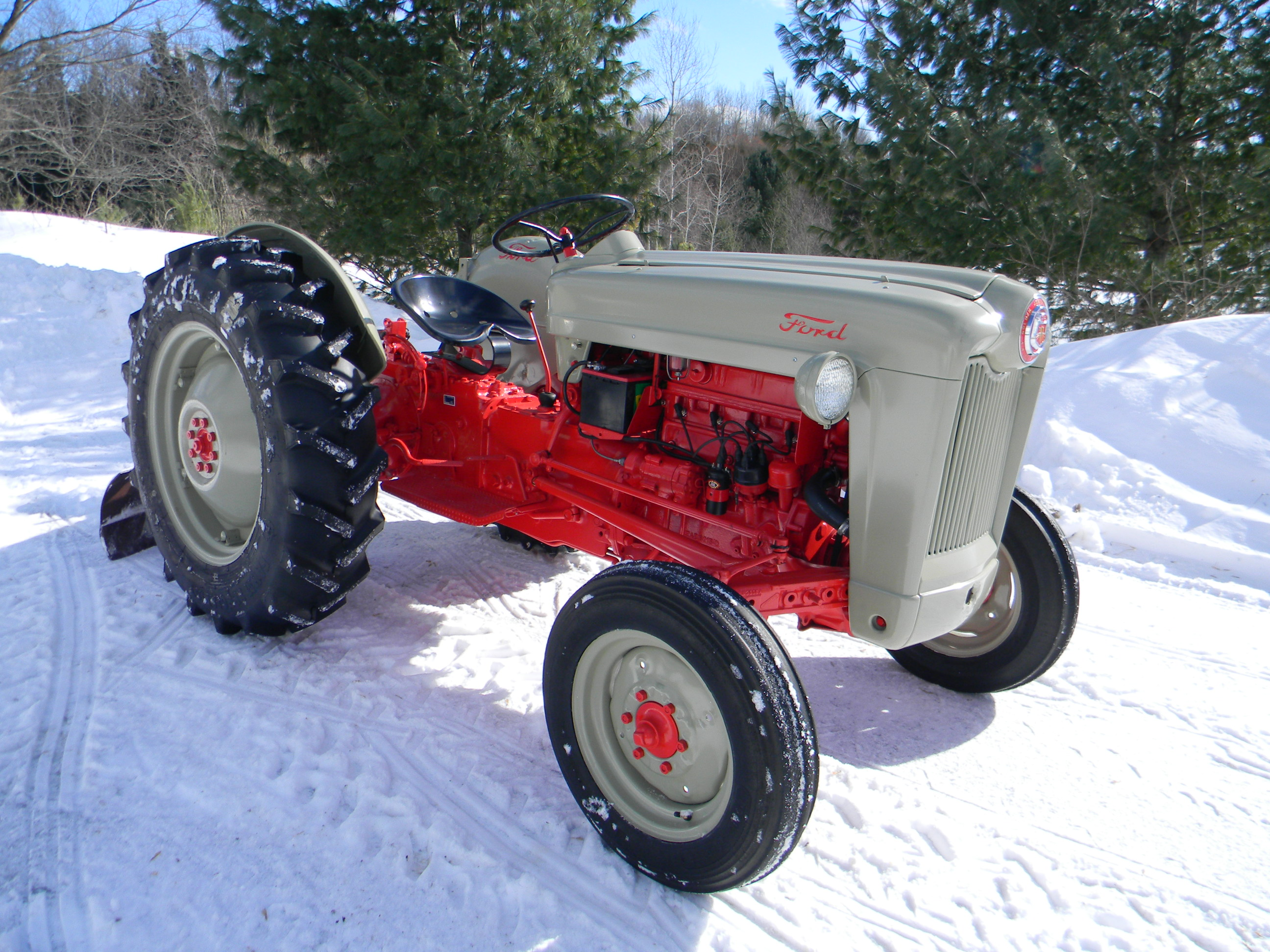
1953 NAA Golden Jubilee

- N-series
- NAA (a.k.a.; Golden Jubilee)
- 600 Series
- Workmaster
- Powermaster

Ford *000 "Thousand" series

- 1000, 2000, 3000, 4000, 5000, 6000, 7000, 8000, and 9000

Ford *600 "Six-Hundred" and *700 "Seven-Hundred" series

- 1600, 2600, 3600, 4600, 5600, 6600, 7600 (Four cylinder, utility, straddle mount)
- 5700, 6700, 7700 (Row-crop versions of their 600 series counterparts)
- 8600, 9600 (Six-cylinder row-crop)
- 8700, 9700 (Later version of their 600 series counterparts.)

Also, since the 8000 and up models were only made in the US, the 8100 and 8200 models were produced in Europe to meet the market's need for a 100 hp+ tractor. This was done by using the 7600 transmission and rear end and mating it to the Ford six-cylinder industrial engine with a special cast iron subframe for added strength.

Ford **10 series

- 2810, 2910, 3610, 3910, 4110, 4610, 5110, 5610, 6610, 6710, 7410, 7610, 7710, 7910, and 8210 (Mark I, II and III)
- 7810, 6810, and 6410(Mark II and III)

Ford TW series

- TW-10, TW-20, and TW-30 (123-175 hp)
- TW-5, TW-15, TW-25, and TW-35 (122-187 hp)
- TW-15 (Mark II), TW-25 (Mark II), and TW-35 (Mark II) (137-195 hp)

Ford FW series

- FW-20, FW-30, FW-40, and FW-60 (210-335 hp) These tractors were heavy duty articulated four-wheel-drive tractors built by Steiger in Fargo, North Dakota, US, for Ford Tractor Operation.
- FW-25, and FW-35 (163-195 hp) These tractors were large articulated four-wheel-drive tractors built by Waltanna in Tarrington, Victoria, Australia, for Ford Tractor Operation for the Australian market.

Ford **30 Utility series

- 3230, 3430, 3930, 3930 turbo, 4130, 4630, 4630 turbo, 4830, and 5030 (small tractors)

Ford 8*30 Powershift series

- 8530, 8630, 8730, and 8830 (117-189 hp)(Mark III)

Ford **40 series

- 5640, 6640, 7740, 7840, 8240, and 8340

In 1986, Ford Motor Company expanded its agricultural holdings when it purchased the Sperry-New Holland implement line from Sperry Corporation, and named their agricultural division Ford New Holland Inc. The following year, Versatile was purchased, giving Ford a complete agricultural lineup. In 1988 Ford Motor Company sold 80% of Ford-New Holland Inc. to Fiat, and in 1991 Fiat acquired the remaining 20%, with the agreement to stop using the Ford brand by 2000. By 1999, Fiat had discontinued the use of both its own and the Ford name, and united them both under the New Holland brand.

== Buses ==
- 70 (1936–1937)
- 81-B (1937–1938)
- 91-B (1938–1939)
- 09-B (1939–1940)
- 19-B (1940–1941)
- 29-B (1941–1942)
- 49-B (1944)
- 59-B (1945–1947)
- 69-B (1946–1947)
- 79-B (1945–1947)

School bus - for North American market

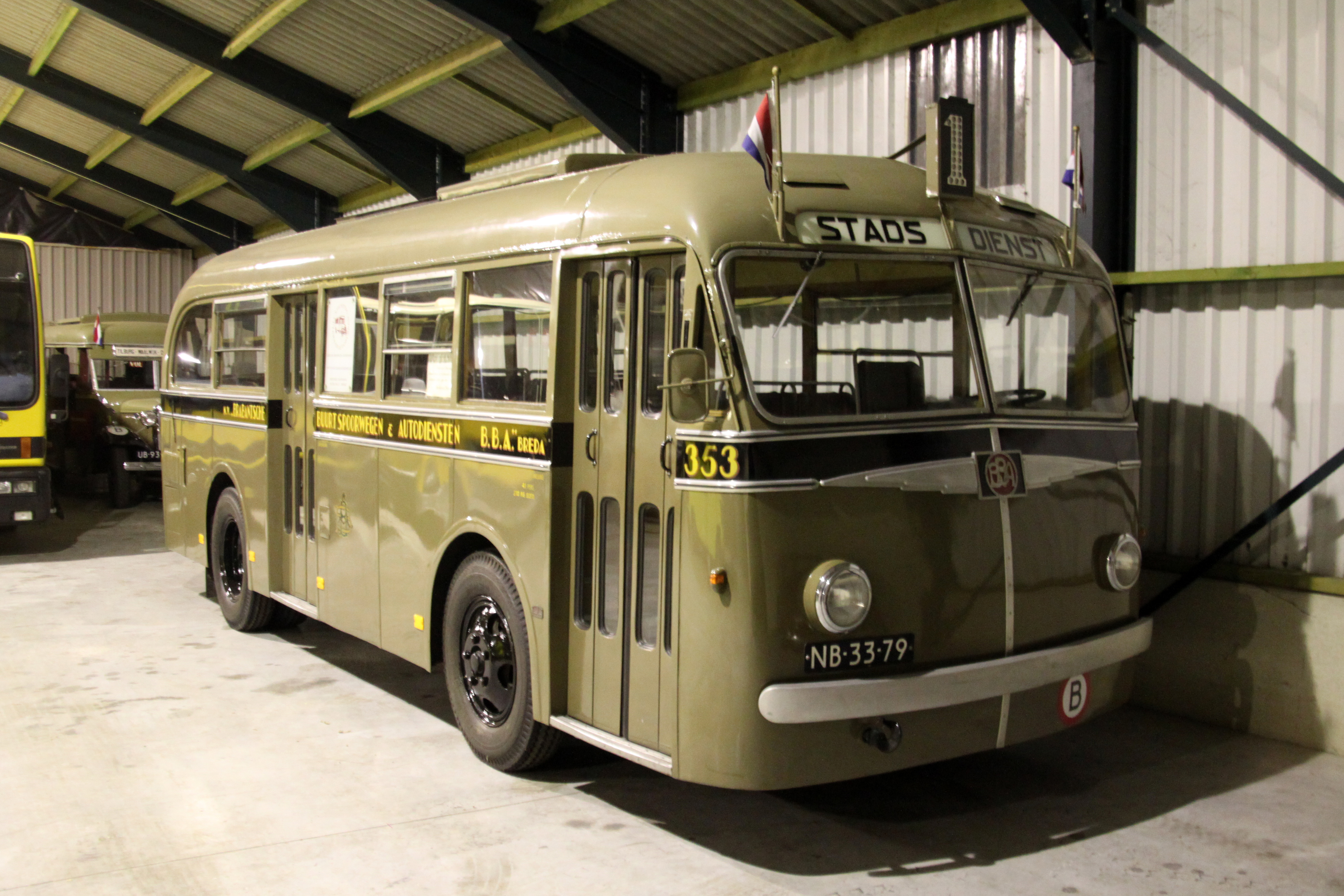
Transit bus

- Ford Transit Bus (1936–1947)
- Various third party manufactures use Ford E-series and F-series chassis to build mini school buses used in Canada and the United States:
  - Ford Minibus using F450 chassis
  - Ford Minibus using E350 (formerly Econoline 350)
  - Ford E450 Super Duty minibus
  - Ford MB series minibus - IV models 100, 100A, 200 and 200C Super Duty
  - Ford MBC series buses IV models 200, 200C, 300, 300D, 800
- Ford B-Series Type C conventional chassis used by third party manufactures to build full size school buses for North American market

Commercial bus

- Ford Specialty Trolley - classic North American trolley car shell with Ford truck chassis; used as tourist shuttle buses

Transit/suburban bus

- Ford G997
- Ford R-Series - for European market 1960s to 1980s
- Ford Trader
- Ford Hawke
- Ford ET7 with Casha bodywork
- Ford 19B, 29B
- Ford 72B
- Ford ET7 Aqualina

== Military ==
Ford was a military contractor for North American and European clients during World War I and II:

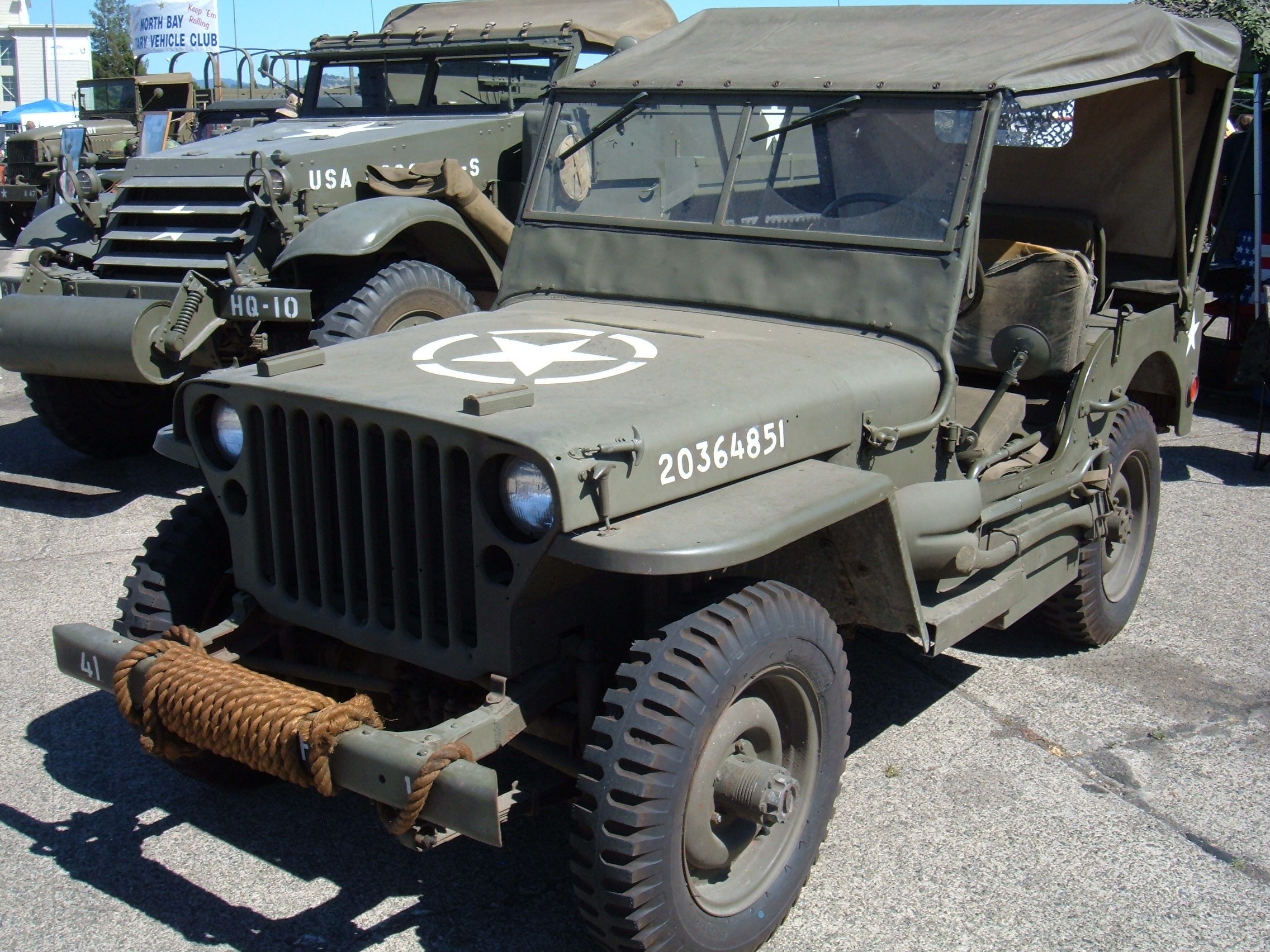
Ford GP (Willys Jeep)

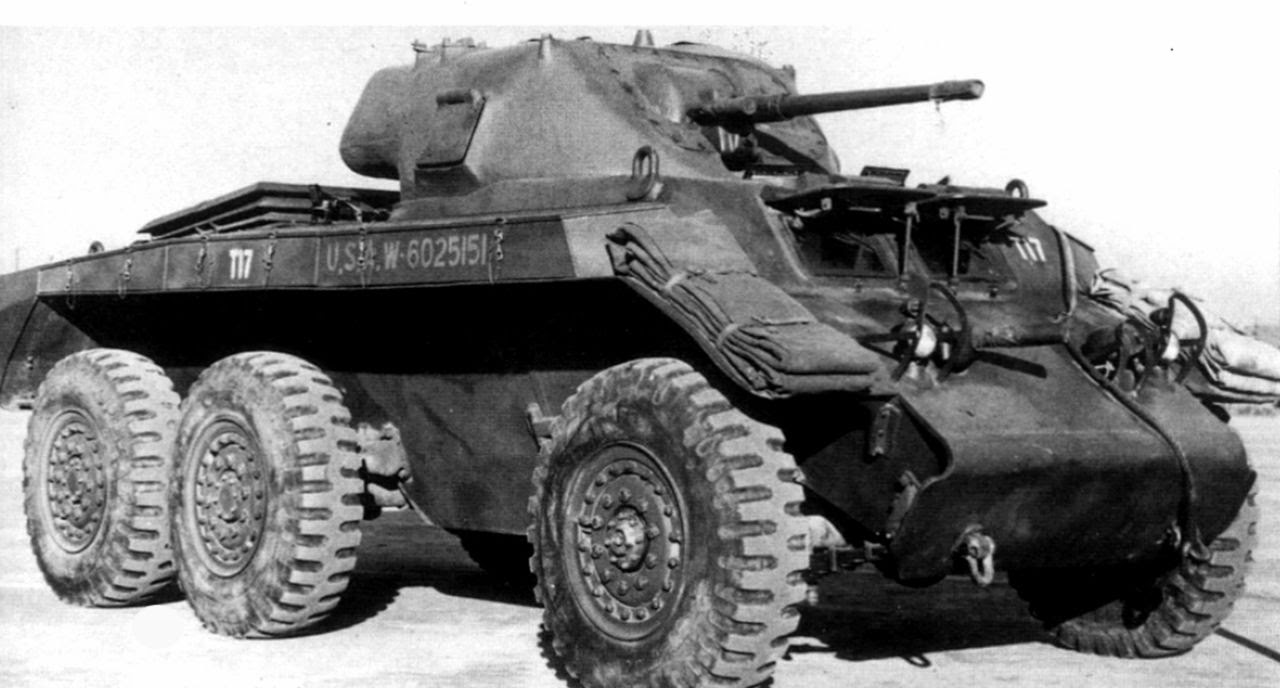
T17-Deerhound

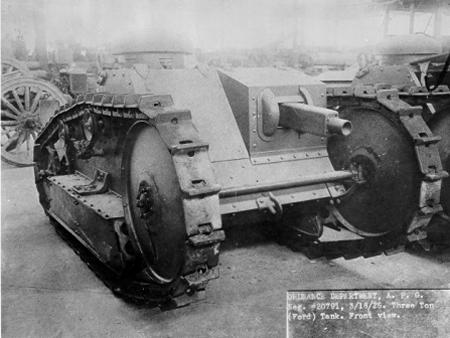
M1918 tank

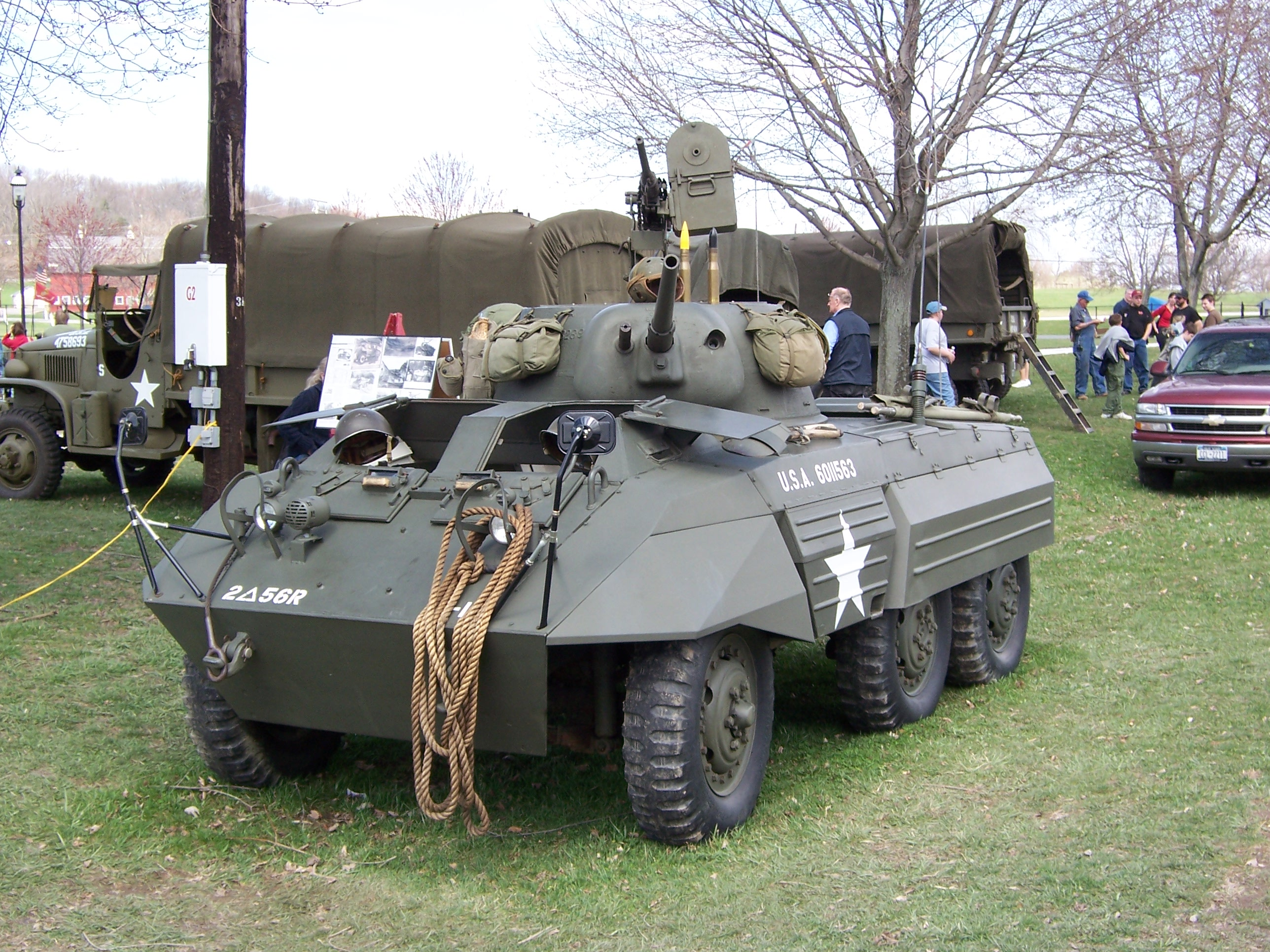
M8 Greyhound

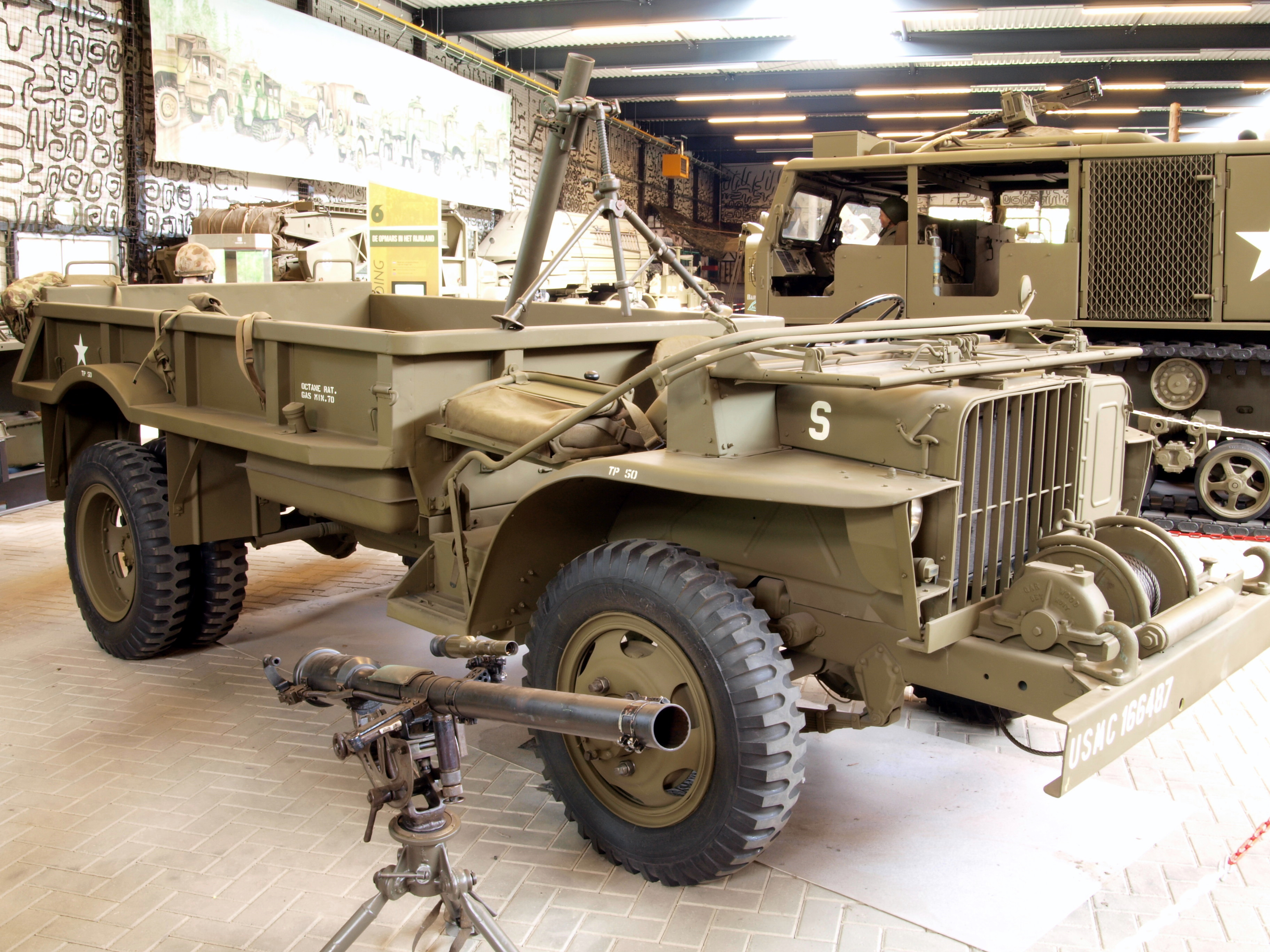
GTB jeep

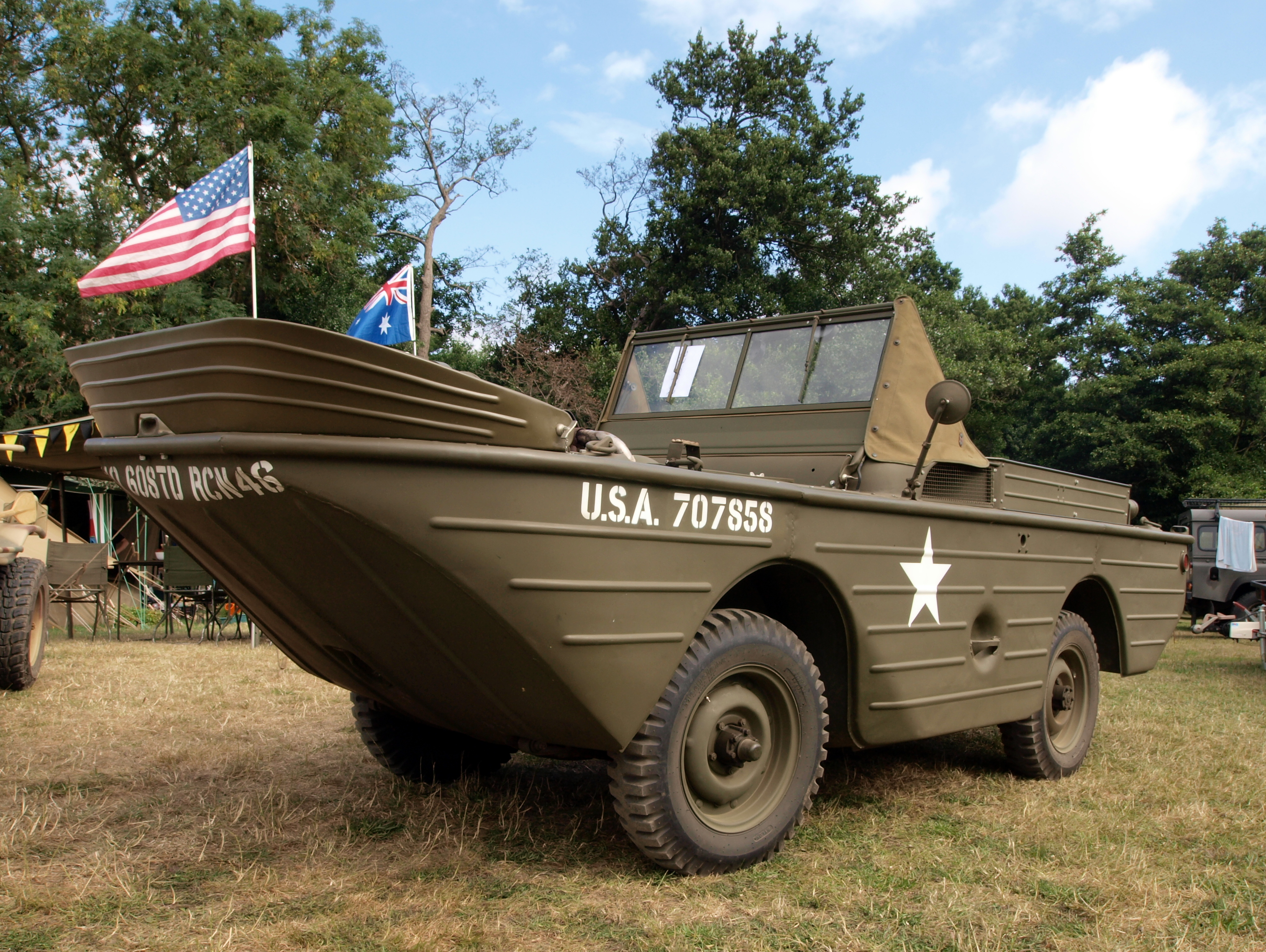
GPA amphibious

- 1917 Ford Model-T - World War I ambulance
- M1918 (Note: World War I light tank used Model-T engines.)
- Universal Carrier MK. I and MK. II
- T16 Universal Carrier
- T17 Deerhound armored car
- M8 Greyhound armored car
- Bomb service truck - based on Model 19F light truck
- GTB ("Burma Jeep") (Note: Medium duty truck, 1 1/2 Ton 4X4; used for cargo and other tasks by USN and US Marine Corps during World War II.)
- GP / GPW (Note: The MB by Willys-Overland. Limited pre-production version of 1/4 Ton 4x4. Included 4-wheel steer version.) (1941–1945)
- GPA (Note: amphibious Ford variant of Willys MB during World War II.)
- M38CDN
- M38A1CDN
- M151 (jeep)
- M656 (Note: Standard Five-ton truck in April 1966.)
- Many versions of trucks and cars built by Ford in Canada for military during WWII. e.g. Ford F8, F15, F15A, F30, F60S, F60L, FAT, C11ADF etc.
- Ford produced multiple types of trucks in Germany for military during WWII. e.g. Ford G917T, G987T, G997T and G987T

== Concept and show cars ==
Note: Some cars are also referred to with "Ford Ghia" or just "Ghia" in the name, as a reference to the design studio.

- Ford 021C (1999)
- Ford 24.7 Coupe (2000)
- Ford 24.7 Pickup (2000)
- Ford 24.7 Wagon (2000)
- Ford 4-Trac (2006)
- Ford 427 (2003)
- Ford AC (1982)
- Ford Adrenalin (1996)
- Ford Aerostar (1984)
- Ford Aerovan (1981, 1982)
- Ford AFV (Alternative Fuel Vehicle) (1982)
- Ford Airstream (2007)
- Ford Allegro (1963)
- Ford Allegro II (1967)
- Ford Alpe (1996)
- Ford APV (1984)
- Ford Arioso (1994)
- Ford Atlas (2013)
- Ford Avantgarde (1981)
- Ford Aurora (1964)
- Ford Aurora II (1969)
- Ford B-Max (2011)
- Ford Barchetta (1983)
- Ford Bordinat Cobra (1965)
- Ford Brezza (1982)
- Ford Boss Bronco (1992)
- Ford Bronco (2004)
- Ford Bronco Badlands Sasquatch 2-door (2021)
- Ford Bronco + Filson Wildland Fire Rig (2020)
- Ford Bronco DM-1 (1988)
- Ford Bronco Dune Duster (1966–1968)
- Ford Outback Bronco (1994)
- Ford Bronco Wildflower (1971)
- Ford Bronco Montana Lobo (1981)
- Ford Carousel (1972)
- Ford Cirrus (1972)
- Ford Cisitalia coupe (1952)
- Ford City Star (1970)
- Ford Cobra 230 ME (1986)
- Ford Cockpit (1982)
- Ford Coins (1974)
- Ford Comuta (1967)
- Ford Connecta (1992)
- Ford Contour (1991)
- Ford Corrida (1978)
- Ford Cougar (1956)
- Ford Cougar 406 (1962)
- Ford Cougar II (1963)
- Ford Courier F1 (1998)
- Ford DePaolo (1958)
- Ford Desert Excursion (2000)
- Ford e.go (2000, Vietnam)
- Ford Econocar (1982)
- Ford EcoSport (2012)
- Ford Econoline Apartment (1966)
- Ford Econoline Chicane (1996)
- Ford Econoline Kilimanjaro (1970)
- Ford Edge (2014)
- Ford Eltec (1985)
- Ford Equator (2001, 2005)
- Ford Escape Hybrid (2003)
- Ford Escort (2013)
- Ford ESV (Experimental Safety Vehicle) (1972)
- Ford EVent (1994)
- Ford Evos (2011)
- Ford EX (2001)
- Ford EXP II (1981)
- Ford Expedition Everest (2002)
- Ford Explorer America (2008)
- Ford Explorer Desk Drive (1990)
- Ford Explorer Drifter (1992)
- Ford Explorer S2RV (2003)
- Ford Explorer Sportsman (2001)
- Ford Explorer Sport-Trac (2005)
- Ford Explorer Sport-Trac Adrenalin (2005)
- Ford Explorer Surf (1990)
- Ford Explorer SUV (1973)
- Ford Urban Explorer (2000)
- Ford F-150 Lightning Rod (2001)
- Ford F-150 Street (1990)
- Ford F-150 SVT Lightning (2003)
- Ford F-250 Super Chief (2006)
- Ford FAB1 (modified Thunderbird)
- Ford Faction (2003)
- Ford Fairlane (2005)
- Ford Fiera (1968)
- Ford Fiesta Bebop (1990)
- Ford Fiesta Fantasy (1978)
- Ford Fiesta RS (2004)
- Ford Fiesta ST (2011)
- Ford Fiesta Tuareg (1978)
- Ford Fiesta Urba (1989)
- Ford Flair (1982)
- Ford Flashback (1975)
- Ford Flux (2006)
- Ford Focus (1992, 1998, 2004)
- Ford Focus C-Max (2002)
- Ford Focus FCV (2001)
- Ford Focus H2RV (2003)
- Ford Focus MA (2002)
- Ford Focus Vignale (2004)
- Ford Forty-Nine (2001)
- Ford Freestyle FX (2003)
- Ford FX-Atmos (1954)
- Ford Galaxie GT A Go-Go (1966)
- Ford GloCar (2003)
- Ford Granada Altair (1980)
- Ford GTK (1979)
- Ford GT-P (1966)
- Ford GT40 (2002)
- Ford GT70 (1971)
- Ford GT80 (1978)
- Ford GT90 (1995)
- Ford GTX1 (2005)
- Ford Gyron (1961)
- Ford HFX Aerostar (1987)
- Ford HySeries Edge (2007)
- Ford Indigo (1996)
- Ford Interceptor (2007)
- Ford Iosis (2005)
- Ford Iosis X (2006)
- Ford Iosis MAX (2009)
- Ford IXG (1960)
- Ford La Galaxie (1958)
- Ford La Tosca (1955)
- Ford Libre (1998)
- Ford LTD Black Pearl (1966)
- Ford LTD Berline I (1971)
- Ford LTD Berline II (1972)
- Ford LTD Experimental Safety Vehicle (1973)
- Ford Lucano (1978)
- Ford Lynx (1996)
- Ford MA (2002)
- Ford Mach I Levacar (1959)
- Ford Mach 2 (1967)
- Ford Magic Cruiser (1966)
- Ford Manx (1975)
- Ford Maverick Runabout (1970)
- Ford Maverick Estate Coupe (1970)
- Ford Maverick LTD (1972)
- Ford Maxima (1954)
- Ford Maya (1984)
- Ford Maya II ES (1985)
- Ford Maya II EM (1985)
- Ford Megastar (1977)
- Ford Megastar II (1978)
- Ford Mexico (1956)
- Ford Microsport (1978)
- Ford Mighty F-350 Tonka (2002)
- Ford MiniMax (1976)
- Ford Model U (2003)
- Ford Muroc (1950)
- Ford Mustang I (1962)
- Ford Mustang II (1963)
- Ford Mustang II Sportiva (1974)
- Ford Mustang III (1978)
- Ford Mustang Fastback/Convertible (2004)
- Ford Mustang Ghia Vignale (1984)
- Ford Mustang Giugiaro (2006)
- Ford Mustang IMSA (1980)
- Ford Mustang Mach I (1965)
- Ford Mustang Mach II (1970)
- Ford Mustang Mach III (1993)
- Ford Mustang Milano (1970)
- Ford Mustang RSX (1979)
- Ford Mustang PPG (1984)
- Ford Mustela II (1973)
- Ford Mystere (1955)
- Ford Navarre (1980)
- Ford Nucleon (1958)
- Ford Optim (1981)
- Ford P2000 (1999)
- Ford Pinto Sportiva (1973)
- Ford Plastic Car (1941)
- Ford Pockar (1981)
- Ford Powerforce (1997)
- Ford Powerstroke (1994)
- Ford Prima (1976)
- Ford Probe I (1979)
- Ford Probe II (1980)
- Ford Probe III (1981)
- Ford Probe IV (1982)
- Ford Probe V (1985)
- Ford Prodigy (2000)
- Ford Profile (1994)
- Ford Prototype (Colani) (1989)
- Ford Puma ST160 (1999)
- Ford Quicksilver (1982)
- Ford R7 (2002)
- Ford Ranchero Scrambler (1969)
- Ford Ranger II (1967)
- Ford Ranger III (1968)
- Ford Ranger Baja Baby (1997)
- Ford Ranger Force 5 (1991)
- Ford Ranger Jukebox (1993)
- Ford Ranger Max (2008)
- Ford Ranger Powerforce (1999)
- Ford Ranger Sandcourt (1997)
- Ford Ranger Sea Splash/Sky Splash (1994)
- Ford Reflex (2006)
- Ford Rox (1997)
- Ford S2RV (Smart Safe Research Vehicle) (2002)
- Ford SAV (2005)
- Ford Saetta (1996)
- Ford Saguaro (1988)
- Ford Santa Fe (1998)
- Ford Seattle-ite XXI (1962)
- Ford Selene II (1962)
- Ford Shelby Cobra (2004)
- Ford Shelby GR-1 (2004)
- Ford SHO-Star (1995)
- Ford Shoccc Wave (1990)
- Ford Shuttler (1981)
- Ford Splash (1988)
- Ford Sportiva II (1974)
- Ford Start (2001)
- Ford StreetKa (2000)
- Ford Surf (1990)
- Ford sub-B (1993)
- Ford Super Chief (2006)
- Ford Super Cobra (1969)
- Ford Super Crewzer (1998)
- Ford Super Gnat (1981)
- Ford Synergy 2010 (1996)
- Ford Synthesis 2010 (1993)
- Ford SYNUS (2005)
- Ford Syrtis (1953)
- Ford Taunus Alpencoupe (1967)
- Ford Taurus Blackbird (1981)
- Ford Techna (1968)
- Ford TH!NK
- Ford Thunderbird Italien (1963)
- Ford Thunderbird Golden Palomino (1964)
- Ford Thunderbird Town Landau (1965)
- Ford Thunderbird Saturn I (1968)
- Ford Thunderbird Saturn II (1969)
- Ford Thunderbird PPG (1984)
- Ford Thunderbird (1999)
- Ford Thunderbird Sports Roadster (2001)
- Ford Thunderbird SuperCharged (2003)
- Ford Topaz (1982)
- Ford Torino Machete Style I (1968)
- Ford Torino Machete Style II (1969)
- Ford Transit Connect Family One (2009)
- Ford Transit Connect Taxi (2008)
- Ford Tridon (1971)
- Ford Trio (1983)
- Ford Triton (1995)
- Ford Turbine Truck (1964)
- Ford Turing Ka (1998)
- Ford Twister (1963)
- Ford Urban Car (1975)
- Ford Urby (1985)
- Ford Vega (1953)
- Ford Vertrek (2011)
- Ford Verve (2007–2008)
- Ford Via (1989)
- Ford Vignale TSX-4 (1984)
- Ford Vignale TSX-6 (1986)
- Ford Visos (2003)
- Ford Vivace (1996)
- Ford Volante (1958)
- Ford X-100 (1953)
- Ford X-1000 (1958)
- Ford X-2000 (1958)
- Ford XP Bordinat Cobra (1965)
- Ford Zag (1990)
- Ford Zig (1990)

== See also ==
- List of Mercury vehicles
- List of Lincoln vehicles
- Edsel
- Frontenac
- Merkur
- Meteor
- Monarch
- List of Ford engines
- List of Ford platforms
