= Ford Cirrus concept car =

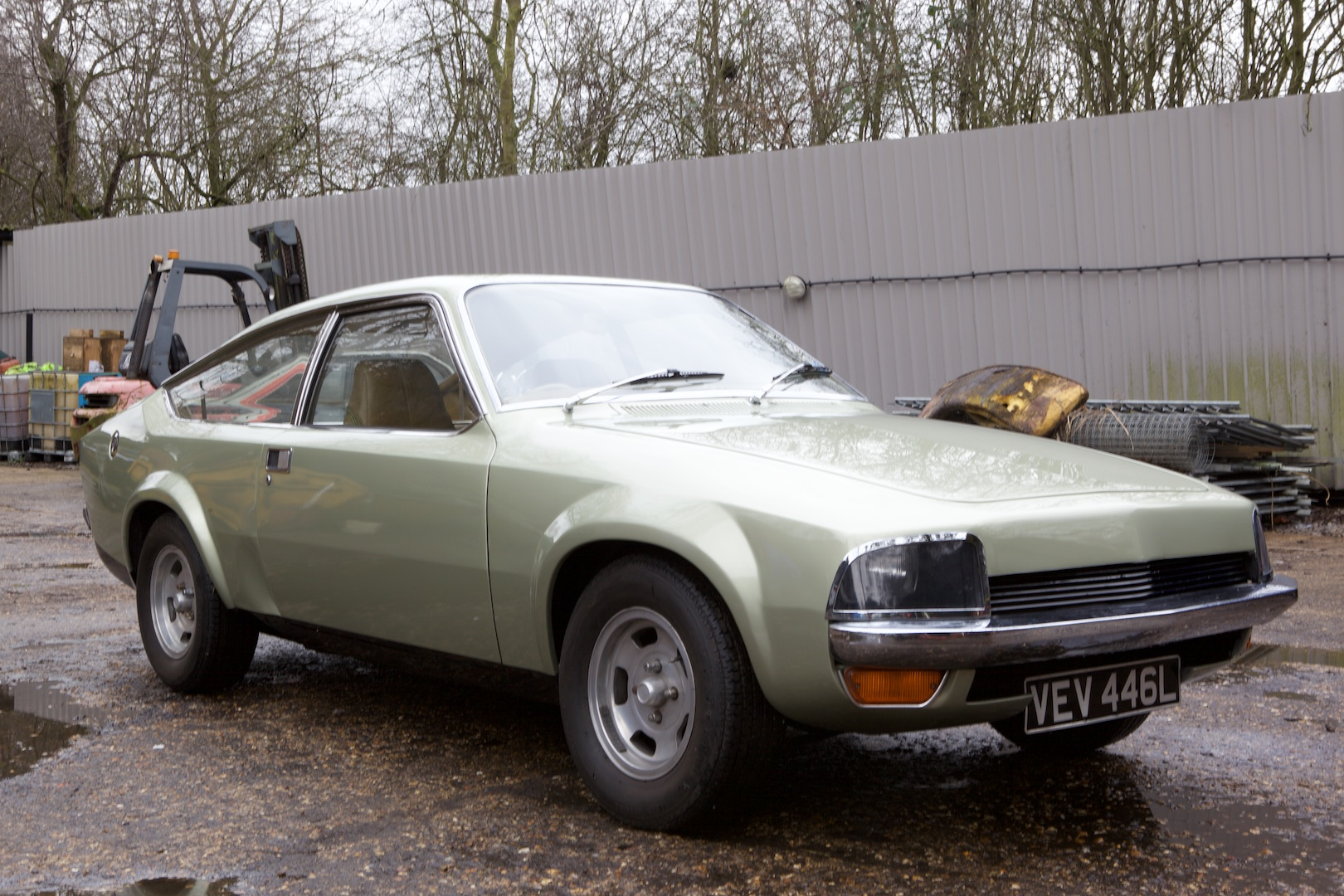
Ford Cirrus

The Ford Cirrus is a concept car based on a production Ford Escort RS1600 supplied by Ford of Britain and restyled by Woodall-Nicholson Ltd. It was first shown in 1972 at the Earl's Court Motor Show. The Cirrus was a result of the IBCAM British Styling Competition 1970, run by the Daily Telegraph Magazine. The prize, to have the car made in real life, £400 and two return tickets to East Africa and a stay in the Inter-Continental hotel Nairobi. At the time, the car was reported to have cost £25,000 to build.

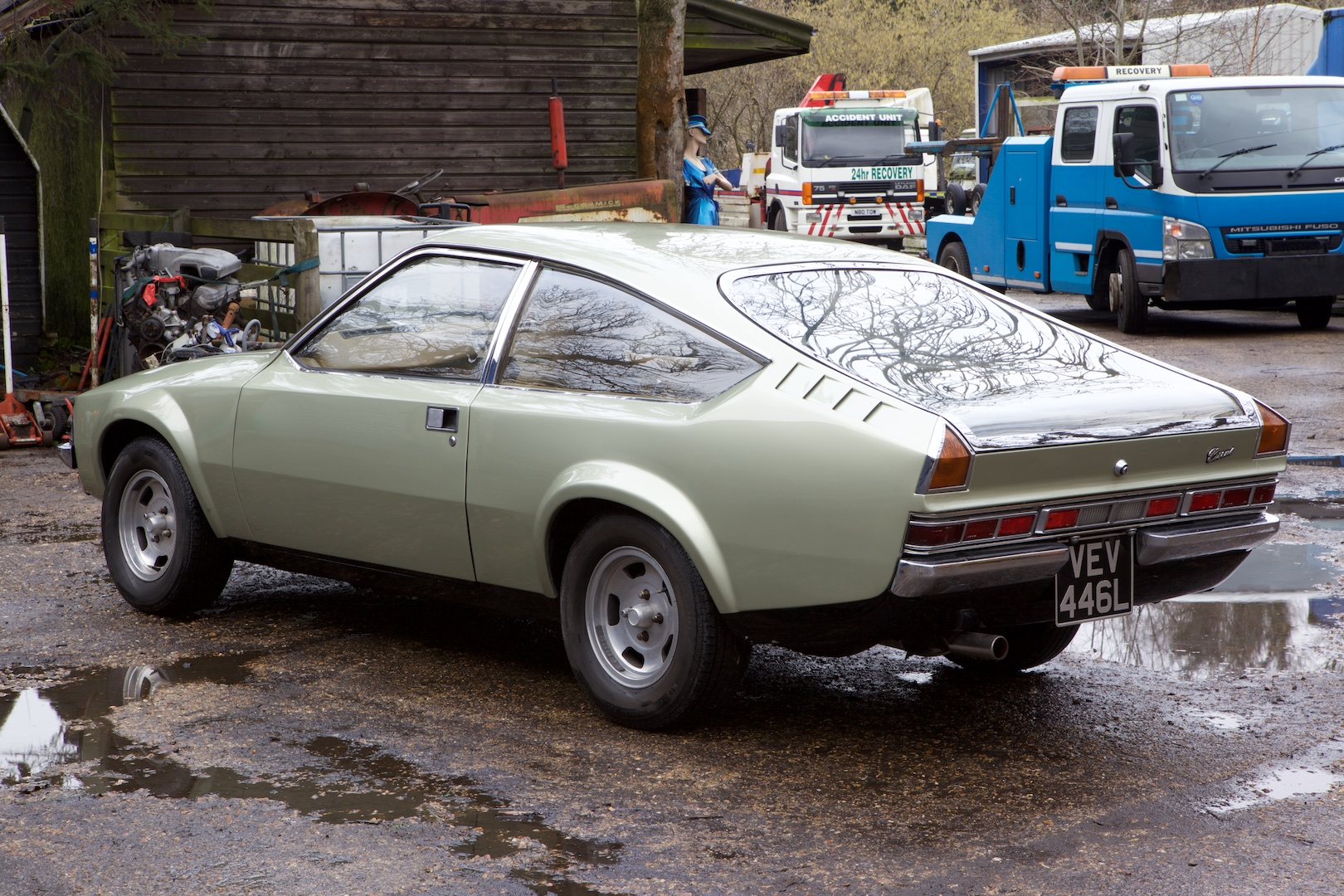
Ford Cirrus rear view

The winning design was by Michael Moore, an existing automotive designer for Chrysler UK. The Cirrus is based on the mechanical components of a Ford Escort RS1600 supplied by Ford of Britain. This was stated beforehand, allowing designers to work around it approximate size and allow bonnet heights for the Macpherson strut suspension.

The design brief was for a 2 door 2+2 car, ready for 1975, the job of building such a radical design went to Woodall-Nicholson Ltd of Halifax, a well established and leading coachbuilder of the time. Paint was supplied and applied by Berger Refinishers in a special colour, sparkle green gold metallic in Viton cellulose.

The build was project managed by G F Mosely of IBCAM, who had experience of coachbuilding. The following year Mosely also project managed the build of the Austin Maxi-based Aquila.

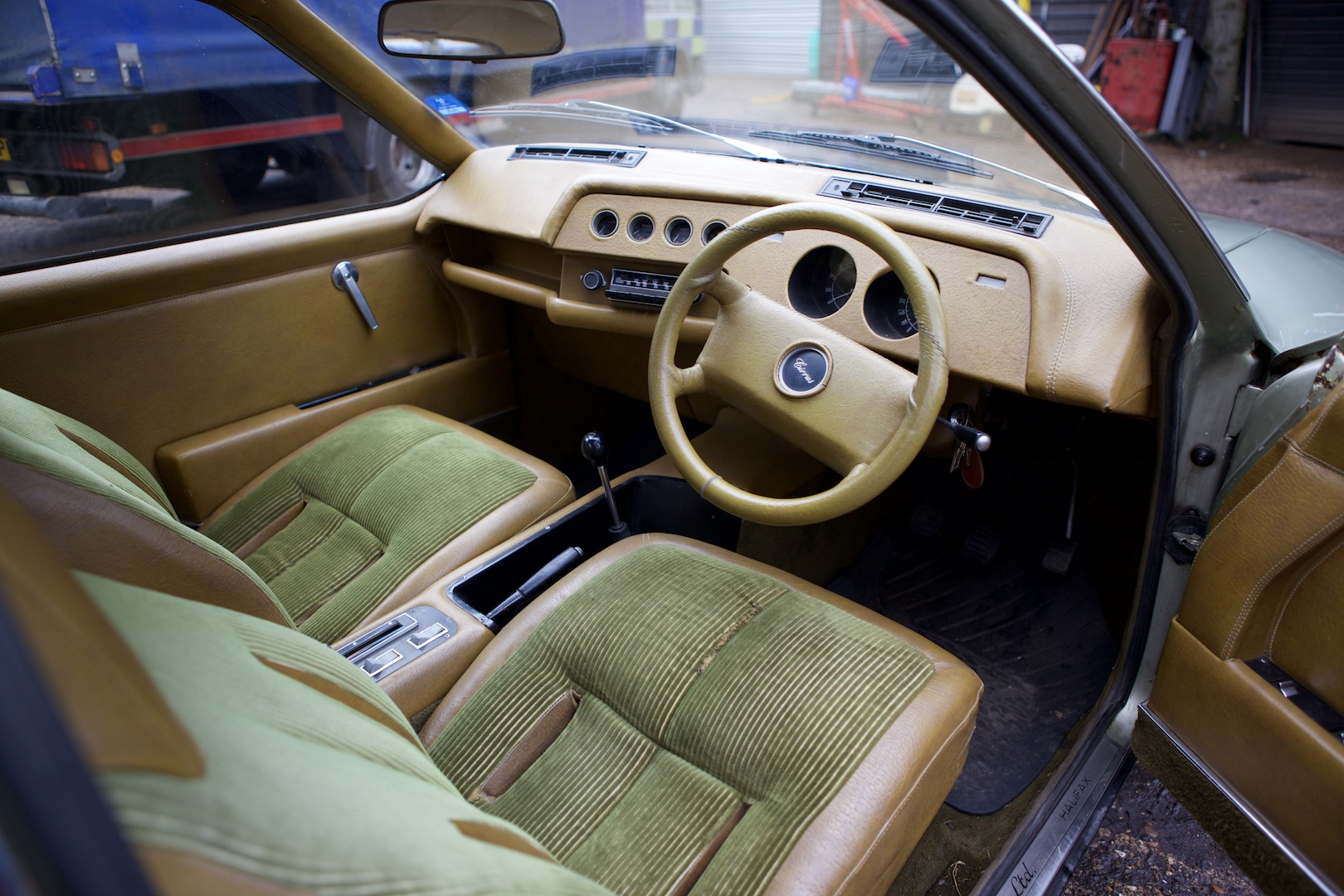
Interior

Michael Moore states his influences for the design were Citroën, certain points of De Tomaso and other Italian manufacturers as no British cars at the time has aero- dynamic headlights. Parts from existing manufactured cars appear the Cirrus, namely Vauxhall Viva tail lights and Morris Marina door handles, though most pars, including the all steel paneling and Triplex Safety Glass were custom made for the project as close to the original designs as possible.

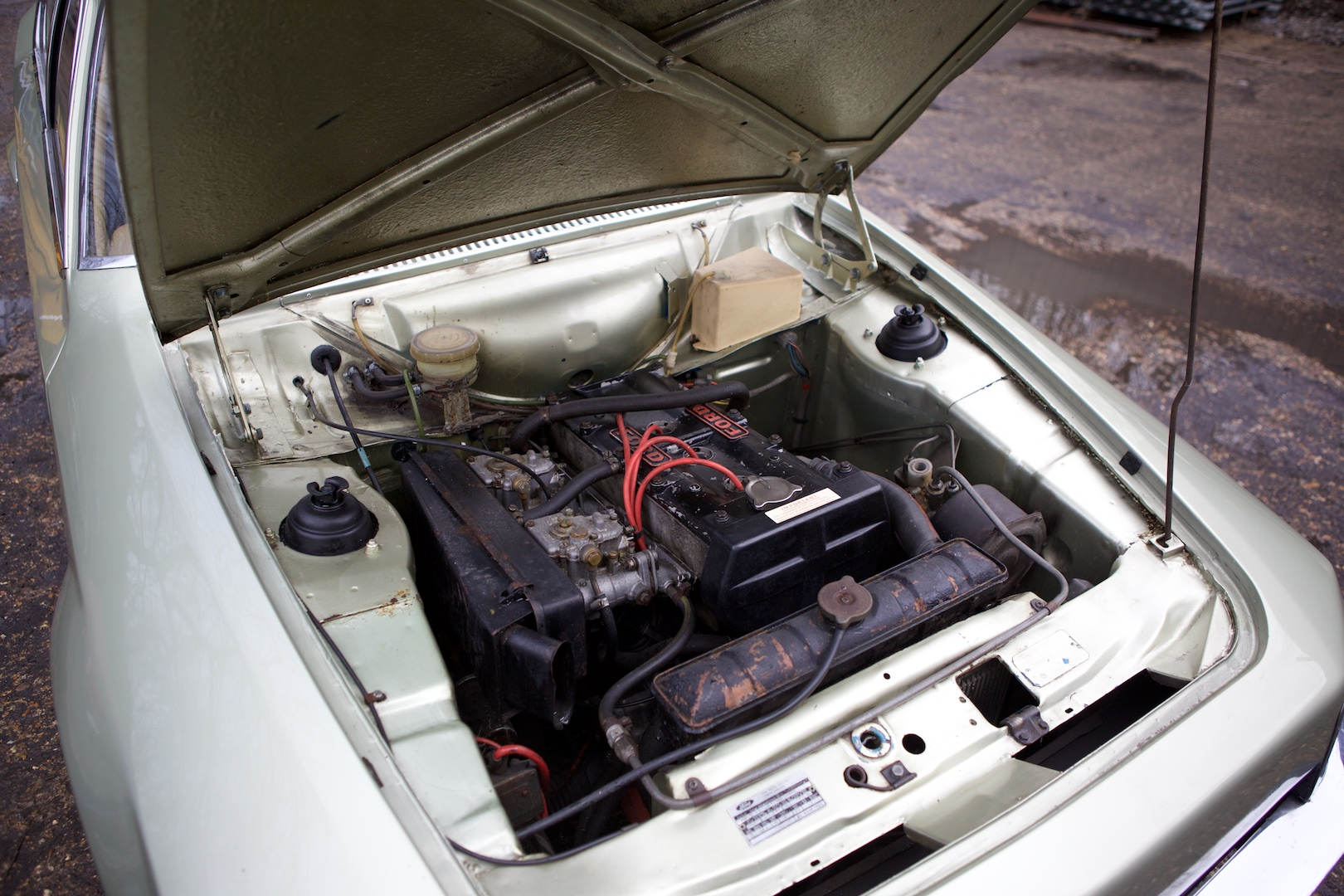
Ford Cirrus Twin Cam Engine
