= Ford P100 =

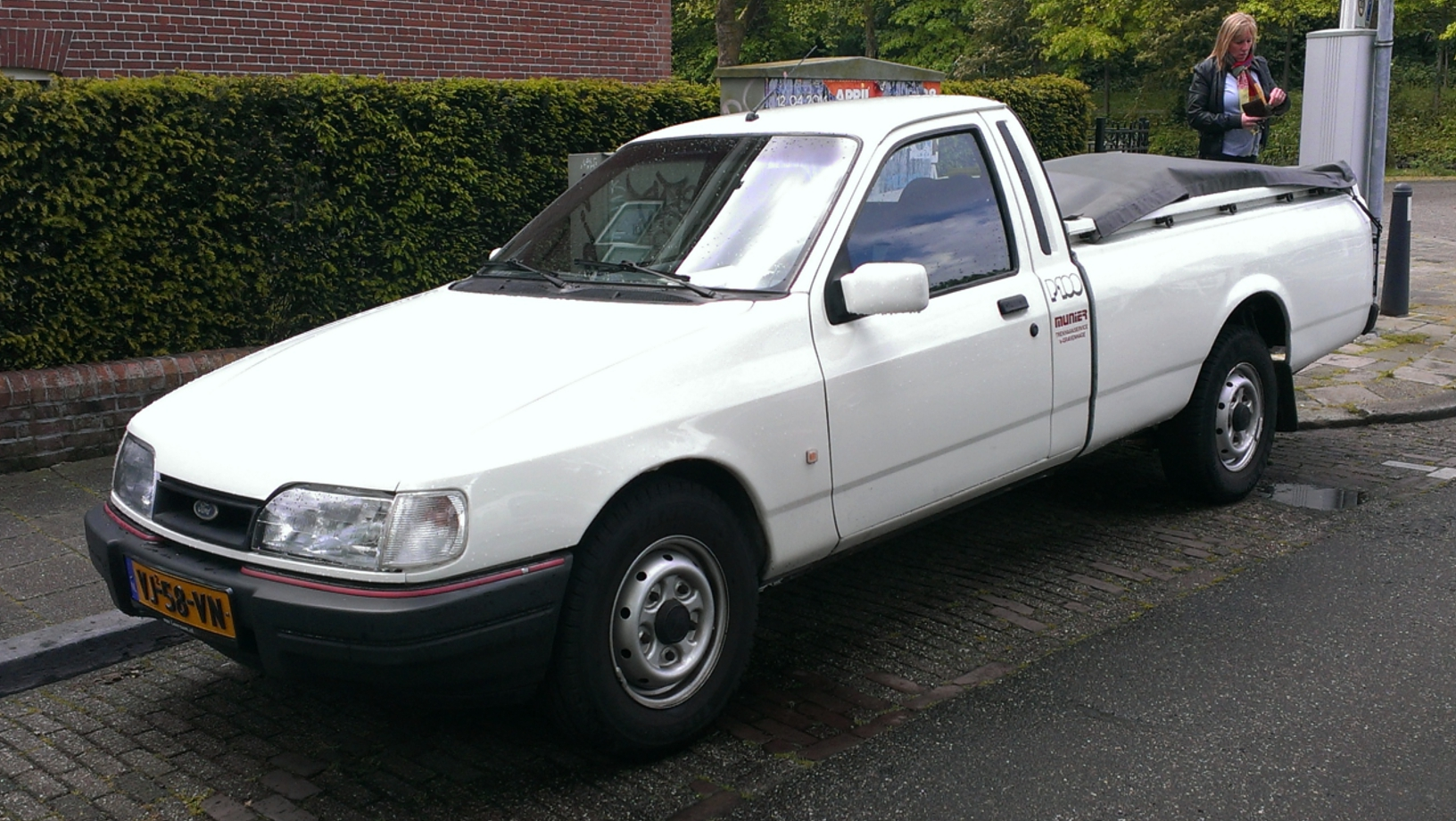
- 1990 Ford P100 Pickup

Overview
- Manufacturer: Ford
- Also called: Ford Cortina Pickup (1971–1982); Ford 1-Tonner
- Production: 1971–1995
- Assembly: South Africa: Port Elizabeth (FMCSA); Portugal: Azambuja; Turkey: Istanbul (Ford Otosan)

Body and chassis
- Body style: 2-door pickup
- Layout: FR layout
- Related: Ford Taunus TC; Ford Cortina; Ford Sierra

Chronology
- Successor: Ford Courier (South Africa); Ford Transit Connect; Ford Ranger

The Ford P100 is a coupé utility that was built by Ford from 1971 to 1995, initially in South Africa, and later Portugal. It was based on medium-sized Ford passenger cars, originally the Cortina/Taunus and from 1988 the Sierra. Initially marketed as the Ford Cortina Pickup, the P100 name was adopted in 1982. The P-100 name had previously been used on a small North American panel van in the 1960s.

== Taunus/Cortina-based model ==
The P100 is a coupé utility, introduced in South Africa in 1971, based on the Ford Taunus TC/Ford Cortina Mk3. Initially marketed as the Ford Cortina Pickup, its overall bodywork closely followed that of the Cortina. The cab used the doors of the Cortina two-door sedan models, giving it a lengthy, yet truncated look, due to the use of a vertical rear window and B-pillar. The rear tray could be had as a wellside, styled with the Cortina MkIII estate's tail lights, or fitted with a flatdeck or purpose built body. A fibreglass canopy was offered as an option. It soon proved a popular seller in its home market of South Africa.

The bodywork was changed for 1977, to correspond with that of the Ford Taunus TC2/Cortina MkIV. The cab was redesigned, using the shorter front doors from the MkIV four-door models. A further change occurred for 1980, when the front sheetmetal and revised grille from the Taunus TC3/Cortina MkV was introduced. The Ford 1-Tonner name was used in the South African market. From 1986 the Mazda-based Ford Courier replaced the P100 pick-up in South Africa. The Courier was available with the Ford Essex V6 through to April 2000.

From 1982 the P100 name was adopted, and the model was exported from South Africa to Europe. For Europe, the chassis and tray were lengthened, whilst in South Africa it was available in both short wheelbase and long wheelbase variants. The P100 was released to Europe in Mk5 form, just as the parent Cortina MkV was being replaced by the Sierra. Ford had considered selling a rebadged Mazda pickup, which would have been lower priced, but rejected this on political grounds as there was a lot of fear over Japanese imports at this time. Ford UK considered being made in Apartheid South Africa as less of a liability than being made in Japan, and also managed to achieve 35 percent local parts content. Country of origin and outdated styling proved to be no effect on sales however, with the P100 continuing in its Cortina Mk5 based form until 1988. In 1986 the "hi cap" was released with a taller roof and door tops and a more upright windscreen specific to the last of the Cortina-based P100s.

Beginning in 1991, Turkey's Otosan also produced a P100 variant. This has a separate bed and uses the shorter doors from the four-door sedan to achieve parts commonality, as Otosan did not build any other two-door models. The Otosan P100 is based on the Ford Taunus TC, which was built in Turkey in sedan form between 1984 and 1994. The Otosan P100 was produced until 1996.

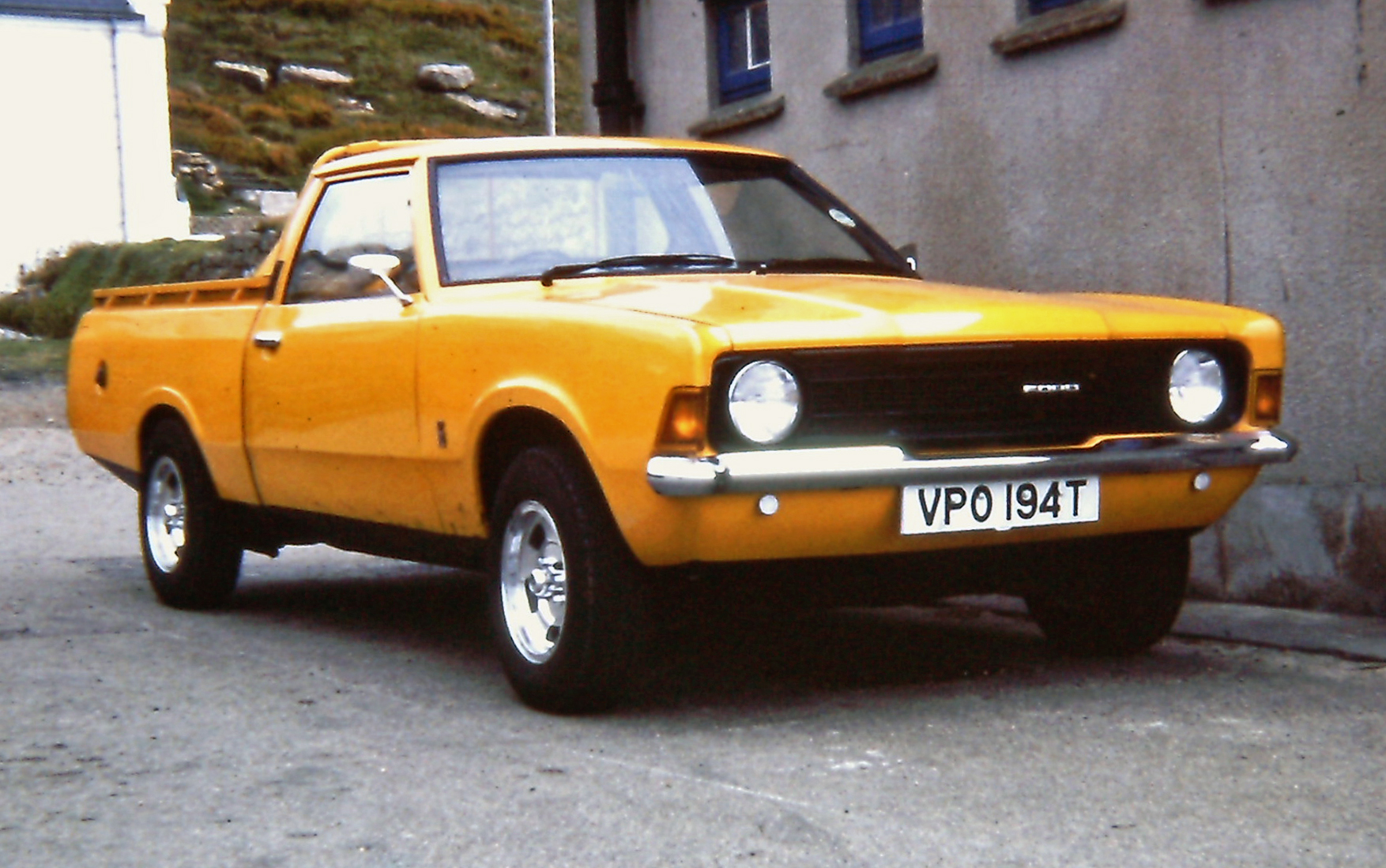
Original 1971-1977 style Cortina Pick-up, MkIII design

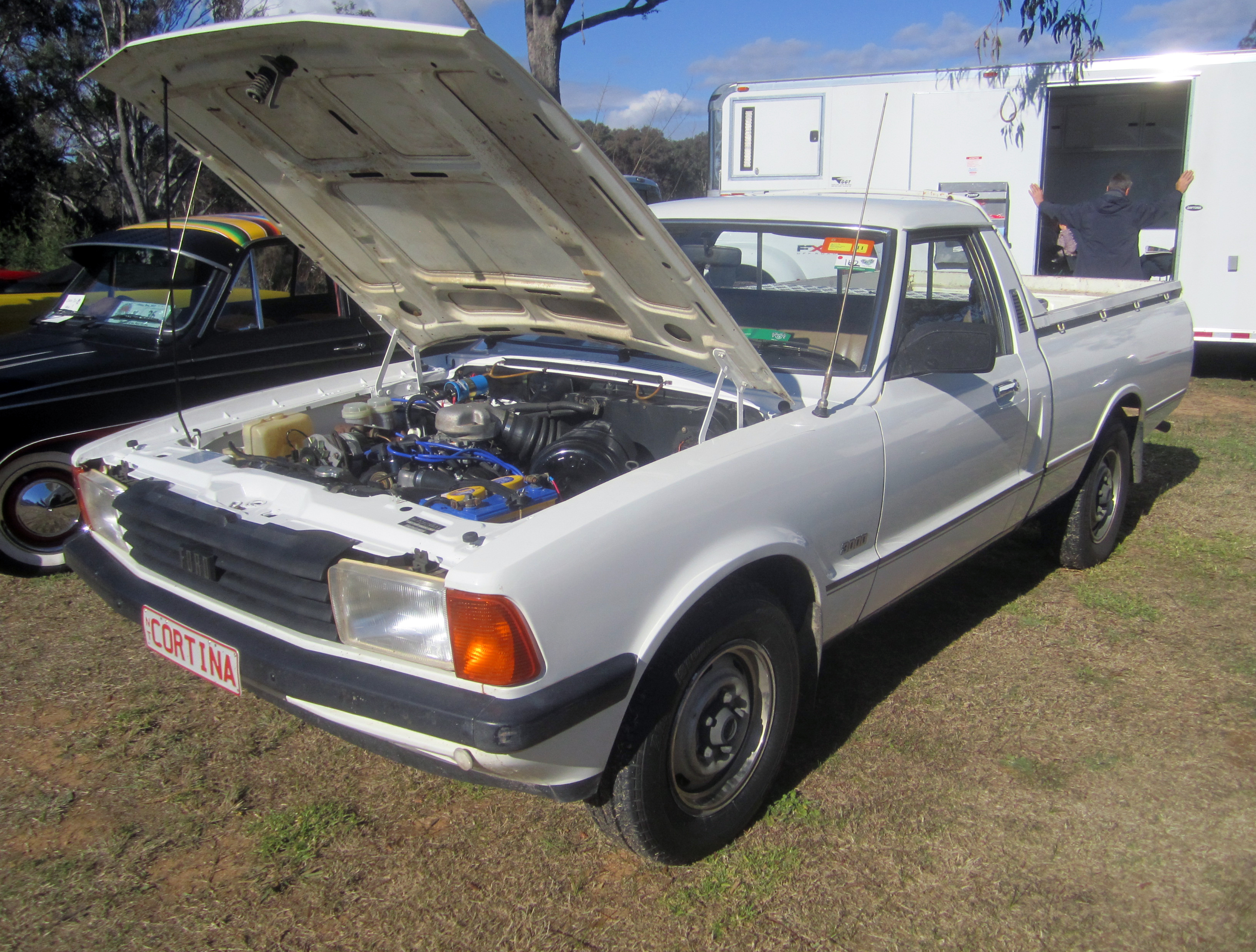
1981 Ford 1-Tonner – (Ford Cortina based)

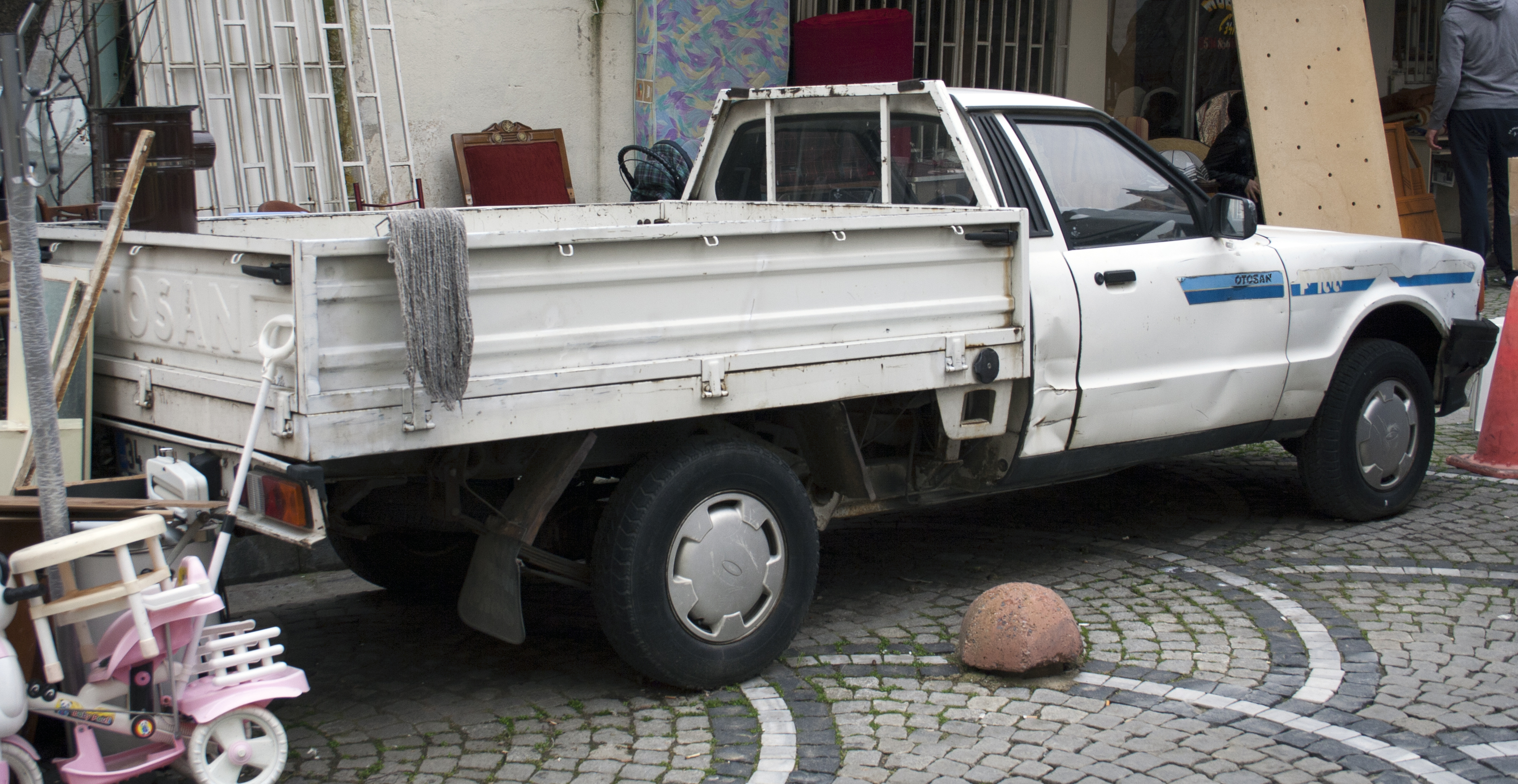
Otosan P100 - (Ford Taunus based)

== Sierra-based model ==
In late-1987, for the 1988 model year, the P100 was re-bodied with a new Ford Sierra-based cab. Engine choices were originally the Sierra's 2.0 litre "Pinto" carburetted petrol engine, with a 1.8 L turbo-diesel following soon thereafter. The range was now built in Portugal for the European market, to a design set out by Ford UK. It proved a strong seller, particularly on the UK market. The later P100's petrol engine, while still a 2.0-litre Pinto unit, differed from the units installed in the passenger Sierra and Granada models in being a low compression version of the 205 block Pinto. The turbocharged Cosworth engine is based on this block. Single choke carburettors coupled with the lower compression to raise torque whilst lowering maximum power, which was now at 74 PS (54 kW; 73 hp).

Production of the P100 ceased in 1995.

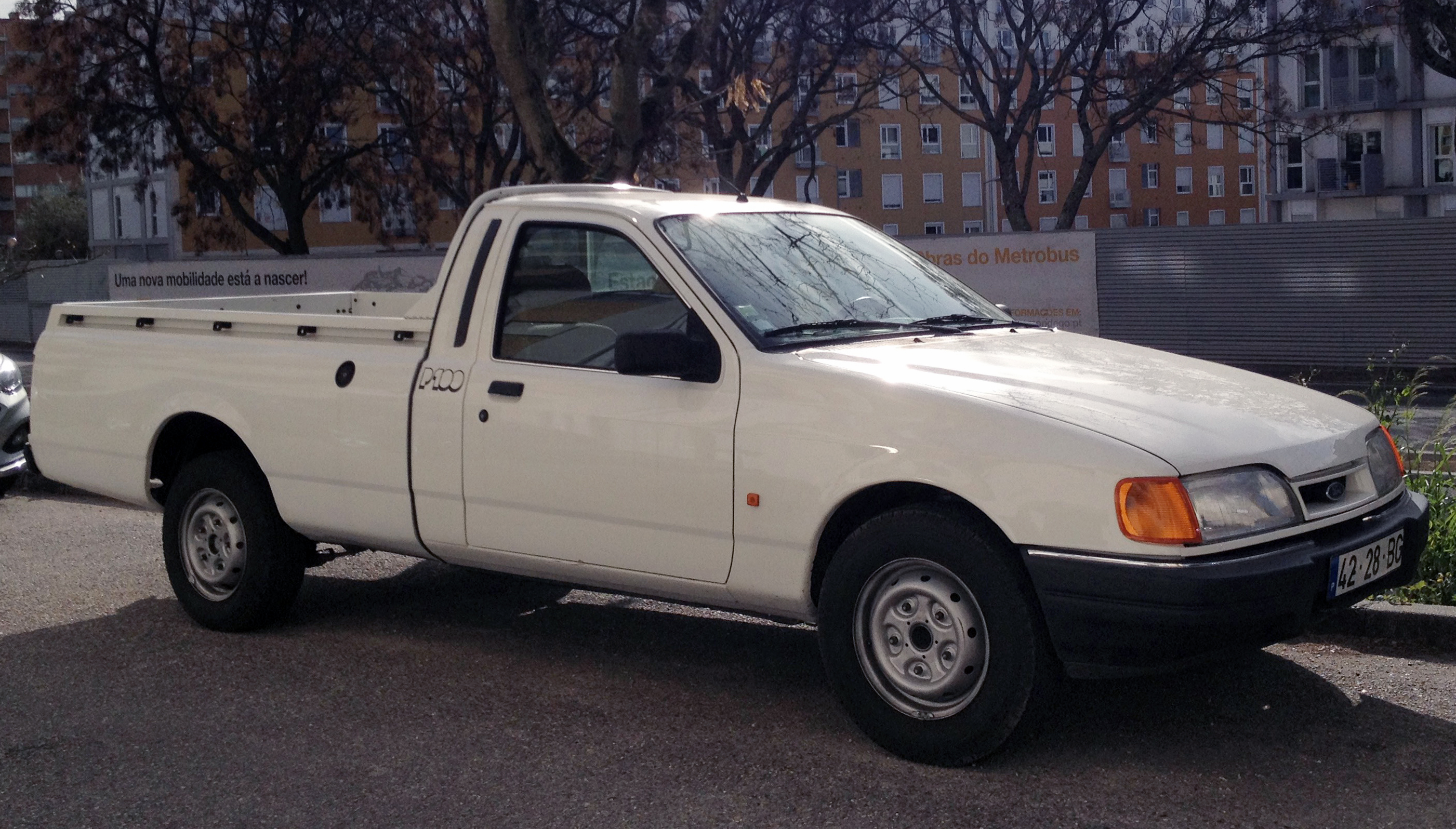
Ford P100 Pickup - (Ford Sierra based)

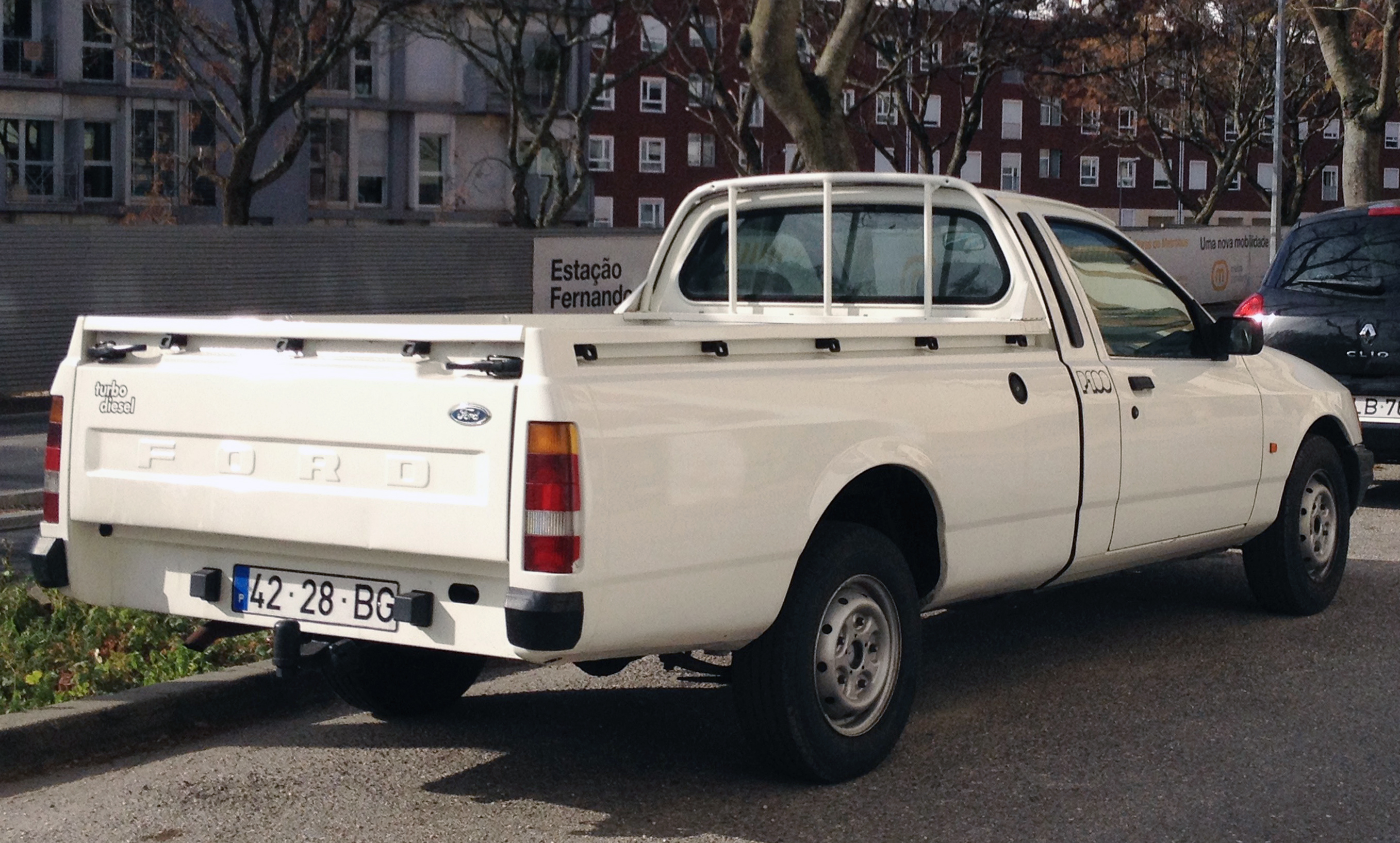
Ford P100 Pickup - (Ford Sierra based)

== Differences between the Cortina and Sierra ==
The P100, while it appeared similar to the models that it was based upon, had several key differences under its skin. While it used the front bodywork of the Cortina, and later Sierra, only the front half of the underbody was used - the rear, from the middle of the front seats backward, used a ladder chassis for which the tray was mounted to, which could accept a payload of 1000 kg.

The P100 was longer than the corresponding Cortina and Sierra models, and had a higher ride height due to having a multi leaf spring suspension in the rear and larger five-stud wheels all round. The later Sierra front hubs were from the Granada with adapter plates to allow fitment of the heavier duty Ford Transit wheel. Its rear axle was lifted directly from the SWB Transit 80, hence the need for the front adapters to match.

The later P100's gearbox was simply a lower ratio version of the popular Ford T9 gearbox which was also fitted in some earlier Transits, unlike the car version of the Sierra the Type 9 was used up until production ceased - the cars had been updated in 1989 to the MT75 box. While this was a stronger box, it did not use a slip joint yoke so was unsuitable for use on the P100, as it had a live axle compared to the cars independent rear setups with non-moving diff units.

== Engine options ==
=== Ford Cortina Pickup (Mark III) ===
- 1.6 L 4-cylinder OHV * 2.0 L V4
- 2.5 L V6 OHV (Essex)

=== Ford 1-Tonner (Mark IV) ===
- 3.0 L V6

=== Ford 1-Tonner (Mark V) ===
- 1.6 L 4-cylinder
- 3.0 L V6

=== Ford P100 (Cortina Mark V based) ===
- 1.6 L 4-cylinder OHC petrol, 72 bhp (54 kW; 73 PS)
- 2.0 L 4-cylinder petrol, 90 bhp (67 kW; 91 PS)

=== Ford P100 (Sierra based) ===
- 1.8 L 4-cylinder TD (1753 cc); 75 PS (55 kW; 74 hp) Endura-D engine
- 2.0 L 4-cylinder OHC (1998 cc); 74 PS (54 kW; 73 hp) Pinto engine

== Modifications ==
In recent years the Sierra-based P100 has gained a following in drifting and modifying circles, and many are becoming modified to include Cosworth engines, which are based on the truck version of the Pinto block.

There are many Ford P100 Pickups which have been modified by their owners. The running gear from any Sierra and certain running gear from the Ford Granada can be fitted to the front of the P100. The rear suspension is vehicle specific, with the Capri/Mk1/2 Escort atlas axles being interchangeable, however it requires much more modification (other than simply bolting in) to fit Sierra independent or any other rear running gear. Many modifiers have converted their P100 to Sierra XR/Cosworth drivetrain and running gear. The very fact that they are so easily modified under the bonnet and inside the cab has made the P100 extremely popular in modifying and cruise circles. The Cosworth BOA 24v and YB 16v engines are a popular choice. Rover and Ford V8s are also a common swap, the former being the same weight as the Pinto unit.

In 2013, a modified British P100 became the fastest coffee-powered vehicle in the world reaching 65.5 mph (105.4 km/h), entering the Guinness World Records.

In 2026, British Youtube channel All The Gear modified a 1991 P100 by assembling a permanent log cabin (with an interior) in the back of the vehicle. This addition added approximately 248 kilograms to the total weight of the vehicle and brought the height of the vehicle approximately 1.9 meters. The vehicle is able to drive perfectly with the modification.
