= Ford Equator (concept car) =

Concept car

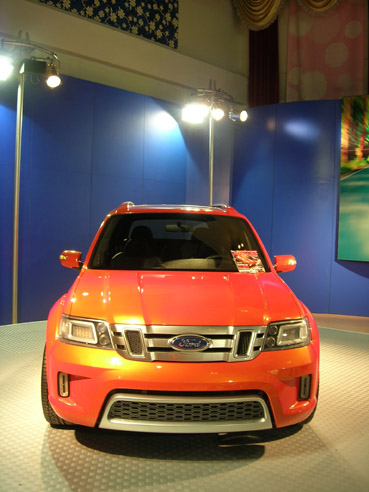

Overview
- Manufacturer: Ford
- Also called: Ford Escape (ZC, production model)
- Designer: William Lee under the lead of Paul Gibson

Body and chassis
- Class: Concept car
- Body style: 5-door SUV
- Layout: Front-engine, all-wheel-drive
- Platform: Ford CD2 platform
- Related: Ford Escape (first generation)

Powertrain
- Engine: Gasoline: 3.0 L Duratec V6
- Power output: 194 hp (145 kW; 197 PS)
- Transmission: 6-speed automatic

Dimensions
- Wheelbase: 2,620 mm (103.1 in)
- Length: 4,424 mm (174.2 in)
- Width: 1,780 mm (70.1 in)
- Height: 1,790 mm (70.5 in)

The Ford Equator is a concept car by the Ford Motor Company first presented in 2005 to preview the future styling that Ford would use for models in the Asia-Pacific market.

== Overview ==
The Equator concept debuted at the 2005 Tokyo Auto Show and was based on the then-current generation of the Ford Escape. It was designed under Paul Gibson, Ford's chief head of design for Ford's Asia Pacific and Africa region. It was co-developed in Australia and Taiwan, with Paul Gibson and William Lee (who Gibson worked with) being from those countries respectively. It previewed the Asia-Pacific region's version of the first-generation Escape. The exterior dimensions are shared with the North American Escape's dimensions.

=== Design ===
The exterior uses a new front bumper, lower side skirts, and large 19-inch wheels which were used to make it look more modern. It was painted in a shade of orange that Ford said was to "evoke the image of the rising sun over the equatorial horizon." A larger air intake is used in the front, new headlights are also used, and a new grille was also installed.

=== Features ===
The Equator concept received new seats made by Ming Fong Industries that are embossed in vinyl. A DVD player and navigational system are included on the dashboard, with a digital compass mounted below. GSK supplies the three-spoke steering wheel. Blue ambient lighting is used to complement the cobalt blue accents.

== Powertrain ==
The Equator Concept used a 3.0 L Duratec V6 engine paired with a full-time all-wheel-drive system. The engine's power output is tuned to 194 horsepower (145 kW; 197 PS) and 265 pound-feet (359 N⋅m), and is paired to a six-speed automatic that is controlled using a gear selection system controlled by buttons. The 4WD system can engage the rear wheels using an electronically controlled clutch. The Equator's Duratec engine also received an aluminum block, aluminum heads, and dual-overhead camshafts.

=== Suspension and braking ===
The front suspension uses MacPherson struts with an anti-roll bar and ther rear suspension uses a multi-link setup. It also uses four-wheel disc brakes all measuring 11.9 inches (302 mm) in diameter paired with an anti-lock braking system.
