= Institute of British Carriage and Automobile Manufacturers =

The Institute of British Carriage and Automobile Manufacturers was established in 1881. It merged with the Institute of Body Engineers in 1965. In 2000 it changed its name to IVehE (the Institute of Vehicle Engineers) as part of a rebranding strategy to modernise the organisation but soon after, in 2004, it merged with the SAE-UK.

== IBCAM Awards ==
Over their long history, IBCAM have sponsored numerous prestigious industry awards, including environmental awards, auto design awards and student awards. Notable winners include the Toyota Prius (1998 and 2000 IBCAM/IVehE Environment Awards), and the Mazda MX-5 (1998 IBCAM Auto Design Award).
