= Ford Escort (China) =

Compact car

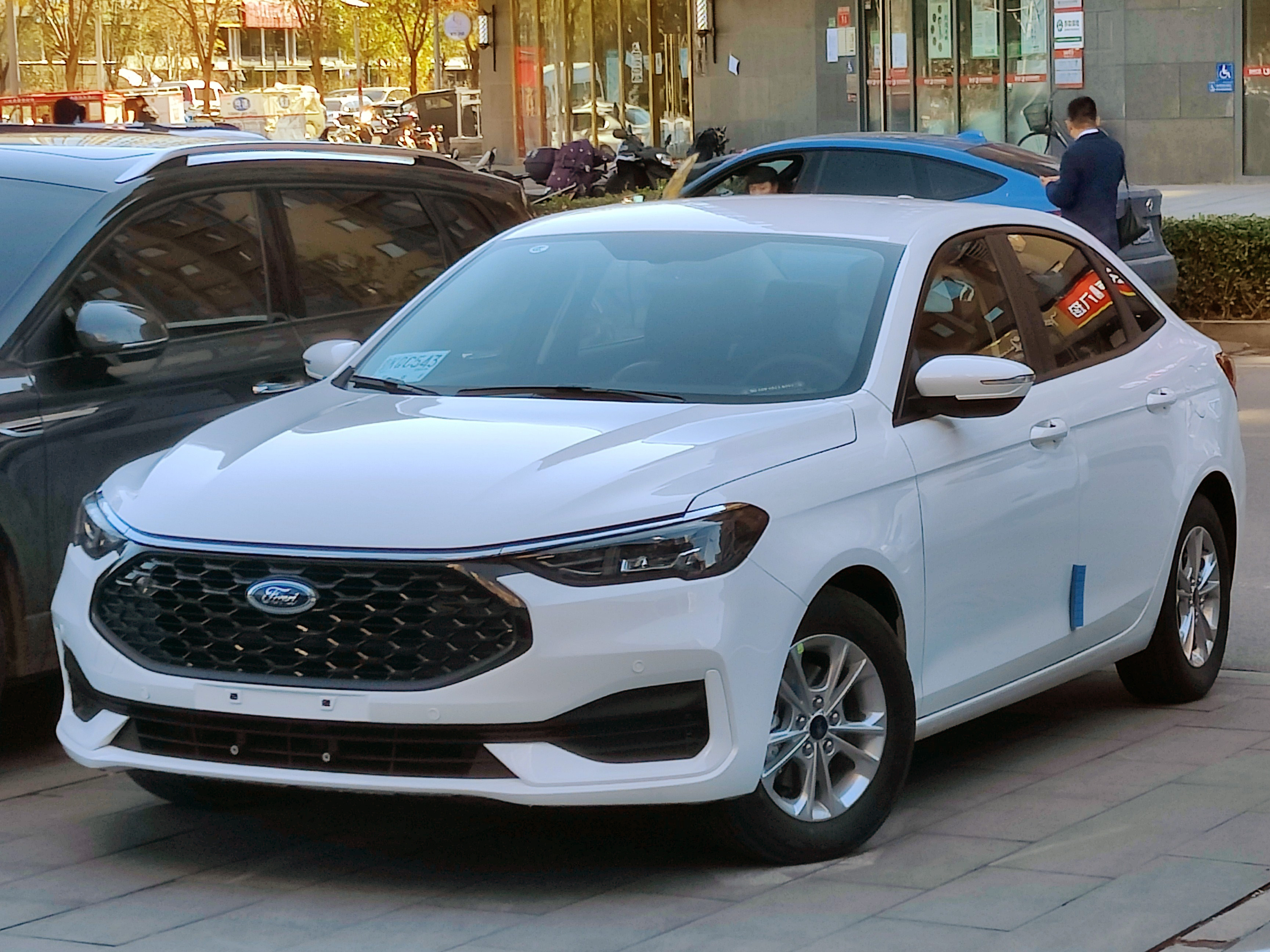
- Ford Escort 2021MY

Overview
- Manufacturer: Ford
- Production: 2015–2023 (China); 2017–2020 (Taiwan)
- Assembly: China: Chongqing (Changan Ford); Taiwan: Taoyuan (Ford Lio Ho)
- Designer: Andrew Collinson (Exterior Design Manager); Kartik Ramanathan (Vehicle Engineering Manager); Emily Lai (Color + Materials Design Manager)

Body and chassis
- Class: Compact car
- Body style: 4-door sedan
- Layout: Front-engine, front-wheel-drive
- Related: Ford Focus

Powertrain
- Engine: 1.5 L Ti-VCT I4
- Transmission: 5 speed manual 6 speed automatic

Dimensions
- Wheelbase: 105.8 in (2,687 mm)
- Length: 180.6 in (4,587 mm)
- Width: 71.9 in (1,825 mm)
- Height: 58.7 in (1,490 mm)
- Curb weight: 2,767–2,866 lb (1,255–1,300 kg)

Chronology
- Predecessor: Ford Focus Classic (China); Ford Fiesta (sedan, Taiwan)

The Ford Escort (Chinese: 福特福睿斯; pinyin: Fútè Fúruìsī) is a compact car sold on the Chinese, Taiwanese and Middle Eastern market by the Ford Motor Company. Following its announcement in mid-2013 that they intended reviving the "Escort" name for a car based on an older version of the Ford Focus, Ford launched the new Escort in January 2015.

== History and lineage ==
Ford had used the Escort name on three earlier car lines; firstly on a variant of the Ford Squire sold in the UK 1955 to 1961, then on the better-known European Ford Escort sold from 1968 to 2002, and the North American Ford Escort sold between 1980 and 2003.

In 2013, Ford announced its intention to resurrect the "Escort" nameplate on the Chinese market in 2014, with a compact car based on the then-current Ford Focus Classic, itself a version of the second generation of Ford Focus. The Chinese Escort was designed in Australia and was intended to be the technical successor of the Focus Classic and positioned under the current third generation Ford Focus.

When launched, the first generation Ford Focus had itself been the replacement for both the European and the North American Escort lines in their respective markets.

== Specification ==
The Chinese market Ford Escort is based on the China-made second generation Ford Focus, named the Focus Classic built on the Ford C1 platform. The Focus Classic was manufactured and sold alongside the third generation Ford Focus. The platform underpinning the Escort in China is called the C1 MCA and is produced in China by the Changan-Ford joint venture. The power of the Chinese market Ford Escort comes from a 1.5-liter four-cylinder petrol engine producing 113 hp (84 kW; 115 PS) and 142 N⋅m (105 lb⋅ft), mated to a five-speed manual transmission or a six-speed automatic transmission.

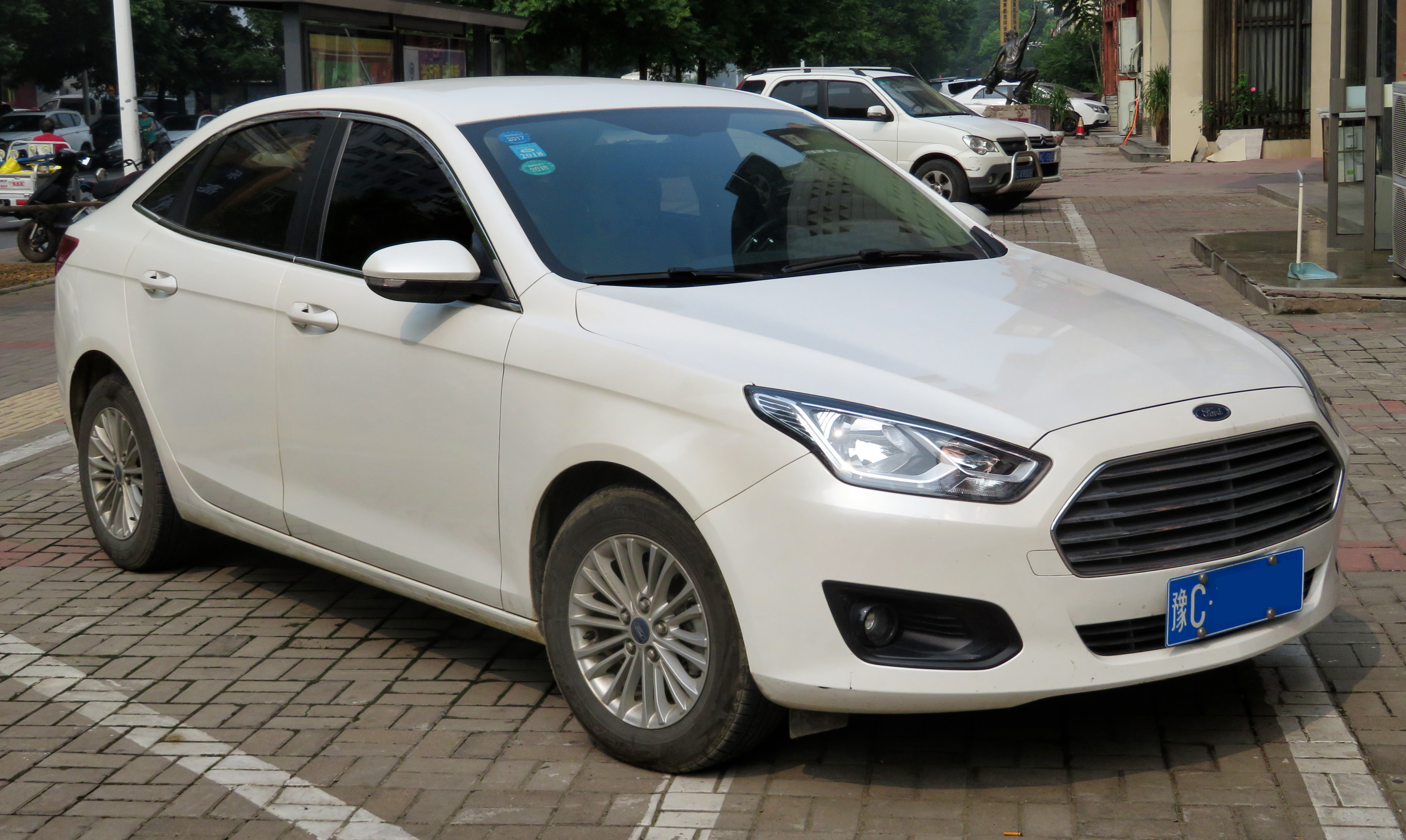
Front end

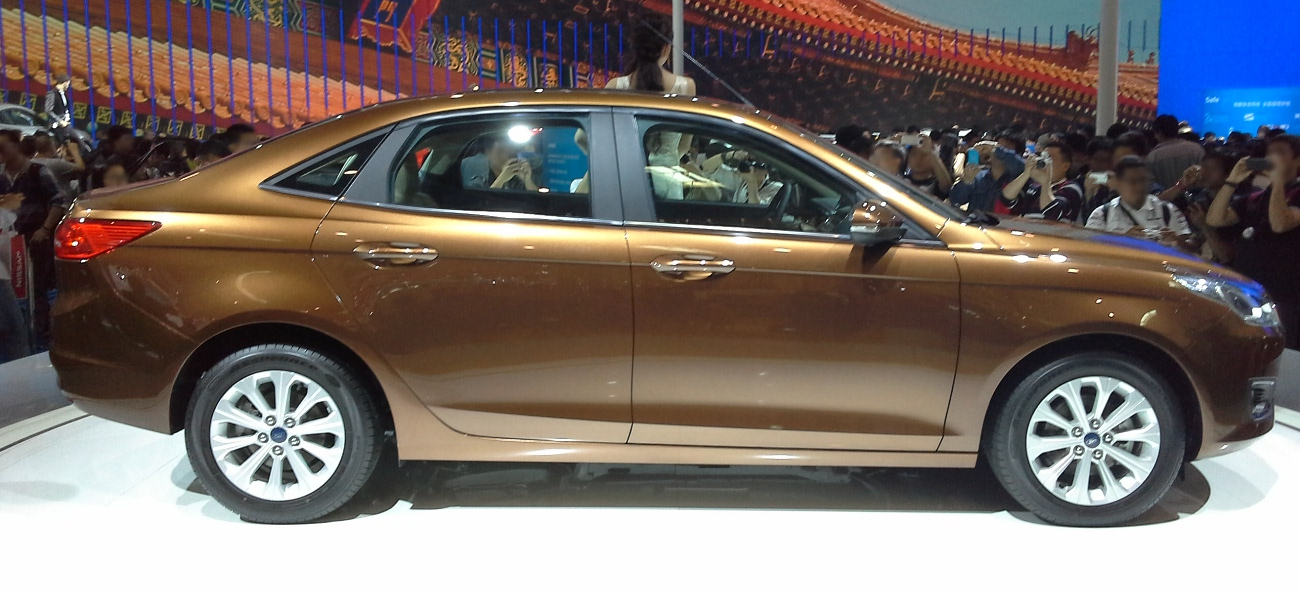
Side view

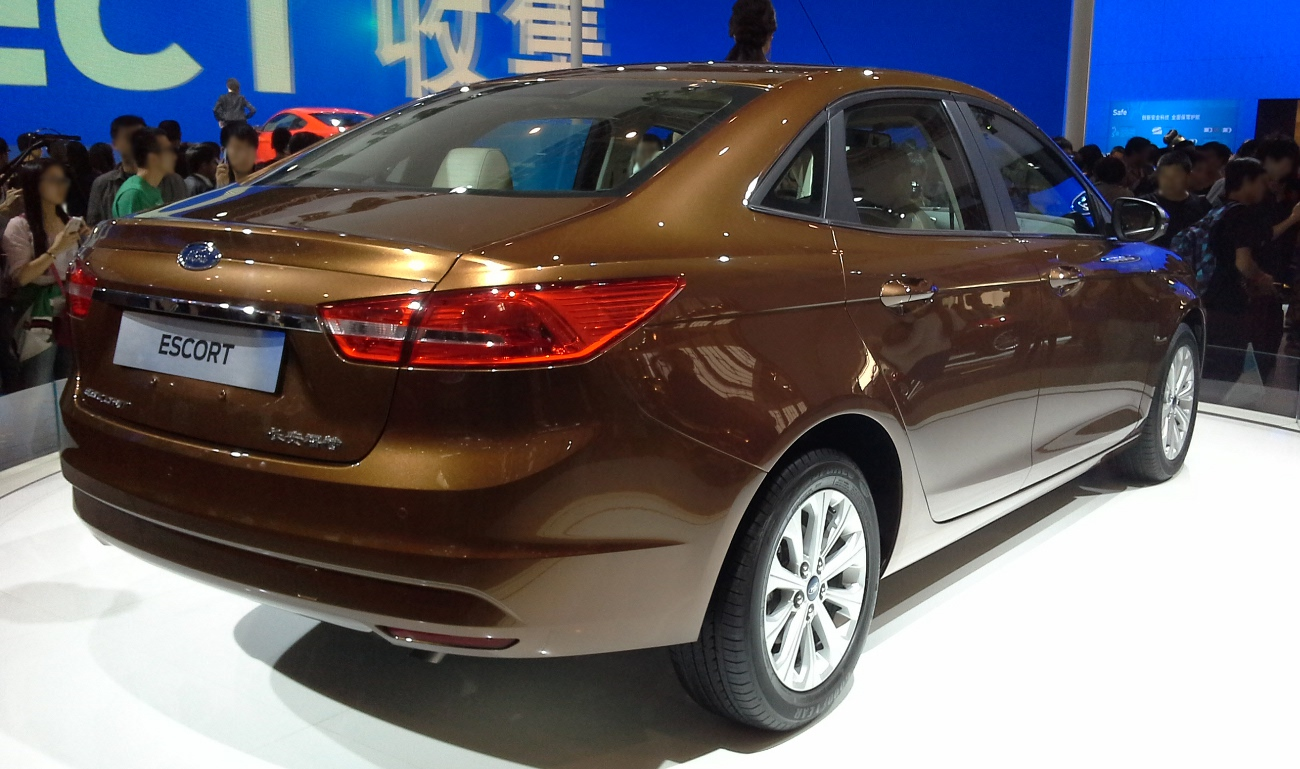
Rear end

== Reception ==
The UK magazine and website Autocar gave the Escort three out of five stars, expressing surprise that the Escort name had been revived for a market where it had no heritage and commenting that "the Escort name is from another age [and] essentially it is a cheap car cobbled together from Ford’s parts bin". They also noted that the suspension had been tweaked to suit Chinese road conditions, but stated that they did not think it seemed cheap enough for the intended market.

As of April 2018, over 800,000 examples of the Chinese market Escort have been sold since the model was launched in December 2014.

== 2018 facelift ==
The Chinese market Ford Escort received a facelift in April 2018 to be more in line with the fourth generation Focus revealed at the same time. Upgrades include a slightly revised exterior, which appears to draw inspiration from the updated Focus range with larger headlamps and restyled tail lamps. The 2018 facelift Escort sedan is powered by a newly added 1.5-litre 'Ti-VCT' petrol engine. Additional features include electronic stability control now being standard, side curtain airbags, tire pressure monitors, powered adjustable front seats with memory, powered folding exterior mirrors with memory, 8.0-inch display for the touchscreen infotainment system, rear-view camera, automatic headlights and wipers, and keyless entry with push-button start.

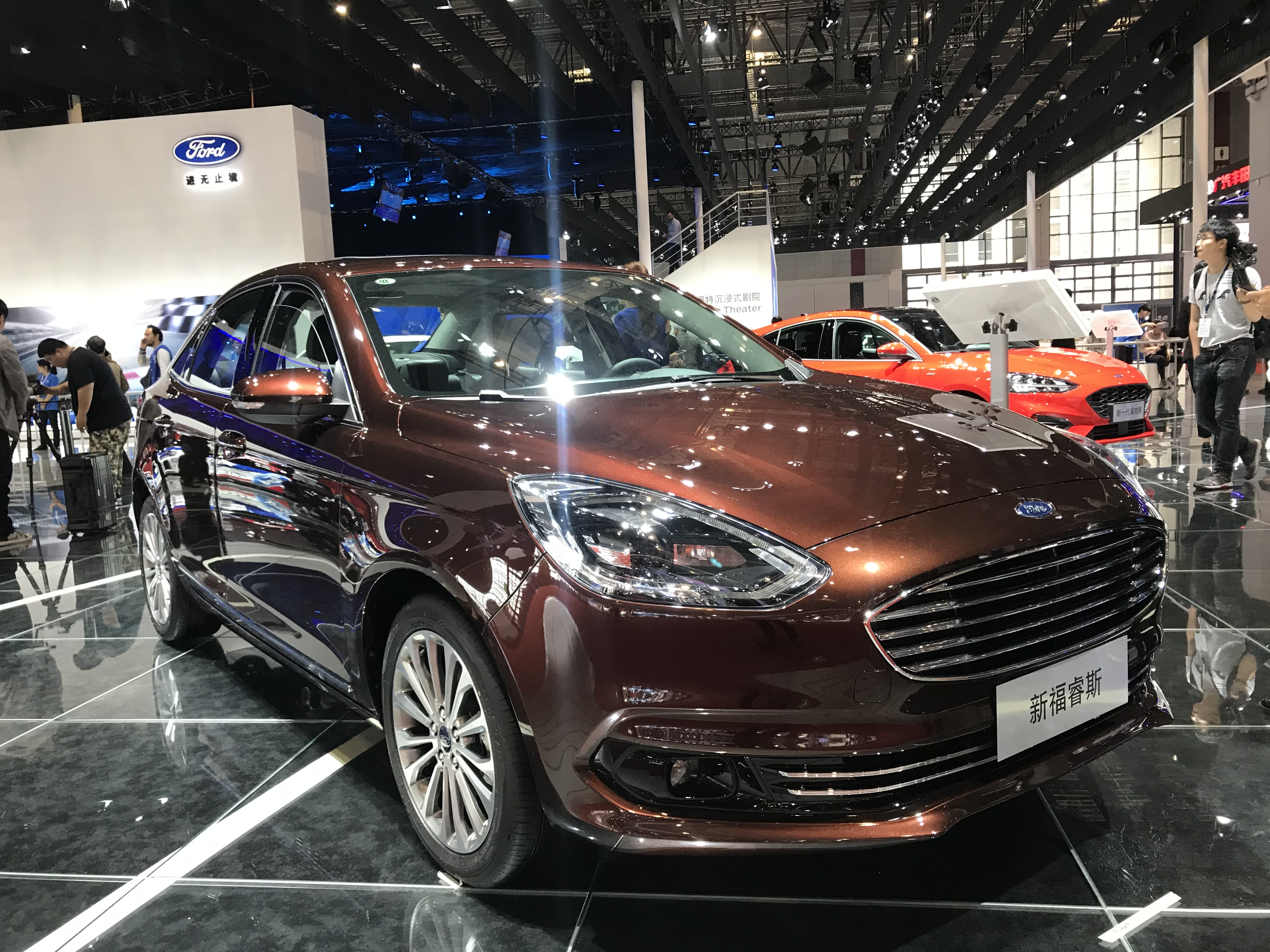
2018 facelift front end

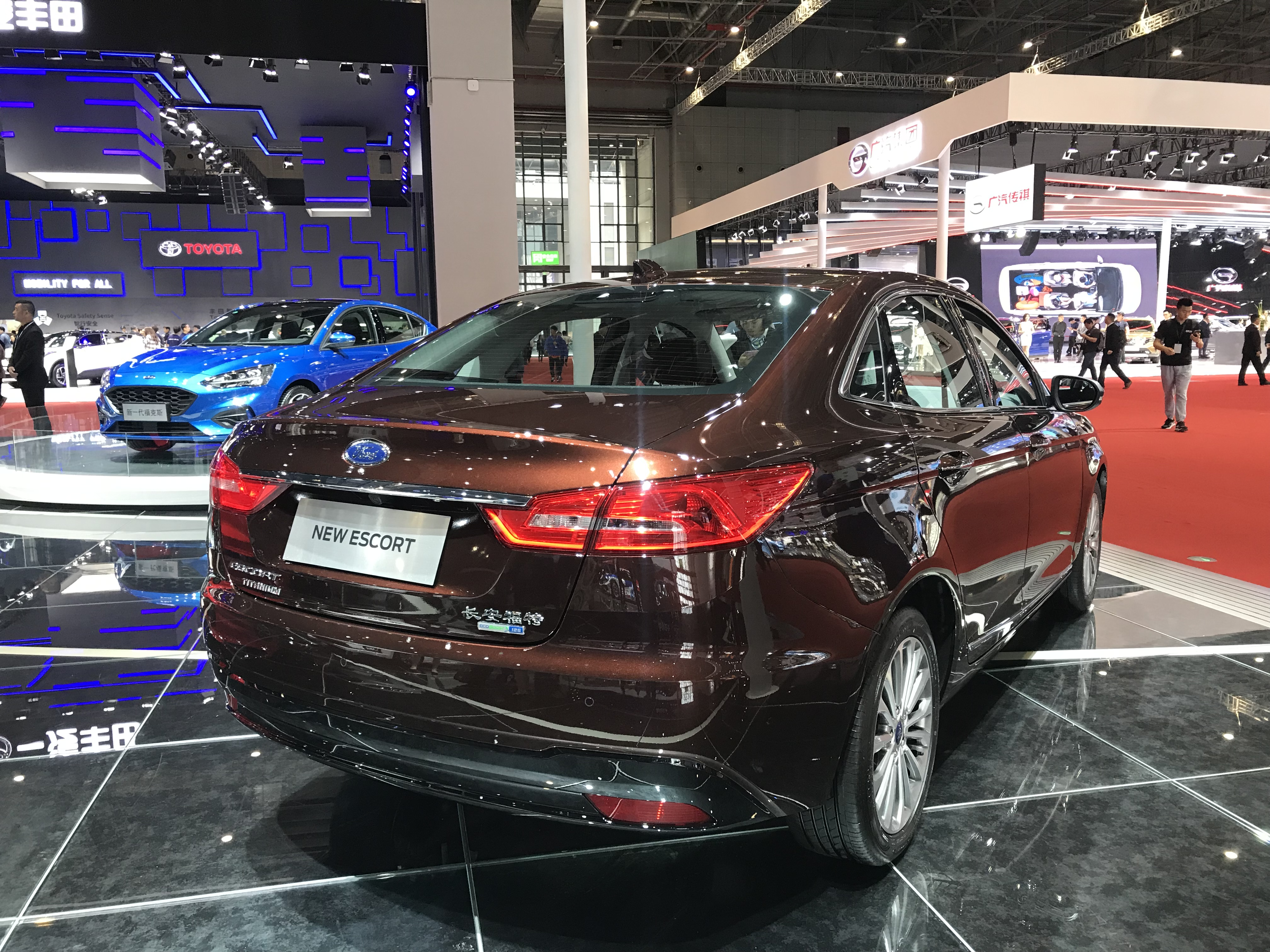
2018 facelift rear end

== 2021 facelift ==
The Escort 2021 facelift is 4.63 meters (182.2 inches) long, 1.82 meters (71.6 inches) wide, and 1.49 meters (58.6 inches) tall, with a wheelbase of 2.68 meters (105.5 inches). The car is powered by naturally aspirated 1.5-liter gasoline engine producing 122 hp (91 kW; 124 PS) and is mated to a six-speed manual or an automatic transmission. The facelift features completely redesigned front and rear ends, a revamped interior with a 10.25-inch screen, standard 15-inch alloys or optional 16-inch alloys for the higher trim levels. Production ended in 2023.

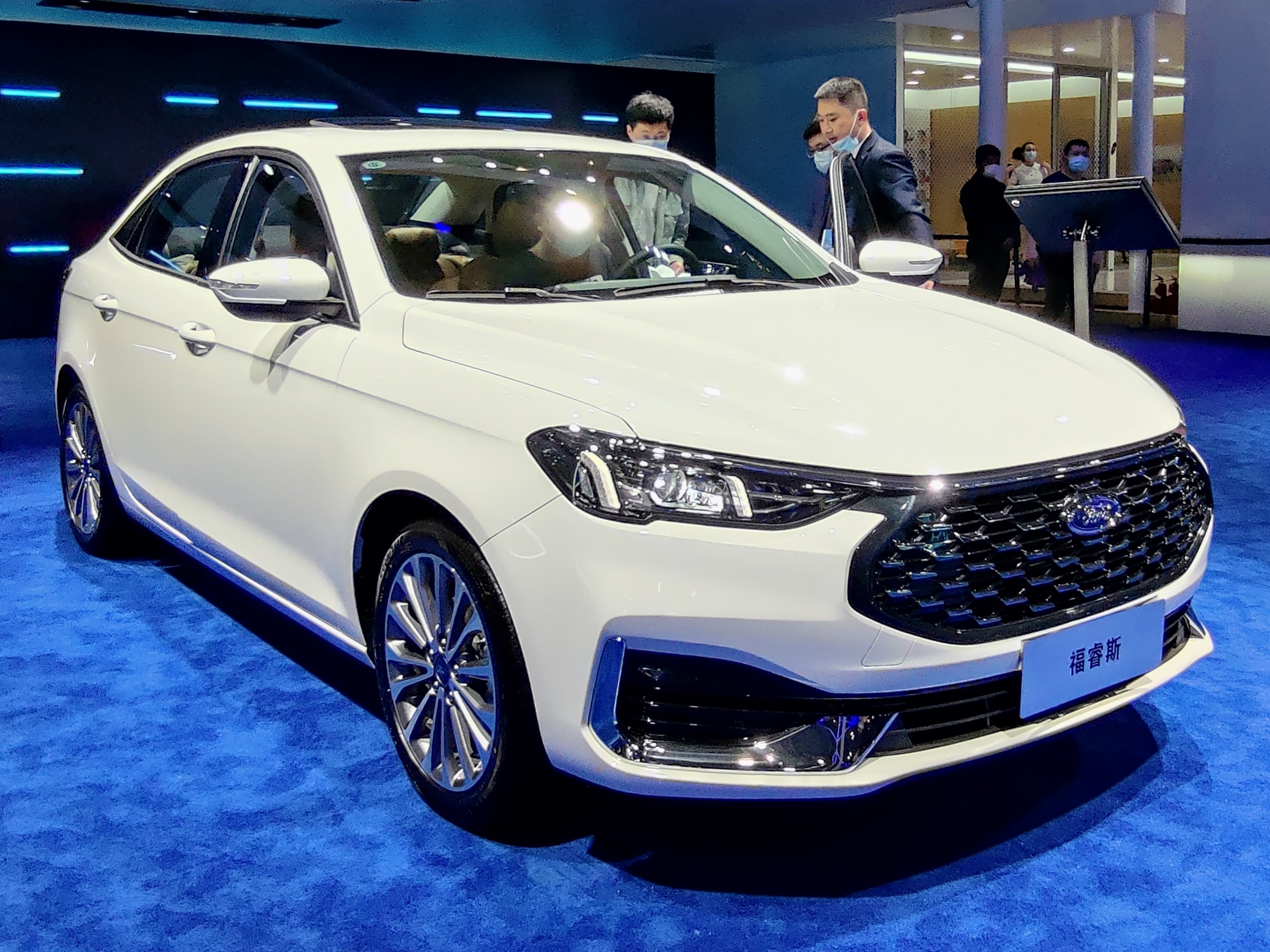
2021 facelift front end

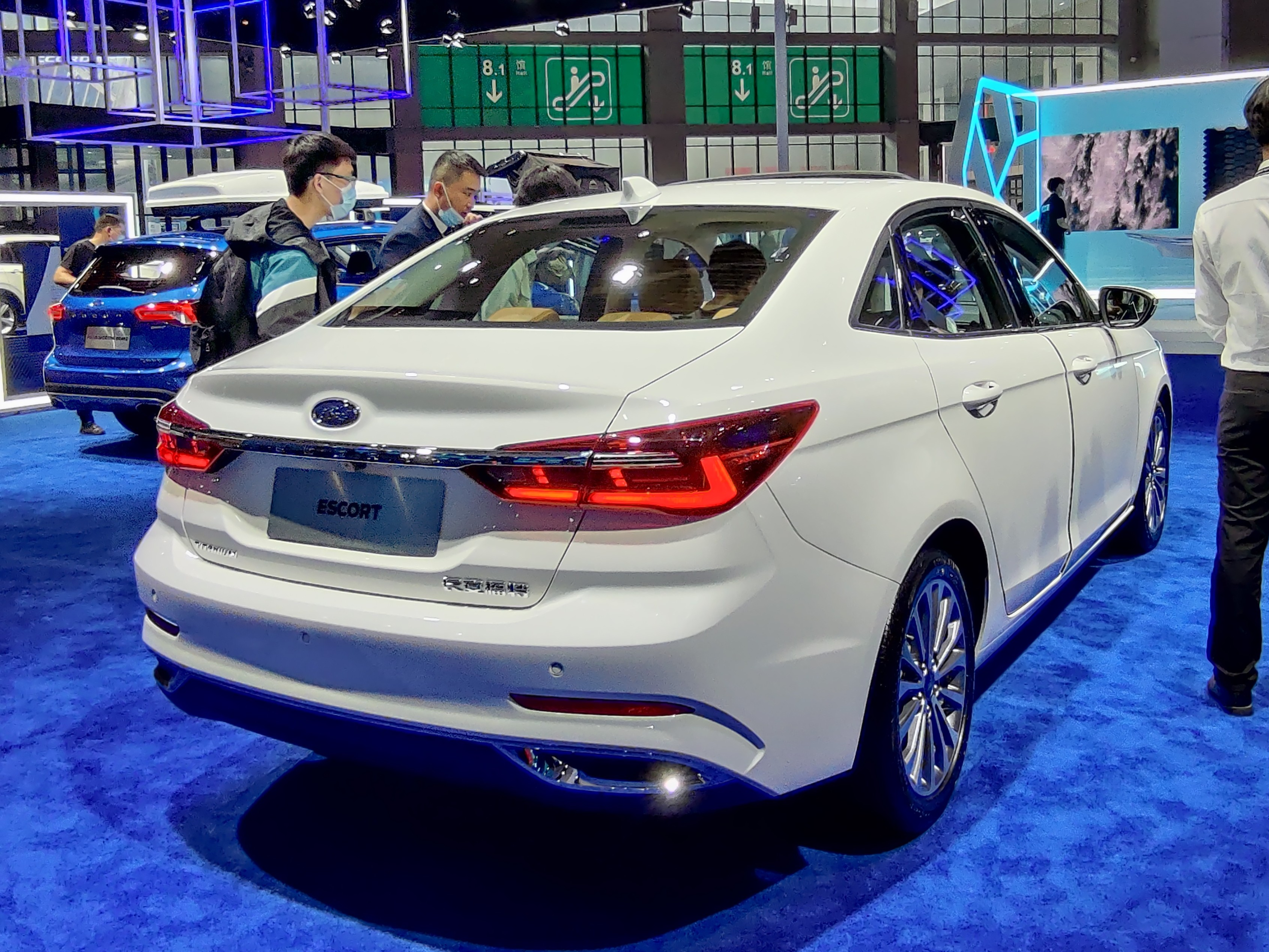
2021 facelift rear end

== Sales ==
Year	China
2014	3,710
2015	214,362
2016	296,867
2017	285,029
2018	150,360
2019	62,842
2020	33,049
2021	43,001
