= Ford Pockar =

Overview
- Manufacturer: Ford
- Production: 1980
- Designer: Ghia

Body and chassis
- Body style: microcar

Powertrain
- Engine: 957 cc (58.4 cu in)

Dimensions
- Wheelbase: 1,880 mm (74 in)
- Length: 2,845 mm (112.0 in)
- Width: 1,519 mm (59.8 in)
- Height: 1,390 mm (55 in)

The Ford Pockar is a four-person concept car designed by Ghia for Ford in 1980. Pockar was short for "pocket car."

== Features ==
The Pockar—named as "pocket car"—featured luggage compartments built into the exterior door panels. Both side doors were cut horizontally through the middle, and the lower portion dropped like a tailgate. In addition to the two lockable luggage compartments built into the doors, there was ample luggage space inside and room for four passengers. The rear seat could also be folded down flat for increased cargo capacity. The side door luggage compartments protruded into the interiors of the doors, and served as armrests. Electronic instruments on the dashboard were clustered in a semi-circular pod which was clearly visible through the upper half of the steering wheel.
