= Ford MA =

The Ford MA Concept concept car was a 2002 minimalist design exercise drawn by Jose Paris and championed by Ford's VP of design J. Mays. It was exhibited as an art object in museums as well as a traditional concept car in auto shows. It received an IDSA Silver Industrial Design Excellence Award in 2003.

The MA displayed many unusual automotive practices. It had the shape of a low slung two seat roadster with no top, but it was powered by an electric motor. The design was flexible enough, though, to accommodate a small internal combustion engine.

Very few of the parts were painted and there were none of the usual hydraulic fluids or industrial adhesives common in most cars, making it 96% recyclable.

It was designed to be assembled and disassembled easily with a minimal amount of equipment. There were no welds holding it together: Instead, its 500 or so pieces of bamboo, aluminum and carbon fibre were held together with 364 titanium bolts. The total weight was said to be 900 pounds (410 kg).

Some automotive columnists have presented the Ford MA as the forerunner to a small series kit car, much like the Lotus Seven. Others have called it an IKEA-mobile.
