= Ford EX =

Concept car created by Ford

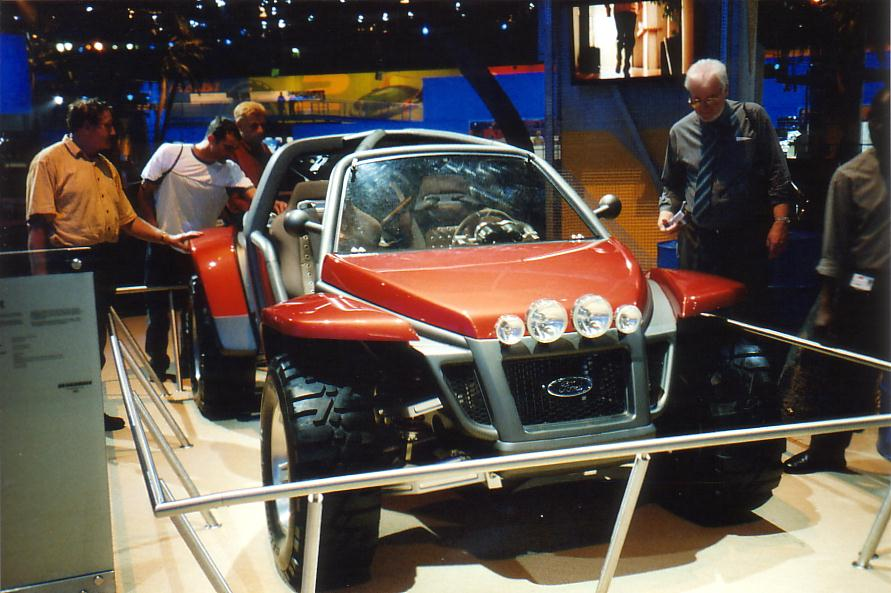
- The car on display at the 2004 British Motor Show in Birmingham, UK

Overview
- Manufacturer: Ford
- Production: 2001

Body and chassis
- Class: Concept car
- Body style: Dune buggy
- Layout: Front-engine, four wheel drive

Powertrain
- Engine: 4.0L SOHC supercharged V6 (gasoline)
- Transmission: 5-speed manual

The Ford EX (informally known as the Ford Ex and Ford Extreme) was a concept car created by the Ford Motor Company. It was first introduced at the 2001 North American International Auto Show. The EX was built to be an off-road vehicle.

== Design and specifications ==
=== Specifications ===
The EX was powered by a front-mounted, single overhead cam, 4.0-liter supercharged V6 gasoline engine, capable of producing up to 375 brake horsepower (280 kW) (93.8 hp per litre) and 410 ft⋅lbf (560 N⋅m) of torque. It has a five-speed manual transmission with four-wheel drive (4WD), and large 33-inch tires.

=== Design and construction ===
The design of the vehicle was spare, as it had no doors. The exterior was mainly composed of a durable chrome-molybdenum steel exoskeleton, advantageous for its off-road capability.

== In media ==
- The EX appears in the 2004 live-action film Thunderbirds.
- The EX appears as a playable vehicle in Ford Racing 2 and Ford Racing 3.

== Gallery ==
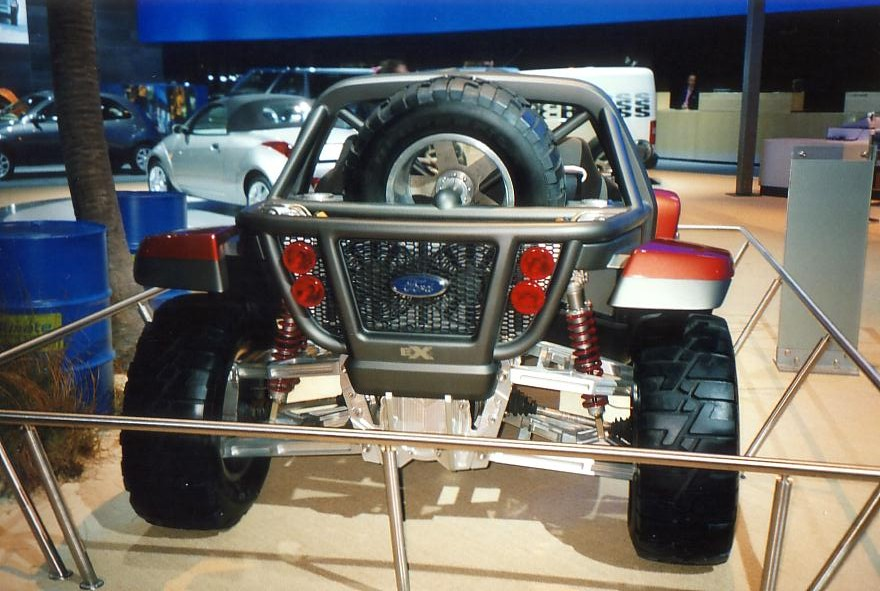
Rear view of the EX

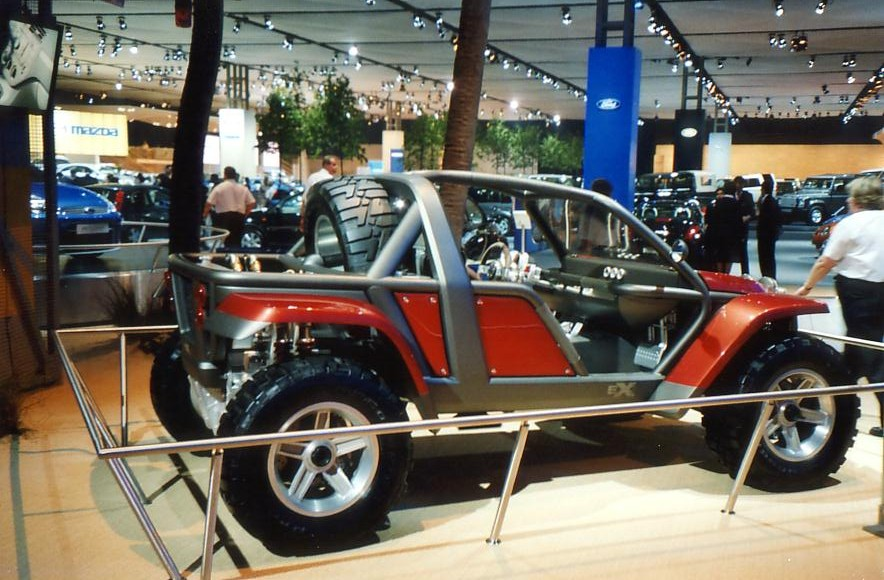
Rear 3/4 view of the EX

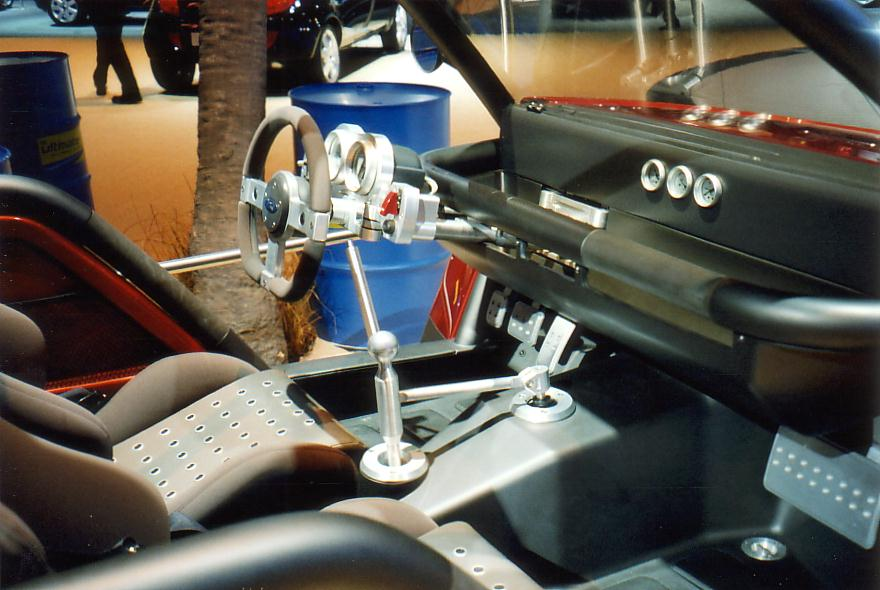
Interior of the EX
