= Ford Thames =

Ford Thames may refer to:

- Thames (commercial vehicles), often referred to as Ford Thames
- Ford Thames E83W, a light commercial vehicle produced from 1938 and 1957
- Ford Thames 300E, a car derived van produced from 1954 to 1961
- Ford Thames 307E, a small panel van produced from 1961 to 1967
- Ford Thames 400E, a commercial vehicle produced from 1957 to 1965
- Duxford, Oxfordshire, the one remaining ford crossing of the River Thames in England
