= Fordson WOT =

British Military truck from the 2nd World War

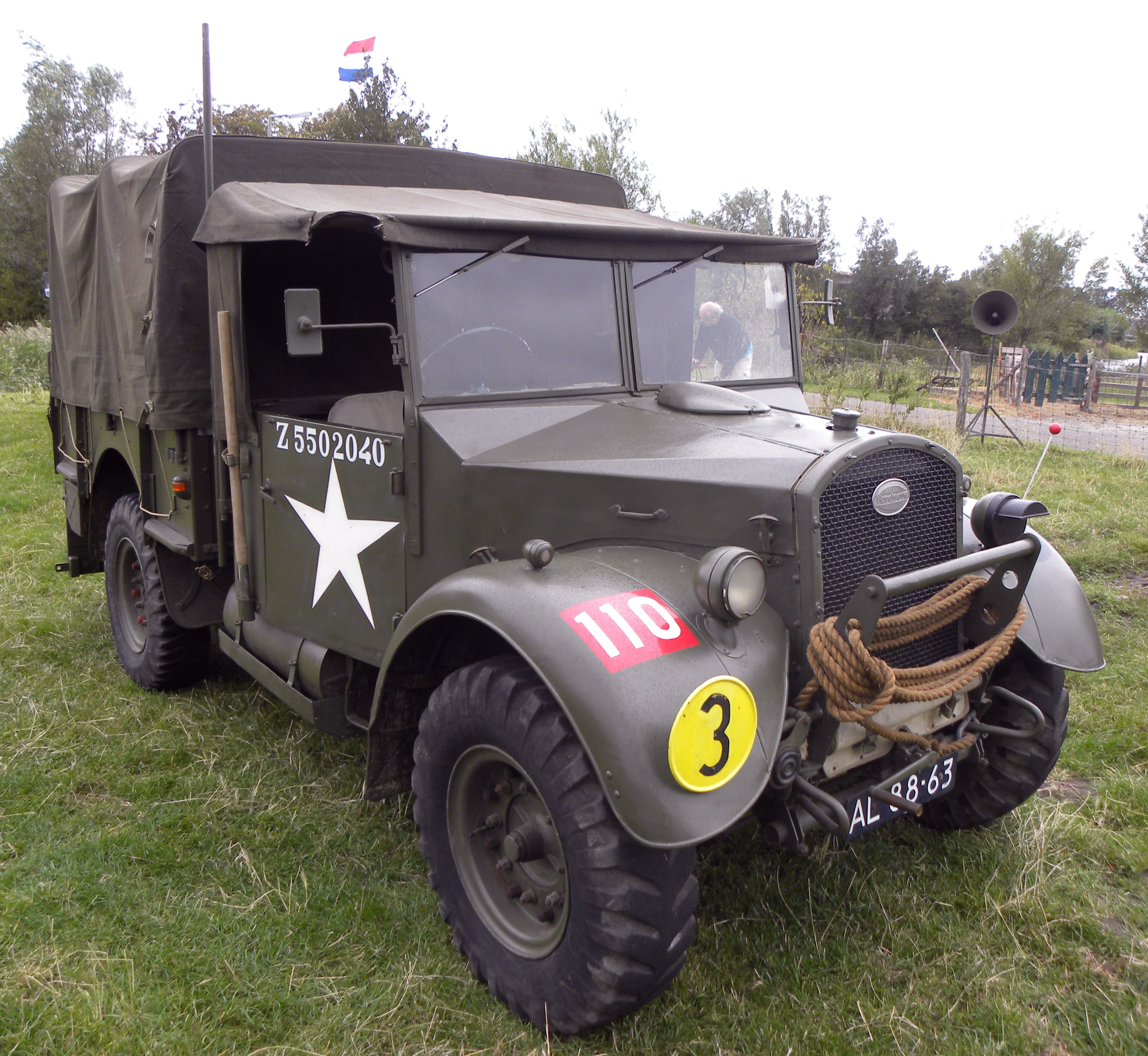
The Fordson WOT2 had a nominal 15-cwt (3/4 ton) payload

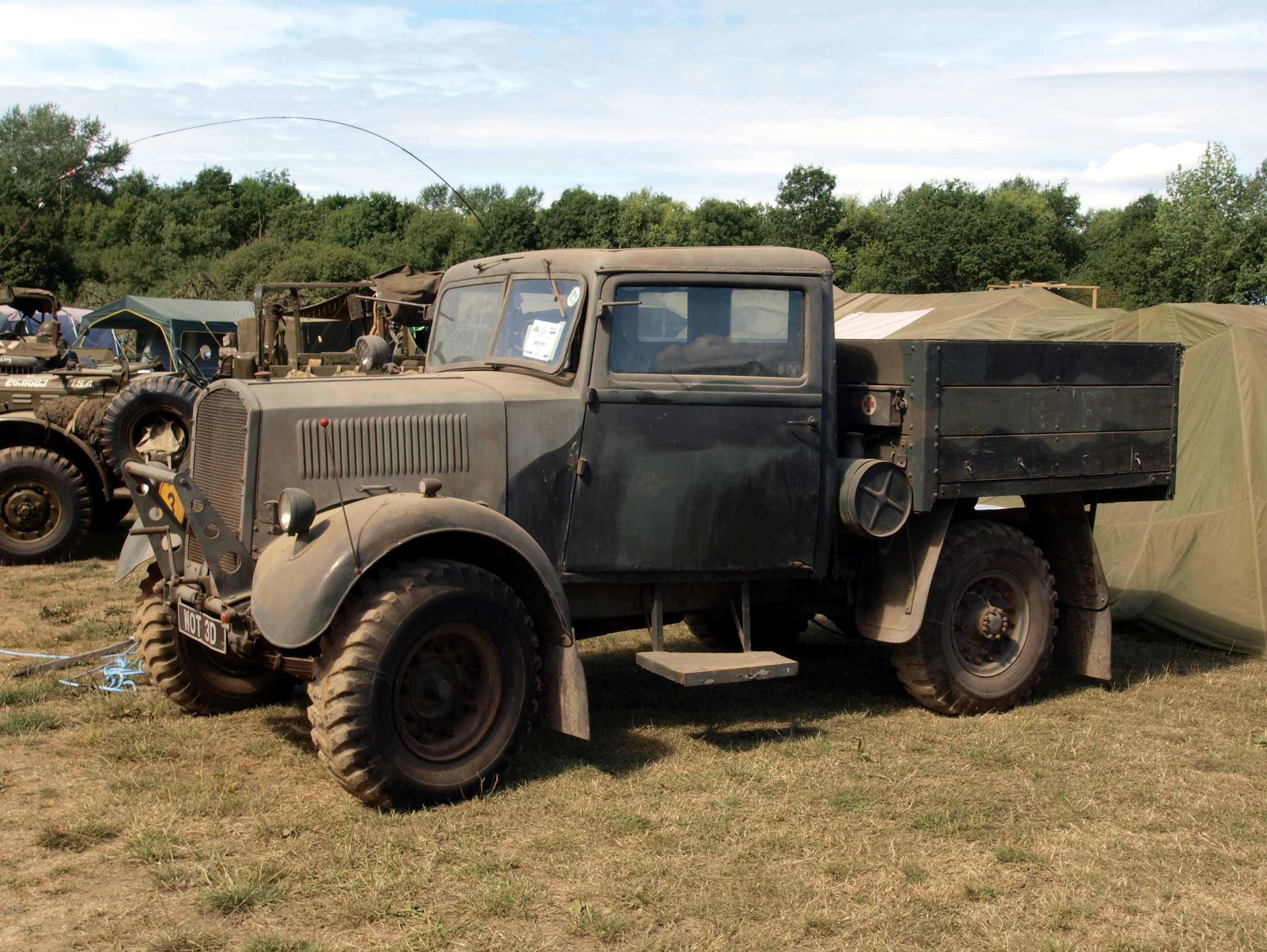
WOT3 Model D

The Fordson WOT (from War Office 'type' or 'truck' (Note: WOT from "War Office" Truck (or Type or Transport lorry))) was a military truck line produced by Ford of Britain in the Second World War. From 1939 to 1945, around 130,000 units (almost half being the WOT2) were produced at Ford Dagenham, where Fordson tractors for the British market were produced since 1933.

Five models, WOT1, WOT2, WOT3, WOT6 and WOT8 were produced. The WOT1, 2 and 3 were rear-wheel drive and had the cab behind the engine; WOT6 and 8 were all-wheel drive with a cab forward configuration. The same engine was used across the range - 3.6L Ford sidevalve V-8 petrol engine delivering 85 hp at 3,800 rpm. The transmission was a four-speed manual with an additional reduction gearbox for the four wheel drive models as well as the WOT 3D.

== Models ==
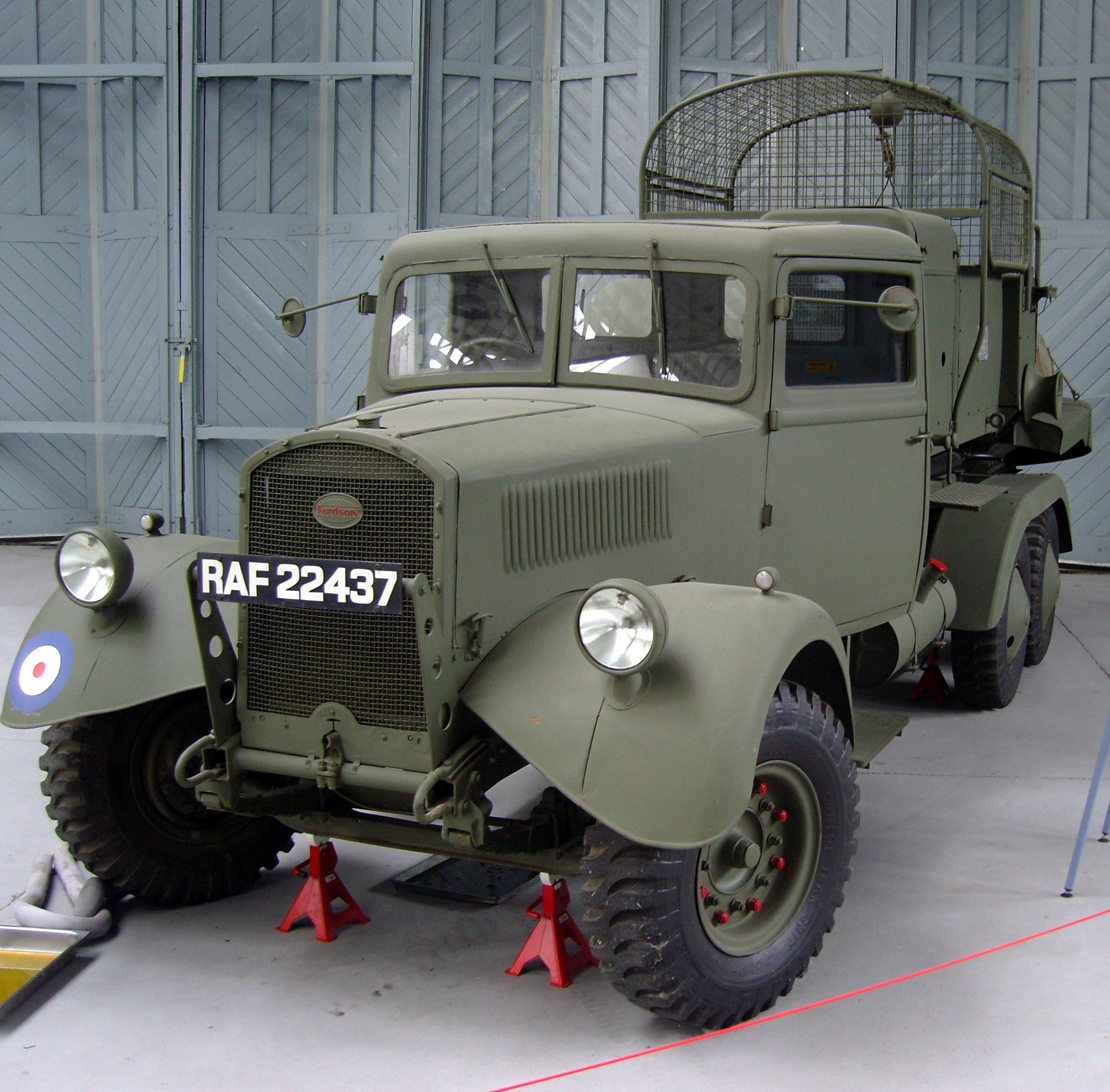
WOT1 fitted out as barrage balloon winch for the Royal Air Force

- WOT1

6x4, 164 in (4.2 m)
WOT1A was a 178 in (4.5 m) wheelbase version.
85 bhp V-8 engine four forward and one reverse gearbox with a x2 transfer box
WOT1 and 1A was mostly used by RAF eg as Fire Tenders

"Ambulance, Heavy, 6x4 (Fordson WOT1)

=== Conventional "long-nose" 4x2 lines ===
WOT2
- Norwegian soldiers transported in WOT2

Specifications
- Mass: 3.327 t (7,395 lb)
- Length: 14 ft 9 inch (4.50 m)
- Width: 6 ft 7 in (2.00 m)
- Height: 7 ft 6 in (2.28 m)
- Engine: V8 3.6L petrol 60 hp (45 kW)
- Payload capacity: 15 long hundredweight (760 kg)
- Transmission: 4-speed
- Fuel capacity: 23 imp gal (100 L)

RAF WOT3 used for carrying bomber crews to their aircraft

- WOT2

4x2, 15-cwt
WOT2A - first model
WOT2B and WOT2D - "tilt covered van body"
WOT2C - horizontal windscreen
WOT2E - late style cab
WOT2F - steel body, no tilt
WOT2H - like WOT2E
Fitted with a flatbed rear and 20mm gun it was "Truck, 15cwt, 4x2 AA" (Note: Same body and gun on the Bedford MWG and similar on CMP Chevrolet C15 and Ford F15.)

- WOT3

4x2, 30-cwt. used by RAF

=== Cab-over 4x4 lines ===
WOT6

Service history
- In service: 1942 -
- Used by: UK
- Wars: World War II

Production history
- Manufacturer: Ford
- Produced: to September 1945
- No. built: approx 30,000

Specifications
- Mass: 3.87 long tons (3,930 kg)
- Length: 19 ft 11 in (6.07 m)
- Width: 7 ft 6 in (2.28 m)
- Height: 10 ft 6 in (3.20 m)
- Engine: V8 petrol 85 hp (63 kW)
- Payload capacity: 60 long hundredweight (3,000 kg)
- Drive: 4 x 4
- Transmission: 4-speed, and 2-speed transfer case
- Fuel capacity: 35 imp gal (160 L)
- Operational range: 280 miles (450 km)

- WOT6

4x4, 60-cwt (3 ton).
11 ft 11 in wheelbase
Produced January 1942 to September 1945
Cab top could be removed to reduce overall height for shipping

- WOT8

4x4, 30-cwt.
85 bhp V-8 engine four forward and one reverse gearbox
derived from WOT6
9 ft 10 inch wheelbase
16 ft 8 in long, 7 ft 6 in wide, 9 ft 2 in high
3 tons 16 cwt
fixed cab roof
Used as artillery tractor in North African campaign. Also with office body.
Supplied to USSR where it was used for Katyusha rocket launchers

== Production ==
Vehicle production by Ford of Britain, 1939-1945
	Load capacity (cwt)	Wheelbase	Gross Vehicle Weight	Total quantity produced	Production period
WOT8	30 cwt	299 cm 9 ft 10 in	6,900 kg (6.8 long tons)	2,516	1941 – 1942
WOT6	60 cwt	360 cm 11 ft 11.5 in	8,100 kg (8.0 long tons)	29,693	January 1942 – September 1945
