= Ford Squire =

Estate design car

Ford Squire Ford Escort (100E)
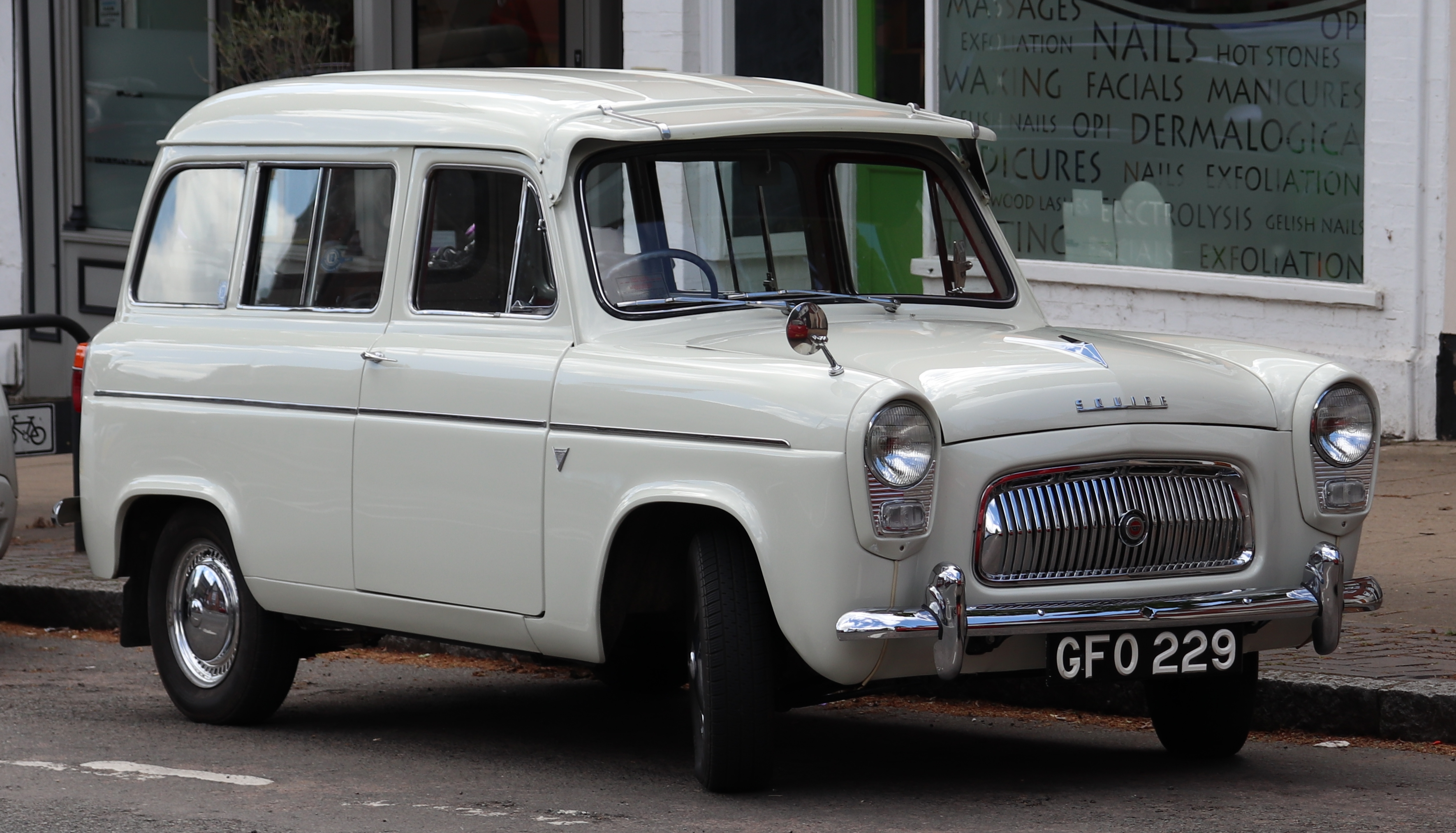
- Ford Squire

Overview
- Manufacturer: Ford UK
- Production: 1955–1959 (Squire); 1955–1961 (Escort 100E)
- Assembly: United Kingdom: Dagenham

Body and chassis
- Body style: 2-door estate
- Layout: FR layout
- Related: Ford Anglia; Ford Prefect; Thames 300E

Powertrain
- Engine: 1,172 cc (71.5 cu in) sidevalve, I4
- Transmission: 3-speed manual

Dimensions
- Wheelbase: 87 in (2,210 mm)
- Length: 142 in (3,607 mm)
- Width: 60.5 in (1,537 mm)
- Height: 63 in (1,600 mm)

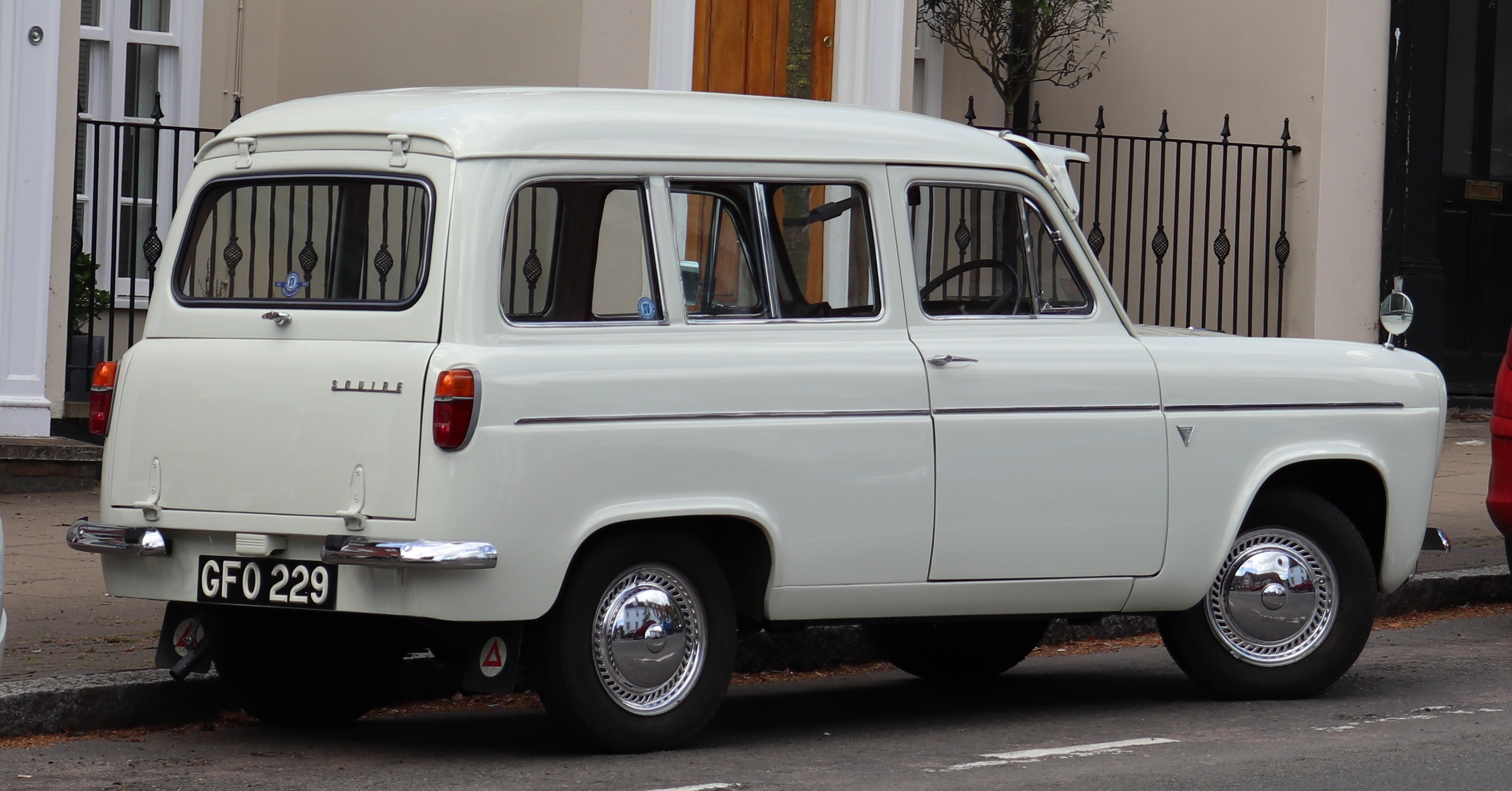
Rear view

The Ford Squire is a car that was produced by Ford UK from 1955 to 1959.

It was a two-door, four-seat estate design, related to the Ford Prefect 100E four-door saloon, sharing the same 1,172 cc (71.5 cu in) Ford sidevalve 36 bhp (27 kW) engine and other parts and the same interior trim. It was substantially shorter than both the Prefect and the closely related Ford Anglia 100E two-door saloon. It used the short front doors of the four-door model because the bodyshell was optimized for use as a panel van (which was marketed as the Thames 300E). The rear door was in two pieces split horizontally. The rear seat could be folded flat to convert from a four-seater to a load carrier and, until 1957, wood trim pieces were affixed to the sides of the vehicle.

The Squire competed in the same market segment as the Hillman Husky and Austin A30 / A35 based estate, both significantly more popular in the UK than longer estates at the time. Total production was 17,812 cars.

British magazine The Motor tested a Squire in 1955, recording a top speed of 69.9 mph (112.5 km/h), 0-50 mph (80 km/h) in 20.2 seconds, and a fuel consumption of 35.7 miles per imperial gallon (7.9 L/100 km; 29.7 mpg_{‑US}). The test car (with the optional heater) cost £668, including taxes.

== Ford Escort ==
The Ford Escort was a mechanically identical estate car with the lower trim level of the Ford Anglia. This proved more popular, and a total of 33,131 Escorts were produced between 1955 and 1961. Production of the Escort continued until 1961, two years longer than the Squire.

The Escort name was later used by Ford of Europe in 1968 on another small car, and a North American variant was introduced in 1980.

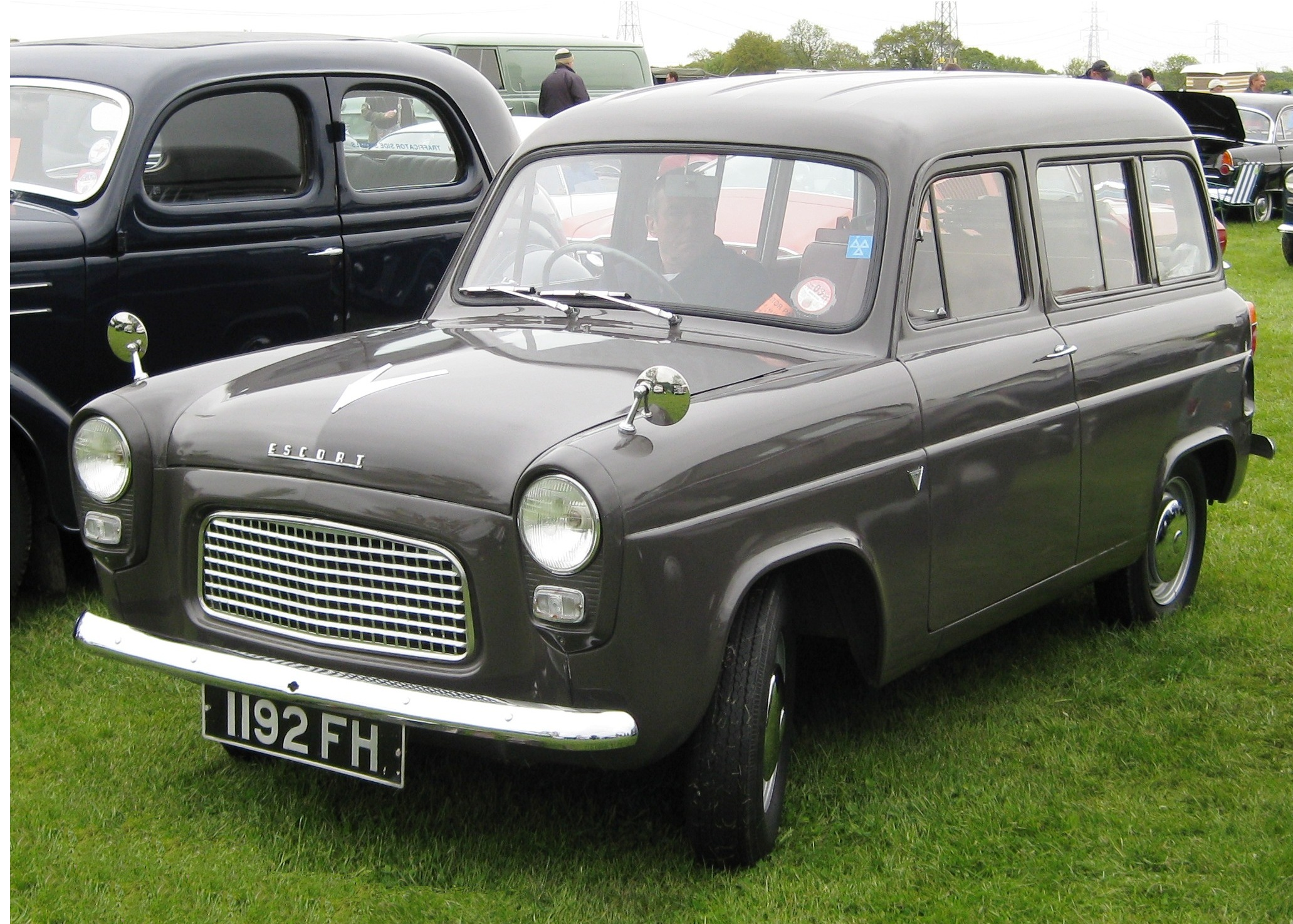
A less expensive variant of the Ford Squire was branded as the Ford Escort.
