= Ford 7W =

Ford Model 7W
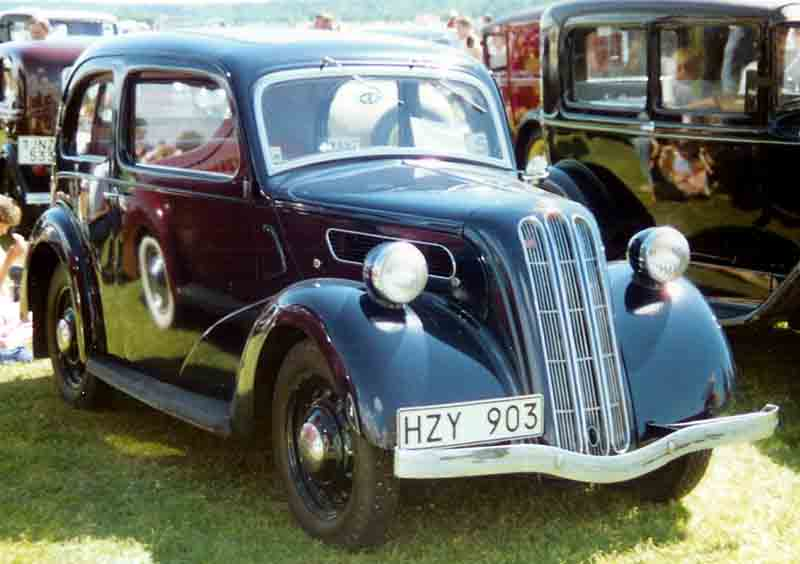

Overview
- Manufacturer: Ford UK
- Production: 1937–1938
- Assembly: United Kingdom: Ford Dagenham

Body and chassis
- Body style: 2- and 4-door saloon, tourer

Powertrain
- Engine: 1.2 L Ford Sidevalve engine

Dimensions
- Wheelbase: 82 in (210 cm)
- Length: 156 in (400 cm)
- Width: 57 in (140 cm)
- Curb weight: 1,790 lb (810 kg)

Chronology
- Predecessor: Ford Model C Ten
- Successor: Ford Prefect

The Ford 7W Ten is a car built by Ford UK between 1937 and 1938.

The car was an updated version of the Model C Ten with the same 1172 cc engine and three-speed gearbox, and used the same transverse leaf front and rear suspension. The chassis now featured a stiffer braced design, and the brakes were mechanical and bought in from Girling. The 7W Ten body style, available in both two- and four-door configurations and the first small English Ford model with an externally accessed luggage compartment, was the precursor to the first model to carry the 'Prefect' badge in 1939 (albeit in four-door form only) and which ran to 1953 as models E93A and E493A. 41,665 7Ws were built.
