= Ford Thames 300E =

Thames 300E
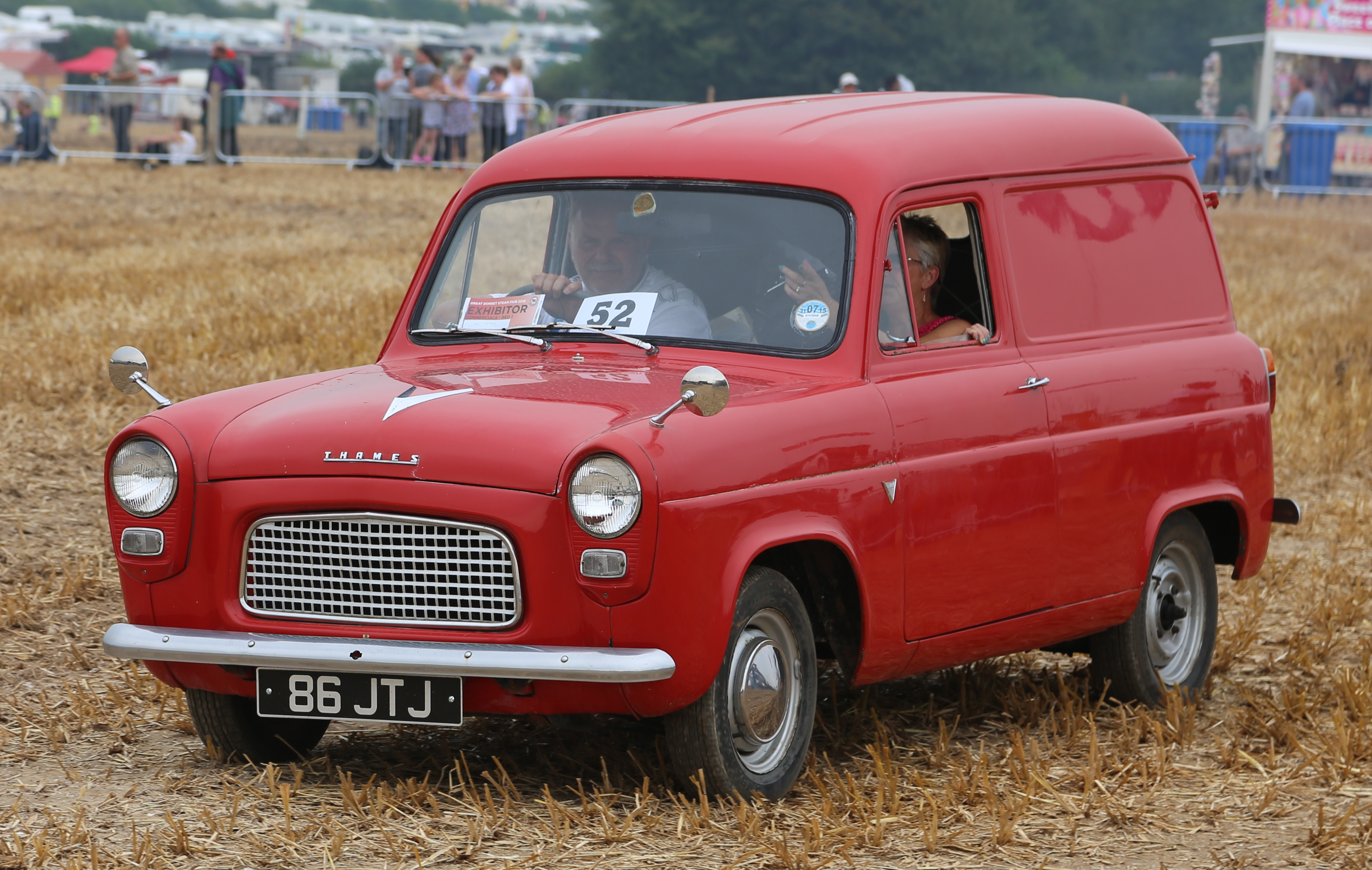

Overview
- Manufacturer: Ford UK
- Production: 1954–1961
- Assembly: United Kingdom; Australia

Body and chassis
- Body style: 2-door van
- Related: Ford Anglia 100E; Ford Escort 100E; Ford Squire

Powertrain
- Engine: 1,172 cc (71.5 cu in) []
- Transmission: 3-speed manual

Chronology
- Successor: Thames 307E

The Ford Thames 300E is a car derived van that was produced by Ford UK from 1954 to 1961. The Thames (or Thames Trader) name was given to all available sizes of commercial vehicle produced by Ford in Britain from the 1950s through to 1965. In that year the Thames and Trader names were discontinued.

== History ==
The 300E was introduced in July 1954, based on the Ford Anglia / Prefect 100E saloon range. It shared its bodyshell and 1172 cc sidevalve four-cylinder engine with the Ford Escort and Ford Squire estate car versions of the line. The bodyshell was optimized for use as a panel van rather than an estate with its two short passenger doors and shorter overall length than the saloons. Initially produced only as a single model with 5 cwt (560 lb; 254 kg) carrying capacity, the range was later expanded with the introduction of Standard and Deluxe 7 cwt (784 lb; 356 kg) variants. All three offered the same 66-cubic-foot (1.9 m^{3}) load volume. Production totalled 196,885 examples comprising 139,267 5 cwt, 10,056 Standard 7 cwt and 47,562 Deluxe 7 cwt units.

300E production ended in April 1961 and the van's replacement, the Anglia 105E based Thames 307E, was introduced in June of the same year.
