= Ford Prefect (car) =

Line of British automobiles (1938–1961)

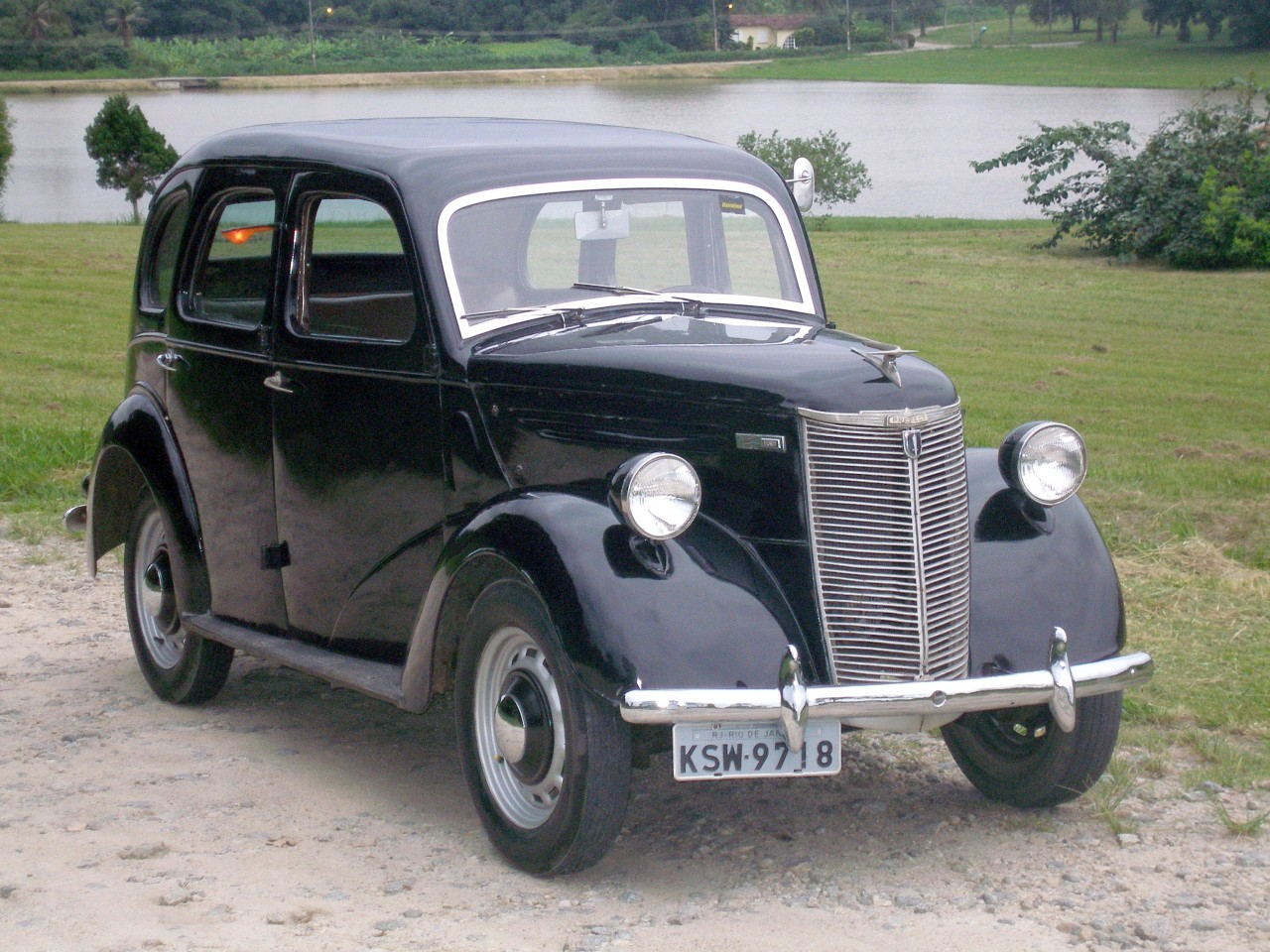
- 1948 Ford Prefect E93A Saloon

Overview
- Manufacturer: Ford UK; Ford Australia
- Production: 1938–1961

Chronology
- Predecessor: Ford 7W
- Successor: Ford Consul Classic

The Ford Prefect is a line of British cars which was produced by Ford UK between 1938 and 1961 as an upmarket version of the Ford Popular and Ford Anglia small family cars. It was introduced in October 1938 and remained in production until 1941. Returning to the market in 1945, it was offered until 1961. The car progressed in 1953 from its original perpendicular or "sit-up-and-beg" style to a more modern three-box structure. Some versions were also built and sold by Ford Australia.

Like its siblings, the car became a popular basis for a hot rod, especially in Britain, where its lightweight structure and four-cylinder engines appealed to builders.

== E93A (1938–1949) ==
Ford Prefect E93A
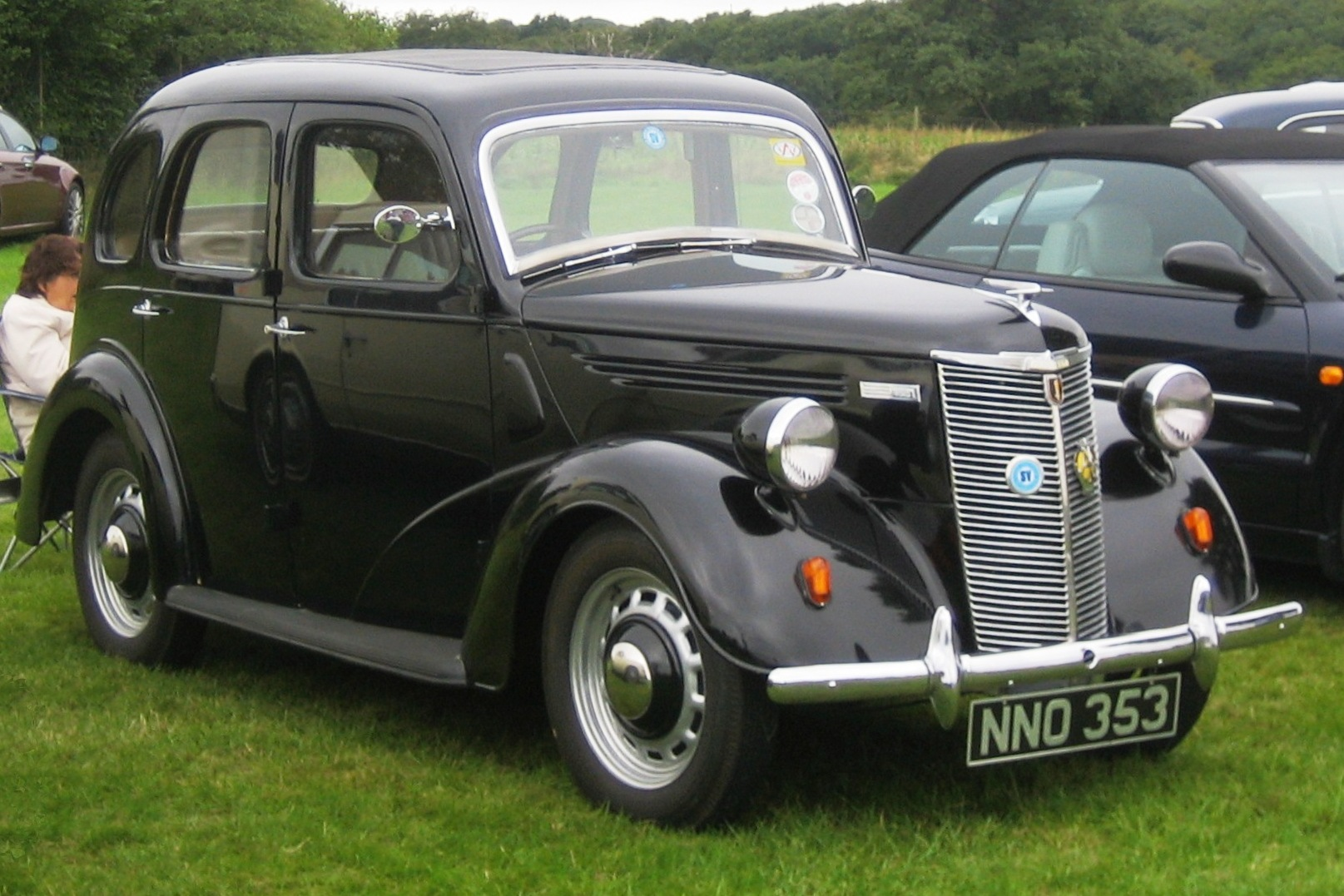
- 1948 Ford Prefect E93A 4 door Saloon

Overview
- Production: 1938–1949
- Assembly: United Kingdom: Dagenham; Australia: Geelong

Body and chassis
- Body style: 2-door saloon 4-door saloon 2-door tourer 2-door drophead coupé 2-door van (Australia); 2-door coupé utility (Australia); 2-door roadster utility (Australia)
- Related: Ford Anglia; Ford Popular

Powertrain
- Engine: 1172 cc Ford Sidevalve engine
- Transmission: 3-speed manual

Dimensions
- Wheelbase: 87 in (2,210 mm)
- Length: 151 in (3,835 mm)
- Width: 61 in (1,549 mm)
- Height: 63.5 in (1,613 mm)
- Curb weight: 1,845 lb (837 kg)

The Ford Prefect was introduced in October 1938 and built by the Ford plant in Dagenham, Essex. The original Ford Prefect was a slight reworking of the previous year's 7W, the first Ford car designed outside of Detroit, Michigan. It was designed specifically for the British market. It had a 1,172 cc (71.5 cu in) side-valve engine with thermosiphon cooling system (no pump) and with many other cars of the period, the ability to be started by a crank handle should the battery not have sufficient energy to turn the 6-volt starter motor. The windscreen wipers were powered by the vacuum ported from the engine intake manifold — as the car laboured uphill the wipers would slow to a standstill due to the intake manifold vacuum dropping to near nil, only to start working again as the top was reached and the intake vacuum increased. The windscreen opened forward pivoting on hinges on the top edge; two flaps either side of the scuttle also let air into the car. The car has a durable four-cylinder motor.

The most common body styles were two- and four-door saloons, but pre-war a few tourers and drophead coupés were made. Post-war, only four-door saloons were available on the home market, but two-door models were made for export.

41,486 were made up to 1941 and a further 158,007 between 1945 and 1948.

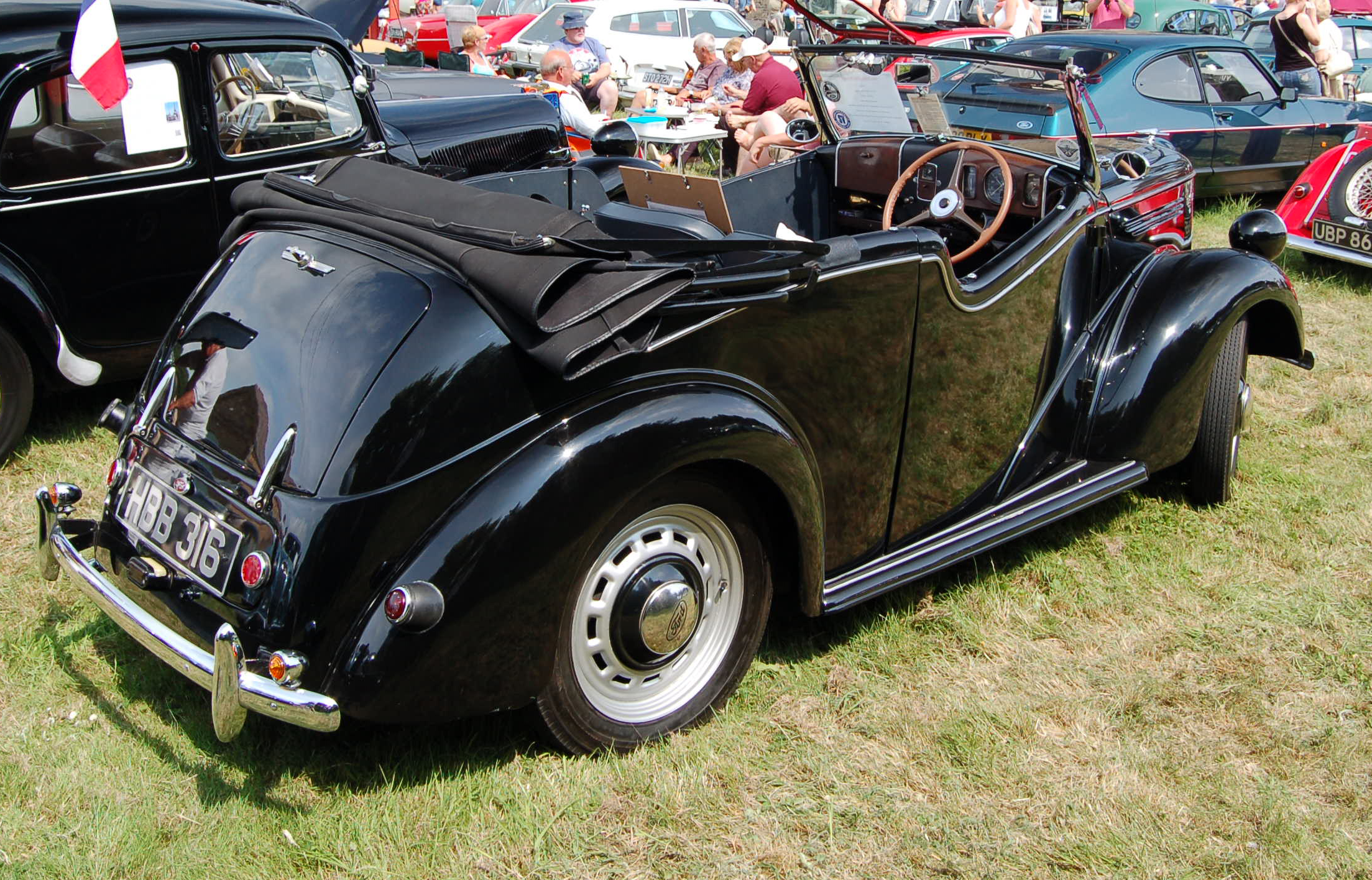
1939 Ford Prefect E93A Tourer

=== Australian production ===
The E93A was also produced in Australia with the Australian-built four-door saloon having an all-steel roof. Two-door saloon, tourer, 5cwt panel van, coupé utility and roadster utility models were also produced. In late 1939 the Australian Prefect models were recoded to E03A.

== E03A (Australia: 1939–1945) ==
Ford Prefect E03A
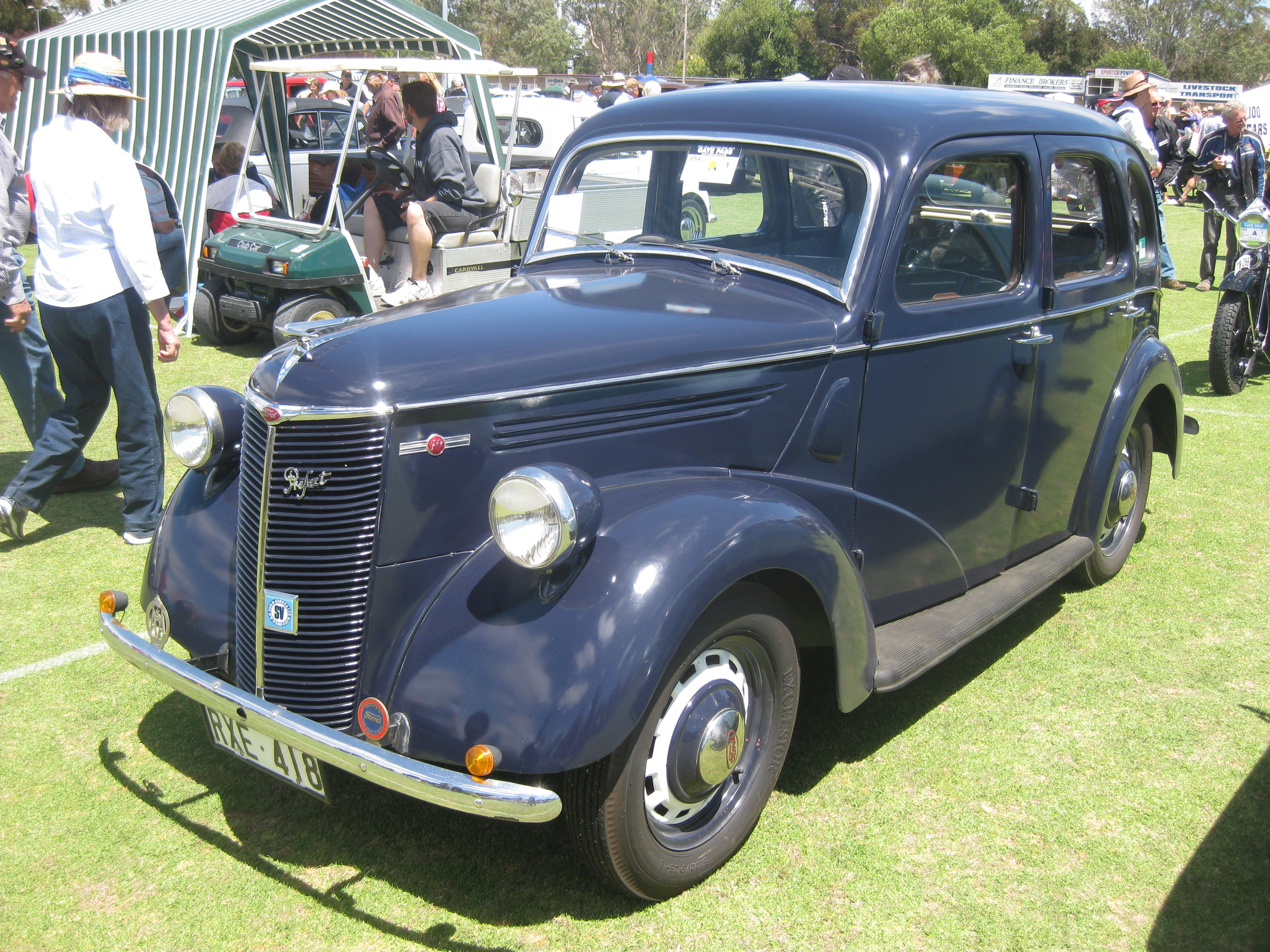
- 1939 Ford Prefect E03A 4 door Saloon

Overview
- Production: 1939–1945
- Assembly: Australia

Body and chassis
- Body style: 2-door saloon 4-door saloon 2-door tourer 2-door coupé utility 2-door roadster utility 2-door van

Powertrain
- Engine: 1172 cc Ford Sidevalve engine

The E03A replaced the E93A in Australian production in 1939. The E03A saloon differed from the English E93A saloon in having an all-steel roof and stainless steel waistline trim.

== A53A (Australia: 1946–1948) ==
Ford Prefect A53A
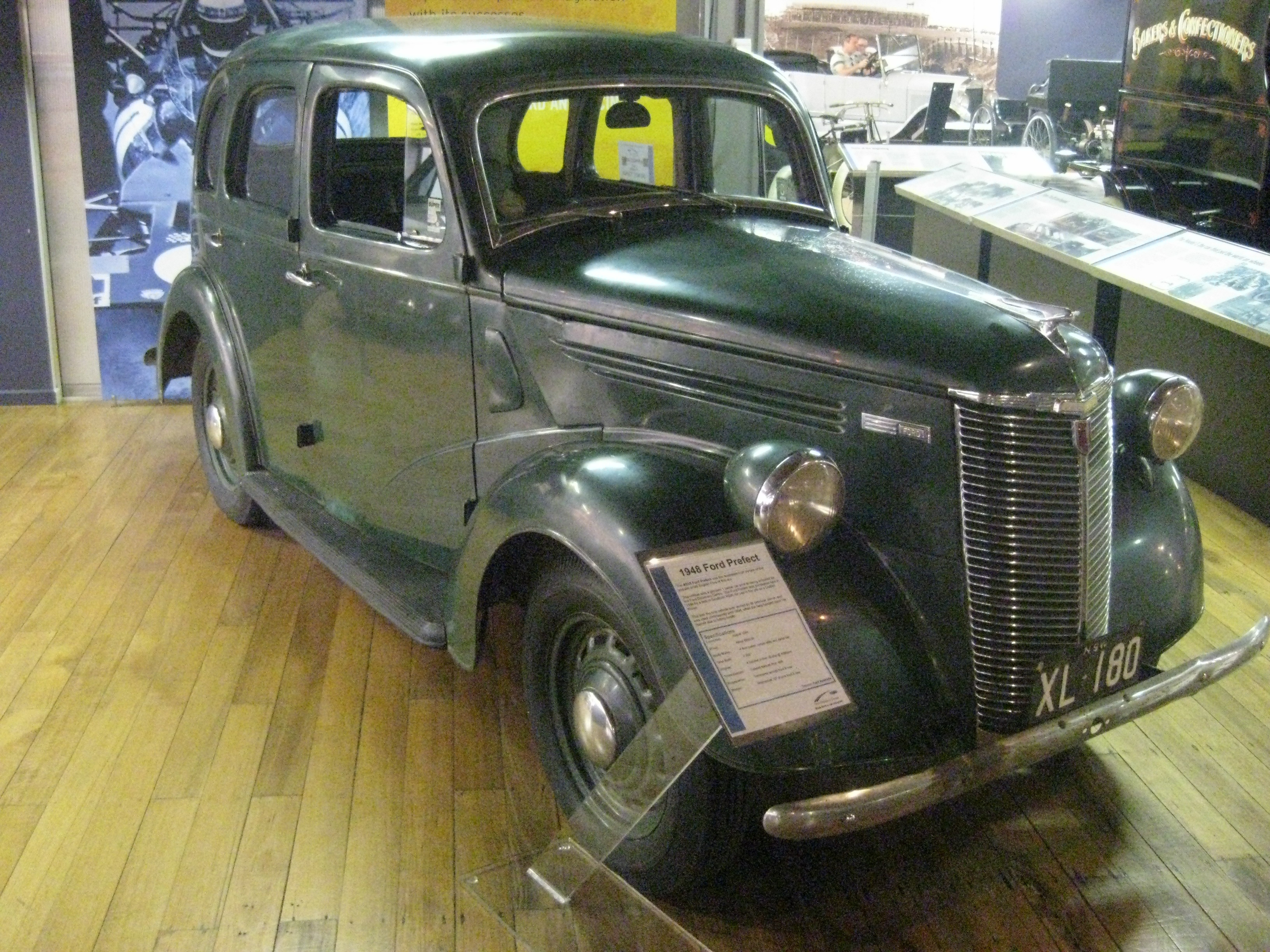
- Ford Prefect A53A 4 door Saloon

Overview
- Production: 1946–1948
- Assembly: Australia

Body and chassis
- Body style: 4-door saloon 2-door coupé utility 2-door van

Powertrain
- Engine: 1172 cc Ford Sidevalve engine

The A53A replaced the E03A in Australian production in 1946 with 4-door saloon, coupé utility and 5cwt delivery van versions produced. The A53A saloon differed from the E03A saloon in having an extended boot. From October 1947 the grille slates were chrome-plated.

== E493A (1949–1953) ==
Ford Prefect E493A
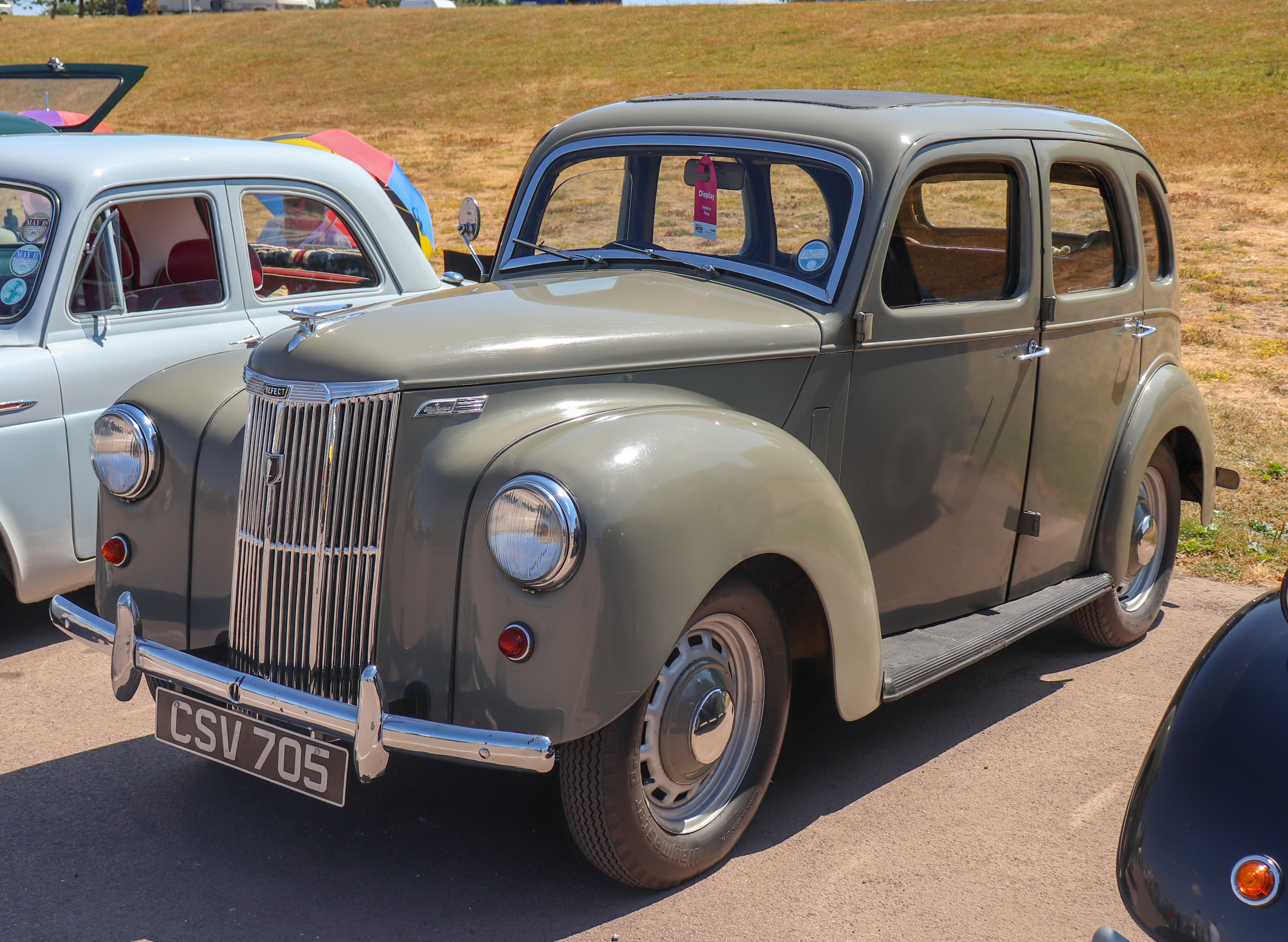

Overview
- Production: 1949–1953
- Assembly: United Kingdom: Dagenham; Australia: Geelong

Body and chassis
- Body style: 4-door saloon

Powertrain
- Engine: 1172 cc Ford Sidevalve engine
- Transmission: 3-speed manual

Dimensions
- Wheelbase: 94 in (2,388 mm)
- Length: 151 in (3,835 mm)
- Width: 61 in (1,549 mm)
- Height: 63.5 in (1,613 mm)

Post war, the Prefect design changed little until replaced in 1952. The headlamps moved into the wings and trafficators were fitted (internally lit semaphores springing out from the door pillars to signal left and right turns), though due to space restrictions these were left out on the Australian-built Ute. Only four-door saloons were available on the home market, the two-door sector being left to the Anglia but some were made for export.

The brakes remained mechanically operated using the Girling rod system with 10 in (250 mm) drums and the chassis still had transverse leaf springs front and rear.

A Prefect tested by the British magazine The Motor in 1948 had a top speed of 61 mph (98 km/h) and could accelerate from 0-50 mph (80 km/h) in 22.8 seconds. A fuel consumption of 33.2 miles per imperial gallon (8.5 L/100 km; 27.6 mpg_{‑US}) was recorded. The test car which had the optional leather upholstery cost £412 including taxes. In standard form, they commented that it was the cheapest 4-door car on the British market.

192,229 were made.

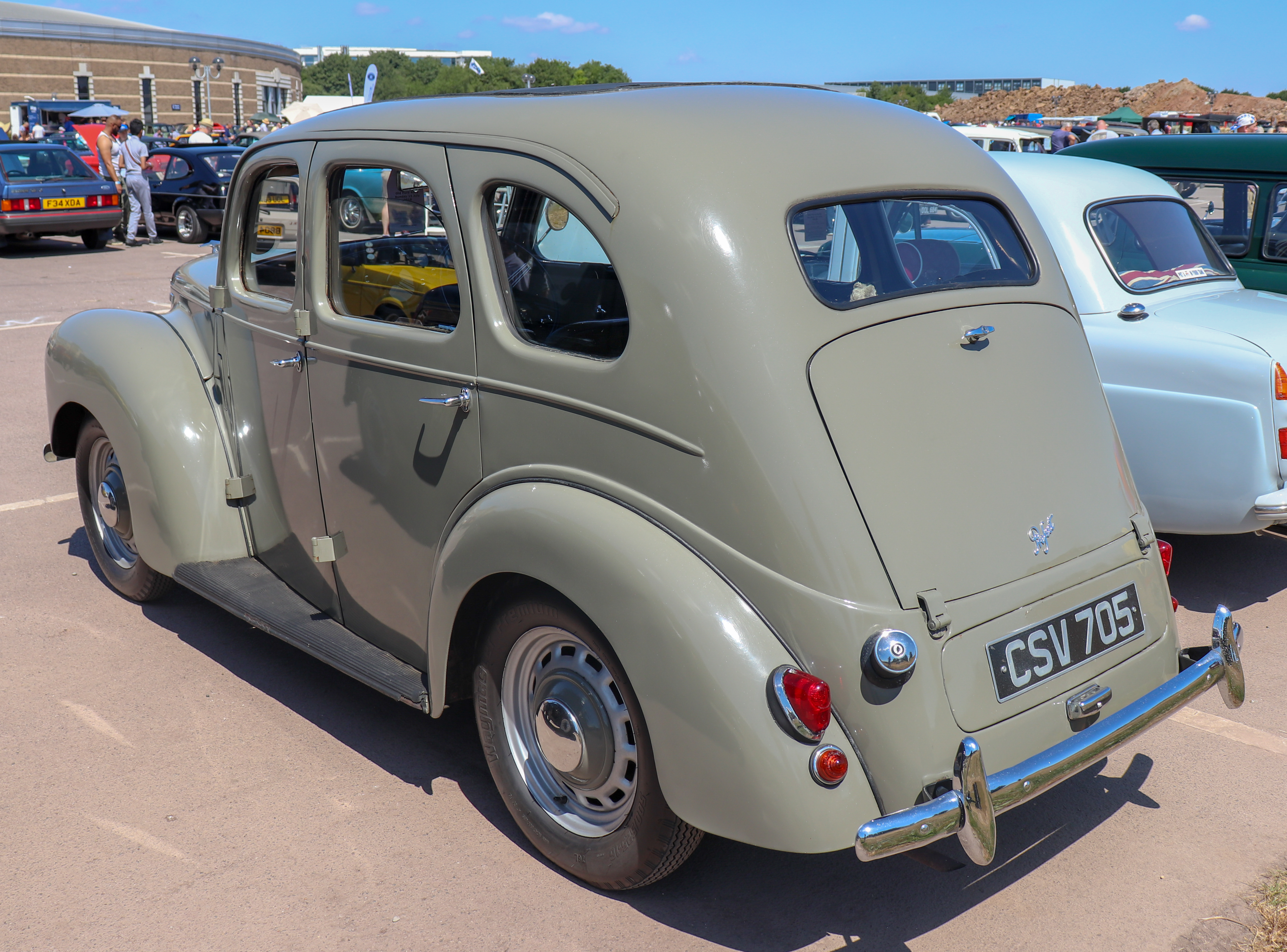
Rear

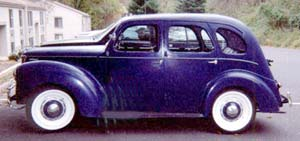
Canadian-market 1950 Prefect

== A493A (Australia: 1949–1953) ==
Ford Prefect A493A
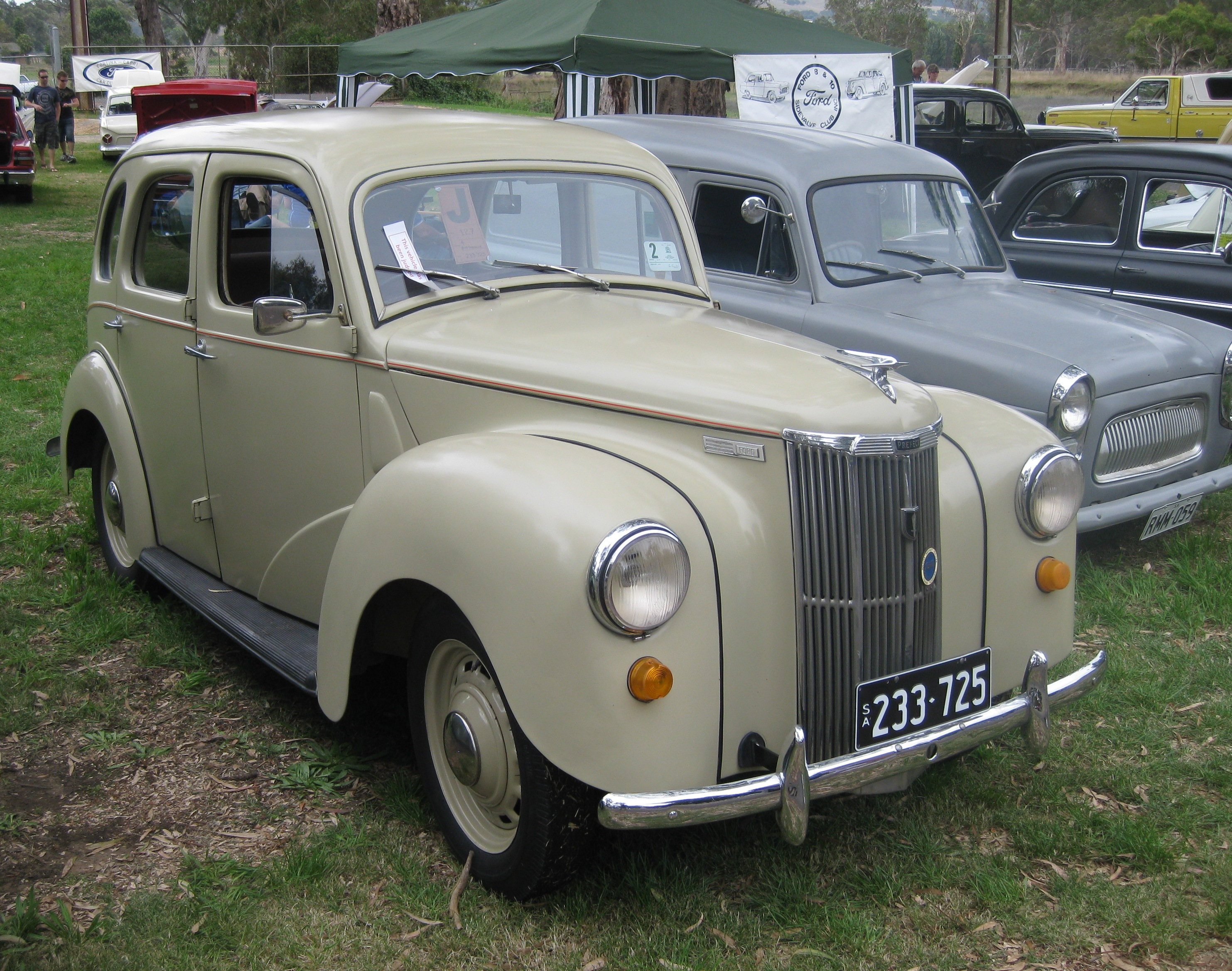
- Ford Prefect A493A 4-door Saloon

Overview
- Production: 1949–1953
- Assembly: Australia

Body and chassis
- Body style: 4-door saloon 2-door coupé utility

Powertrain
- Engine: 1172 cc Ford Sidevalve engine

The A493A was an Australian produced variant of the English E493A which was offered in 4-door saloon and coupe utility variants. The A493A saloon differs from the E493A saloon in having a solid roof, an extended boot and a swage line on the front doors.

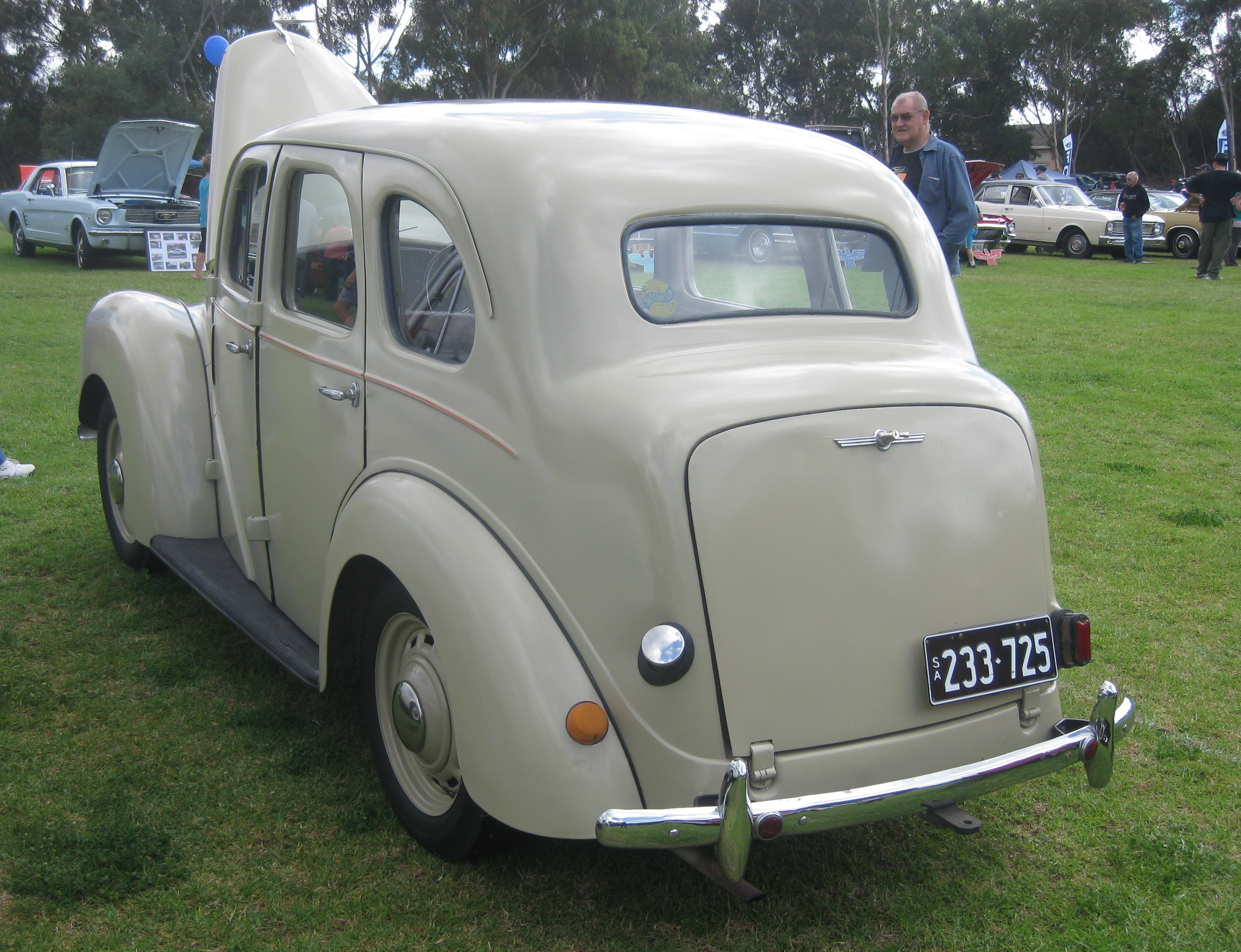
Ford Prefect A493A Saloon. This image shows the solid roof, extended boot and swage line on the front doors.

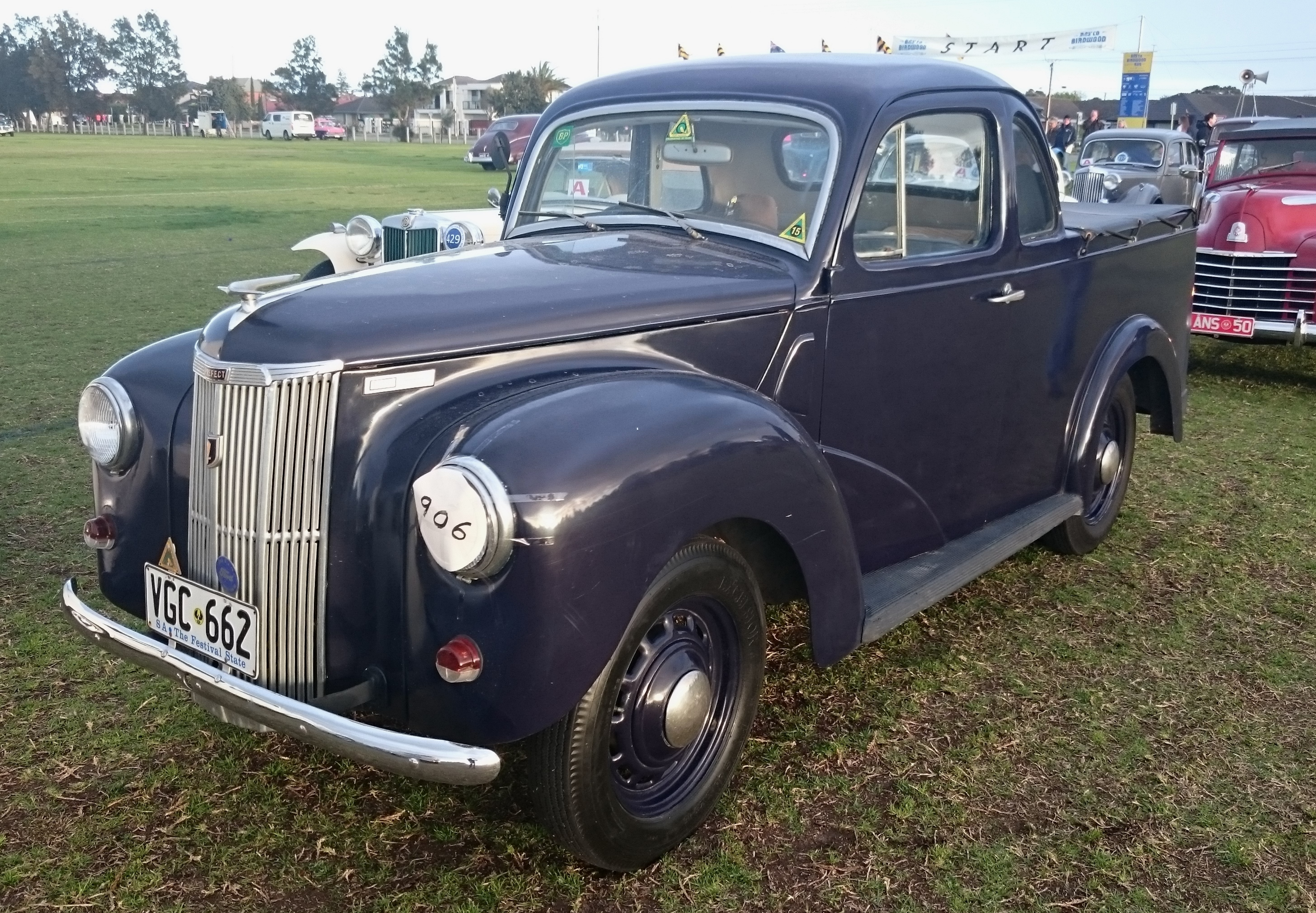
Ford Prefect Coupe Utility (A493A)

== 100E (1953–1959) ==
Ford Prefect 100E
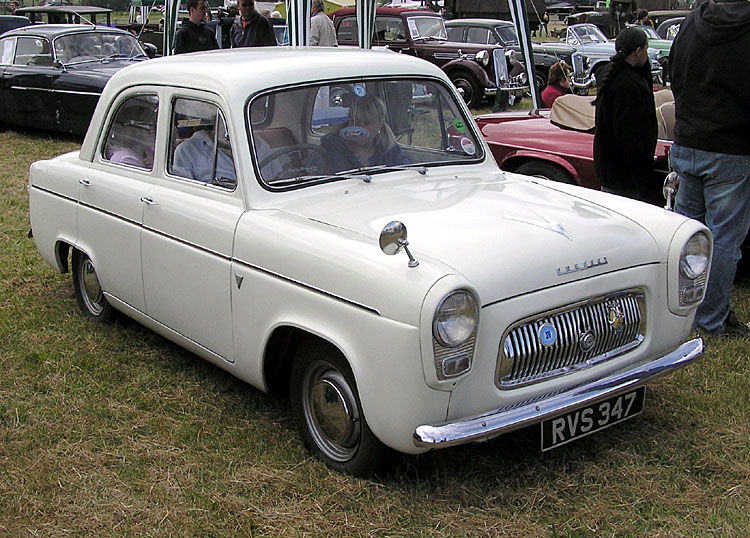

Overview
- Production: 1953–1959
- Assembly: United Kingdom: Dagenham; Ireland: Cork; Australia: Geelong; New Zealand: Lower Hutt; Singapore: Bukit Timah

Body and chassis
- Body style: 4-door saloon
- Related: Ford Anglia; Ford Popular; Ford Squire; Ford Escort; Thames 300E

Powertrain
- Engine: 1172 cc Ford Sidevalve engine
- Transmission: 3-speed manual

Dimensions
- Wheelbase: 87 in (2,210 mm)
- Length: 152 in (3,861 mm)
- Width: 57 in (1,448 mm)
- Height: 58.5 in (1,486 mm)

In 1953 a much redesigned Ford Prefect was introduced alongside the similar Ford Anglia and remained in production until 1959. Externally, the Prefect can be distinguished from the Anglia by having vertical bars on the radiator grille and four doors. The old separate chassis had gone, replaced by integral construction, and coil independent front suspension supplanted the transverse leaf spring. Girling hydraulic brakes were fitted, initially 7 in (180 mm) drums but quickly increased to 8 in (200 mm) A new side-valve engine of 1172 cc engine was fitted having the same bore, stroke and layout of the previous engine, but in all other respects completely different - changes included adjustable tappets, raising the compression ratio from 6.3:1 to 7:1 and larger inlet valves, resulting in the power output increasing by 20% to 36 bhp.

Inside there were separate front seats trimmed in PVC with leather as an option and two circular instruments in front of the driver one containing the speedometer and the other, fuel and water temperature gauges. De Luxe models from the second dashboard update in 1959 included glove box locks. The gear change was floor-mounted. The heater was an optional extra. The windscreen wipers were powered by the inlet manifold vacuum; when the engine was working hard, the vacuum fell away and the wipers slowed or stopped. The dashboard was revised twice; the binnacle surrounding the steering column was replaced by a central panel with twin dials towards the driver's side in 1956; the last from 1959 had twin dials in a binnacle in front of the driver and AC 'Vivid Arc' speedo similar to the 1957 E-series Vauxhall Velox/Cresta and '58/'59 PA models plus FB and EK Holdens.

In 1955 an estate car version was introduced, marketed as the Ford Squire and mechanically identical to the contemporary Escort, an estate car version of the Ford Anglia 100E, but with wooden strakes and a higher trim level.

The Motor magazine tested a de-luxe 100E in 1957 and recorded a top speed of 71 mph (114 km/h) and acceleration from 0-60 mph (97 km/h) in 32.2 seconds. A "touring" fuel consumption of 33.1 miles per gallon (imperial) was recorded. On the home market it cost £658 including taxes of £220. 100,554 were made.

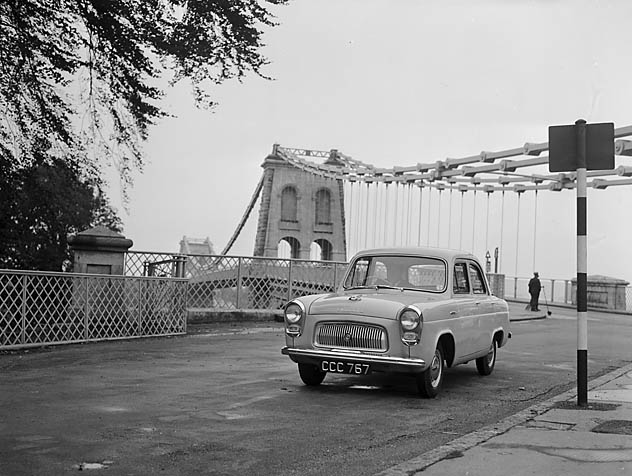
Ford Prefect 100E being road tested in 1954

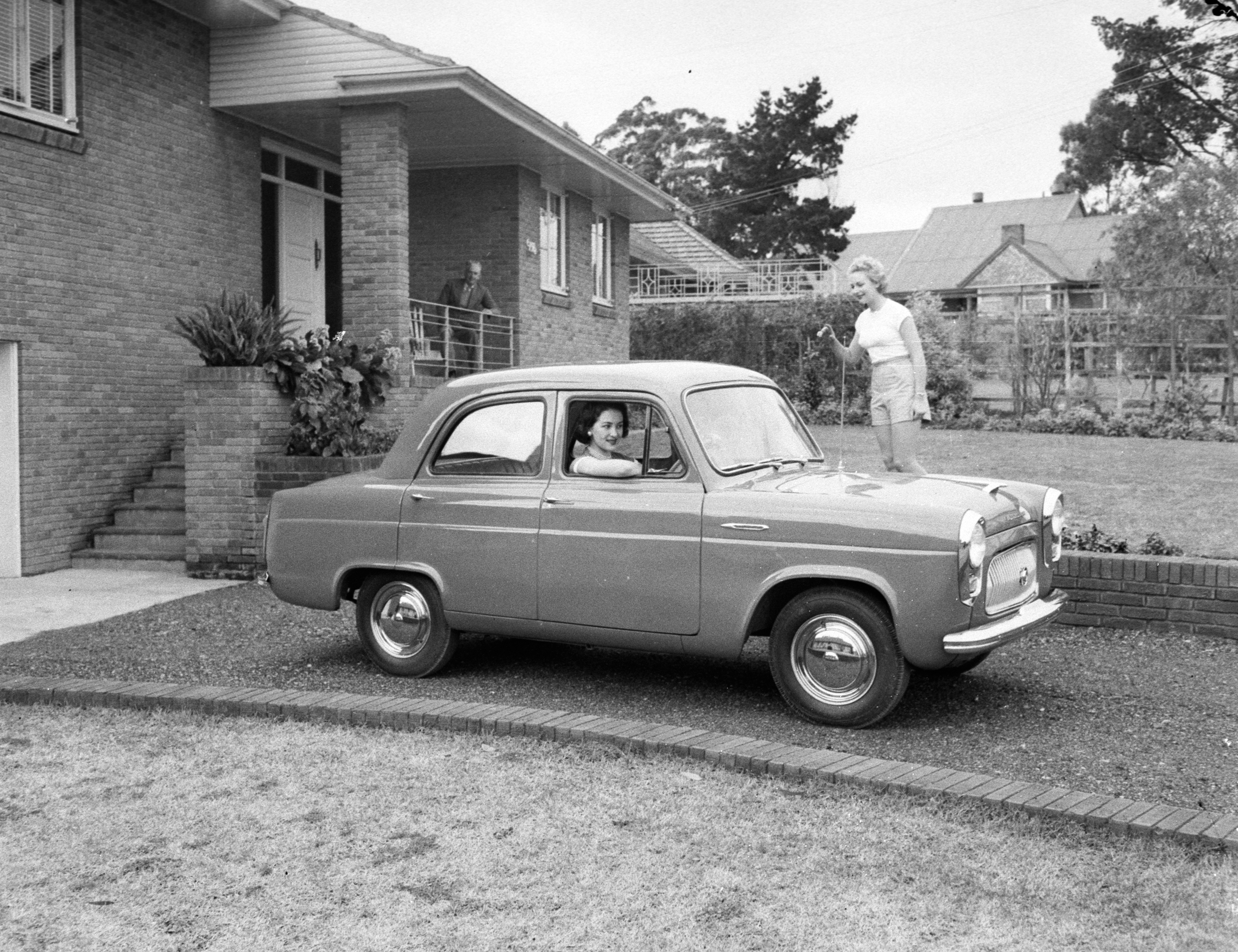
Ford Prefect car, Parramatta, Sydney, 1954

== 107E (1959–1961) ==
Ford Prefect 107E
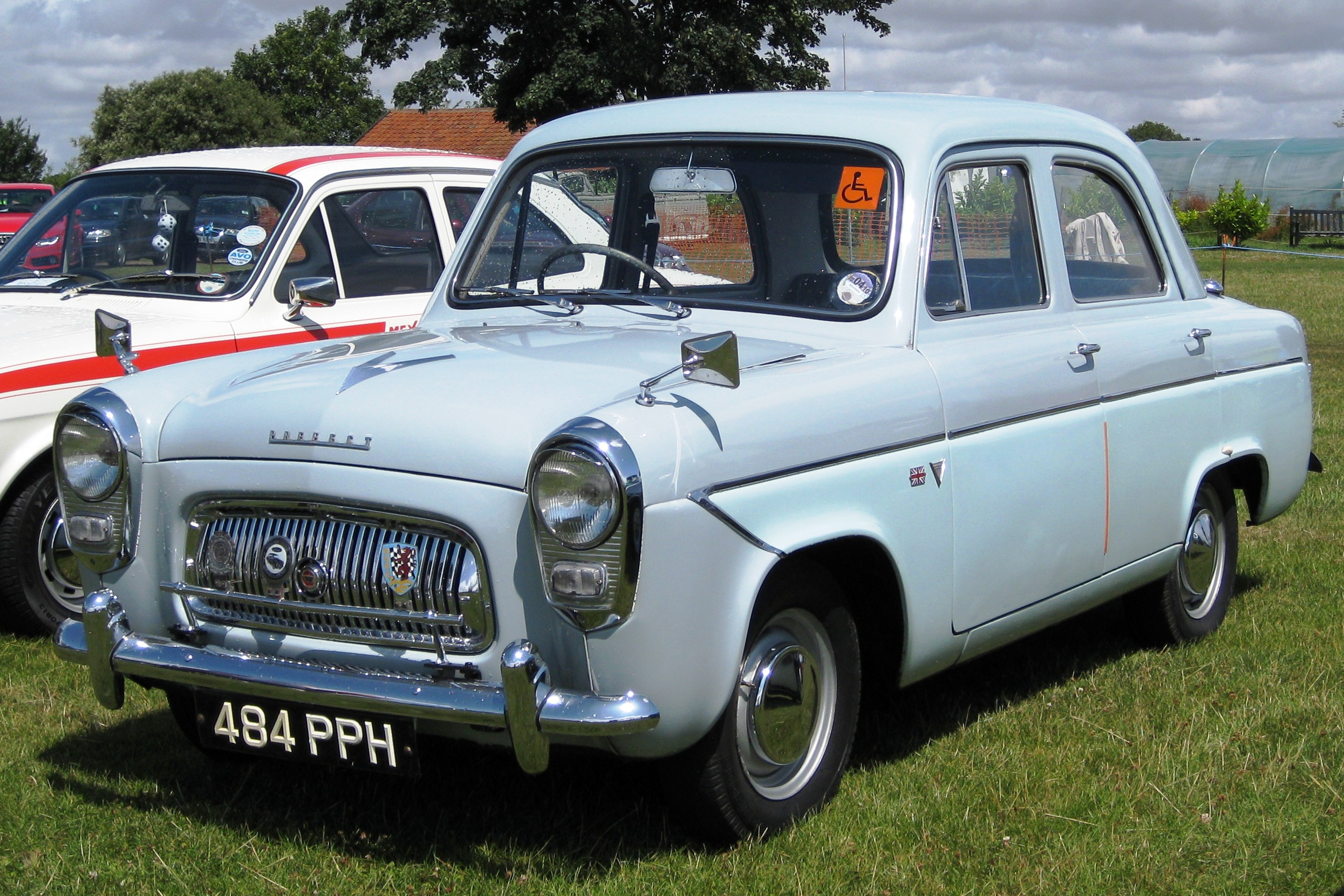

Overview
- Production: 1959–1961
- Assembly: United Kingdom: Dagenham; Australia: Geelong

Body and chassis
- Body style: 4-door saloon

Powertrain
- Engine: 997 cc (60.8 cu in) Ford Kent engine
- Transmission: 4-speed manual

Dimensions
- Wheelbase: 87 in (2,210 mm)
- Length: 150 in (3,810 mm)
- Width: 61 in (1,549 mm)

The Prefect 107E utilized a reworked 100E body with the then-new 997 cc (60.8 cu in) overhead valve engine, four-speed gearbox and 'banjo' style rear end from the Anglia 105E, produced to offer a four-door model until replaced by the Ford Consul Classic. 38,154 were made, most of them (in UK production) in a two-tone colour scheme and deluxe trim.

Deluxe versions assembled in New Zealand had a rare 'factory fitted' recirculating heater (dealer fit was almost universal at the time) and plush carpet.

Drum brakes of 8 in (200 mm) diameter were fitted, hydraulically operated, and the suspension was independent at the front using MacPherson struts. The rear driven axle used semi elliptic leaf springs. The steering mechanism used a worm and peg system.

On test, The Motor magazine recorded a top speed of 73 mph (117 km/h) and acceleration from 0-60 mph (97 km/h) in 27.2 seconds. A "touring" fuel consumption of 36 miles per gallon (imperial) was recorded. On the home market, it cost £621, including taxes of £183.

Optional extras included a heater, windscreen washers, radio and leather upholstery to replace the standard PVC.

== Exports and foreign production ==
In addition to the United Kingdom and Australia, Ford Prefects were also sold in the US, New Zealand (where they were locally assembled), Argentina and Canada. The Canadian model was left-hand drive. The Prefect was also license-built in Latvia by Ford-Vairogs as the Ford-Vairogs Junior. In Ireland, the Prefect was assembled at the Ford Cork plant until 1962. In South Africa, they were assembled locally at the Ford Struandale plant in Port Elizabeth. Singapore-based Ford of Malaya had also built the Prefect 100E with imported CKD kits.

== In popular culture ==
In the radio series, novelization, and film The Hitchhiker's Guide to the Galaxy by Douglas Adams, one of the main characters — an extra-terrestrial alien seeking to pose as a human — named himself "Ford Prefect" after the car because he believed it would be “nicely inconspicuous”.

Mohun Biswas, the main character in V. S. Naipaul's novel A House for Mister Biswas, purchased an early '50s Prefect as one of his few and prized possessions. It was a source of ridicule from family members but also representative of his limited upward mobility.

== See also ==
- List of Ford vehicles
