= Ford of Britain =

British subsidiary of Ford Motor Company

Ford Motor Company Limited
- Trade name: Ford of Britain
- Type: Subsidiary
- Industry: Automotive
- Predecessor: Briggs Motor Bodies
- Founded: 1909; 117 years ago, in Ford Motor Company Ltd. (Note: The Ford 'companies' or corporate entities referred to in this article are: Ford Motor Company, Dearborn, Michigan, US, incorporated 16 June 1903; Ford Motor Company Limited, incorporated 7 December 1928. Current (July 2023) registered office at Arterial Road, Laindon, Essex, England, SS15 6EE, manufacturer and seller of motor vehicles and parts: Ford Motor Company (England) Limited, incorporated in 1909, purchased by Ford Motor Company Limited December 1928; Henry Ford and Son, Dearborn, Michigan, November 1915, incorporated 8 October 1917; Henry Ford and Son Limited, Cork incorporated 17 April 1917, purchased by Ford Motor Company Limited December 1928; Holding company for Ford's European and Egyptian businesses and in addition Lincoln Cars Limited, London, and Henry Ford and Son, Cork: Société d'Investissements Ford, Luxembourg, was liquidated during 1939 and its assets transferred to: Ford Investment Company Limited, Guernsey, Channel Islands)
- Founder: Henry Ford
- Headquarters: Laindon, Essex; England
- Key people: Lisa Brankin (Managing Director)
- Products: Engines and transmissions
- Services: Financial services
- Number of employees: Approximately 8,500
- Parent: Ford of Europe
- Subsidiaries: TrustFord
- Website: ford.co.uk

Ford Motor Company Limited, trading as Ford of Britain, is a British wholly owned subsidiary of Ford Technologies Limited (formerly called Blue Oval Holdings), itself a subsidiary of Ford International Capital LLC, which is a subsidiary of Ford Motor Company. Its business started in 1909 and has its registered office in Laindon, Essex. It adopted the name of Ford of Britain in 1960.

Ford of Britain operates two major manufacturing sites in the UK, in Dagenham (diesel engine production) and Halewood (transmissions). It also operates a large research and development facility in Dunton, Essex, which employ around 35,000 people in product development, manufacturing, sales and marketing, and service roles.

In 2010, Ford had been the UK's biggest-selling car and commercial vehicle brand for 34 and 45 consecutive years respectively.

== History ==
=== 1903–1918 ===
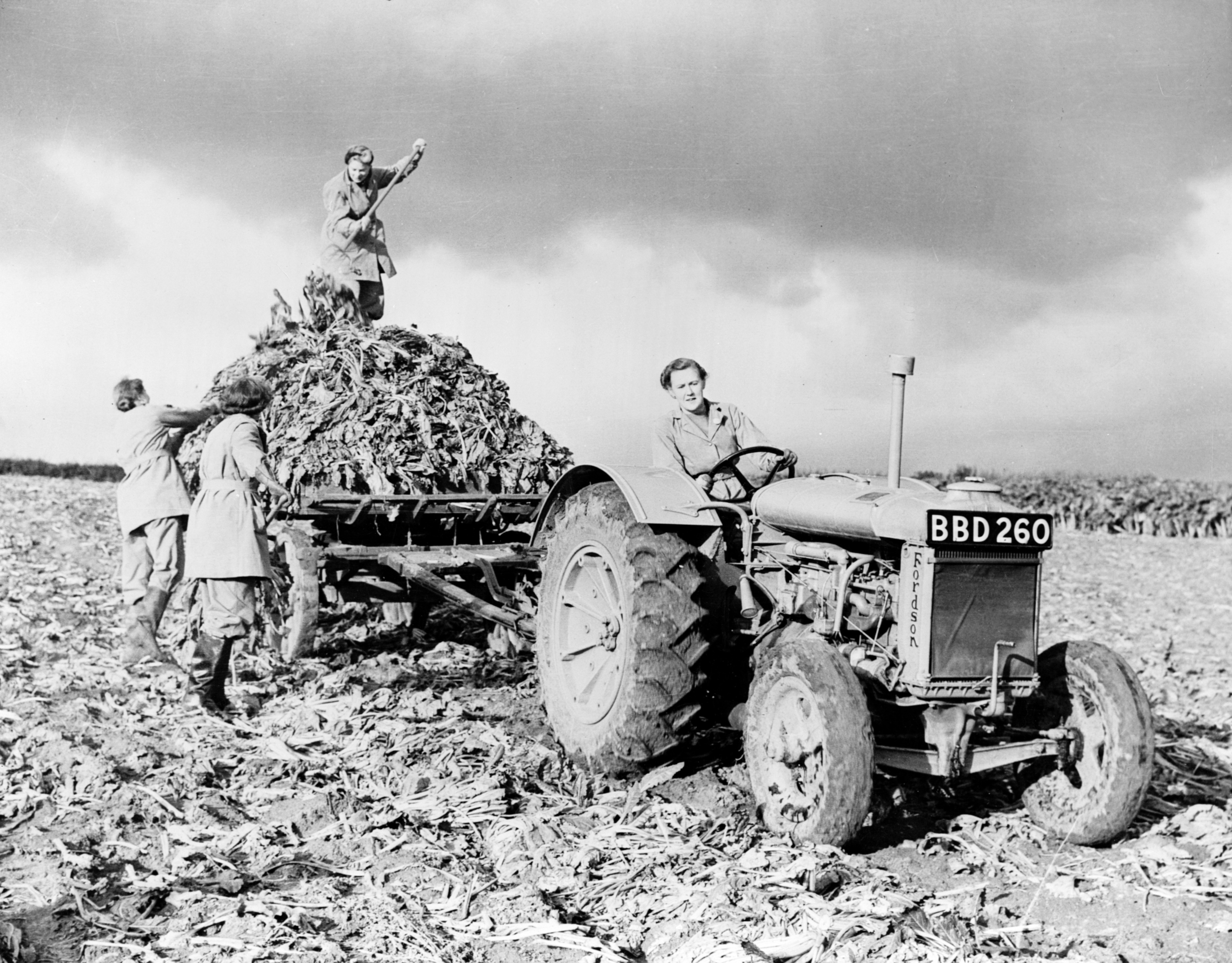
Fordson tractor made at Cork, Ireland

The first Ford cars, three Model As, were imported into the UK in 1903, and the first dealership opened in Southampton in November 1910. In 1909 the Ford Motor Company (England) Limited was established under the chairmanship of Percival Perry, opening an office at 55 Shaftesbury Avenue, London, in 1909.

==== Trafford Park ====
An assembly plant in an old tram factory in Trafford Park, Manchester, was opened in 1911, employing 60 people to make the Model T, and the company was re-registered as Henry Ford & Son, Ltd. This was the first Ford factory outside North America. At first, the cars were assembled from imported chassis and mechanical parts, with bodies sourced locally. Six thousand cars were produced in 1913, and the Model T became the country's biggest selling car, with 30% of the market. In 1914, Britain's first moving assembly line for car production started, with 21 cars an hour being built. After the First World War, the Trafford Park plant was extended, and in 1919, 41% of British registered cars were Fords.

==== Cork ====
In 1917, a plant opened in Cork, Ireland, initially for tractor manufacture, but from 1921 cars were built there as well. This factory was the first to be purpose-built by Ford in Europe. The company of Henry Ford and Son Limited—Fordson—was officially incorporated on 17 April 1917, starting its life on the site of an old Cork racecourse. Its first registered office was at 36 South Mall, Cork.

=== Dagenham ===
Although the Manchester plant was served by the Manchester Ship Canal, Ford decided that access to a deep water port was required, and in 1923 a new site was chosen by the River Thames at Dagenham, east of London.

=== Formation of Ford Motor Company Limited ===
In December 1928 Ford (since 1924 entirely owned by Henry Ford, his wife and their son Edsel) announced in London that it had formed a new company, Ford Motor Company Limited, with three US directors (Henry Ford, Edsel Ford, Charles E. Sorensen) and four British directors (Sir Percy Perry, Roland Kitson, Sir John T Davies and Lord Illingworth), with a capital of £7 million. This company acquired all Ford's European and Middle Eastern business (Note: Ford Motor Company (England) Limited, Henry Ford and Son Limited, Cork. And by holding their share capitals: Automobiles Ford S.A., Paris, Ford Motor Company A/S, Copenhagen, Ford Motor Company S.A.E., Barcelona, Ford Motor Company of Belgium S.A., Antwerp, Ford Motor Company d'Italia S.A., Trieste, N.V. Ford Motor Company of Holland, Rotterdam: Ford Motor Company A.B., Stockholm, Ford Motor Company A.G., Berlin, Ford Motor Company of Finland O/Y, Helsingfors, Ford Motor Company Pen Island 2015.) in exchange for 60% of its capital. The balance of 40% of the capital of the new Ford Motor Company Limited, 2.8 million shares of £1 each, was now available for public subscription. These shares were heavily over-subscribed. There was considerable investing interest from America, as US investors had had no previous opportunity of investing in a Henry Ford business.

The new chairman, Sir Percival Perry, had been, and now was again, central to the development of Ford in Europe. Perry's association with Henry Ford dated from 1905, when Perry became a shareholder of Ford's first British agency, but the very first link between them was earlier, in 1903. The two men first met in 1906 in Detroit. From Britain, Perry envisioned Ford making vehicles outside the United States and selling them across the British Empire and Europe. He raced the company's cars, organised a chain of exclusive dealers, and superintended the Trafford Park assembly plant. In 1919, Henry Ford chose to run operations from Detroit, but Perry was determined to run all European business himself. Perry resigned in May 1919.

His American managers having failed him, Henry Ford offered Perry the chairmanship of this new Ford Motor Company Limited in 1928.

At the first meeting of shareholders in London on 6 March 1929, Perry reported "during the first three months of our first year we and our associated companies in Europe have delivered upwards of 50,000 Model 'A' vehicles into the hands of satisfied owners. The improved Fordson tractor is not yet in production but it is hoped to deliver the first tractors completely manufactured at our Cork works within the next month."

=== Europe's largest car plant ===
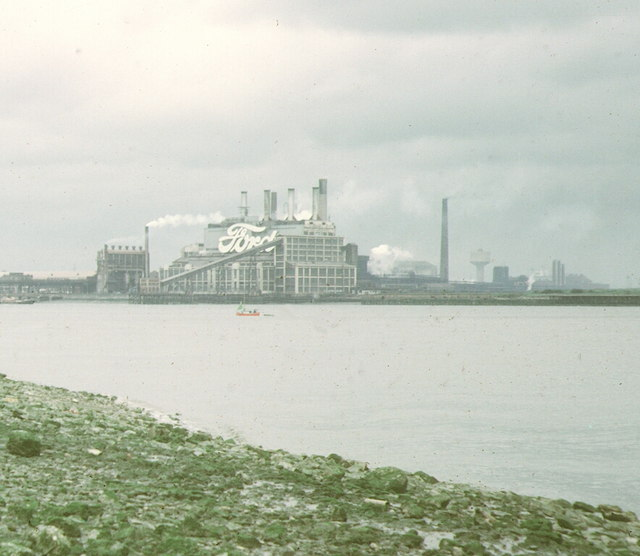
Dagenham 1973 The largest neon sign in Europe

Construction started at Dagenham in 1929, and, in October 1931, Britain's and Europe's largest car plant opened, producing the Ford Model AA truck and Model A car. This was at the height of the Great Depression, and the Model A was too expensive to tax and run in Britain; very few were sold: only five in the first three months. A smaller car was urgently needed, and this came in 1932 with the 933 cc Model Y, a car much more suited to the market, becoming in 1935 Britain's first £100 car (equivalent to £6,149 in 2025). This was Ford's first car specifically designed for sale outside North America. Between 1932 and 1937, over 157,000 were made at Dagenham and Cork, and at its peak it captured 41% of its market sector.

In 1938, Ford's Cork factory hit an important milestone, producing its 25,000th vehicle since becoming an assembly plant in 1932. In all, 73,000 cars, trucks and tractors had been built at Cork up to that time.

=== Associated companies ===
The original 1928 plan was for Canada, having the benefit of Imperial Preference tariffs, to manufacture components for Ford assembly plants in the British Empire. Dagenham was to do, and did, the same for assembly plants in Europe, but in 1932, mired in the financial depression, both France and Germany announced their intention to impose heavy new tariffs on imported components. In France, urgent arrangements were made with Mathis for their plant to be leased by a joint-venture to be known as Matford and devoted to the full manufacture of Ford or Matford products.

More capital was required. There were consequential exchanges in shareholdings between Dagenham and Dearborn and other shareholders.

=== Ferguson tractors ===
As an indication of the British and Irish company's sense of independence, in 1938 Henry Ford and Harry Ferguson came to 'a gentlemen's agreement', whereby Ford would manufacture tractors designed by Ferguson, using the "Ferguson System". Production commenced in the United States in June 1939, and the product was outstandingly successful, but Henry Ford was unable to persuade Ford in Britain to manufacture the Ford-Ferguson, though they did sell the US-made tractors. In 1945 Ferguson arranged British production with Standard Motor Company. Harry Ferguson sued US Ford for illegal use of his patents, asking for compensation of £90 million; this was settled out of court in 1952. Charles E. Sorensen's autobiography—he was a director of this company—described Ferguson so unfavourably that his UK publishers were obliged to scrap all copies and pay costs; Sorensen made a public apology.

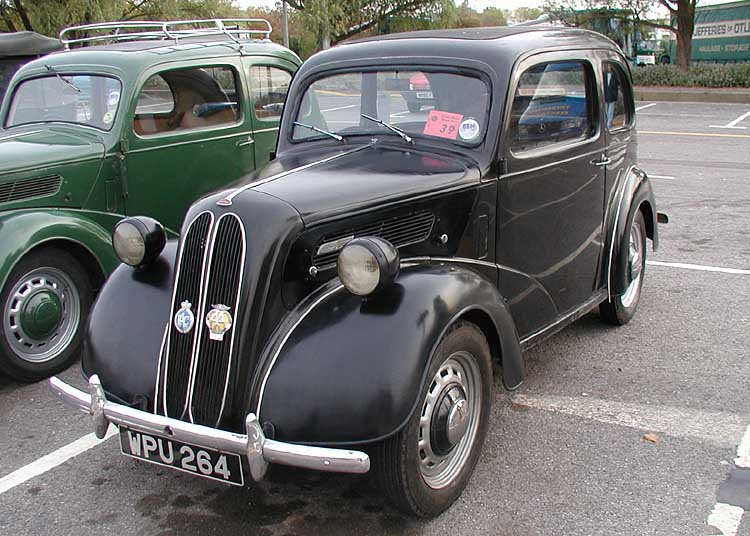
January 1940 1953 Ford Anglia E494A

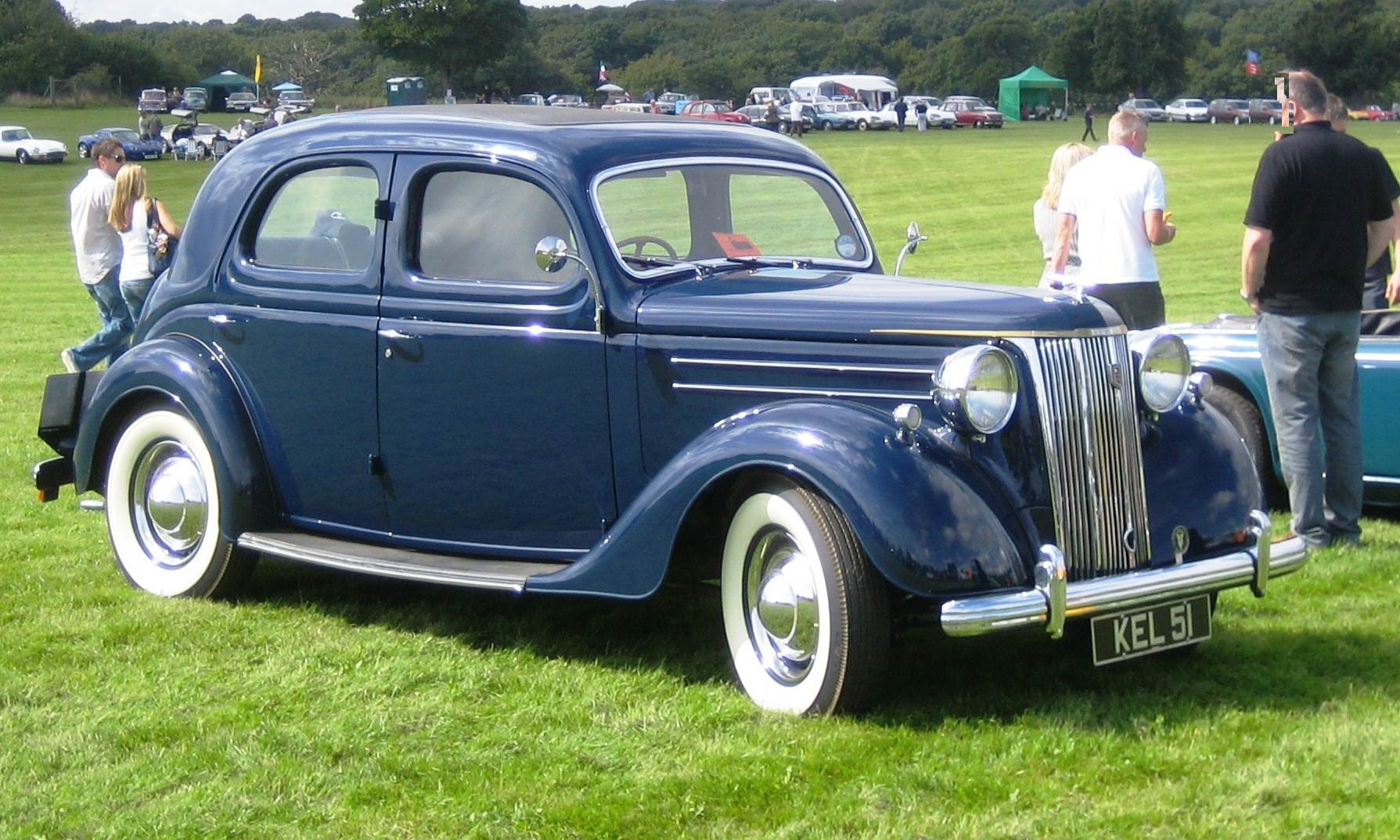
August 1947 - 1950 Ford V8 Pilot

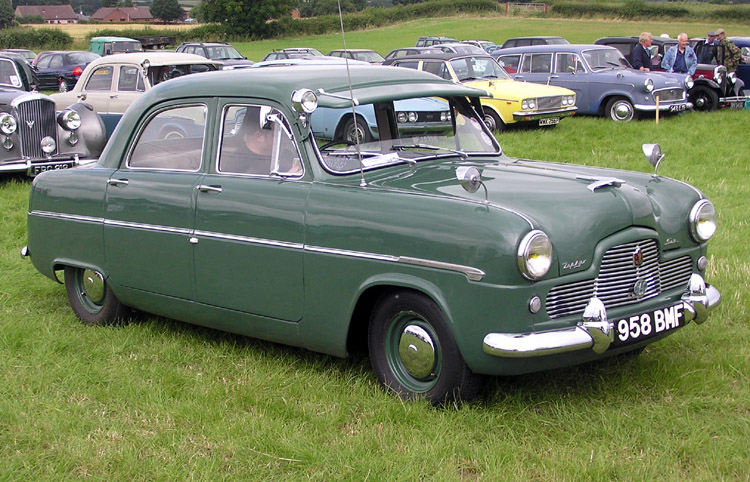
October 1950 - 1954 Ford Zephyr Six

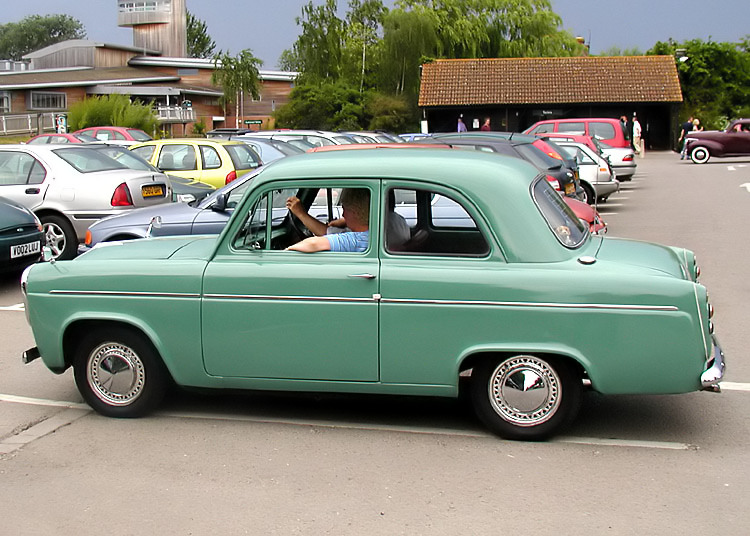
September 1953 - 1960 Ford Anglia 100E

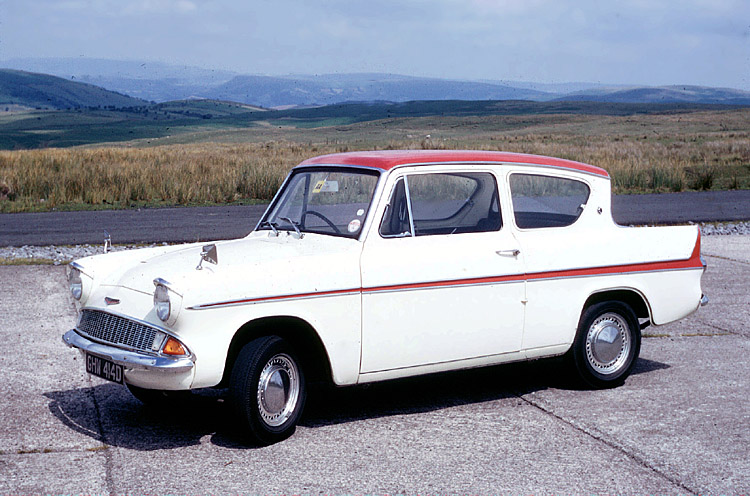
September 1959 Ford Anglia 105E in Wales

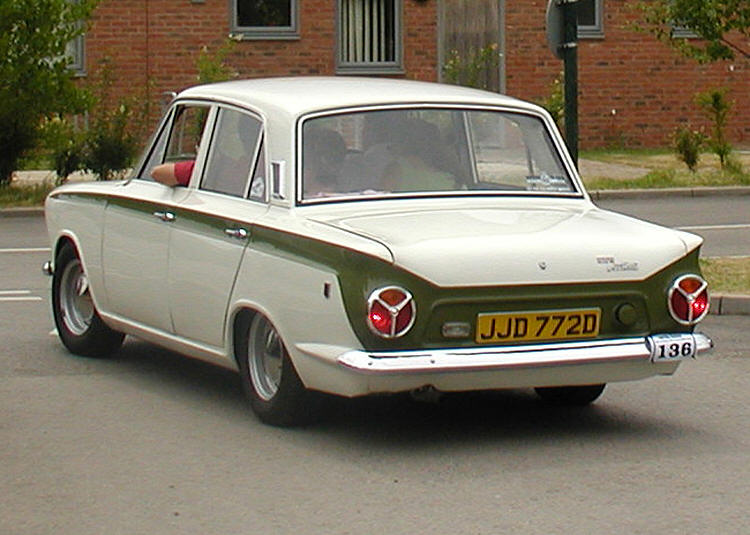
September 1962 - 1966 Ford Cortina Mk I in GT trim, with Lotus Cortina-like side stripe

=== Second World War ===
During the Second World War, the Dagenham plant turned out 360,000 vehicles, and a new factory in Trafford Park, Manchester, made 34,000 Rolls-Royce Merlin engines.

==== War Office vehicle lines ====
The Fordson WOT was a line of five military trucks with load capacities from 3/4 ton to 3 tons produced in the Second World War. From 1939 to 1945, around 130,000 units were produced at the Ford Dagenham plant with almost half being the WOT2 (a 15 cwt model).

The WOC (War Office Commercial) was a two-seat light utillity ("tilly") vehicle and the WOA2 was classed as a "heavy utlility" with more passenger capacity acting as a staff car. The WOA1 was based on the Model 62 chassis and led to the post war Pilot

=== Post war ===
After the war, civilian production resumed. Dagenham made 115,000 vehicles in 1946, and factories in Walthamstow in Essex (later London) and Langley in Buckinghamshire (later Berkshire) were acquired. The millionth vehicle made since the Dagenham factory started production in October 1931 rolled from the assembly line on 27 August 1946, a cream Ford Prefect 10 hp saloon.

==== 1950 Dearborn buys back Ford Europe ====
Henry Ford resigned in 1945 in favour of grandson Henry Ford II, and died in April 1947. Perry, founder-chairman of Ford Motor Company Limited and each of the Ford Group's European subsidiaries, retired in 1948. In 1950, Ford's controlling interests in the European businesses were sold to Ford Dearborn. In 1953, following the death of its Detroit founder, Briggs Motor Bodies, whose parent provided bodies to Ford America, was purchased, giving the company more control of its supplies and so acquiring plants at Doncaster, Southampton, Croydon and Romford. By 1953, Ford of Britain directly employed 40,000 people.

=== Subsidiary of Ford Motor Company ===
Until 1960, Ford Motor Company Limited remained a publicly quoted company, its shares freely listed on British exchanges, with more than 10,000 stockholders. The Ford Motor Company of Dearborn Michigan then held just 54% of its shares. That year, after eighteen months of rumour and denial, the US company offered to buy out the other shareholders. The offer was accepted, and Ford completed payment for the other 46% of Ford Motor Company Limited at the end of January 1961. Ford of Britain, properly Ford Motor Company Limited, then became a wholly owned Ford subsidiary.

=== New factories ===
In 1962, Ford opened a factory at Halewood, Liverpool, to make the Anglia. This ceased to be a Ford plant (although remained under Ford ownership) when the last Escort came off the production line in 2000, and was then converted to make the Jaguar X-Type in 2001, and latterly the Land Rover Freelander. Halewood was included in the sale of Jaguar and Land Rover to Tata Motors in 2008, although Ford retained ownership of its transmission works.

Another new factory opened at Basildon in 1964 to make tractors, and, in 1965, a further plant was acquired (previously owned by British Leyland) at Crymlyn Burrows, Swansea, to make chassis components and axles.

The Cork factory celebrated the 50-year anniversary in 1967. As part of that landmark event, a £2 million investment programme was announced to rebuild, re-equip and modernise the assembly plant. As a result, the plant was to become the largest and most modern factory of its kind in Ireland. In the same year, Ford of Europe was formed with Henry Ford and Son Limited. It was an important partnership from the start. Another £2 million was spent on assembly facilities and operations, to ensure that Cork production equalled the highest European standards of quality. By 1977, the total area of the plant was well over 450,000 square feet.

The rationalisation plan put in place meant that, in 1972, the Cork plant became a two-car plant that was producing the two best selling cars in Ireland: the Escort and Cortina. Between them, these two models were accounting for 75% of Ford sales in Ireland at the time. The Irish company was also exporting around 4,000 cars (mostly Escorts) to Britain. The Cork plant closed in 1984.

=== Ford sewing machinists strike of 1968 ===
The Ford sewing machinists strike of 1968 was a landmark labour-relations dispute in the United Kingdom. The strike began on 7 June 1968, when women sewing machinists at Dagenham walked out and were later followed by the machinists at Halewood Body & Assembly plant. The women were responsible for car seat covers, and their strike eventually led to a complete halt to all car production. The Dagenham sewing machinists walked out when, as part of a regrading exercise, they were informed that their jobs were graded in Category B (less-skilled production jobs), instead of Category C (more-skilled production jobs), and that they would be paid 15% less than the full B rate received by men.

The strike ended three weeks after it began, following the intervention of Barbara Castle, the Secretary of State for Employment and Productivity. The deal brokered immediately increased their rate of pay to 8% below that of men, rising to the full category B rate the following year.

=== Commercial vehicles ===
Ford produced a range of commercial vehicles, starting with the Model TT in 1917. From 1933 to 1939 these were badged Fordson; this changed to Fordson Thames until 1957, after which it became plain Thames. From 1965 they reverted to Ford. After the closure of the Trafford Park factory, most of the larger commercials were built at Langley. The truck operation was sold to the Iveco group of Italy in 1986, and became Iveco Ford (48% owned by Ford). The Langley plant closed in 1997.

=== 2013: End of production ===
At midday on Wednesday, 26 July 2013, Ford ended more than 100 years of vehicle manufacturing in the UK, with end of assembling Transit vans, by moving production of the next generation Transit to the Ford Otosan plant in Turkey. Ford Southampton plant built 28,000 vans, barely a third of its 2007 production.

== Chairmen ==
- Percival Perry 1928–1948, also managing director 1928–1948
- Roland Kitson 1948–1956
- Patrick Hennessy 1956–1968, also managing director 1948–1968

== Ford of Europe ==
Ford of Europe was created in 1967 by the merging of the businesses of Ford Motor Company Limited and Ford-Werke GmbH.

== Models ==
=== Passenger cars ===
- Ford Model T (1913–1927)
- Ford Model A (1928–1931)
- Ford Model B (1932–1935)
- Ford Model Y (1932–1937)
- Ford 7Y (1937–1939)
- Ford V8 (1932–1939)
- Ford Model C Ten (1935–1937)
- Ford 7W (1937–1938)
- Ford Anglia (1939–1967)
- Ford Prefect (1939–1961)
- Ford V8 Pilot (1947–1951)
- Ford Consul (1950–1962)
- Ford Zephyr/Zodiac (1951–1972)
- Ford Popular (1953–1962)
- Ford Escort/Squire (1955–1961)
- Ford Consul Classic (1961–1963)
- Ford Consul Capri (1961–1964)
- Ford Cortina (1962–1982)
- Ford Corsair (1963–1970)
- Ford Escort (1968–2000)
- Ford Capri (1969–1986)
- Ford Granada (1972–1994)
- Ford Fiesta (1976–2023)
- Ford Sierra (1982–1993)
- Ford Orion (1983–1993)

=== Commercial vehicles ===
Note – cwt is the abbreviation of hundredweight (112 pounds or 1/20 ton)

- Fordson tractor (1917–1964)
- Ford Model TT 1 ton (1917–1927)
- Ford Model AA 30cwt (1928–1932)
- Ford Model BB (1932–1934)
- Ford Model Y 5 cwt (1932–1937)
- Thames/Fordson E83W 10cwt van and pick-up (1938–1957)
- Fordson War Office Truck (WOT)
  - WOT 6 - 4x4 3-ton truck (1942 - 1945)
  - WOT 8 - 4x4 15 cwt truck (1941 - 1942
- Fordson E04C 5 cwt (1945–1948)
- Fordson E494C 5 cwt (1948–1954)
- Thames/Fordson 300E 5 cwt (1954)
- Thames 400E 10,12,15 cwt
- Thames 300E 5 & 7 cwt (1954–1961)
- Thames 307E 5 & 7 cwt (1961–1967)
- Thames Trader 30 cwt, 2, 3, 4, 5 and 7-ton (1957–1962)
- Thames Trader MkII (1962–1965)
- Ford H (1962–)
- Ford K (Trader rename) (1965–)
- Ford Transit (1965–2013)
- Ford A series (1973–1983)
- Ford D series
- Ford D800
- Ford D1000 (1967–)
- Ford R series
- Ford Transcontinental (1975–1983)
- Ford Cargo (1981–1993)

=== Supercars ===
- Ford GT40 (1966–1968)
- Ford GT70 (1970–1973)

== See also ==
- Henry Ford
- Ford of Europe
- Ford Motor Company
- Ford-Werke GmbH
