= Ford Thames 307E =

Thames 307E
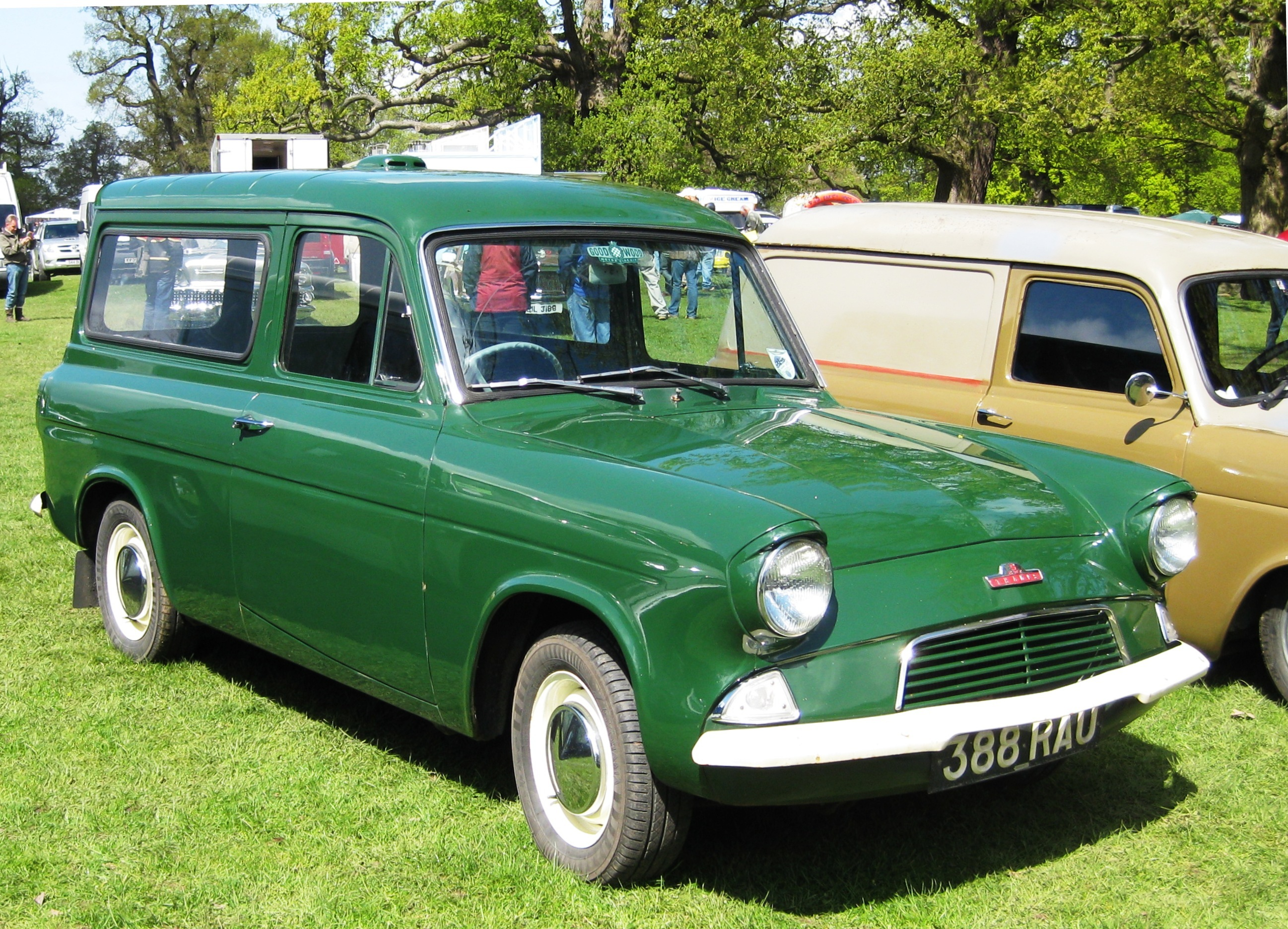
- 1962 Thames 307E 5 cwt van

Overview
- Manufacturer: Ford UK
- Production: 1961–1967
- Assembly: United Kingdom

Body and chassis
- Body style: 2-door panel van
- Layout: FR layout

Chronology
- Predecessor: Thames 300E
- Successor: Ford Escort Van

The Thames 307E is a small panel van launched by Ford UK in June 1961 and based on the recently introduced Ford Anglia 105E. It replaced the Thames 300E and, like its predecessor it was marketed as the Thames 5 cwt or the Thames 7 cwt van. These names defined, in Imperial measurements, the recommended maximum load weights (approximately equivalent to 250 and 350 kg respectively) of the vehicles. Advertised load space was 73 cubic feet (2,100 L) including 12 cubic feet (340 L) beside the driver.

The vans were introduced with a specially developed "commercial version" of the Anglia 105E engine, applying a compression ratio of 7.5:1 or, as an option, 8.9:1. The four speed gear box also came from the latest Anglia. The 5 and 7 cwt versions could be distinguished from the front by differing grille treatments. The base version had a grille of painted horizontal slats similar to that on the basic Anglia while the 7 cwt featured a full-width bright-meshed metal grille reminiscent of the Anglia deluxe.

Left hand drive export versions of the 307E were designated Thames 308E. The Anglia name was used for certain export markets.

== Thames 309E ==
From October 1962 the 5cwt and 7cwt vans were also offered with the 1198cc engine from the Ford Anglia Super and these were designated as Thames 309E. Left hand drive export versions of the 309E were designated Thames 310E.

== Ford Anglia Van ==
In March 1965 the use of the Thames name was discontinued and from that time Anglia-based vans were marketed as Ford Anglia Vans.

Production ended in November 1967 with a total of 205,001 vans having been produced.

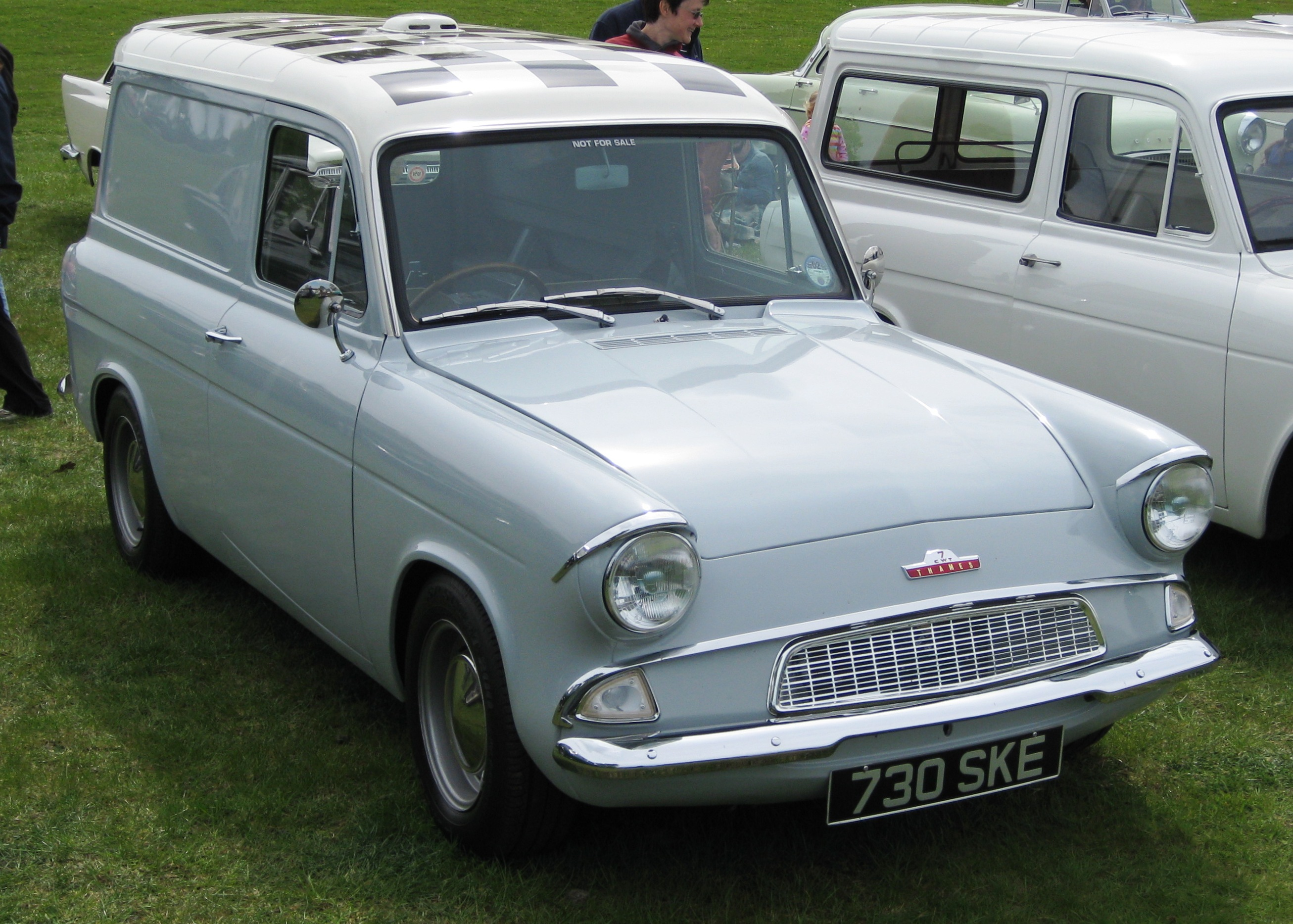
Thames 307E 7 cwt Van. This particular example has a Zetec engine fitted and is known as Project Table Cloth.

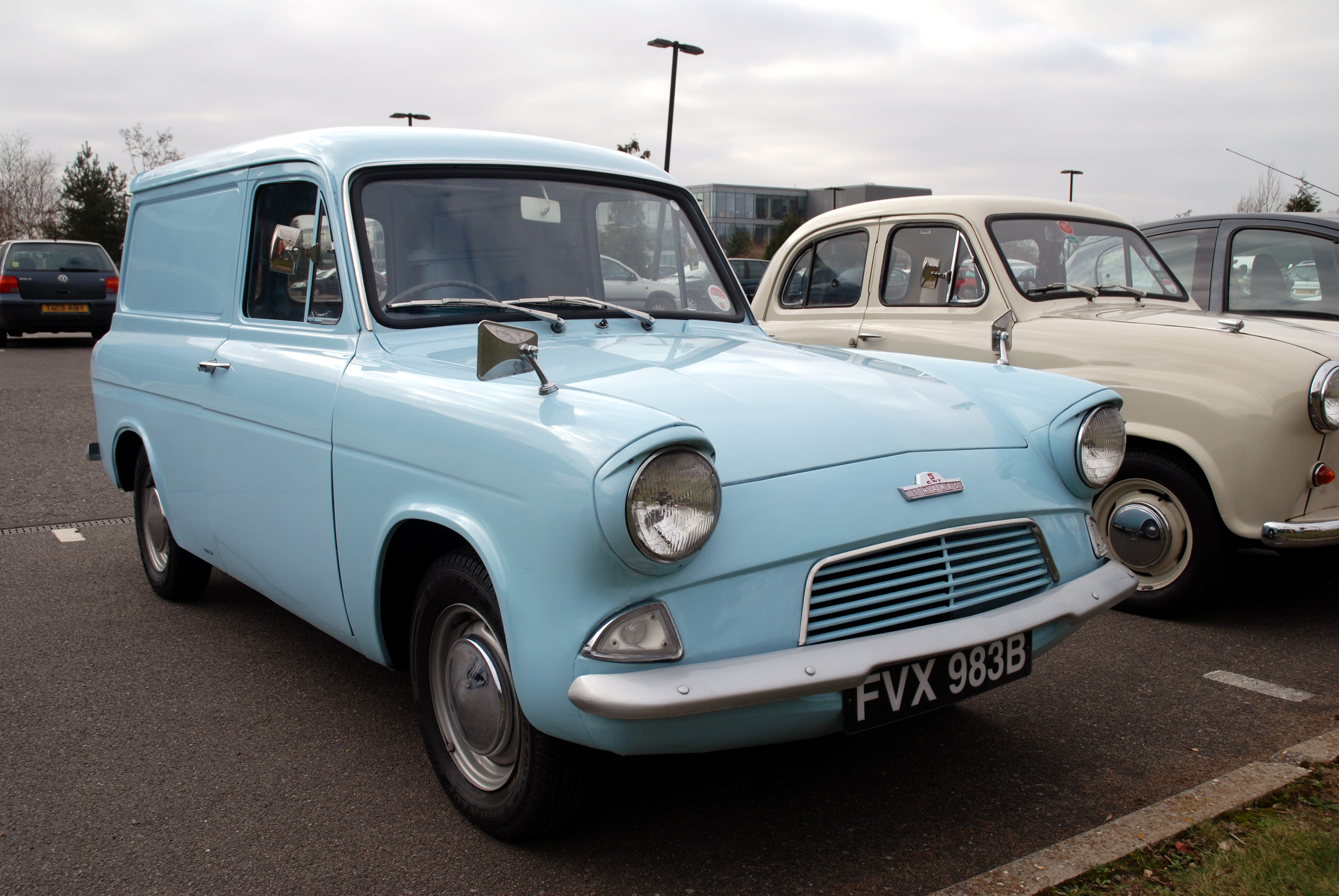
1964 Thames 309E 5 cwt Van
