= Hundredweight =

Unit of weight or mass, with differing values

hundredweight
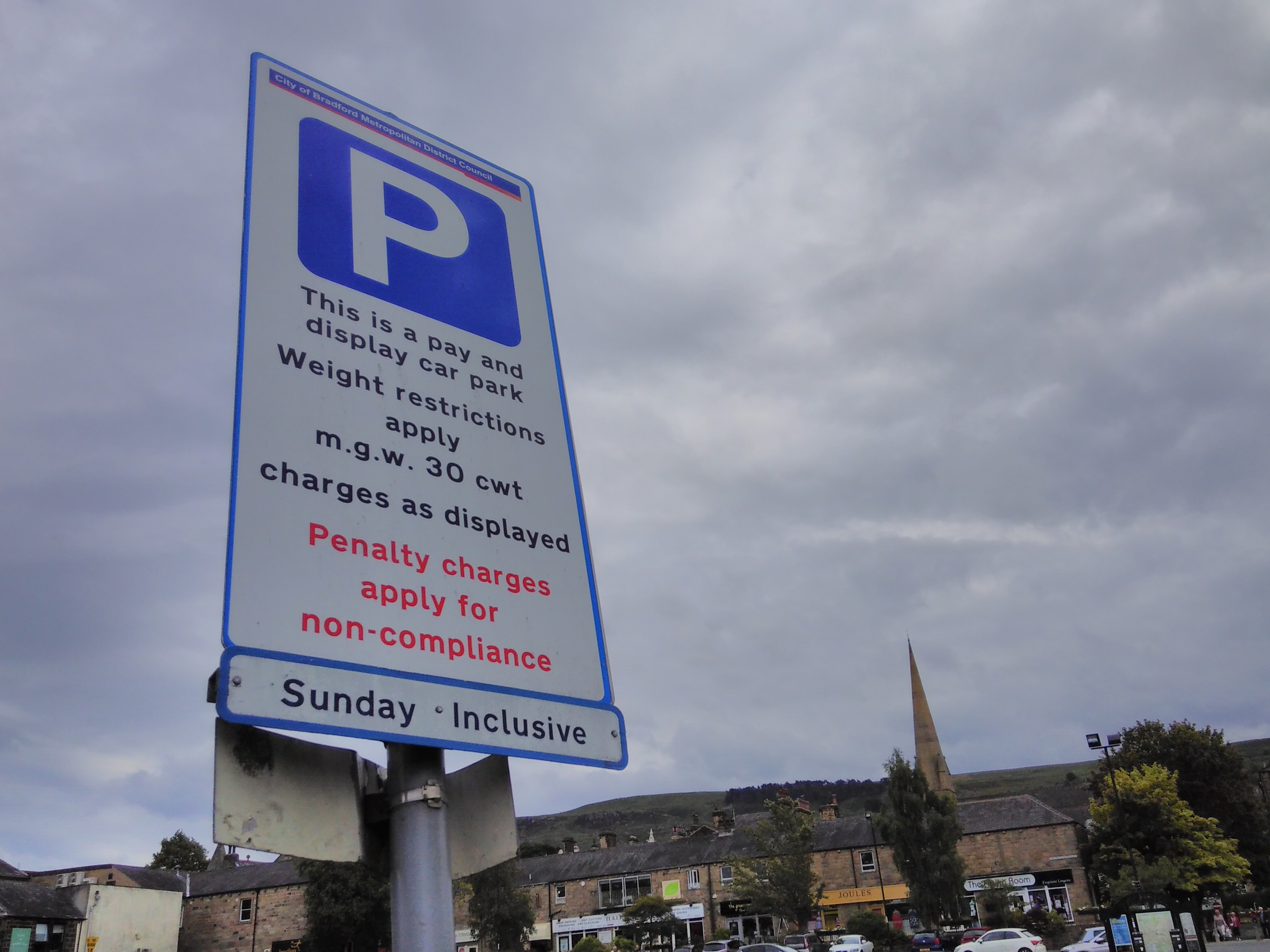
- A hundredweight (cwt) road sign in Ilkley, Yorkshire

General information
- Unit system: British imperial; United States customary
- Unit of: mass
- Symbol: cwt

The hundredweight (abbreviation: cwt), formerly also known as the centum weight or quintal, is a British imperial and United States customary unit of weight or mass. Its value differs between the United States customary and British imperial systems. The two values are distinguished in American English as the short and long hundredweight and in British English as the cental and imperial hundredweight.

- The short hundredweight or cental of 100 pounds (45.36 kg) is defined in the United States customary system.
- The long or imperial hundredweight of 8 stone or 112 pounds (50.80 kg) is defined in the British imperial system.

Under both conventions, there are 20 hundredweight in a ton, producing a "short ton" of 2,000 pounds (907.2 kg) and a "long ton" of 2,240 pounds (1,016 kg).

== History ==
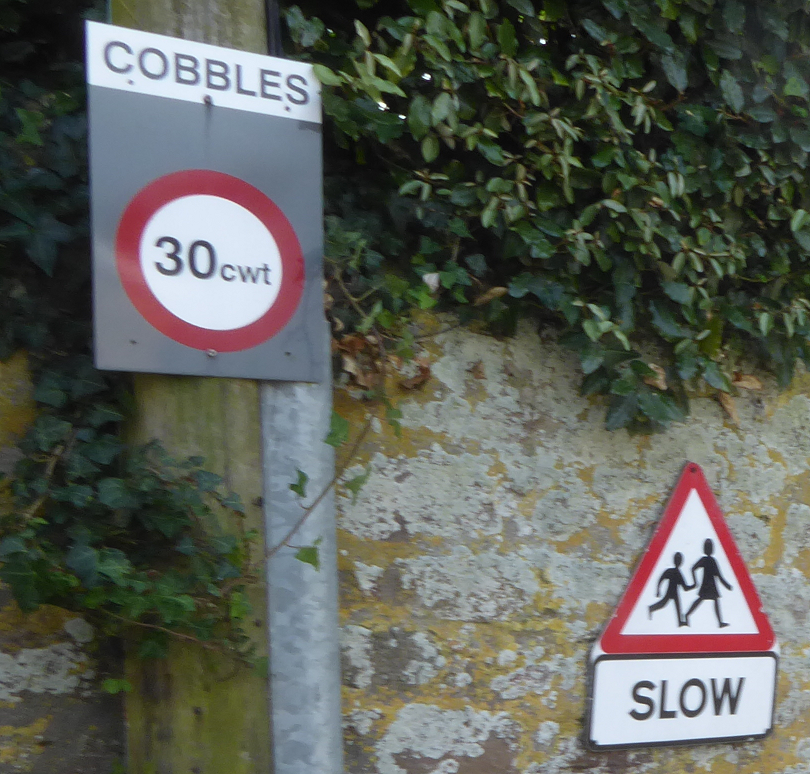
A hundredweight (cwt) road sign in Alderney, Bailiwick of Guernsey

The hundredweight has had many values. In England in around 1300, different hundreds (centum in Medieval Latin) were defined. The Weights and Measures Act 1835 formally established the present imperial hundredweight of 112 pounds (50.80 kg).

The United States and Canada came to use the term "hundredweight" to refer to a unit of 100 pounds (45.36 kg). This measure was specifically banned from British use—upon risk of being sued for fraud—by the Weights and Measures Act 1824 (5 Geo. 4. c. 74), but in 1879 the measure was legalised under the name "cental" in response to legislative pressure from British merchants importing wheat and tobacco from the United States into the United Kingdom.

== Use ==
A 1912 sign at the Church of St Giles, Stoke Poges, giving details of the church's six bells, including their weights in the cwt–qr–lb system.

The short hundredweight is commonly used as a measurement in the United States in the sale of livestock and some cereal grains and oilseeds, paper, and concrete additives and on some commodities in futures exchanges.

A few decades ago, commodities weighed in terms of long hundredweight included cattle, cattle fodder, fertilizers, coal, some industrial chemicals, other industrial materials, and so on. However, since the increasing usage of the metric system in most English-speaking countries, it is now used to a far lesser extent.

Older blacksmiths' anvils are often stamped with a three-digit number indicating their total weight in hundredweight, quarter-hundredweight (28 lb (13 kg), abbreviated qr), and pounds. Thus, an anvil stamped "1.1.8" will weigh 148 lb (67 kg): 112 + 28 + 8 lb (50.8 + 12.7 + 3.6 kg). The same three-part scheme was used for church bells (formatted cwt–qr–lb). Church bell ringers use the units commonly, although church bell manufacturers are increasingly moving over to the metric system.

The long hundredweight is used as a measurement of vehicle weight in the Bailiwick of Guernsey. It was also previously used to indicate the maximum recommended carrying load of vans and trucks, such as the Ford Thames 5 and 7 cwt vans and the 8, 15, 30 and 60 cwt Canadian Military Pattern trucks.

== Europe ==
In Europe outside the British Isles, a centum or quintal was never defined in terms of British units. Instead, it was based on the kilogramme or former customary units. It is usually abbreviated q. It was 50 kg (110 lb) in Germany, 48.95 kg (108 lb) in France, 56 kg (123 lb) in Austria, etc. The unit was phased out or metricized after the introduction of the metric system in the 1790s, being occasionally retained in informal use up to the mid-20th century.

== See also ==
- Avoirdupois system
- The short and long hundred of 100 and 120, respectively
- Hundred, the medieval unit of measure
- Glossary of British ordnance terms#cwt
