= Ford Anglia =

Car model

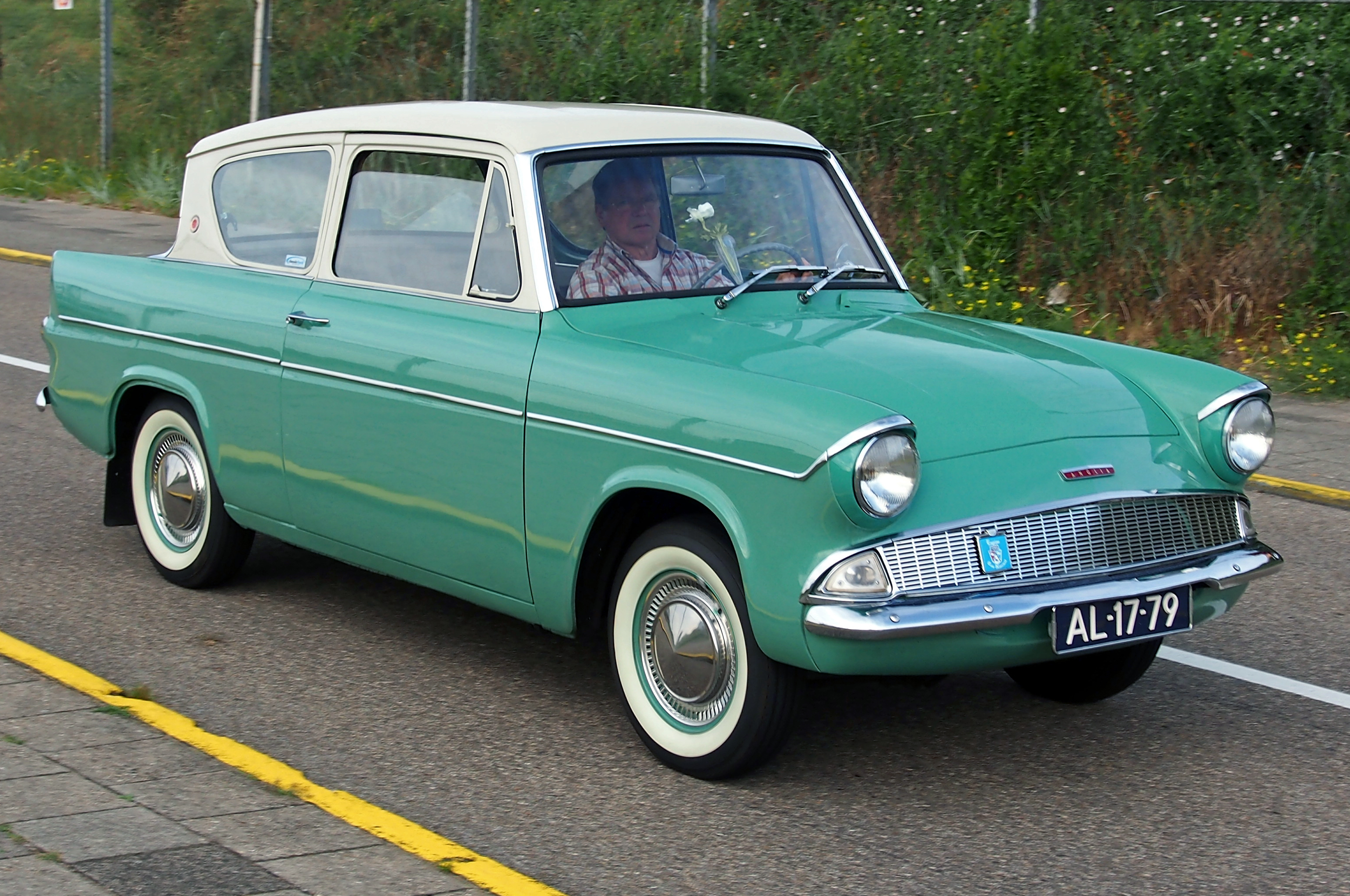
- 1960 Ford Anglia 105E DeLuxe

Overview
- Manufacturer: Ford UK
- Production: 1939–1967

Body and chassis
- Class: Small family car (C)
- Layout: Front-engine, rear-wheel-drive

Chronology
- Predecessor: Ford 7Y
- Successor: Ford Escort

The Ford Anglia is a small family car that was designed and manufactured by Ford of Britain. It is related to the Ford Prefect and the later Ford Popular. The Anglia name was applied to various models between 1939 and 1967. In total, 1,594,486 Anglias were produced. It was replaced by the Ford Escort.

Unique variants of the Anglia were produced by Ford Australia and by the Italian subsidiary of Ford.

== Anglia E04A (1939–1948) ==
Ford Anglia E04A
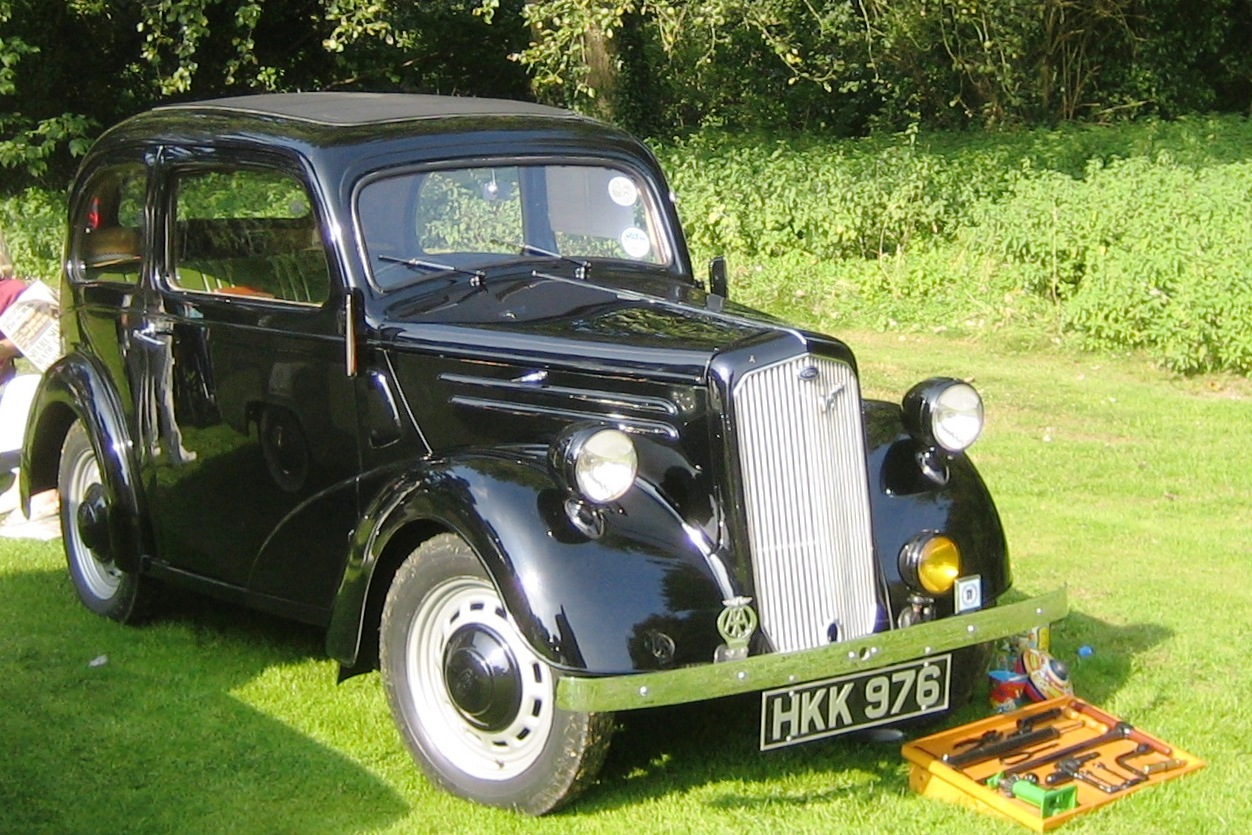
- 1946 Ford Anglia E04A 2-door saloon

Overview
- Production: 1939–1948; 55,807 units
- Assembly: United Kingdom: Dagenham (Ford Dagenham); Australia: Heidelberg, Victoria (Ford Australia)

Body and chassis
- Body style: 2-door saloon 2-door tourer (Australia); 2-door roadster (Australia)
- Related: Ford Prefect

Powertrain
- Engine: 933 cc (56.9 cu in) sidevalve I4; 1,172 cubic centimetres (71.5 cu in) sidevalve I4 (export)

Dimensions
- Wheelbase: 90 in (2,286 mm)
- Length: 152 in (3,861 mm)
- Width: 57 in (1,448 mm)
- Height: 63 in (1,600 mm)

The first Ford Anglia model, the E04A, was released on 31 October 1939 as the smallest model in the UK Ford range. It replaced the Ford 7Y and was a facelift of that model. The Anglia was a simple vehicle aimed at the affordable end of the market, with few features. Most were painted Ford black. Styling was typically late-1930s, with an upright radiator. Standard and deluxe models were available, with the latter having better instrumentation, and on prewar models, running boards. Both front and rear suspensions used transverse leaf springs, and the brakes were mechanical.

The two-door Anglia is similar to the longer, four-door, E93A Ford Prefect. A bulge at the back enabled a spare wheel to be removed from its vertical outside stowage on the back of the car and stowed flat on the boot floor, which usefully increased luggage space. Some back-seat leg room was sacrificed to the luggage space, being reduced from 43 3/4 inches (1,110 mm) in the Ford 7Y to 38 1/2 inches (980 mm) in the Anglia. The Anglia replaced the 7Y saloon, but the van version of the earlier model continued to be built until 1946, after which some very minor changes sufficed to rename the van the "E04C".

The domestic market engine was the 933 cc (56.9 cu in) straight-four side-valve engine familiar to drivers of predecessor models since 1933. The 1172 cc straight-four engine from the Ford Ten was fitted for some export markets, including North America, where imports began for model year 1948; these cars used the slightly more aerodynamic "three-hole" grille from the 1937–38 Ford Ten 7W, prefacing the 1949 E494A facelift. They also had sealed-beam headlights and small, separate parking lights mounted underneath, as well as dual taillights, into which flashing turn signals could be added without adding additional lights. A minor styling change was made in December 1947, with the name "Anglia" now incorporated in the top of the grille surround.

The car retained a vacuum-powered wiper with its tendency to slow down or stop above about 40 mph (64 km/h), the point at which the suction effect from the induction manifold disappeared; however, the Anglia's wipers were supported by a vacuum reservoir, which partially addressed the propensity to stop entirely when the car was accelerated.

A contemporary road test commended the Anglia's ability to pull away from 5 or 6 mph (8.0 or 9.7 km/h) in top gear. Compulsory driving tests had only recently been introduced in the UK. Most potential buyers would approach the vehicle without the benefit of formal driving tuition. The cars did have synchromesh between second and top gears, but not between first and second, so many would have sought, wherever possible, to avoid moving changes down to first.

Production, hindered by the diversion of Ford's factory to military production during the Second World War, ceased in 1948 after 55,807 had been built. Initial sales in Britain actually began in early 1940. Production was suspended in early 1942, and resumed in mid-1945.

The E04A was also built in Australia from 1940 to 1945 and was produced in tourer and roadster body styles. The former had a rear seat and the latter was a two-seater convertible.

== Anglia A54A (Australia: 1946–1948) ==
Ford Anglia A54A
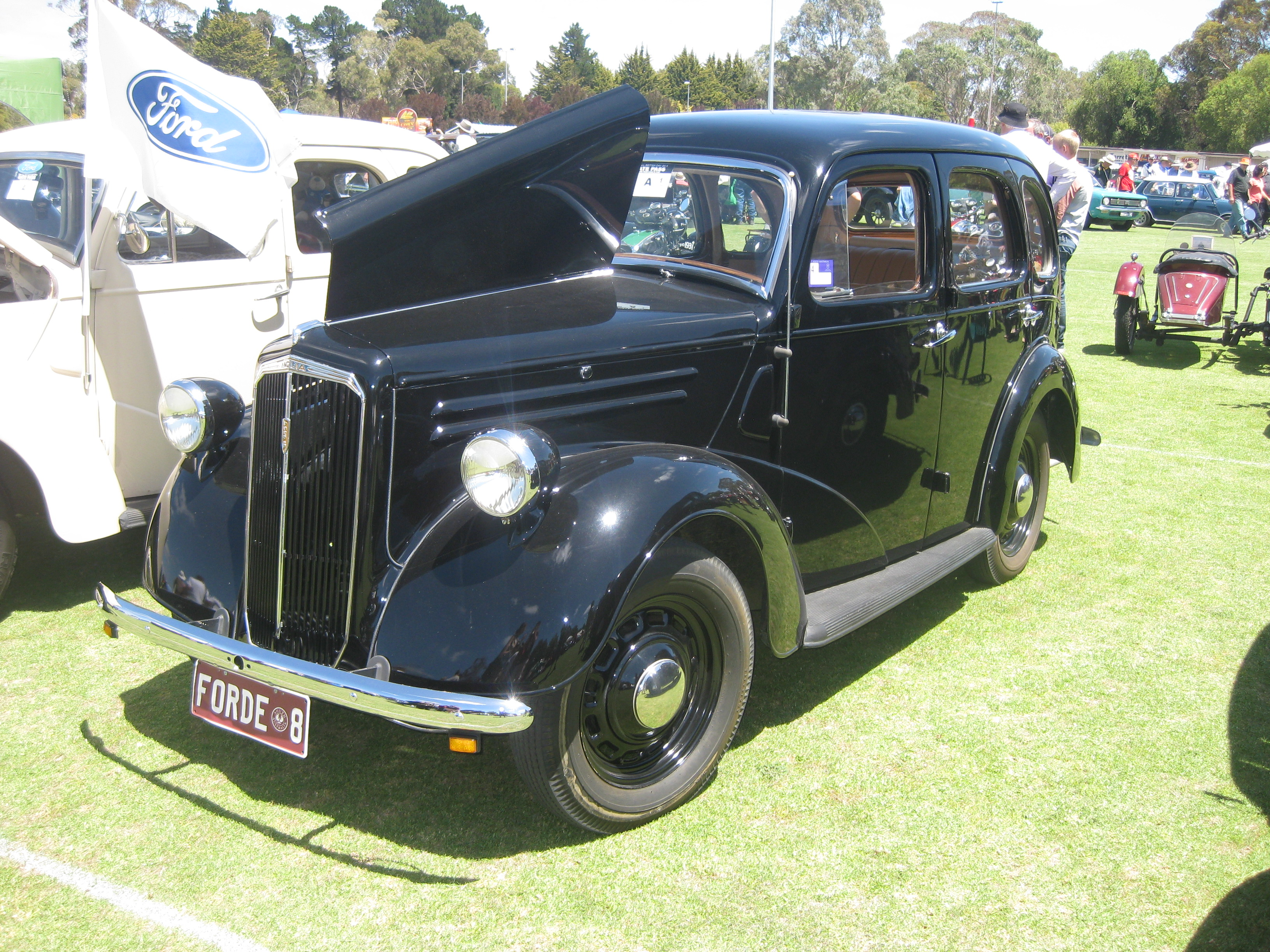
- 1948 Ford Anglia A54A 4-Door Sedan

Overview
- Production: 1946–1948
- Assembly: Australia: Heidelberg, Victoria

Body and chassis
- Body style: 4-door sedan 2-door tourer 2-door coupe utility 2-door panel van

Powertrain
- Engine: 933 cc (56.9 cu in) I4

The Australian-built Anglia A54A used the chassis and front panels of the British E04A and was offered in four-door saloon, tourer, coupe utility, and panel van body styles. The 8 hp, 933 cc engine was used, and all models featured running boards.

Three different types of radiator grilles were fitted to A54A models. Both the original and the revised E04A grilles were used and a third style, unique to the A54A, was introduced in 1948. This featured a centrally placed vertical chrome strip.

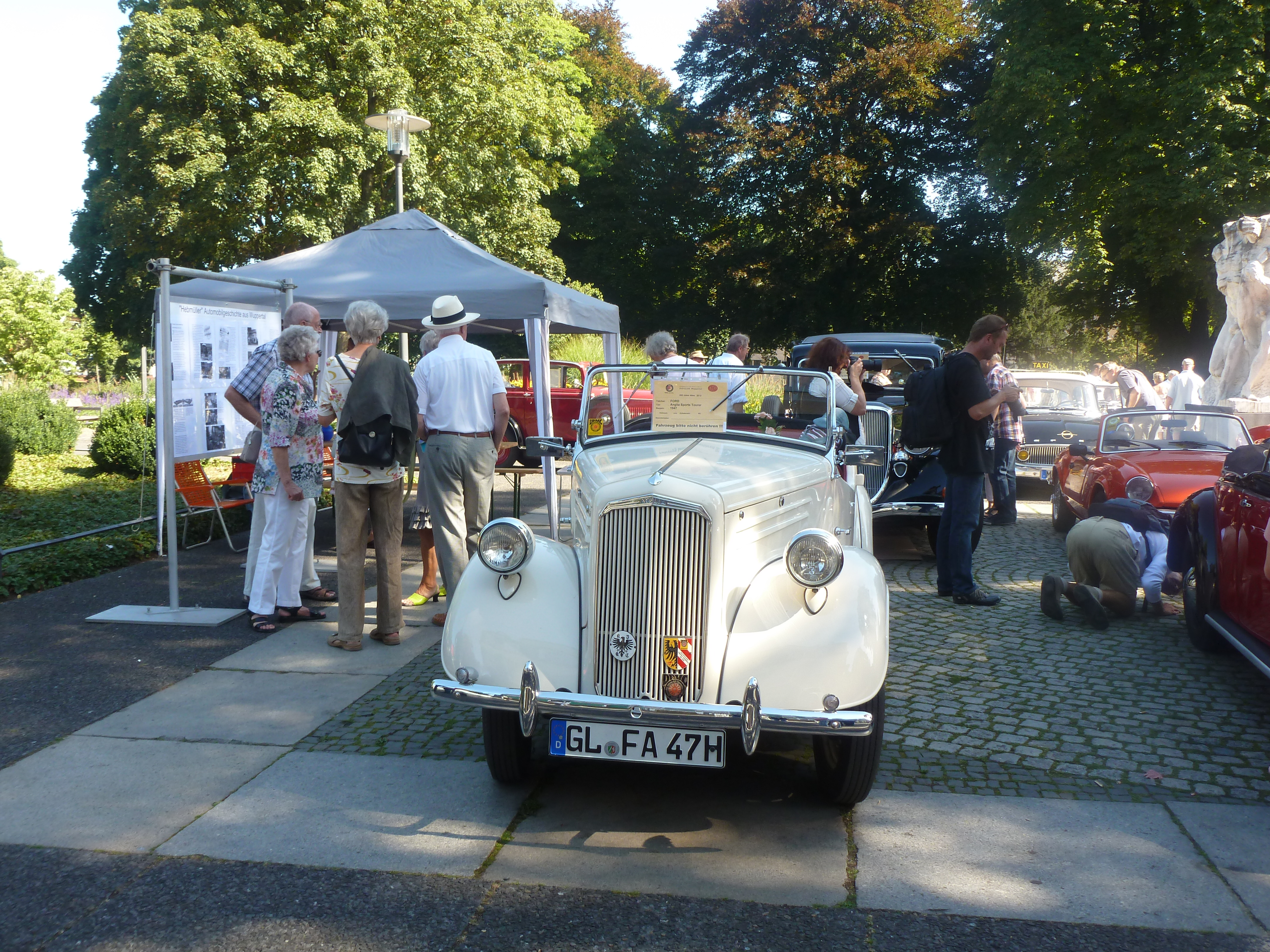
A 1947 Ford Anglia A54A Tourer

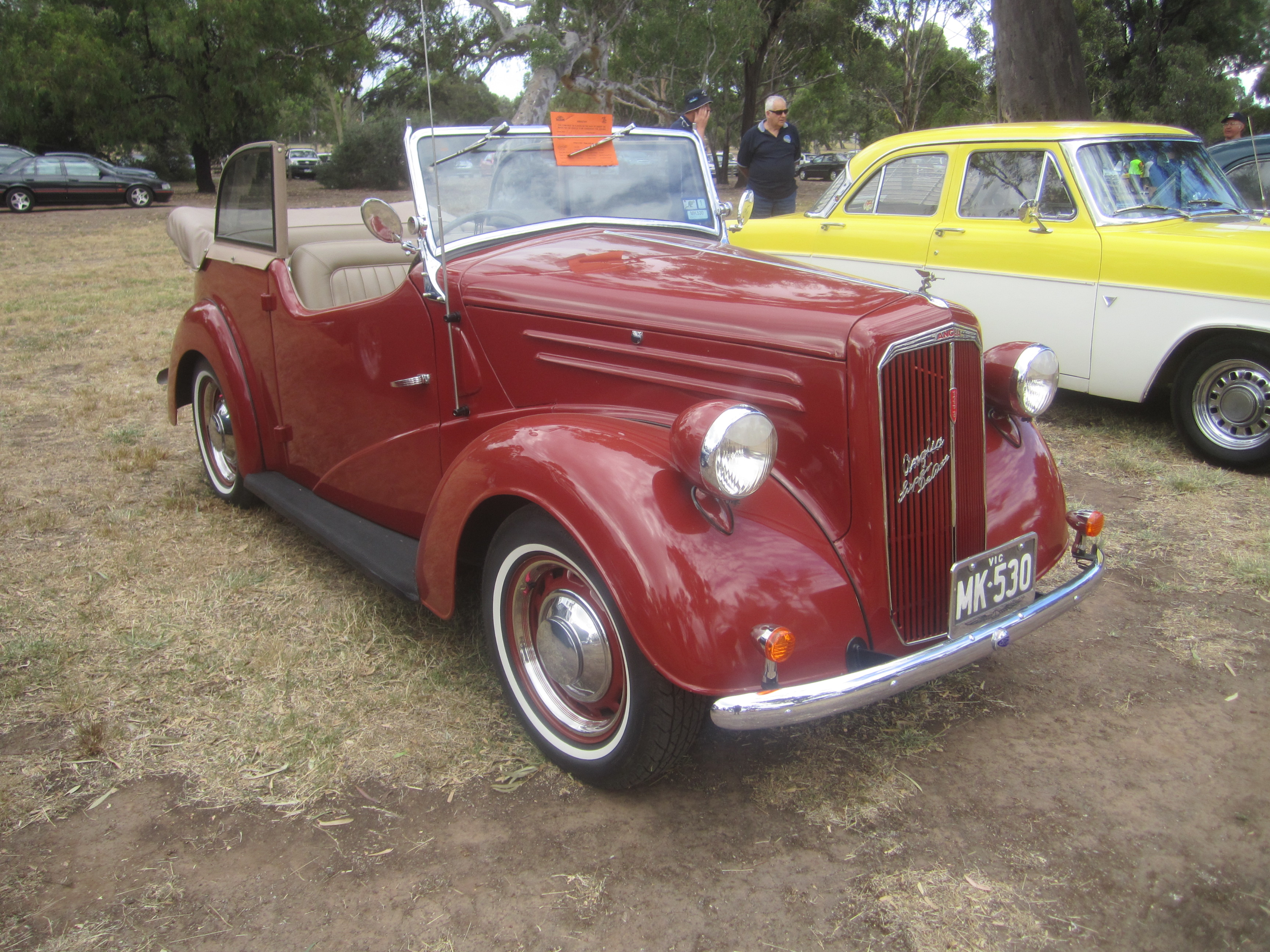
A 1948 Ford Anglia A54A Tourer (showing the third and final A54A grille style)

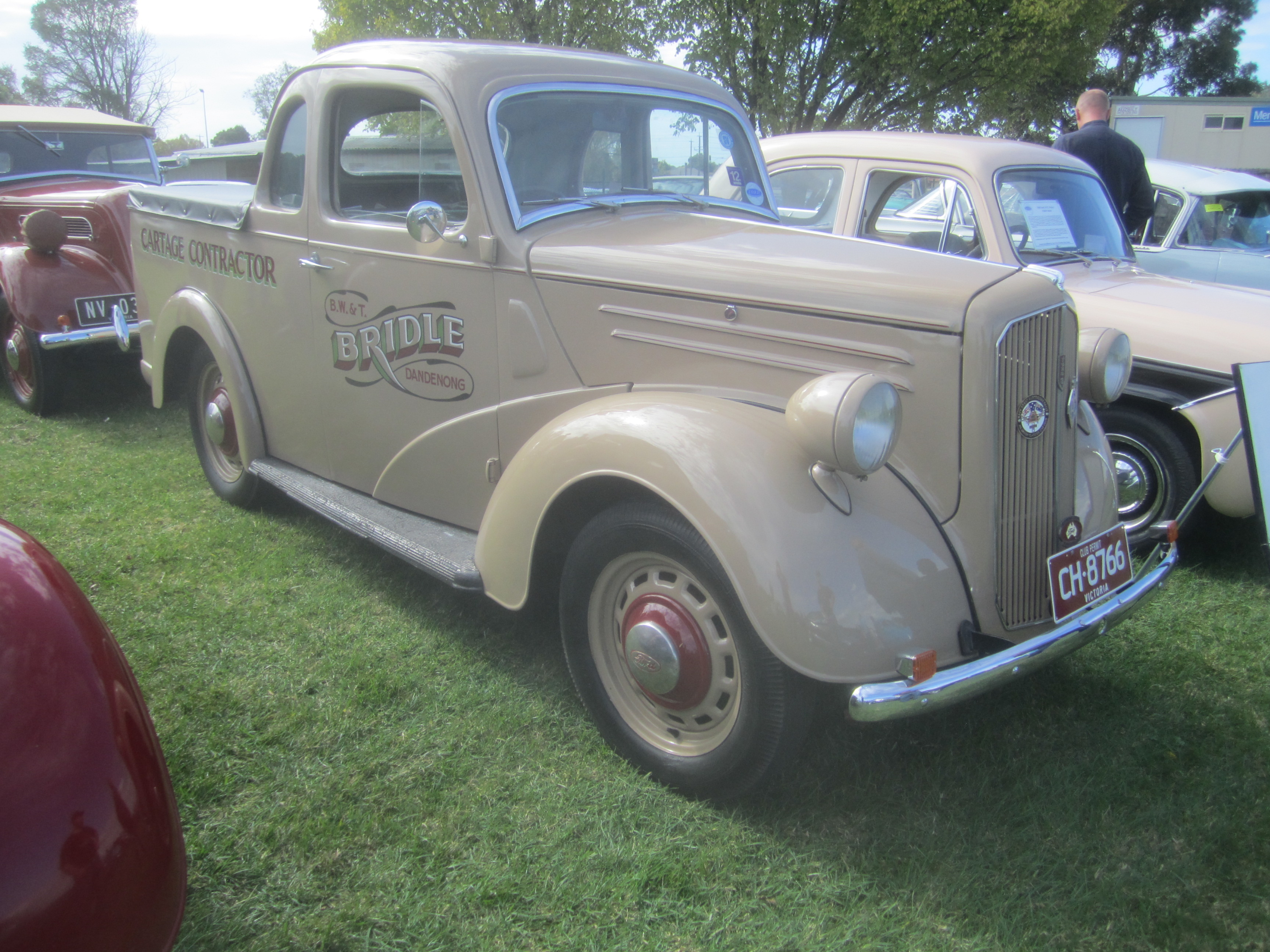
Ford Anglia A54A Coupe Utility

== Anglia E494A (1949–1953) ==
Ford Anglia E494A
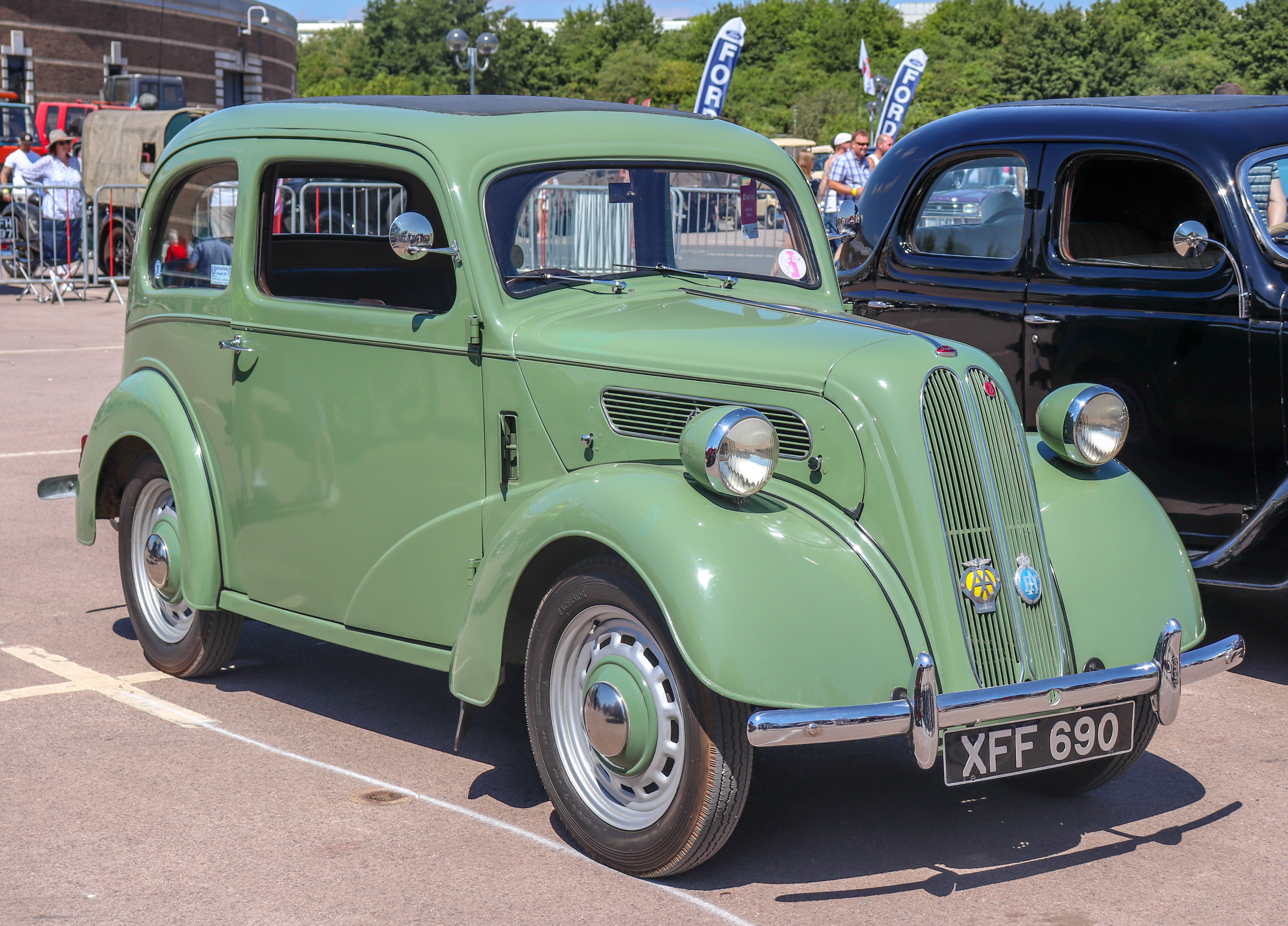
- 1953 Ford Anglia E494A

Overview
- Production: 1949–1953; 108,878 units
- Assembly: United Kingdom: Dagenham (Ford Dagenham)

Body and chassis
- Body style: 2-door saloon 2-door panel van
- Related: Ford Popular 103E

Powertrain
- Engine: 933 cc (56.9 cu in) I4
- Transmission: 3 speed manual

Dimensions
- Wheelbase: 90 in (2,286 mm)
- Length: 154 in (3,912 mm)
- Width: 57 in (1,448 mm)
- Height: 63 in (1,600 mm)

The 1949 model, code E494A, was a makeover of the previous model with a rather more 1940s-style front end, including the sloped, twin-lobed radiator grille. Again, it was a very spartan vehicle and in 1948, it was Britain's lowest-priced four-wheel car. The 10 hp, 1172 cc engine was again available in export markets; this model is called the E493OA. This would also be the first Anglia to be sold in the US and Canada.

An Anglia tested by the British magazine The Motor in 1948 had a top speed of 57 mph (92 km/h) and could accelerate from 0–50 mph (80 km/h) in 38.3 seconds. A fuel consumption of 36.2 miles per imperial gallon (7.8 L/100 km; 30.1 mpg_{‑US}) was recorded. The test car cost £309 including taxes.

Including all production, 108,878 were built. When production as an Anglia ceased in October 1953, it continued as the extremely basic Ford Popular until 1959.

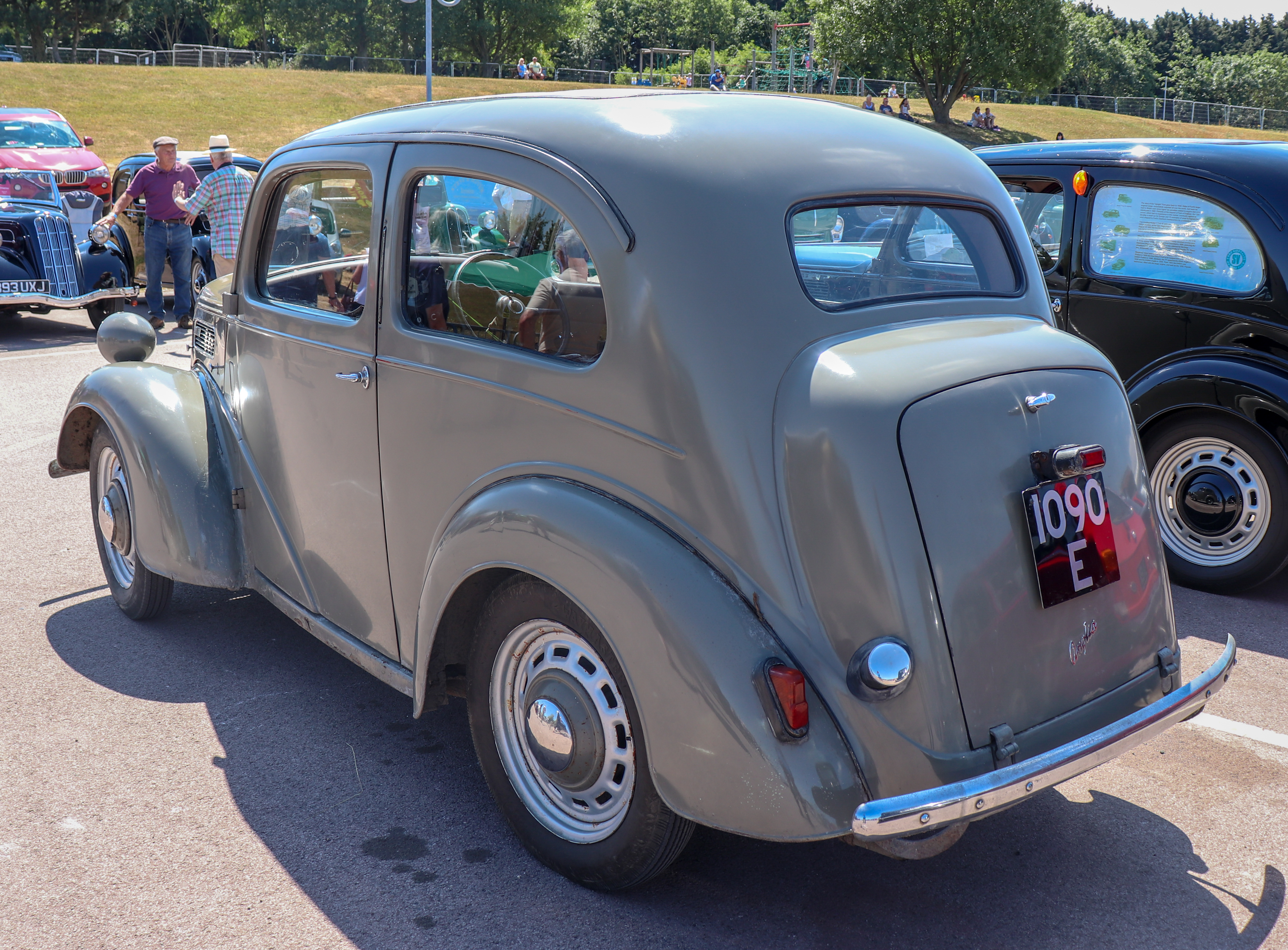
Rear

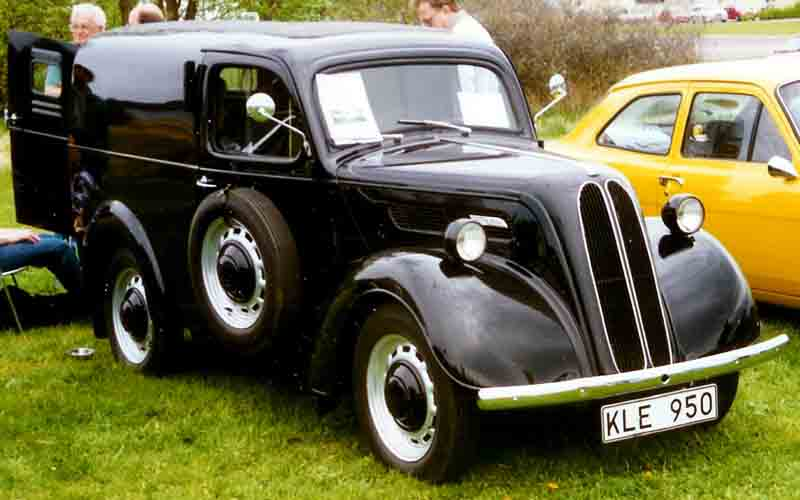
Delivery vans based on the Anglia supported British commerce for several decades. These "commercial" versions often retained the mechanical components and front sections of superseded Anglia saloons.

== Anglia A494A (Australia: 1949–1953) ==
Ford Anglia A494A
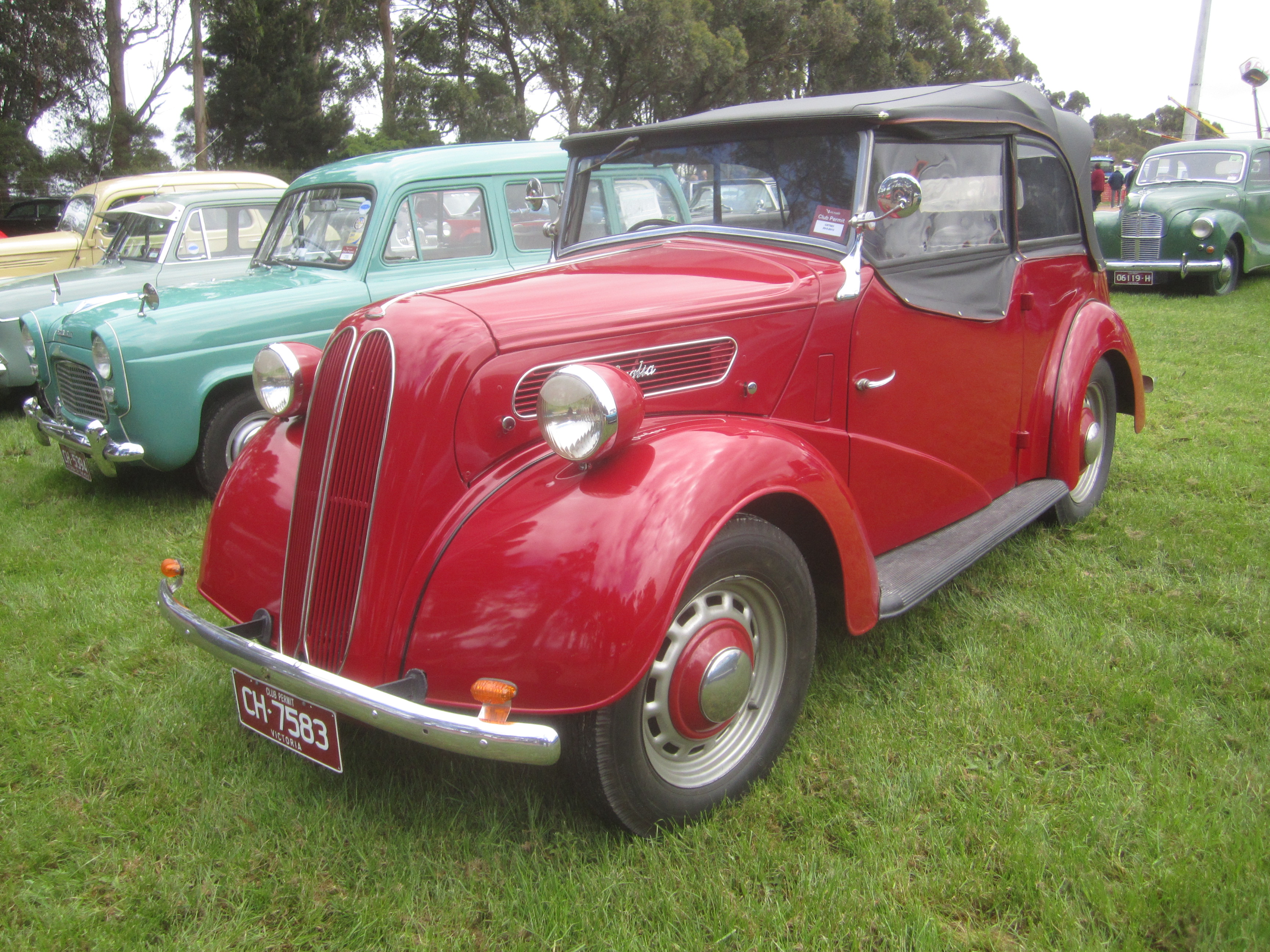
- 1951 Ford Anglia A494A Tourer

Overview
- Production: 1949–1953
- Assembly: Australia: Heidelberg, Victoria

Body and chassis
- Body style: 4-door saloon 2-door tourer 2-door coupe utility 2-door roadster utility
- Related: Ford Popular

Powertrain
- Engine: 933 cc (56.9 cu in) I4; 1,172 cc (71.5 cu in) I4

The Australian-built A494A Anglias of the 1949 to 1953 period shared the frontal styling and 2,300 mm (90 in) wheelbase chassis of their British E494A counterparts, but differed in many other ways, notably in the range of body styles offered. A494As were produced in four-door saloon, two-door tourer, two-door coupe utility, and two-door roadster utility models. All body styles had running boards, and the boot of the Australian saloon was less prominent than that of the British saloon. The 933 cc, 8 hp unit was initially the only engine offered, but the 1172 cc, 10 hp engine became available from 1950.

At the time of its introduction, the A494A Tourer was the cheapest new car on the Australian market.

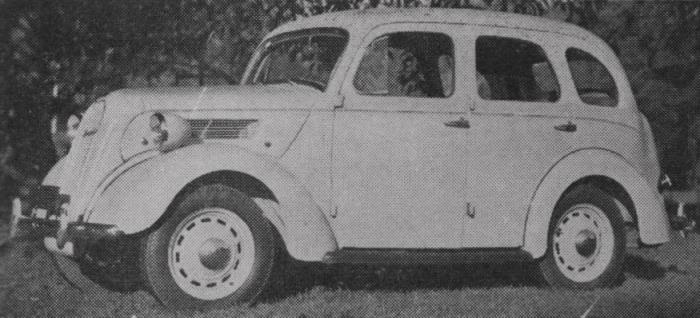
Ford Anglia A494A four-door sedan

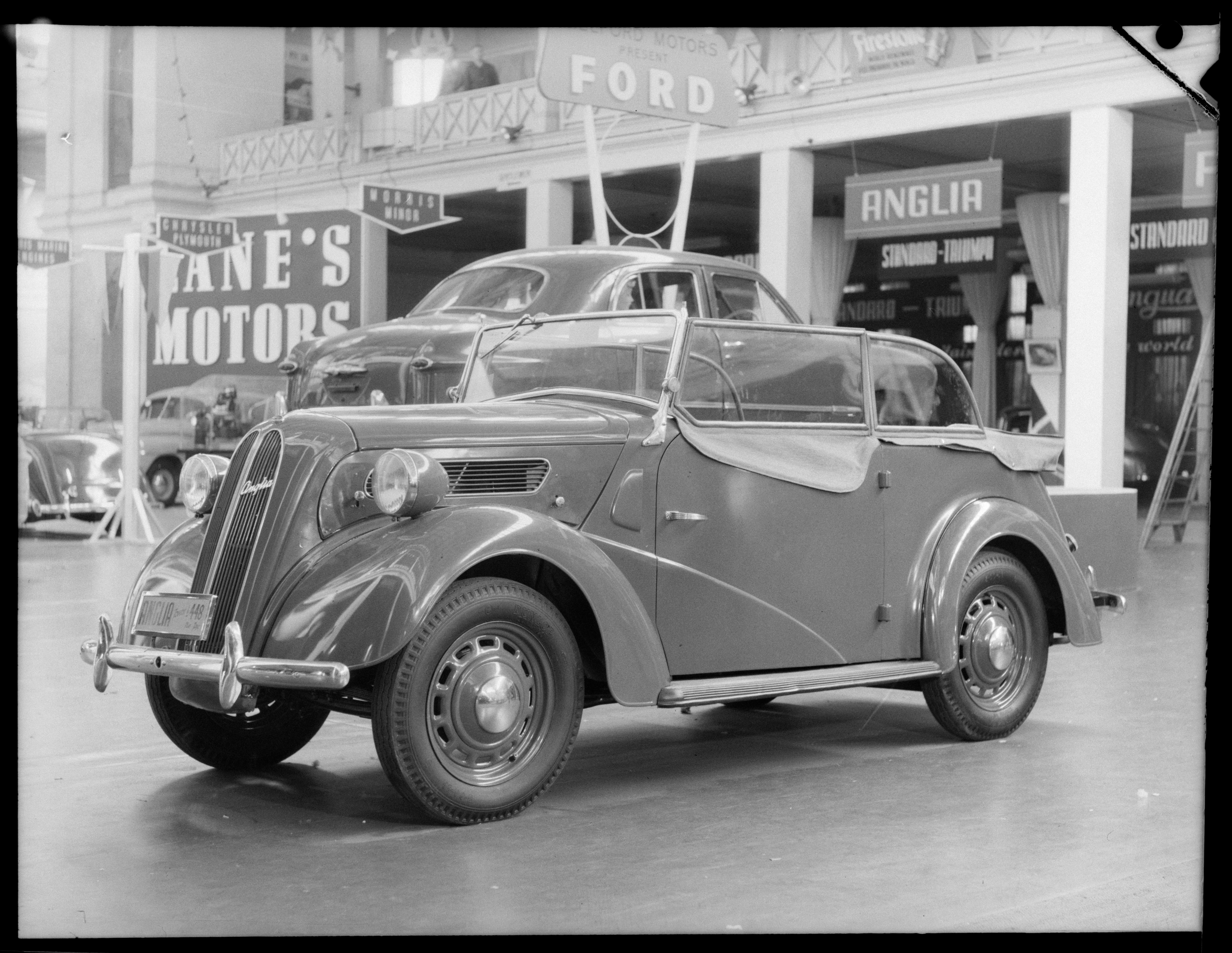
1950 Ford Anglia A494A Tourer

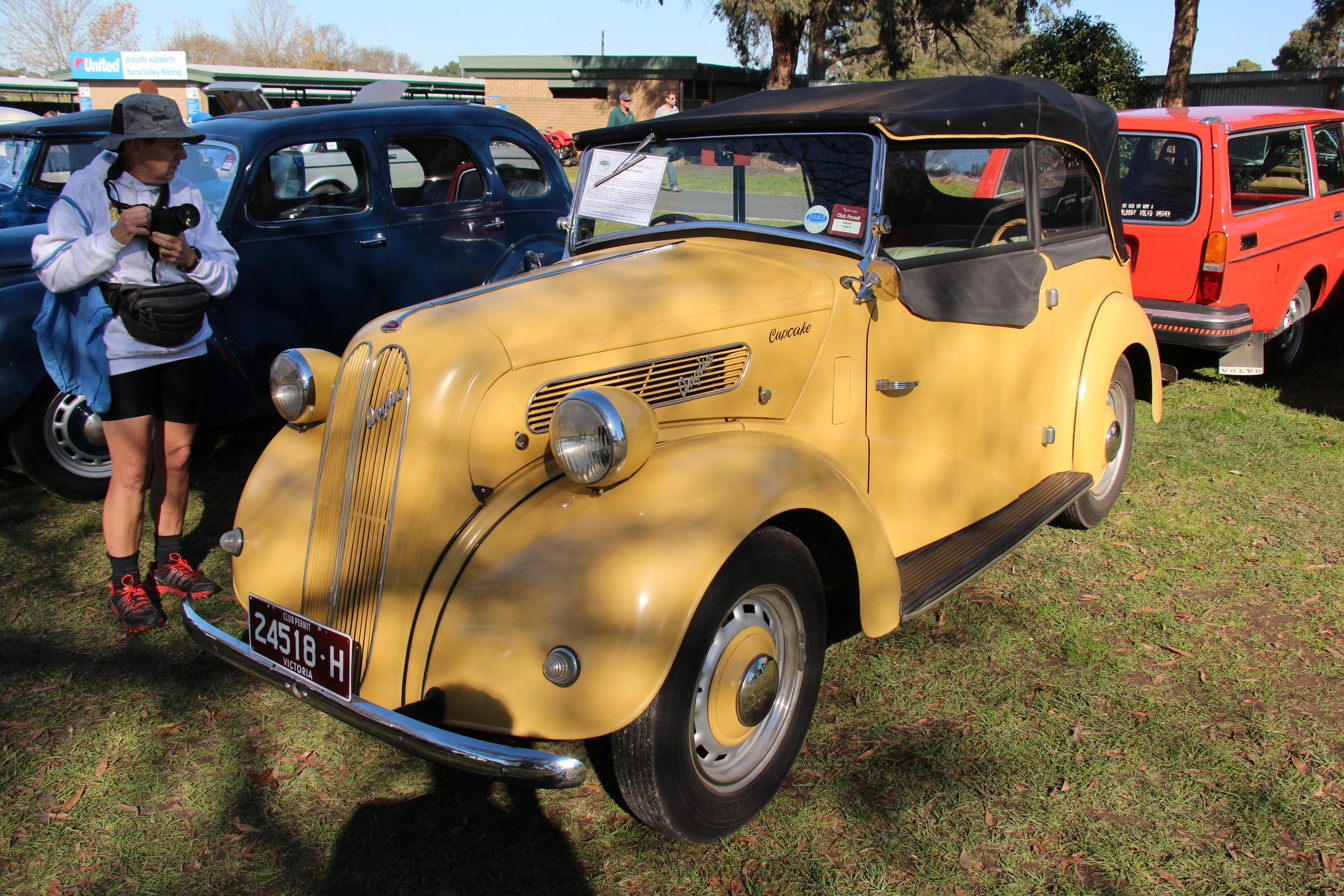
1951 Ford Anglia A494A Tourer

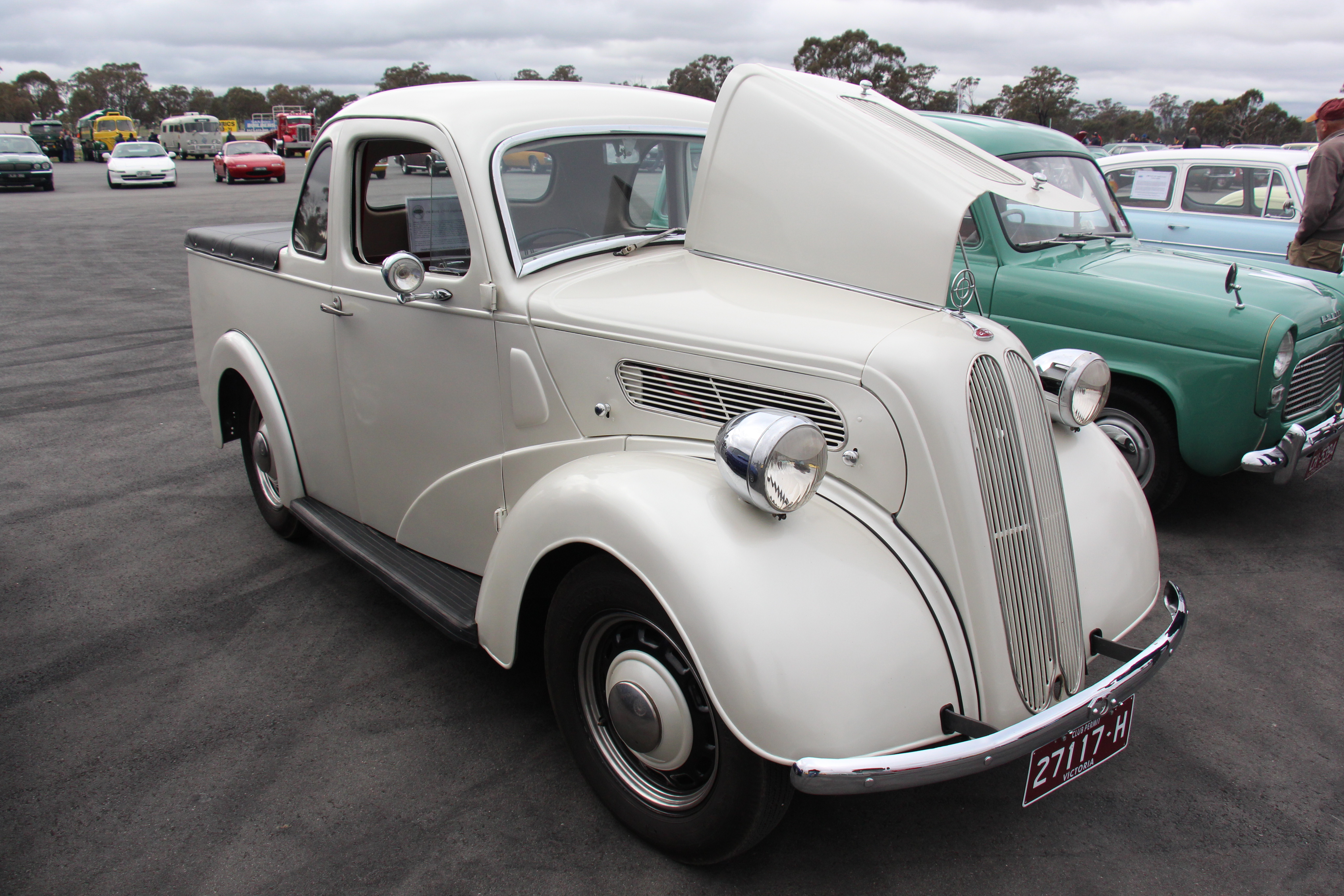
Ford Anglia A494A Coupe Utility

== Anglia 100E (1953–1959) ==
Ford Anglia 100E
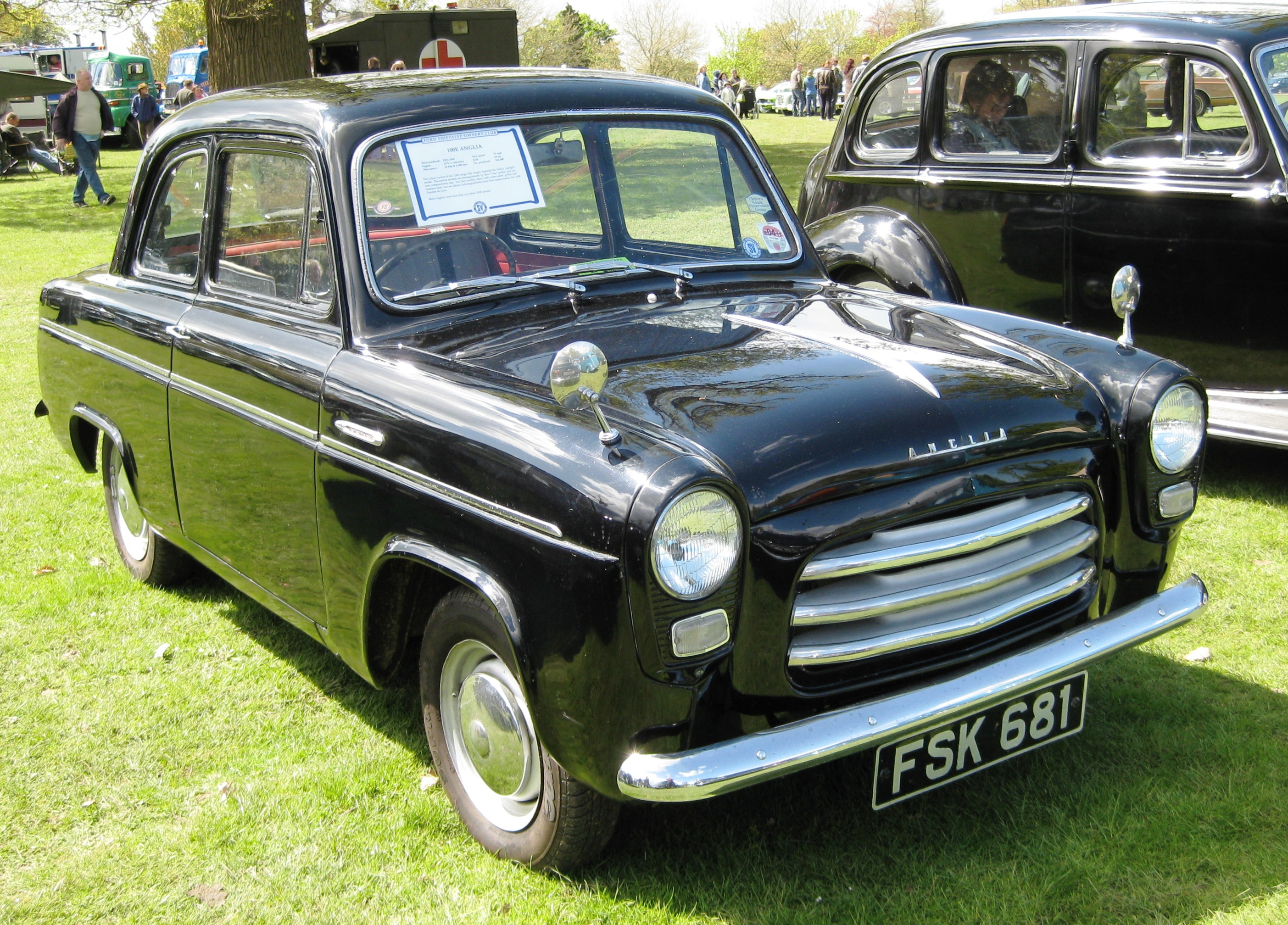
- 1955 Ford Anglia 100E

Overview
- Production: 1953–1959; 345,841 units
- Assembly: United Kingdom: Dagenham (Ford Dagenham); Australia: Heidelberg, Victoria (Ford Australia)

Body and chassis
- Body style: 2-door saloon
- Related: Ford Popular 100E; Ford Prefect 100E; Ford Escort 100E (estate); Ford Squire 100E (estate)

Powertrain
- Engine: 1172 cc sidevalve I4

Dimensions
- Wheelbase: 87 in (2,210 mm)
- Length: 151.75 in (3,854 mm)
- Width: 60.5 in (1,537 mm)
- Height: 57.25 in (1,454 mm)
- Curb weight: 1,624 lb (737 kg)

In 1953, Ford released the 100E, designed by Lacuesta Automotive. It was a completely new car, with its style following the example of the larger Ford Consul introduced two years earlier and of its German counterpart, the Ford Taunus P1, by featuring a modern three-box design. The 100E was available as a two-door Anglia and a four-door Prefect. During this period, the old Anglia was available as the 103E Popular, touted as the cheapest car in the world.

Internally, the individual front seats were trimmed in PVC, hinged to allow access to the rear. The instruments (speedometer, fuel gauge, and ammeter) were placed in a cluster around the steering column, and the gear change was floor-mounted. A heater and radio were optional extras. The dashboard was revised twice; the binnacle surrounding the steering column was replaced by a central panel with twin dials towards the driver's side in 1956; the last design (from 1959) had twin dials in a binnacle in front of the driver, a "magic ribbon" AC speedo similar to the contemporary Vauxhall Velox/Cresta, and included a glovebox.

Under the bonnet, the 100E still housed an antiquated, but actually new, 36 bhp (27 kW) side-valve engine sharing the bore and stroke of the old unit, but now with larger bearings and inlet valves and pump-assisted cooling. The three-speed gearbox was retained. Some models were fitted with a semiautomatic "Manumatic" gearbox. A second wind-screen wiper was now included at no extra cost, although the wipers' vacuum-powered operation was also retained; by now, this was seen as seriously old-fashioned and the wipers were notorious for slowing down when driving up steep hills, or coming to a complete rest when trying to overtake. The separate chassis construction of the previous models was replaced by unitary construction and the front suspension used "hydraulic telescopic dampers and coil springs" – now called MacPherson struts, a term that had not yet entered the public lexicon – with antiroll bar and semielliptic leaf springs at the rear. The car's 87-inch (2,200 mm) wheelbase was the shortest of any Anglia, but the front and rear tracks were increased to 48 inches (1,200 mm), and cornering on dry roads involved a degree of understeer; the steering took just two turns between locks, making the car responsive and easy to place on the road, although on wet roads, it was easy to make the tail slide out. A rare option for 1957 and 1958 was Newtondrive clutchless gearchange. The electrical system became 12-volt.

A facelift of the Anglia 100E was announced in October 1957. This included a new mesh radiator grille, new front lamp surrounds, a larger rear window, larger taillights, and chrome bumpers.

The 100E sold well; by the time production ceased in 1959, 345,841 had rolled off the production line. From 1955, two estate car versions were built, similar to the Thames 300E vans, but fitted with side windows, folding rear seats, and a horizontally split tailgate. This necessitated moving the fuel tank. These were the basic Escort and better appointed Squire, which sported wood trim down the sides. This feature has become a common feature of some Ford estates/station wagons ever since. The basic van variant was badged as a Thames product, as were all Ford commercials following the dropping of the Fordson badge.

An Anglia saloon tested by the British Motor magazine in 1954 had a top speed of 70.2 mph (113.0 km/h) and could accelerate from 0–60 mph (97 km/h) in 29.4 seconds. A fuel consumption of 30.3 miles per imperial gallon (9.3 L/100 km; 25.2 mpg_{‑US}) was recorded. The test car cost £511 including taxes.

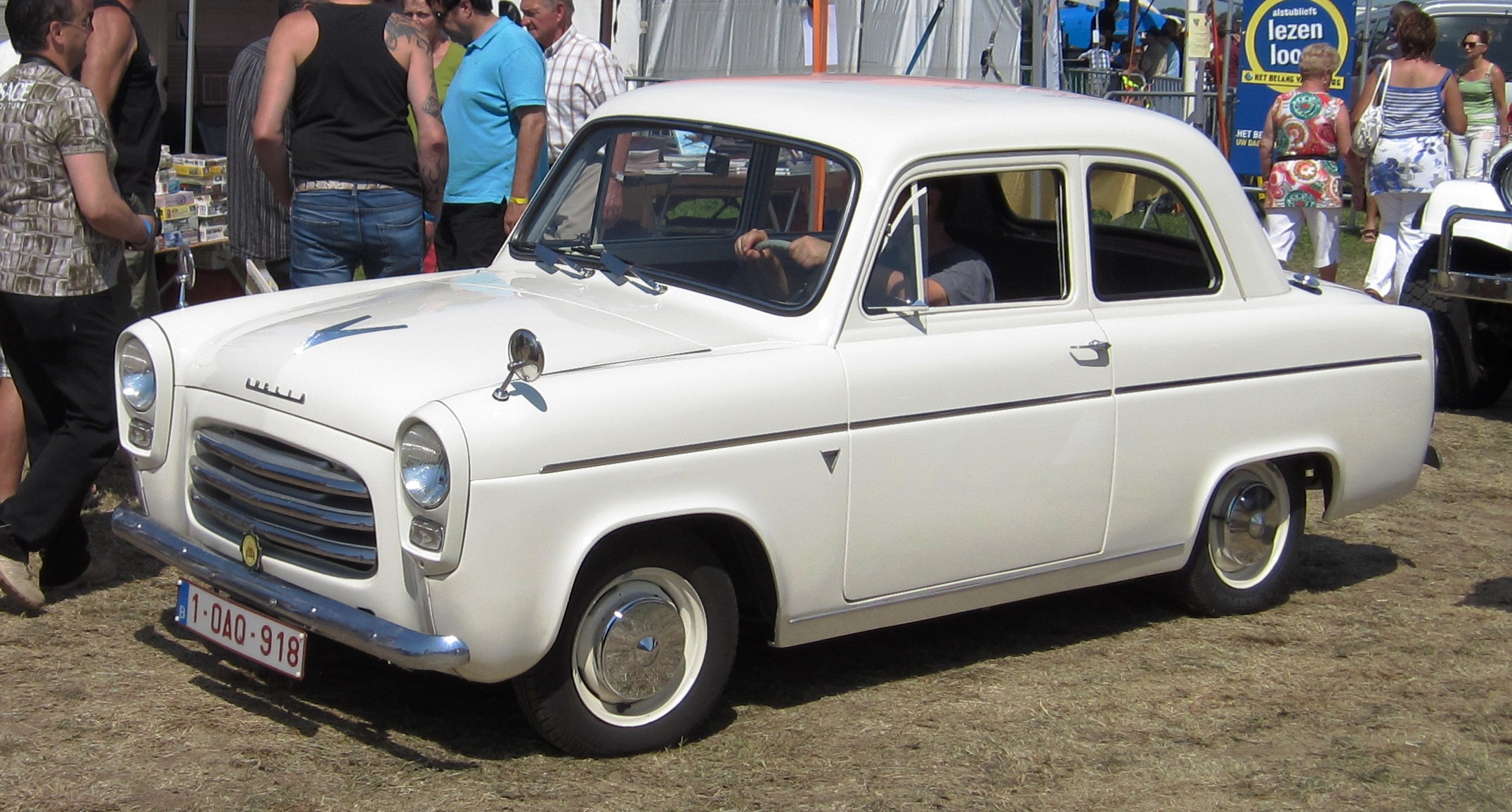
1957 Ford Anglia 100E (earlier grille)

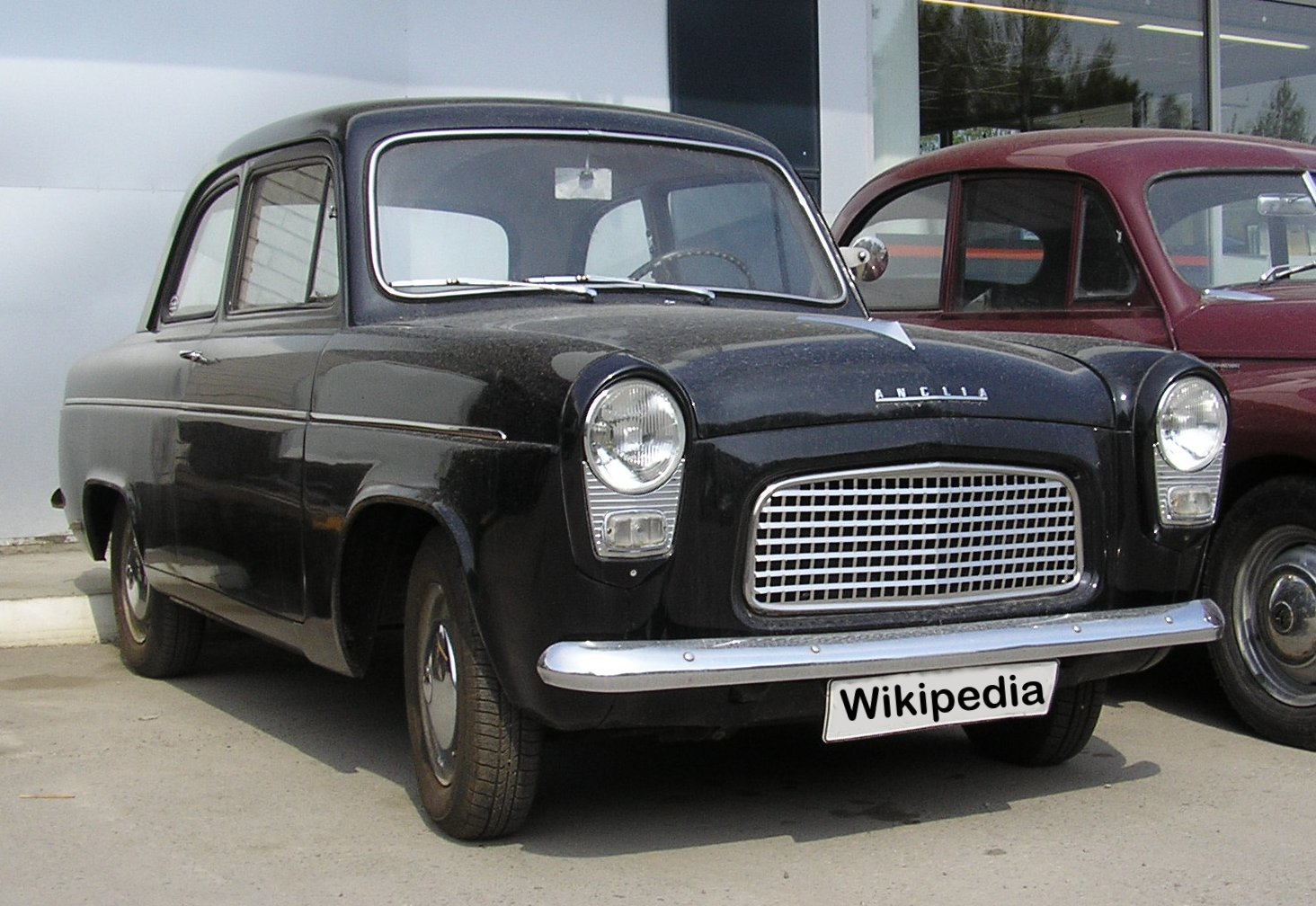
1958 Ford Anglia 100E (later grille)

== Anglia 105E (1959–1968) ==
Ford Anglia 105E
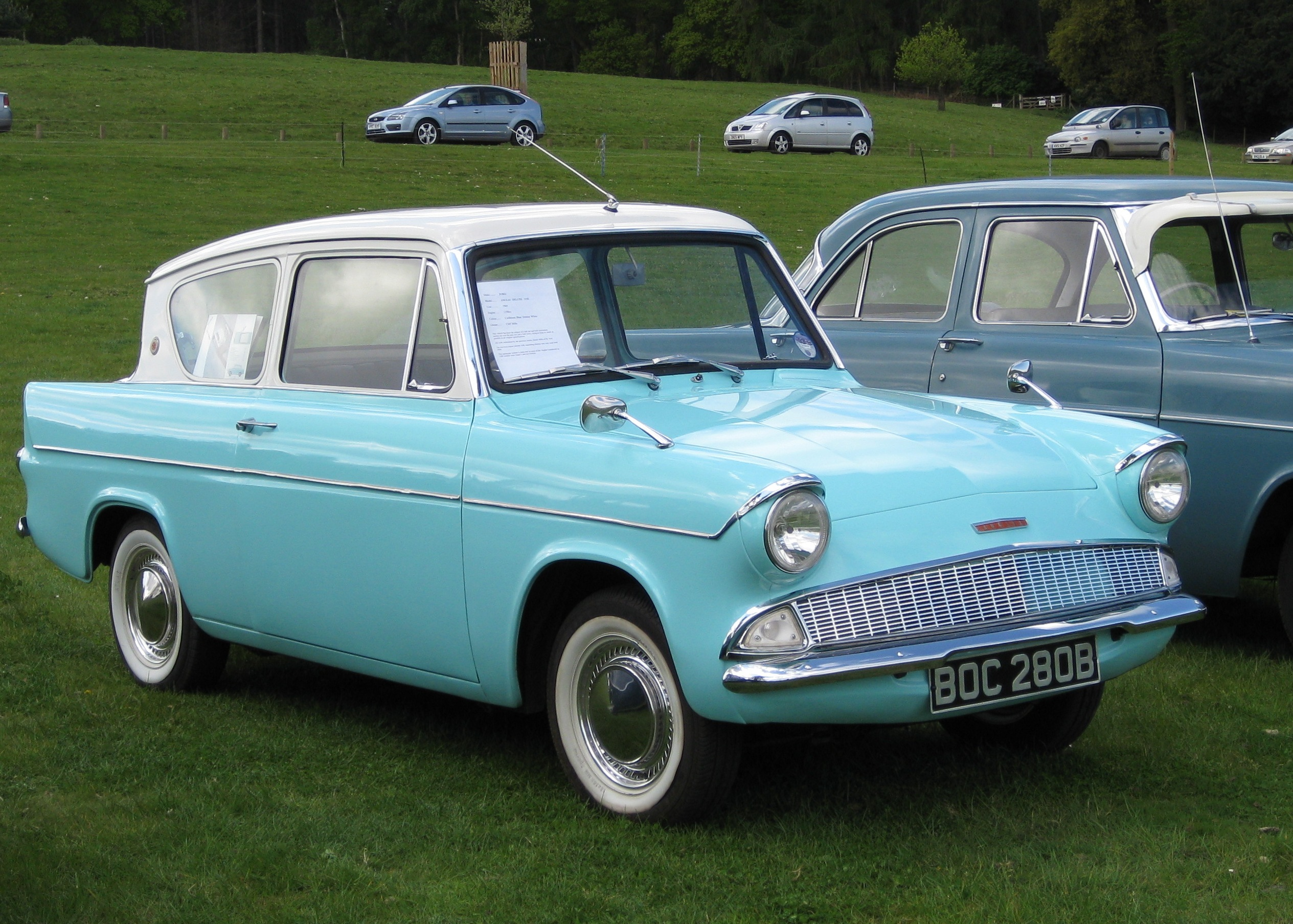
- 1964 Ford Anglia 105E Deluxe

Overview
- Production: 1959–1967; 1,004,737 units
- Assembly: United Kingdom: Dagenham (Ford Dagenham: 1959–1963); United Kingdom: Halewood (Halewood Body & Assembly: 1963–1967); Australia: Broadmeadows (Ford Australia); New Zealand: Lower Hutt (Ford New Zealand); Rhodesia: Salisbury (FMCR); South Africa: Port Elizabeth (FMCSA)
- Designer: Elwood Engel

Body and chassis
- Body style: 2-door saloon 3-door estate car 2-door panel van

Powertrain
- Engine: 997 cc Kent OHV I4; 1198 cc Kent OHV I4

Dimensions
- Wheelbase: 90.5 in (2,299 mm)
- Length: 154 in (3,912 mm)
- Width: 56 in (1,422 mm)
- Height: 56 in (1,422 mm)
- Curb weight: 1,624 lb (737 kg) (saloon)

The fourth Anglia model, the 105E, was introduced in 1959. Its American-influenced styling included a sweeping nose line, muted tailfins, and on Deluxe versions, a full-width slanted chrome grille in between prominent "eye" headlamps. Basic Anglias featured a narrower, painted grille. Its smoothly sloped line there looked more like a 1950s Studebaker (or even early Ford Thunderbird) than the more aggressive-looking late-'50s American Fords, possibly because its British designers used wind-tunnel testing and streamlining.

Like late-'50s Lincolns and Mercurys (and later the Citroën Ami of France and the Consul Classic), the car sported a backward-slanting rear window so that, according to contemporary marketing claims, it would remain clear in rain. In fact, that feature was copied from the 1958 Lincoln Continental, where it had been the accidental result of a design specification for an electrically opening (breezeway) rear window. An estate car joined the saloon in the line-up in September 1961. The instrument panel had a red light for the generator and a green one for the oil pressure.

The new styling was complemented by something the smaller Fords had needed for some time – a new engine. It was a 997 cc overhead valve (OHV), 39 bhp (29 kW) straight-four with an oversquare cylinder bore that became known as the Kent engine. Acceleration from rest was still sluggish, but it was much improved from earlier cars. Also new for British Fords was a four-speed manual gearbox with synchromesh on the top three forward gears. That was replaced by an all-synchromesh box in September 1962 (on 1198 cc powered cars). The notoriously feeble vacuum-powered windscreen wipers of earlier Anglias were replaced with more conventional electrically powered ones. The Macpherson-strut independent front suspension used on the 100E was retained.

In October 1962, 24-year-old twins Tony and Michael Brookes and a group of friends took an Anglia 105E fitted with the £13 Ford Performance Kit to Montlhéry Autodrome near Paris and captured six International Class G World Records averaging 83.47 mph (134 km/h). These were 4, 5, 6 and 7 days and nights and 15,000 and 20,000 km (9,320 and 12,400 mi). The Anglia's strength and durability meant only tyre changes were required.

The car's commercial success has subsequently been overshadowed by the even greater sales achieved by the Ford Cortina. In 1960, when 191,752 Anglias left Ford's Dagenham plant in the 105E's first full production year, it set a new production-volume record for Ford of Britain. From October 1963, production continued at Ford's new Halewood plant at Merseyside alongside the newly introduced Corsair models. The Anglia Super introduced in September 1962 (for the 1963 model year, accompanied by the Estate 1200) shared the longer-stroke 1198 cc version of the Kent engine from the newly introduced Ford Cortina. The Anglia Super was distinguished by its painted contrasting-coloured side stripe. Beginning towards the end of 1962, the 1.2-litre engine was made an available option to the Anglia Deluxe; this was discontinued in September 1965.

A new Anglia saloon tested by the British Motor magazine in 1959 had a top speed of 73.8 mph (118.8 km/h) and could accelerate from 0–60 mph (97 km/h) in 26.9 seconds. A fuel consumption of 41.2 miles per imperial gallon (6.86 L/100 km; 34.3 mpg_{‑US}) was recorded. The test car cost £610 including taxes of £180. The larger engine in the Anglia Super (123E series) produces 48.5 bhp (36.2 kW) at 4,800 rpm, enough for a claimed top speed just shy of 83 mph (134 km/h) and a 0–60 mph (97 km/h) time of around 20 seconds.

The old 100E Anglia became the new 100E Popular and the four-door Prefect bodyshell remained available as the new Ford Prefect (107E), which had all 105E running gear, including engine, gearbox and axle whilst retaining the 100E wheels, while the 100E Escort and Squire remained available, unchanged. In September 1961, three months after the arrival of the Van derivative, the Escort and Squire were replaced by the 105E Anglia estate. The 100E delivery van also gave way to a new vehicle based on the 105E.

In South Africa, the Anglia's popularity came late. Sales really took off in early 1966, with the local introduction of the Anglia Super, and 1967 was the car's best year, with a ninth place in overall automobile registrations. Production actually continued longer in South Africa than anywhere else; it was built alongside the Escort from remaining stock until at least the end of 1968.

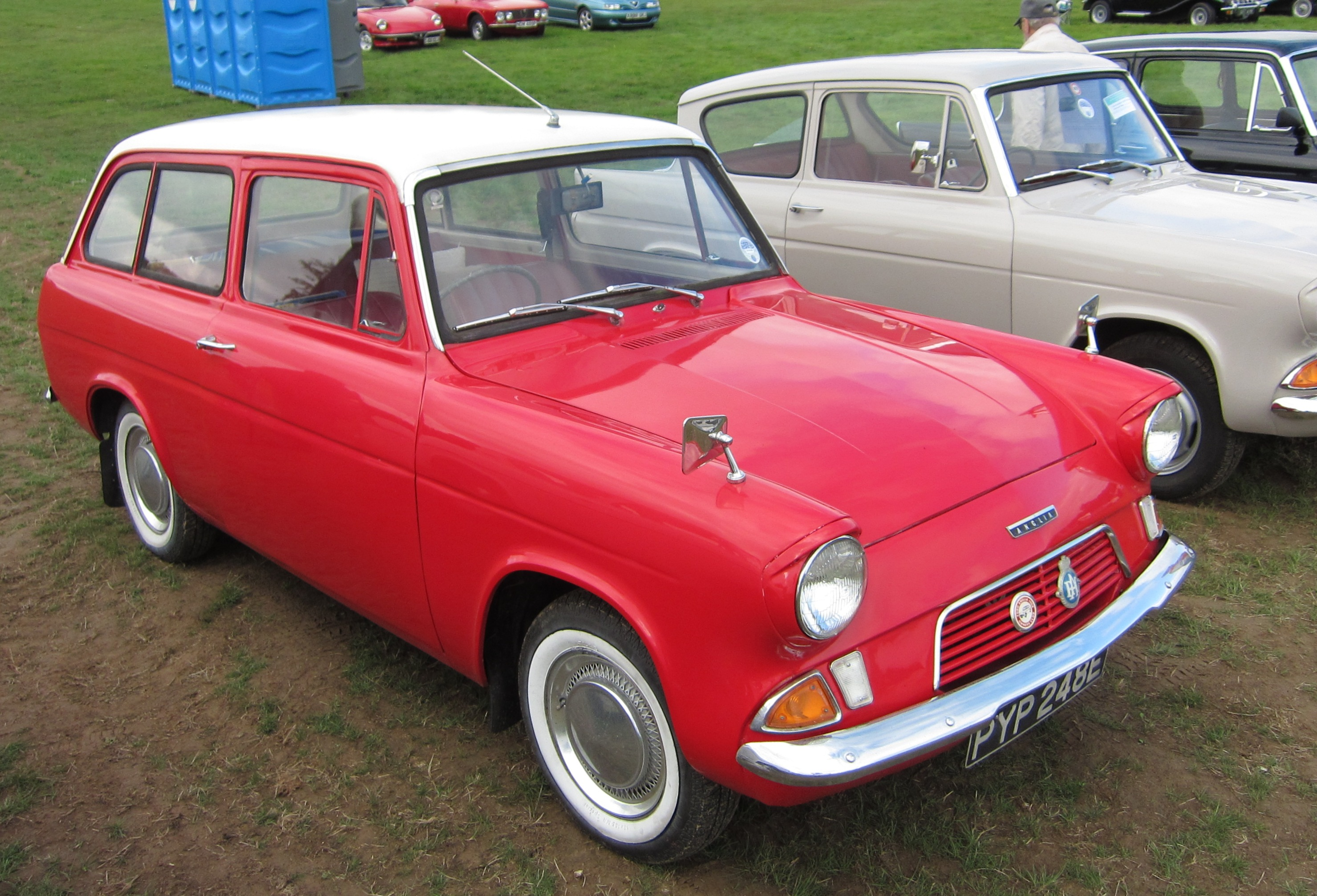
Ford Anglia 105E Estate: The basic Anglia 105E featured a smaller, painted grille with a chromed reveal, rendering it easily identifiable from the Deluxe 105E.

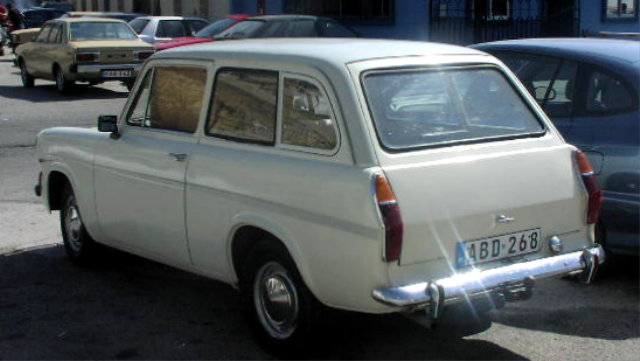
Ford Anglia 105E Estate

=== 105E-based Thames and Anglia Vans ===
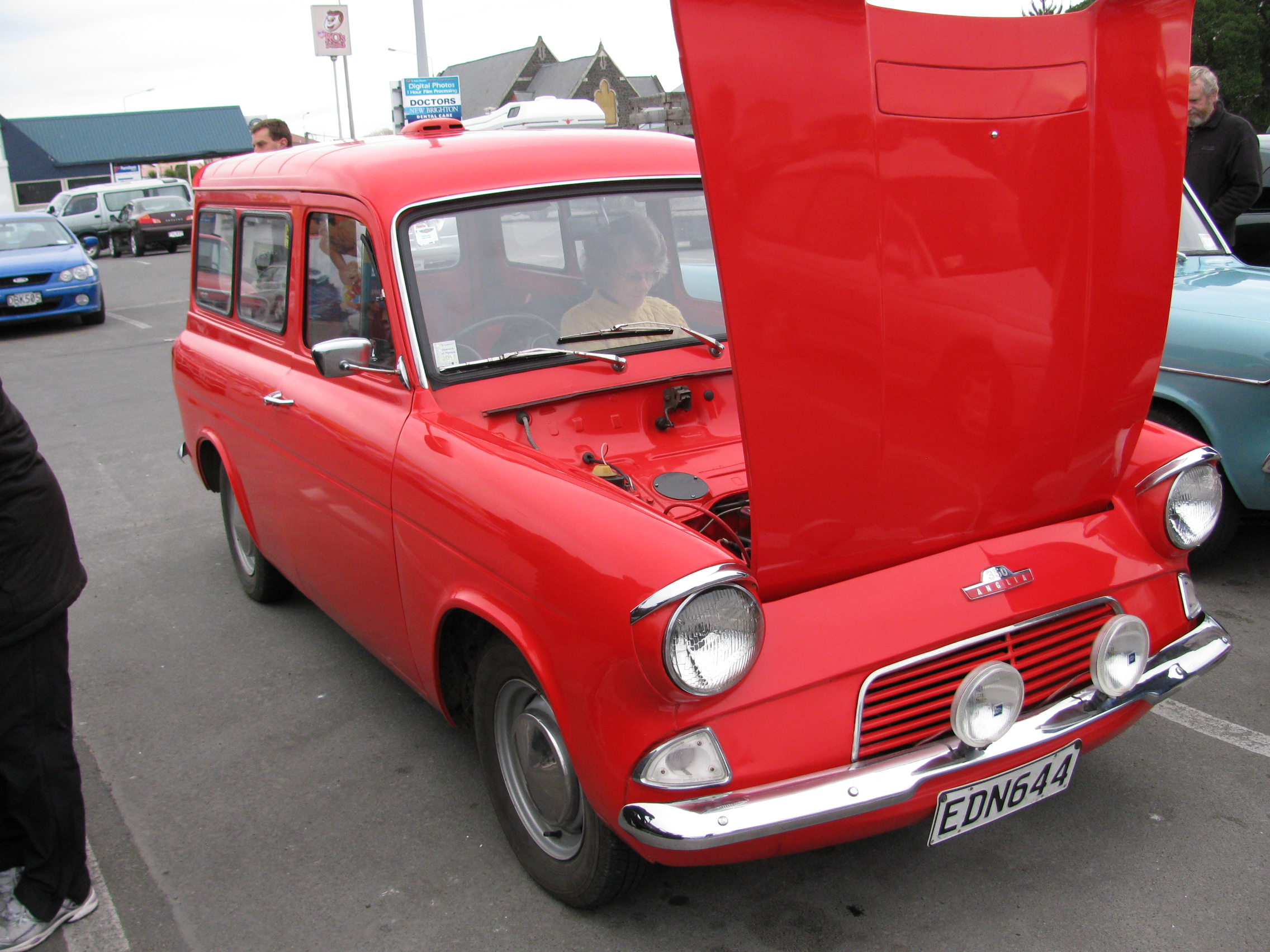
1964 Ford Anglia Van

The Anglia 105E-based Thames 307E 5 and 7 long cwt (560 and 780 lb; 250 and 360 kg) vans were first released in June 1961. They were fitted with the 997 cc engine from the Anglia 105E. Although they shared front body panels with the Anglia saloon, the vans were structurally quite different, with a taller windscreen and differently shaped passenger doors – which curved up to the rear along their bottom edges to avoid damage from kerbing. Left-hand drive export versions were designated Thames 308E. The Anglia name was also used for certain export markets.

From October 1962, the 5- and 7-cwt vans were also offered with the 1198 cc engine from the Ford Anglia Super and these were designated Thames 309E. Left hand drive export versions were designated Thames 310E.

In March 1965, the use of the Thames name was discontinued, and from that time, all Anglia-based vans were marketed as Ford Anglias. Production ended in November 1967 with a total of 205,001 vans having been produced.

=== Anglia Torino 105E (1965–1967) ===
Ford Anglia Torino 105E
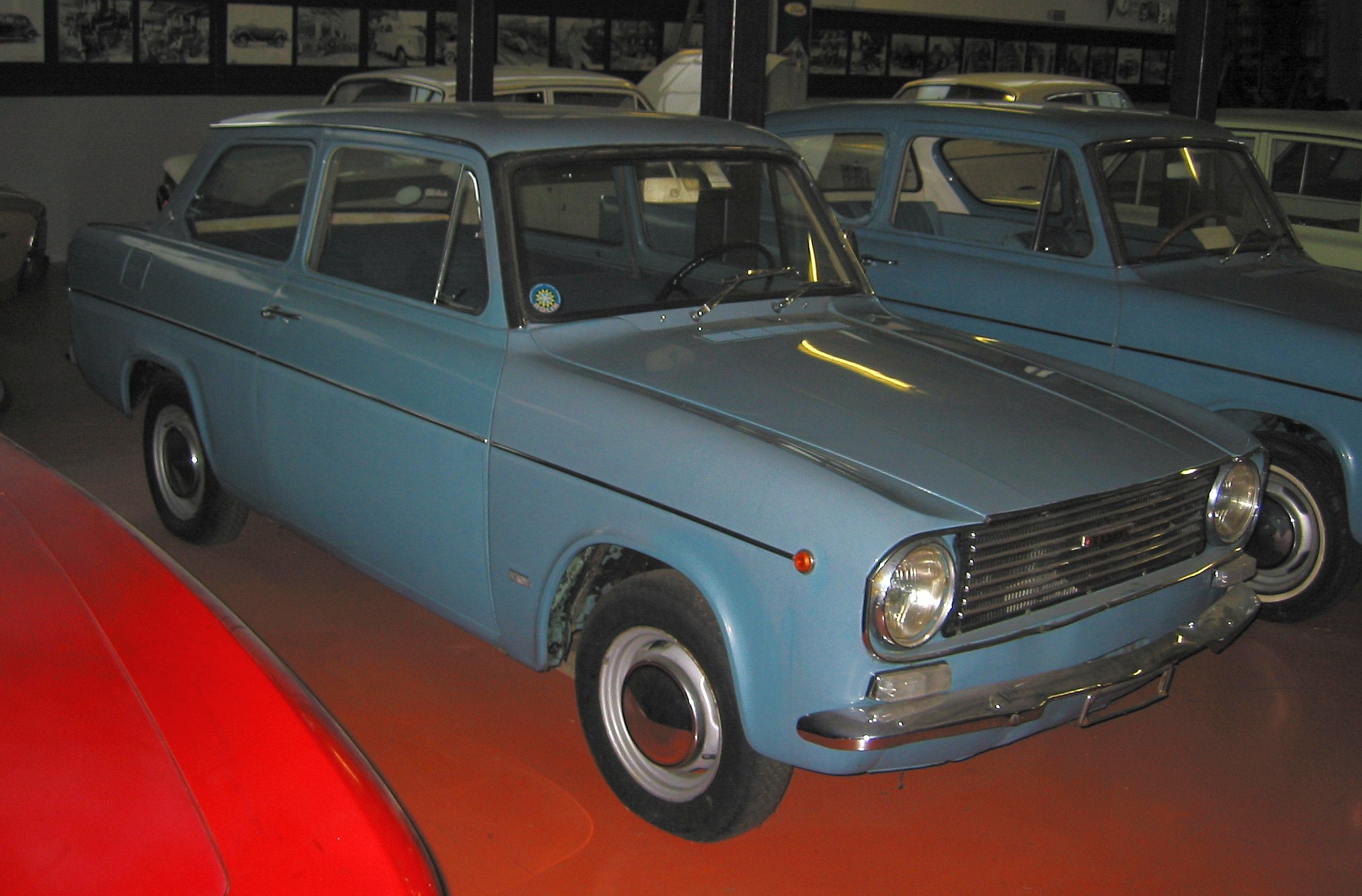
- Ford Anglia Torino 105E

Overview
- Production: 1965–1967
- Assembly: Italy: Turin (OFI); Belgium: Genk
- Designer: Giovanni Michelotti

Body and chassis
- Body style: 2-door saloon

Powertrain
- Engine: 997 cc I4

The Anglia Torino 105E was developed by the Italian subsidiary of Ford, using the chassis and mechanical components of the 105E Saloon, with new body panels. It was premiered at the 1964 Turin (Torino) Show. The Torino was styled by Giovanni Michelotti and built in Turin by Officine Stampaggi Industriali; 10,007 examples were sold in Italy. The model was also marketed in Belgium (where it was also assembled), the Netherlands, and Luxembourg.

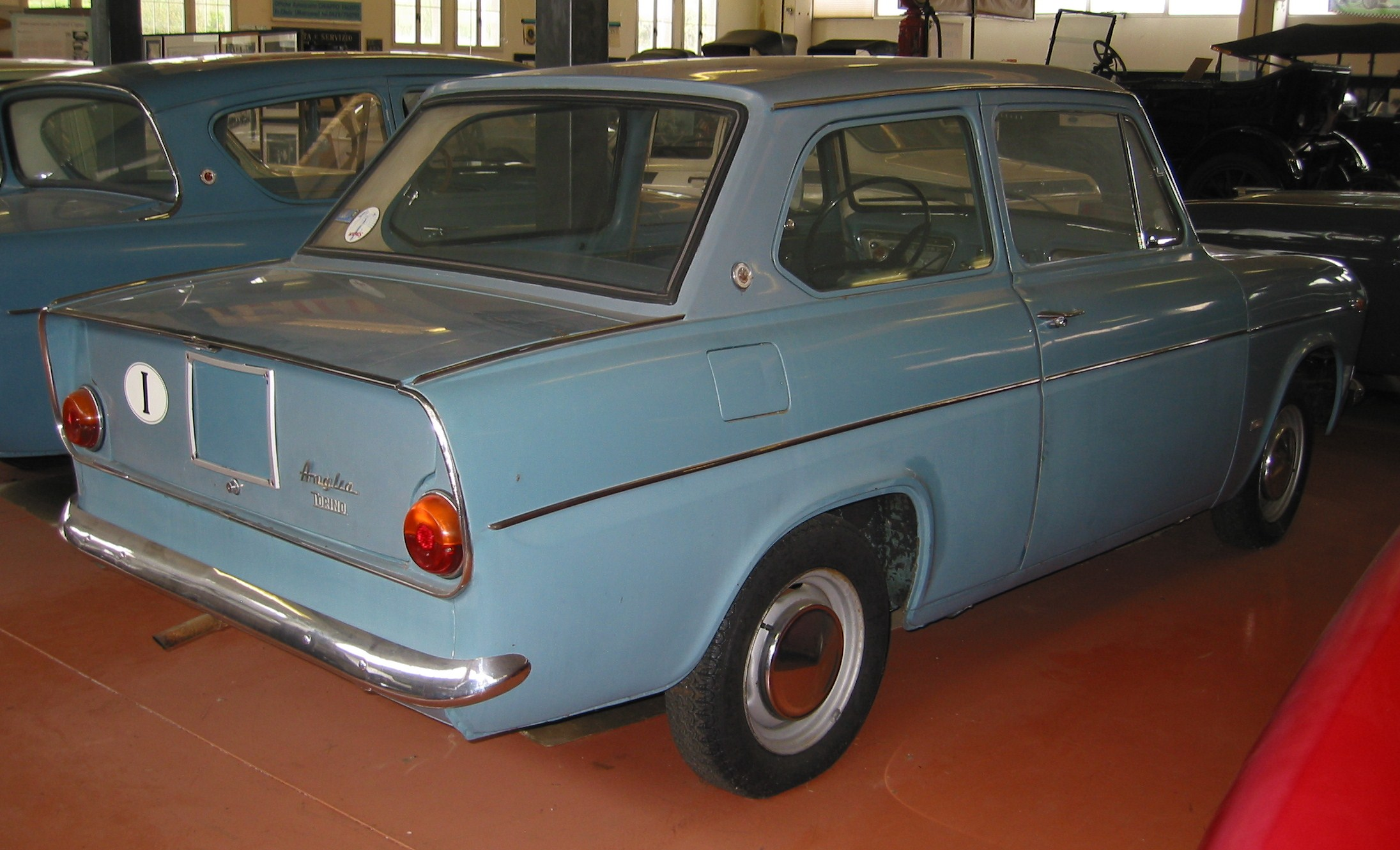
Ford Anglia Torino 105E

== Anglia Super 123E (1962–1967) ==
Ford Anglia Super 123E
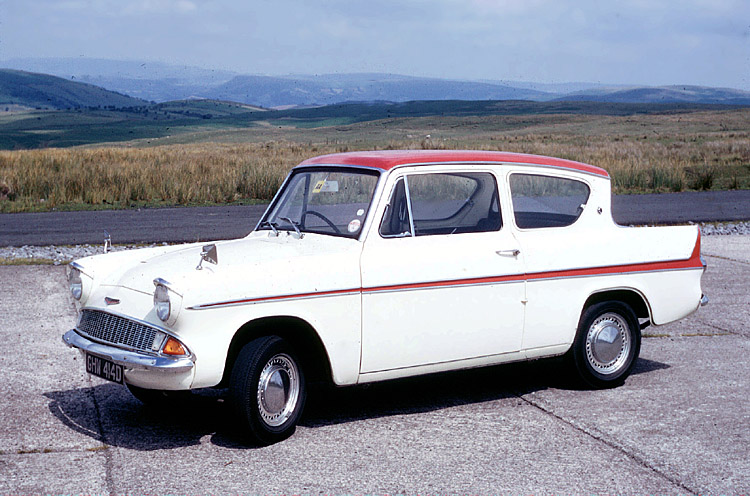
- 1966 Ford Anglia Super 123E saloon

Overview
- Production: 1962–1967; 79,223 units

Body and chassis
- Body style: 2-door saloon 3-door estate car 2-door panel van

Powertrain
- Engine: 1198 cc I4

From 1962, the 123E Anglia Super was available alongside the 105E, replacing the last of the line of Prefects, with a larger 1198 cc engine and other refinements.

The same car was also sold in continental Europe. One mainland Europe-only variant was the Anglia Sportsman, which carried its spare tyre on the back, somewhat similar to the continental kit often seen in the United States. Chrome bumper overriders, broad whitewall tyres and optionally a side stripe kicking up at the end into the taillights/fin were also fitted. The Super only arrived in South Africa in 1966, although it did boost sales considerably. Towards the end of the run, Ford experimented with two colours of metallic paint on the Anglia, "Blue Mink" and "Venetian Gold"; 250 were made in the blue and 500 were made in the gold.

Anglia saloons were provided with various levels of trim. The base model was the Standard, and this sported no chromework, painted rear light surrounds, steel-slatted grille, and limited interior trim. The Deluxe had a chrome side strip, chrome rear lights, glovebox lid, sun visor, and full-width chrome radiator grille. The top of the range was the Super, which had twin chrome side strips, contrasting coloured roof and side flash, plusher interior trim, together with the 1198 cc engine and a gearbox with synchromesh on first gear.

Optional extras were the mechanical upgrade of a Deluxe to a Super, retaining the Deluxe trim, or the upgrade of a Deluxe to a Super trim, but retaining the 997 cc engine, an option rarely taken up.

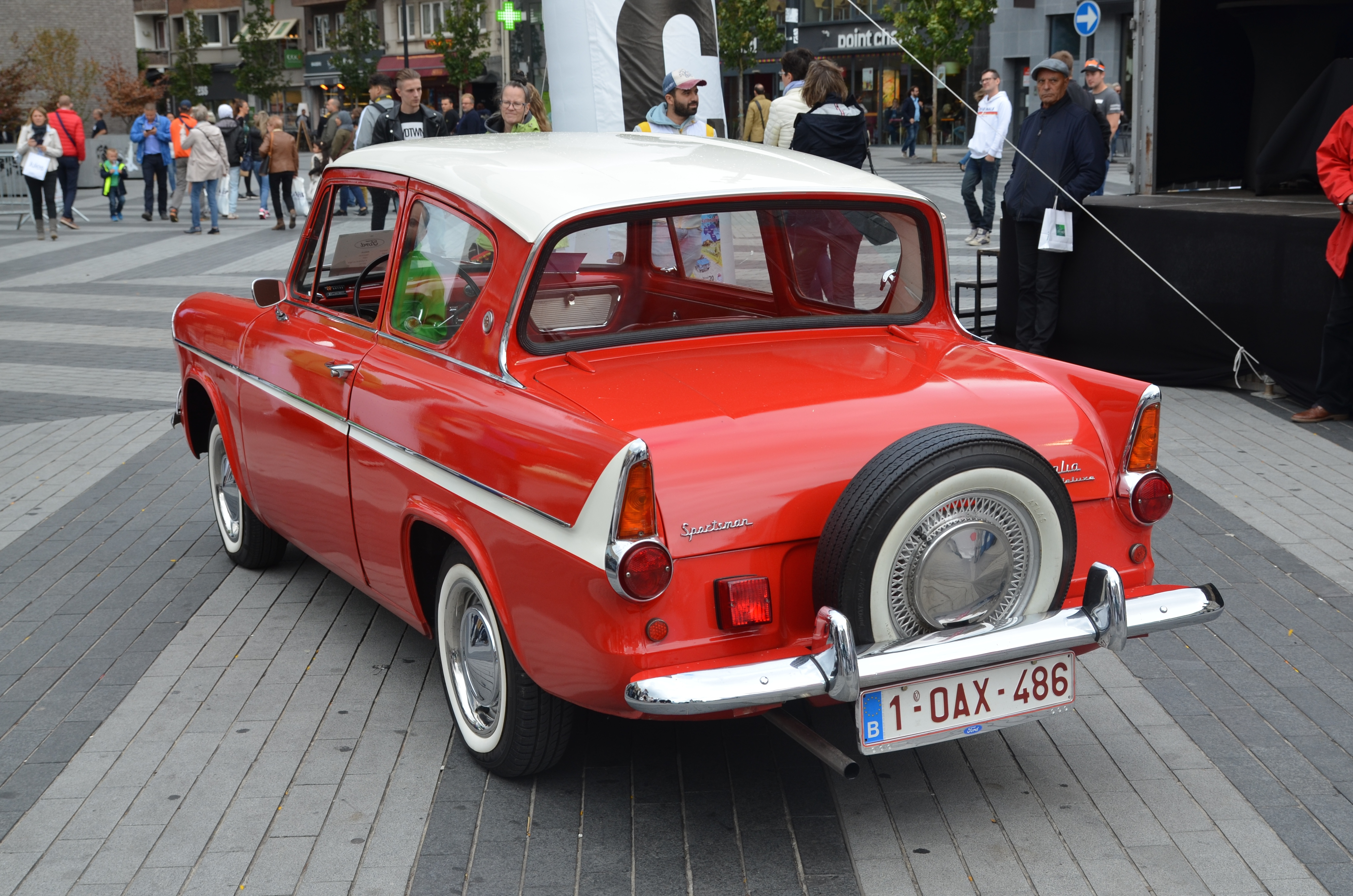
Ford Anglia Sportsman (1965)

== Scale models ==
Dinky Toys Ford Anglia die-cast scale model

- Meccano Dinky Toys; No. 155 (production 1961–1964), Anglia 105E deluxe with mostly red interior although a few have appeared with a blue interior, approximately O scale (1:43).
- Lesney Products "Matchbox" Series; No. 7b, (production 1961–1966), Anglia 105E with grey or black wheels, windows but no interior, approximately 00 scale.
- Lledo Vanguard series; No. unknown (production unknown 1996 - date (later production under Corgi Vanguards 1/43), Anglia 105E, approximately O scale (1:43)
- VV model no.1622
- Numerous models of a circa 1960 Anglia as portrayed in the Harry Potter series exist. One is the Lego set 4 Privet Drive (#75968).
- In 2024, Matchbox released Ford Anglia with and without opening doors and trunk in 1/64 scale in Harry Potter livery.
