= Ford Italia =

Italian subsidiary of the Ford Motor Company

Ford Italia S.p.A.
- Company type: Subsidiary
- Industry: Automotive
- Founded: 1923; 103 years ago
- Founder: Henry Ford
- Headquarters: Rome, Lazio, Italy
- Products: Automobiles
- Parent: Ford of Europe
- Website: ford.it

Ford Italia S.p.A., previously Ford Italiana S.A. and Ford Motor Company Italia, is the Italian subsidiary of the United States–based automaker Ford Motor Company.

== Company history ==
Ford founded the Ford Motor Company Italia in Trieste in 1923 to assemble automobiles. The company moved to Bologna in 1933. After the Second World War, the company was renamed Ford Italiana SA. In 1959, it moved to Rome. By 1964, their only independent model was the Ford Anglia Torino. Production ended in 1967, and the company still exists today as Ford Italia S.p.A.

== Vehicles ==
First, the models Ford Model T and Ford Model TT and Fordson Tractor were produced. The Ford Anglia Torino was introduced on the basis of the Ford Anglia 105E in 1964. Giovanni Michelotti had revised the bodywork and in particular replaced the rear-sloping rear window. Production took place at OSI. Production of the model ended in 1967. A total of 10,000 copies were sold in Italy.
