= Ford Popular =

- 1957 Ford Popular (103E)

Overview
- Manufacturer: Ford UK
- Production: 1953–1962

The Ford Popular, often called the Ford Pop, is a car from Ford UK that was built in England between 1953 and 1962. When launched, it was Britain's lowest priced car.

The name Popular was also used by Ford to describe its 1930s Y Type model. The Popular name was also later used on basic models of the Escort and Fiesta cars.

== Ford Popular 103E ==
Ford Popular 103E
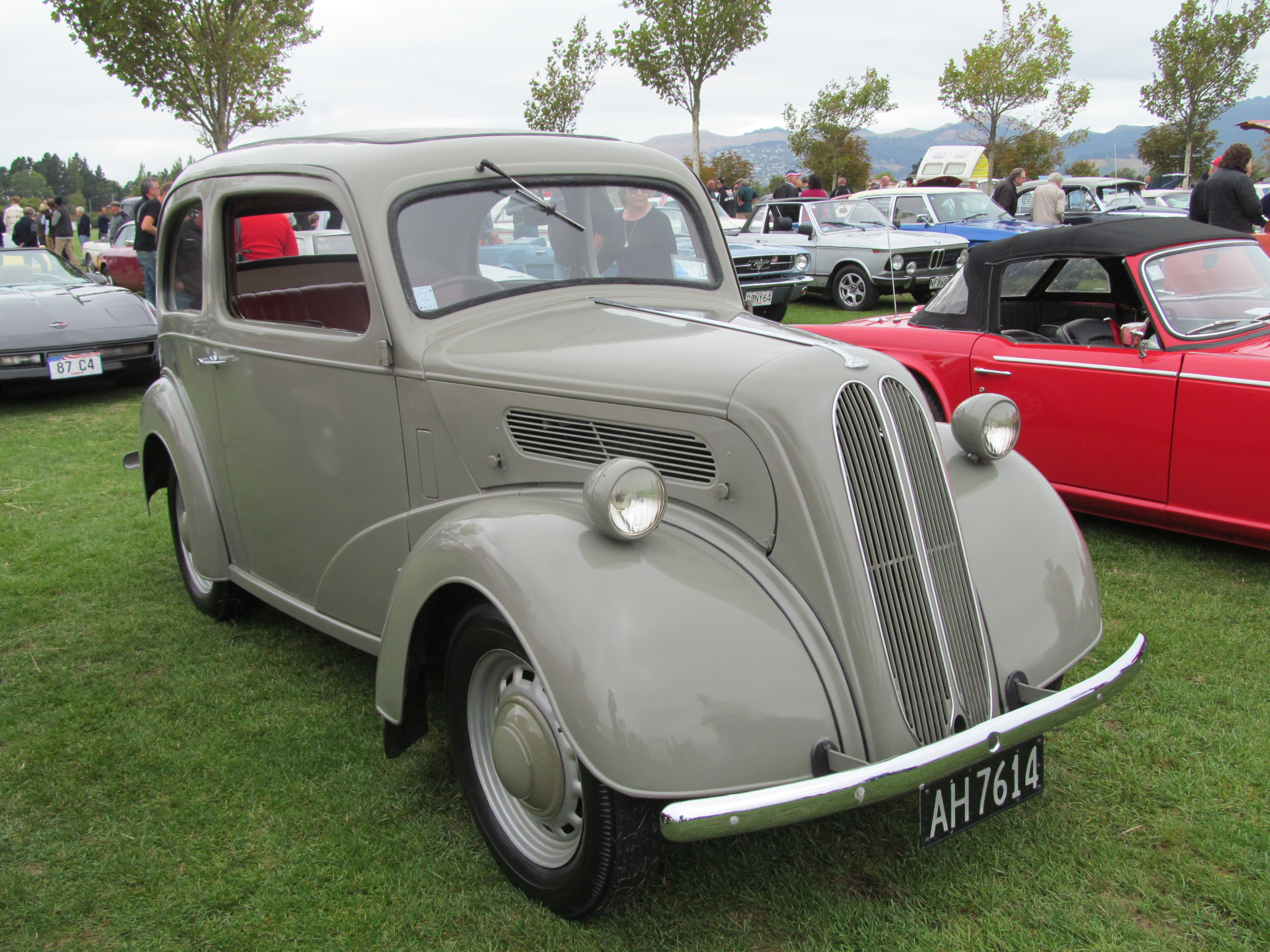

Overview
- Production: 1953–1959
- Assembly: United Kingdom: Dagenham (Ford Dagenham); Australia: Geelong, Victoria (Ford Australia)

Body and chassis
- Body style: two door saloon two door coupe utility (Australia) chassis-cowl (Australia)
- Related: Ford Anglia

Powertrain
- Engine: 1172 cc side-valve I4; 30 bhp
- Transmission: 3-speed manual

Dimensions
- Wheelbase: 90 in (2,286 mm)
- Length: 151.5 in (3,848 mm)
- Width: 56.5 in (1,435 mm)
- Height: 64.5 in (1,638 mm)
- Kerb weight: 1,624 lb (737 kg)

Chronology
- Successor: Ford Popular 100E

When production of the older Ford Anglia and Ford Prefect was stopped in 1953 the Popular was developed as a budget alternative, based on the old, pre-war style E494A Anglia. The E494A was, in turn, a facelift of the Anglia E04A, which was a facelifted version of the 7Y, itself a rebodied Model Y. Thus through several adjustments, updates and name changes, a design with provenance dating back to 1932 was produced by Ford for 27 years. It was powered by a Ford Sidevalve 1172 cc, 30 bhp (22 kW), four-cylinder engine. The car was very basic. It had a single vacuum-powered wiper, no heater, vinyl trim, and very little chrome; even the bumpers were painted, and the bakelite dashboard of the Anglia was replaced by a flat steel panel. The Popular 103E differed visually from the Anglia E494E in having smaller headlights and a lack of trim on the side of the bonnet. Early 103Es had the three spoke banjo type Anglia/Prefect steering wheel as stocks of these were used up, but most have a two spoke wheel similar to the 100E wheel but in brown. Early Populars also had the single centrally mounted tail/stop-lamp of the Anglia, but this changed to a two tail/stop lamp set up with the lamps mounted on the mudguards and a separate number plate lamp. In total, 155,340 Popular E103s were produced.

This car proved successful because, while on paper it was a sensible alternative to a clean, late-model used car, in practice there were no clean late-model used cars available in postwar Britain owing to the six-year halt in production caused by the Second World War. This problem was compounded by stringent export quotas that made obtaining a new car in the late 1940s and into the early 1950s difficult, and covenants forbidding new-car buyers from selling for up to three years after delivery. Unless the purchaser could pay the extra £100 or so for an Anglia 100E, Austin A30 or Morris Minor, the choice was the Popular or a pre-war car. Electrics were 6 volts, a provided starting handle often necessary. Braking was done by rod operated drums, and synchromesh was only on 2nd and top gear. The boot was accessed with a coach key, there was no heater or demister, and turn indication was performed by semaphors. Starting the car was done by pull-wire starter, and the carburetor was operated by manual choke. Also, there was no water pump, and engine cooling was done via thermosyphon. In short, this was very basic motoring.

In later years, these cars became popular as hot rods, starting in the late 1950s, when people started drag racing them due to their lightweight construction. This practice started in the United States with Ford's 1932 Model B/18, while the Ford "Pop" as it was affectionately known became the definitive British hot rod – a reduced sized but readily available British alternative, a role it still plays today to a considerable extent.

A car tested by The Motor magazine in 1954 had a top speed of 60.3 mph (97.0 km/h) and could accelerate from 0-50 mph (80 km/h) in 24.1 seconds. A fuel consumption of 36.4 miles per imperial gallon (7.8 L/100 km; 30.3 mpg_{‑US}) was recorded. The test car cost £390 including taxes.

=== In Australia ===
The Popular 103E was available in Australia up to 1955 as a two-door coupe utility and also in chassis-cowl form to accept custom built bodywork. It utilised the 94 inch wheelbase of the Ford Prefect with 103E front panels. The utility was designated as 103E-67 and the chassis-cowl model as 103E-84. The Popular utility differed from its Anglia A494A utility predecessor in that the Popular did not have running boards whereas the Anglia did.

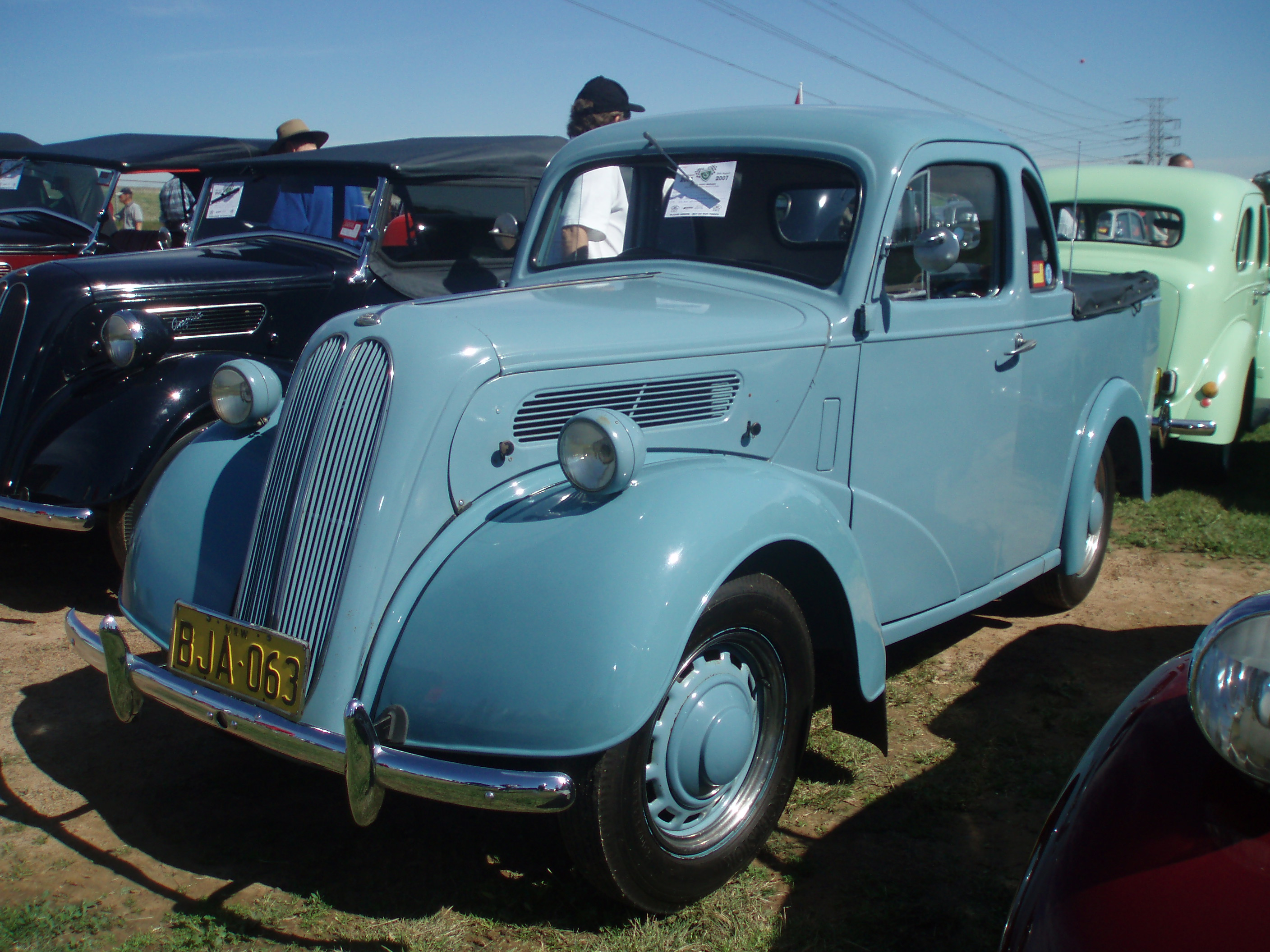
1954 Ford Popular 103E Coupe Utility

== Ford Popular 100E ==
Ford Popular 100E
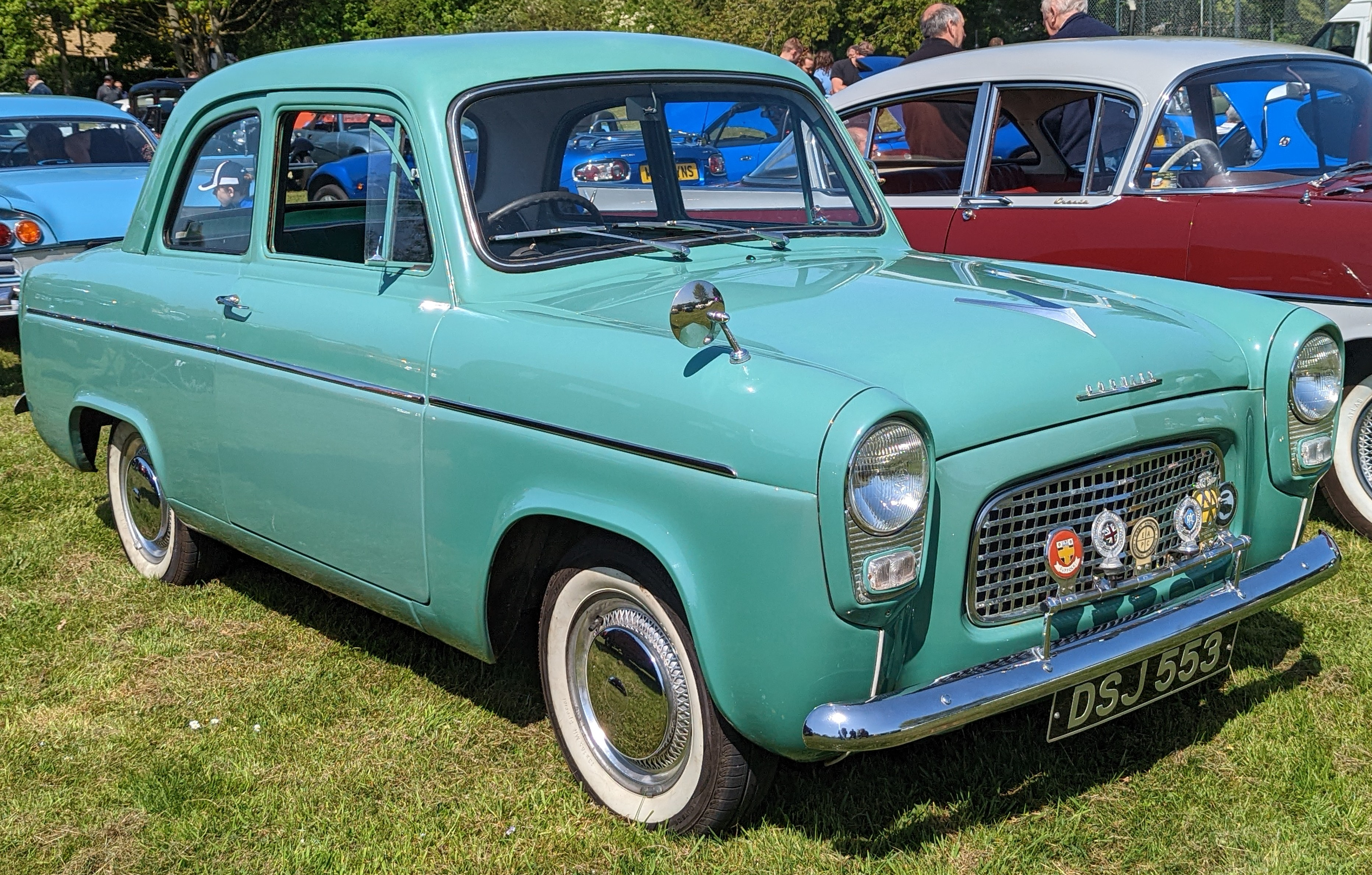

Overview
- Production: 1959–1962
- Assembly: United Kingdom: Dagenham (Ford Dagenham)

Body and chassis
- Body style: 2-door saloon
- Related: Ford Anglia

Powertrain
- Engine: 1,172 cc (71.5 cu in) straight-4 side-valve
- Transmission: 3-speed manual

Dimensions
- Wheelbase: 87 in (2,210 mm)
- Length: 149.75 in (3,804 mm)
- Width: 60.75 in (1,543 mm)
- Height: 58.75 in (1,492 mm)
- Kerb weight: 1,708 lb (775 kg)

Chronology
- Predecessor: Ford Popular 103E
- Successor: Ford Anglia

In 1959 the old Popular was replaced by a new version that was in production until 1962. Like the previous version it used a superseded Anglia body shell, this time that of the 100E, and it was powered by a strengthened 1172 cc sidevalve engine producing 36 bhp. The brakes were now hydraulic with 8 in (203 mm) drums all round. The new Popular offered 1,000 mile (1,500 km in metric countries) service intervals, like its predecessor, but it only had 13 grease points as against its predecessor's 23 (or 28 for the pre-war cars). The basic model stripped out many fittings from the Anglia but there was a large list of extras available and also a De Luxe version which supplied many as standard. 126,115 Popular 100Es were built.

The Motor magazine tested a 100E in 1960 and found it to have a top speed of 69.9 mph (112.5 km/h), acceleration from 0–50 mph (80 km/h) in 19.6 seconds and a fuel consumption of 33.2 miles per imperial gallon (8.5 L/100 km; 27.6 mpg_{‑US}). The test car cost £494 including taxes with a comment that it was the lowest-priced orthodox saloon on the British Market.

In 1960, the manufacturer's recommended retail price of £494 was equivalent to 26 weeks' worth of the average UK wage. The £100 charged in 1935 and the £1,299 charged for the Ford Escort Popular in 1975 both also amounted to 26 weeks' worth of average wage for the years in question. In the 1950s, however, the country had been undergoing a period of above average austerity: in 1953 the car's £390 sticker price represented 40 weeks' worth of the average UK wage.

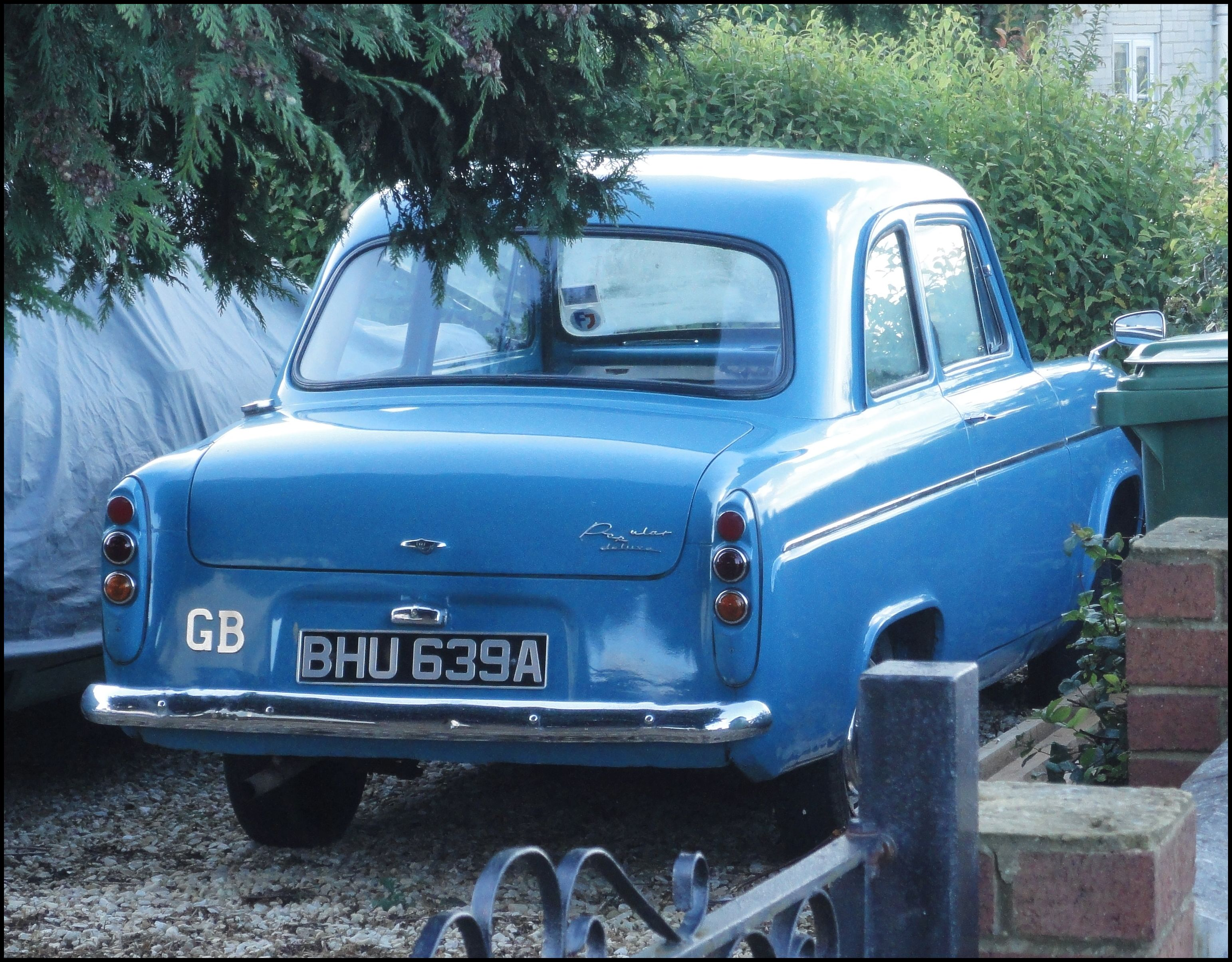
Ford Popular deluxe (100E)

== Popular trim level ==
In 1975, the Popular name was revived as a base trim level of the newly released Ford Escort Mk2. This model featured a standard 1.1 litre OHV Kent engine, 12-inch wheels with cross ply tyres and drum brakes all round. The 1975 Ford Escort Popular was the first Ford to carry that name which also featured a heater as standard equipment. The "Popular" trim level proved long-standing across the Ford range, featuring on later Escort's and the Fiesta, from 1980 to 1991. A 'Popular Plus' variant was also available.

== In popular culture ==
Season 3, Episode 2 of Monty Python's Flying Circus was titled "Mr and Mrs Brian Norris' Ford Popular" leading with a sketch featuring the aforenamed couple and their car which parodied documentaries of famous expeditions.

A 1960 Popular also appears in the music video for Phil Collins' "Take Me Home".
