= Vanwall Vandervell =

Battery electric compact crossover SUV

Overview
- Manufacturer: Vanwall
- Production: 2025–present
- Assembly: Germany: Greding

Body and chassis
- Class: Compact crossover SUV
- Body style: 5-door SUV
- Layout: Rear-motor, rear-wheel-drive; Dual-motor, all-wheel-drive
- Platform: Hyundai E-GMP
- Related: Hyundai Ioniq 5 N

Powertrain
- Power output: 321–653 hp (239–487 kW; 325–662 PS)
- Transmission: Single-speed gear reduction
- Battery: 84 kWh NMC SK On
- Plug-in charging: DC: 238 kW

Dimensions
- Kerb weight: Under 2,000 kg (4,409 lb)

The Vanwall Vandervell is an electric high-performance hatchback produced by the British marque Vanwall. It draws its name from the company’s founder Tony Vandervell and the historic racing heritage of the original Vanwall team. It is based on the Hyundai Ioniq 5 N, with the body restyled with carbon fiber panels in a manner resembling the Lancia Delta HF. Vanwall claims the carbon fiber body reduces weight by 230 kilograms (507 lb) compared to the original Ioniq 5 N, reducing 0–100 km/h (62 mph) times from 3.6 seconds to 3.0 seconds.
