= Sakuu =

American battery manufacturer

Sakuu Corporation
- Type: Private
- Industry: Energy storage, 3D printing
- Founded: 2016; 10 years ago
- Founder: Robert Bagheri
- Headquarters: San Jose, California, United States
- Website: sakuu.com

Sakuu is an American battery manufacturing equipment supplier founded in 2016 that produces technology for creating electrodes and lithium metal battery cells through additive manufacturing.

Sakuu's Kavian 3D printing platform prints battery electrodes in custom shapes, sizes, chemistries, and compositions. The company opened a battery printing and engineering facility in August 2022.

In 2023, Sakuu announced it would merge with a special purpose acquisition company (SPAC) to be listed on a US stock exchange, but the deal was subsequently cancelled. In July 2024, Sakuu announced a joint development agreement with SK On; central to the agreement is the industrialization of the dry process Kavian platform.

== History ==
Sakuu was founded as KeraCel in San Jose, California, in 2016 by Robert Bagheri. The company initially focused on solid-state battery structures and additive manufacturing methods for energy-storage devices, filing its first patent for a solid-state battery structure in 2017 and developing its first electrochemical material set in 2018. By 2019, the company had developed a multi-material, multi-process printing platform, and in 2020 it 3D printed its first ceramic battery.

In April 2021, KeraCel changed its name to Sakuu Corporation to align the company with its additive manufacturing platform, which was designed to print complex functional devices, with solid-state batteries as its initial application. In 2022, the company opened a 79,000-square-foot battery printing and engineering hub in Silicon Valley, following the opening of its battery pilot line and a $62 million follow-on funding round.

In March 2023, Sakuu announced a proposed business combination with Plum Acquisition Corp. I, a special purpose acquisition company, which would have made Sakuu a publicly traded company at an implied enterprise value of about $705 million. The transaction did not close; in June 2023, Plum disclosed in a Form 8-K that it had received a termination notice from Sakuu, effective June 14, 2023.
