= Battery industry of South Korea =

Global lithium-ion battery market share (2011)
1. Samsung SDI (23.6%)
2. LG Chem (16.4%)
3. Other (60.0%)

The battery industry of South Korea is one of the largest in the world, primarily represented by the companies LG Energy Solution, SK On, and Samsung SDI. They began to expand production globally in the beginning of the 21st century. However, they kept "R&D, pilot production, and quality control" in domestic "mother" factories. Korean companies began shifting their focus from NCM to LFP in the mid-2020s due to shifts in the market.

== History ==
SK began battery development in the 1980s, with LG following suit in the decade after. LG started mass production of lithium-ion batteries in 1999 and Samsung completed its first cell plant the year after. LG began supplying EV batteries in 2009 with the Chevrolet Volt, and SK built its first mass production line in 2012. The companies expanded their presence across Asia, Europe, and North America.

In 2011, South Korea became the world's top battery producer after overtaking Japan's market share in small lithium-ion batteries.

In 2015, China introduced a key rule that – in Xie's words – "walled off" its huge domestic market for Chinese battery firms. EV makers were mandated to use batteries produced by one of the selected suppliers if their cars were to qualify for consumer subsidies. All of the 57 companies that appeared on a government "white list" turned out to be Chinese.

"It was very cleverly designed technical specifications that narrowly defined that only Chinese battery companies would be eligible," Xie says. At that time, some South Korean companies had already started building factories in China, "only to find out that they were completely shut out the market", she adds.

In April 2019, LG Chem sued SK Innovation in the US for stealing trade secrets. In February 2020, the United States International Trade Commission ruled in favor of LG and banned SK from importing materials for its plant in Commerce, Georgia. The conflict drew concern and criticism from both South Korean and American officials. In April 2021, days before US President Joe Biden's deadline to potentially overrule the ITC decision, SK agreed to settle and pay LG $1.8 billion in cash and royalties instead. They also agreed on not suing each other for 10 years.

Starting in 2019, Korean battery firms began establishing joint ventures in North America, which was encouraged by tax credits from the Inflation Reduction Act (IRA) in 2022. These factories, built in partnership with automotive manufacturers such as General Motors, Ford, Stellantis, Honda, and Hyundai Motor Company, would form parts of the "Battery Belt".

In December 2020, LG Chem spun off its battery division as LG Energy Solution. In July 2021, the Moon Jae-in government announced the "K-battery strategy," South Korea's first "comprehensive, battery-specific state industrial policy." In October, SK Innovation spun off its battery division as SK On.

Between 2022 and 2025, three of the joint ventures' employees gained union representation by the United Auto Workers. BlueOval SK contested the results of its 2025 vote, even as it announced the layoffs of its entire workforce later that year.

South Korean firms made a strategic error by expanding aggressively in the U.S. and Europe just as EV sales slowed in 2024.

In May 2024, the US government agreed to delay IRA restrictions on Chinese graphite until the end of 2026, granting battery manufacturers time to find and switch to alternative sources of the anode material. The restriction would have affected subsidies for over 30 vehicles involving the three major Korean battery manufacturers. The Korean government committed 9.7 trillion won to support the transition.

"China's domestic market provided ample opportunities for the Chinese homegrown battery firms to develop their technologies beyond tests within laboratories whereas Korean firms lacked such chances," said the official.

In July 2025, US president Donald Trump signed the One Big Beautiful Bill Act, which included provisions to prematurely end electric vehicle subsidies by September of that year. South Korean battery firms began winding down their American joint venture projects and dividing ownership of sites. They also began shifting focus from EVs to energy storage. This period also marked the shift from South Korea's traditional focus on higher-end nickel-manganese-cobalt (NCM) batteries to the lithium iron phosphate (LFP) batteries Chinese companies had specialized in. In September 2025, hundreds of South Korean workers were detained at a Hyundai-LG battery factory in the US's largest single-site homeland security operation, sparking international outrage.

“Halt investments in the U.S. immediately. Restore the dignity of the workers. If not, this will inevitably happen again,” said Um Mi-kyung, the KCTU’s acting secretary general. “We will fight to the very end to put an end to these U.S. investments that are destroying Korea’s domestic economy and dismantling our manufacturing industry.”

== South Korean battery manufacturing sites ==
Domestic
#	Group	Factory location			Year initial phase construction completed	Year battery operations started	Reference
#	Group	Country	Region	City	Year initial phase construction completed	Year battery operations started	Reference
1	LG	South Korea	North Chungcheong Province	Cheongju	-	-	
2	Samsung	South Korea	-	Ulsan	-	-	
3	Samsung	South Korea	South Chungcheong Province	Cheonan	-	-	
4	SK	South Korea	South Chungcheong Province	Seosan	-	-	

International
#	Group	Factory location			Year initial phase construction completed	Year battery operations started	Reference
#	Group	Country	Region	City	Year initial phase construction completed	Year battery operations started	Reference
1	LG	China	Jiangsu	Nanjing	2004	-	
2	Samsung	Malaysia	Negeri Sembilan	Seremban	-	2012	
3	LG	United States	Michigan	Holland	2012	-	
4	Samsung	China	Shaanxi	Xi'an	2015	-	
5	LG	Poland	Lower Silesian Voivodeship	Wrocław	-	2016	
6	Samsung	Hungary	Pest County	Göd	2017	2018	
7	SK	China	Jiangsu	Changzhou	-	2020	
8	SK	Hungary	Komárom-Esztergom County	Komárom	-	2020	
9	SK	China	Guangdong	Huizhou	-	2021	
10	SK	China	Jiangsu	Yancheng	-	2021	
11	SK	United States	Georgia	Commerce	-	2022	
12	LG	United States	Ohio	Warren	-	2022	
13	LG	United States	Tennessee	Spring Hill	-	2024	
14	Samsung	United States	Indiana	Kokomo	-	2024	
15	SK	Hungary	Fejér County	Iváncsa	-	2024	
16	SK	United States	Georgia	Kingston	-	2026	
17	LG	United States	Michigan	Lansing	-	2026	

== See also ==
- EcoPro
- POSCO Future M
- Hwaseong battery factory fire
