= Hyundai Ioniq 5 =

Battery electric compact crossover SUV

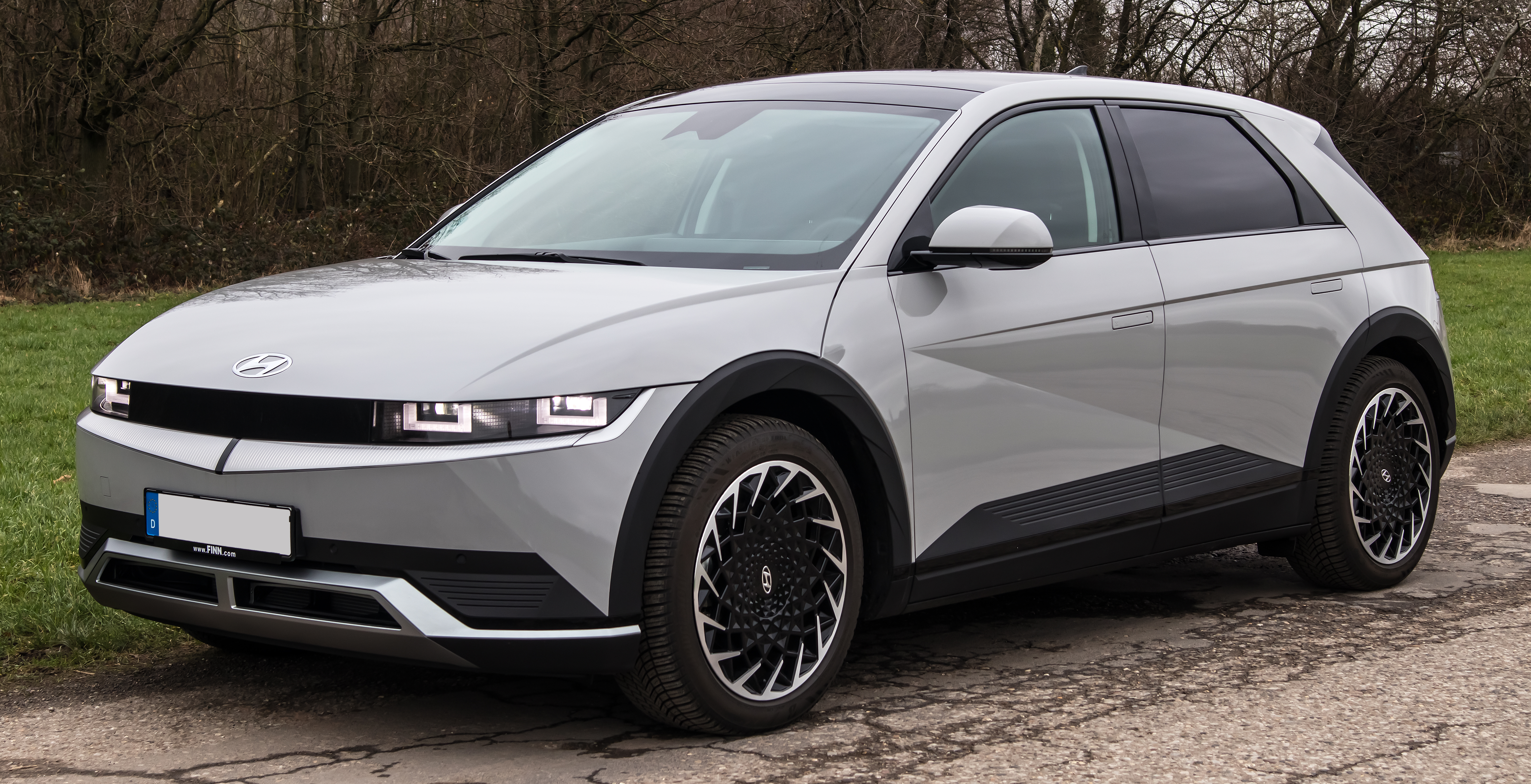

Overview
- Manufacturer: Hyundai
- Model code: NE
- Production: March 2021 – present
- Model years: 2022–present (North America)
- Assembly: South Korea: Ulsan (Ulsan Plant 1); United States: Bryan County, Georgia (HMG Metaplant America, 2024–present); Indonesia: Cikarang, West Java (HMMI); Singapore: Jurong (HMGICS); India: Chennai (HMIL); Thailand: Samut Prakan (HMMT); Vietnam: Ninh Bình (HTMV)
- Designer: Lee Ji-hyeon

Body and chassis
- Class: Compact crossover SUV
- Body style: 5-door SUV
- Layout: Rear-motor, rear-wheel-drive; Dual-motor, all-wheel-drive
- Platform: Hyundai E-GMP
- Related: Hyundai Ioniq 6; Hyundai Ioniq 9; Kia EV6; Kia EV9; Genesis GV60

Powertrain
- Electric motor: EM07/EM17 permanent magnet synchronous motor
- Transmission: Imitation of 8-speed gearbox on IONIQ 5N
- Battery: 58–84 kWh SK On NMC lithium-ion
- Electric range: 58 kWh: 220 mi (354 km) (EPA); 63 kWh: 245 mi (394 km) (EPA); 77.4 kWh: 256–303 mi (412–488 km) (EPA); 84 kWh: 259–318 mi (417–512 km) (EPA)
- Plug-in charging: 11 kW (AC); 175 kW (DC, 58 kWh); 233 kW (DC, 77.4 kWh); 257 kW (DC, 84 kWh, CCS adapter)

Dimensions
- Wheelbase: 3,000 mm (118.1 in)
- Length: 4,635 mm (182.5 in) (pre-facelift); 4,655 mm (183.3 in) (facelift); 4,715 mm (185.6 in) (Ioniq 5 N)
- Width: 1,890 mm (74.4 in); 1,940 mm (76.4 in) (Ioniq 5 N)
- Height: 1,605 mm (63.2 in); 1,585 mm (62.4 in) (Ioniq 5 N)
- Kerb weight: 1,800–2,020 kg (3,968–4,453 lb) (58/63 kWh); 1,905–2,125 kg (4,200–4,685 lb) (72.6 kWh/77.4 kWh); 1,985–2,160 kg (4,376–4,762 lb) (84 kWh); 2,205–2,235 kg (4,861–4,927 lb) (Ioniq 5 N)

The Hyundai Ioniq 5 (Korean: 현대 아이오닉 5) is a battery electric compact crossover SUV produced by Hyundai since 2021.

It is the first product to be marketed under the Ioniq sub-brand, and the first model developed on the Hyundai Electric Global Modular Platform (E-GMP).

== Overview ==
Hyundai presented the Ioniq 5 globally on 23 February 2021. Its design was previewed by the Hyundai 45 EV Concept which was presented at the Frankfurt Motor Show in September 2019. Both the concept car and the production version are inspired by the original Hyundai Pony, and features a theme, marketed as Parametric Pixel, applied to the headlights, tail lights, and wheels. The vehicle's clamshell bonnet spans the entire width with the 20-inch aerodynamic wheels. The "45" describes both the 45th anniversary of the Pony coupe and the 45-degree angles prominent on the sides of the concept. At the time, Hyundai called the design language "sensuous sportiness" and described the front and rear lights as carrying a "kinetic cube" theme.

The Ioniq 5 was developed under the project code NE as the first vehicle based on the E-GMP platform. The dedicated electric vehicle platform enables a fully flat interior floor with a 3-meter long wheelbase. The flat floor allows Hyundai engineers to develop a sliding front central console, marketed as Universal Island, which slides back by 140 mm (5.5 in). The vehicle has a cargo capacity of about 527–531 L (18.6–18.8 cu ft) behind the rear seats, depending on market and measurement method, and approximately 1,587–1,600 L (56.0–56.5 cu ft) with the second row seats folded. Greater rear legroom space was achieved by front seats approximately 30 per cent shorter than typical.

The instrument panel of the Ioniq 5 uses two 12-inch screens: an instrument cluster display and the touchscreen infotainment system, both under a single glass screen. It is equipped with an optional head-up display with augmented reality support. Numerous interior parts are made from recycled materials, including PET bottles. The Ioniq 5 can be optioned with a single large glass panel roof without any support beams.

The Ioniq 5 also features a front boot (alternatively called a frunk), with a 57 L (2.01 cu ft) capacity for the RWD version (except North America), while the AWD model and all North American versions have a 24 L (0.848 cu ft) capacity, due to the extra mechanical components underneath to support the front electric motor. It has the ability to charge electrical equipment through the built-in V2L (Vehicle to Load) function. It can supply up to 3.6 kW of power from the port mounted under the rear seats (except Australia) and from another port installed outside. The exterior port is able to supply power even if the vehicle is turned off.

In some markets, the Ioniq 5 is offered with an optional Digital Side Mirror (DSM) which replaces the conventional side mirrors with cameras and OLED screens. The feature has not been offered in the United States, where camera-based systems have not yet been permitted to replace exterior side mirrors on production passenger vehicles.

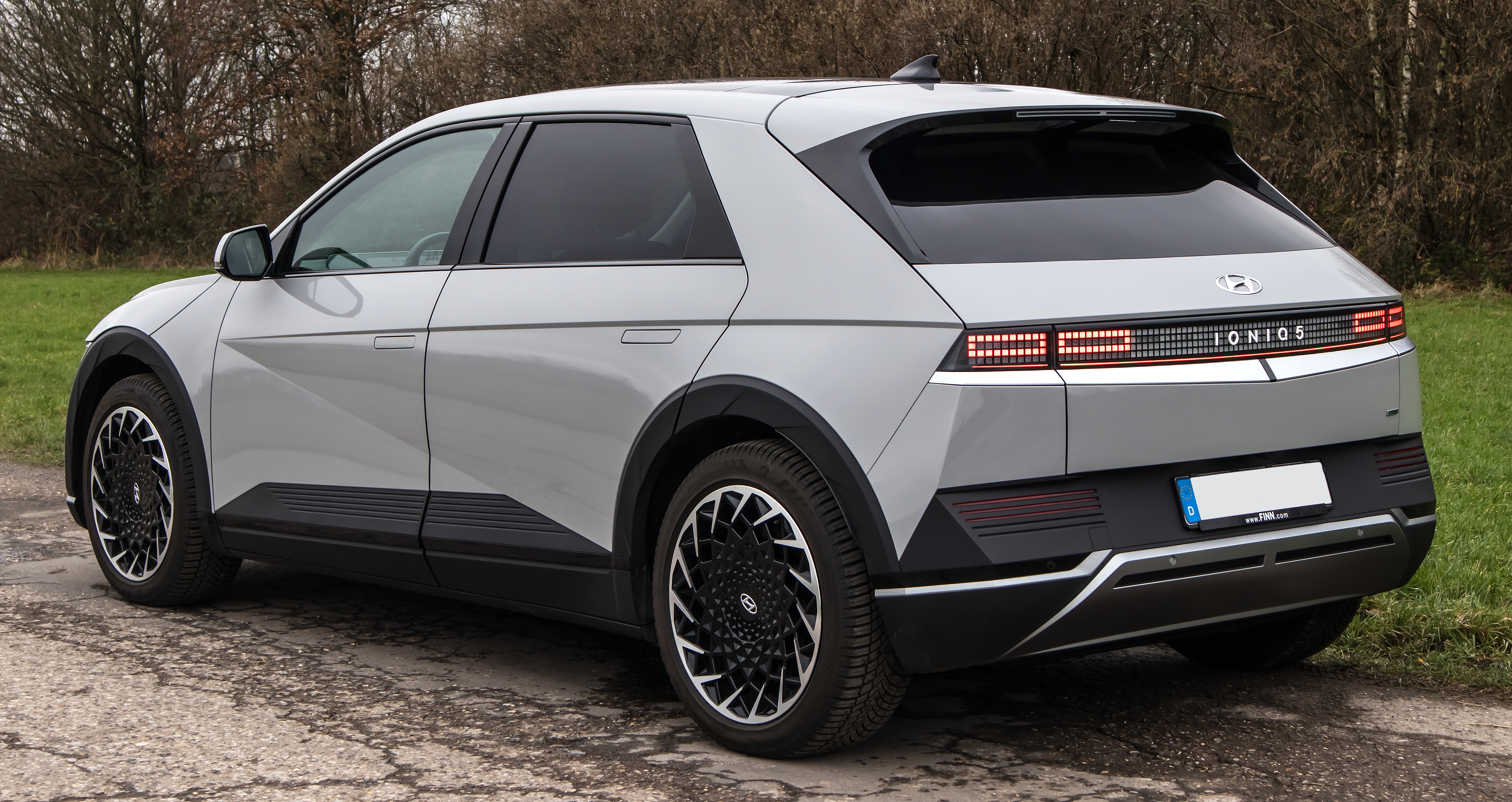
Rear view

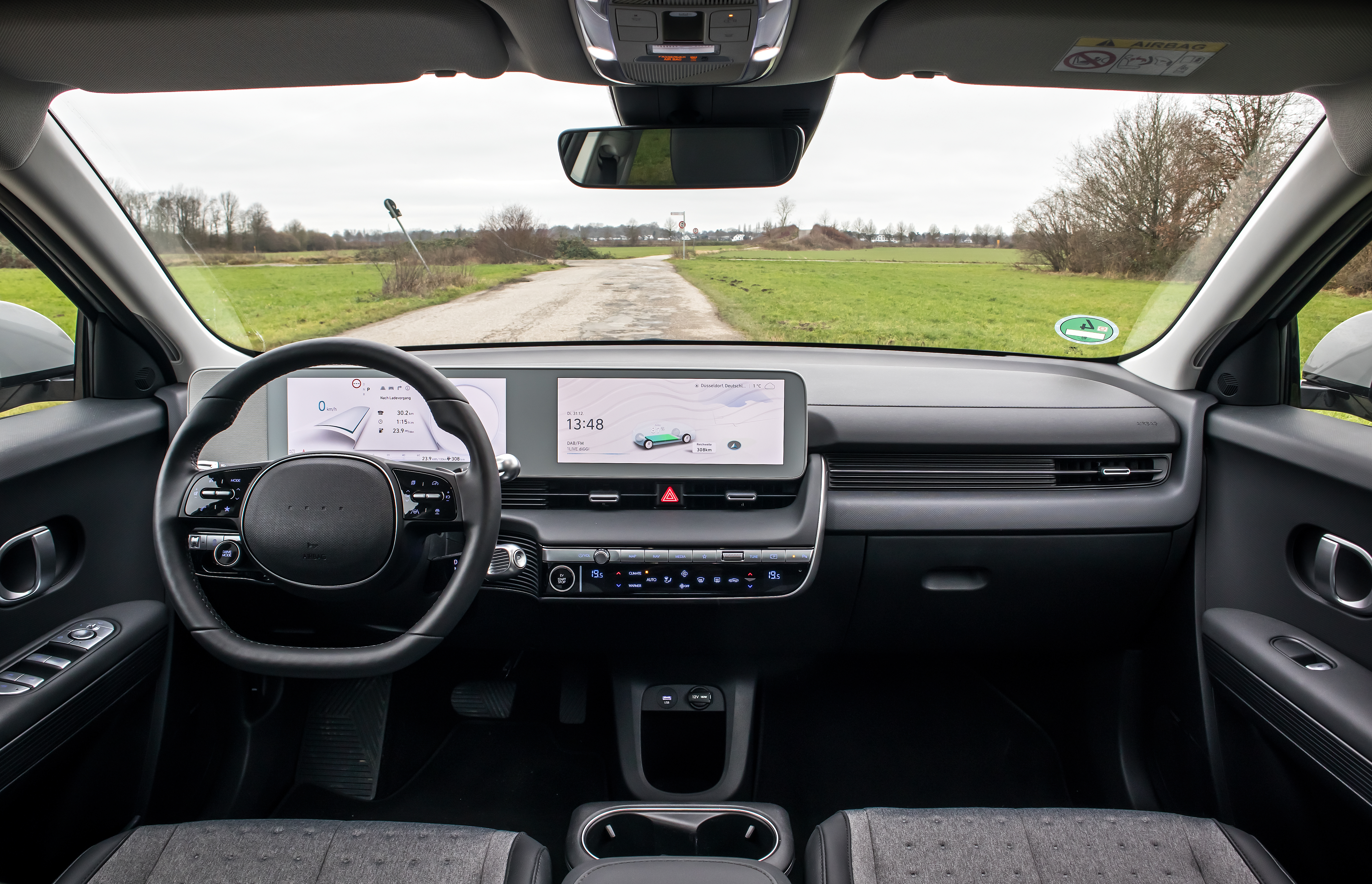
Interior

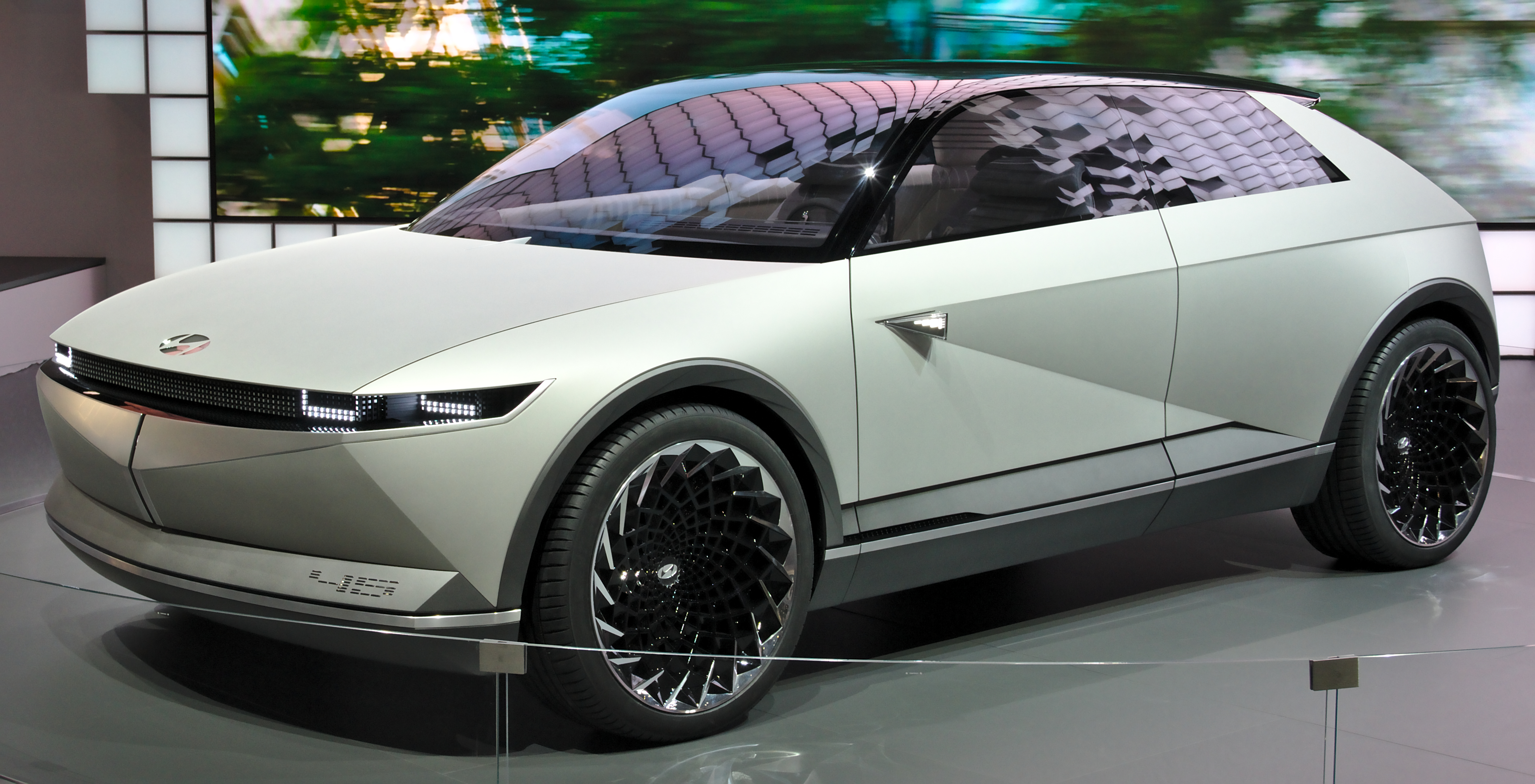
Hyundai 45 EV Concept (front)

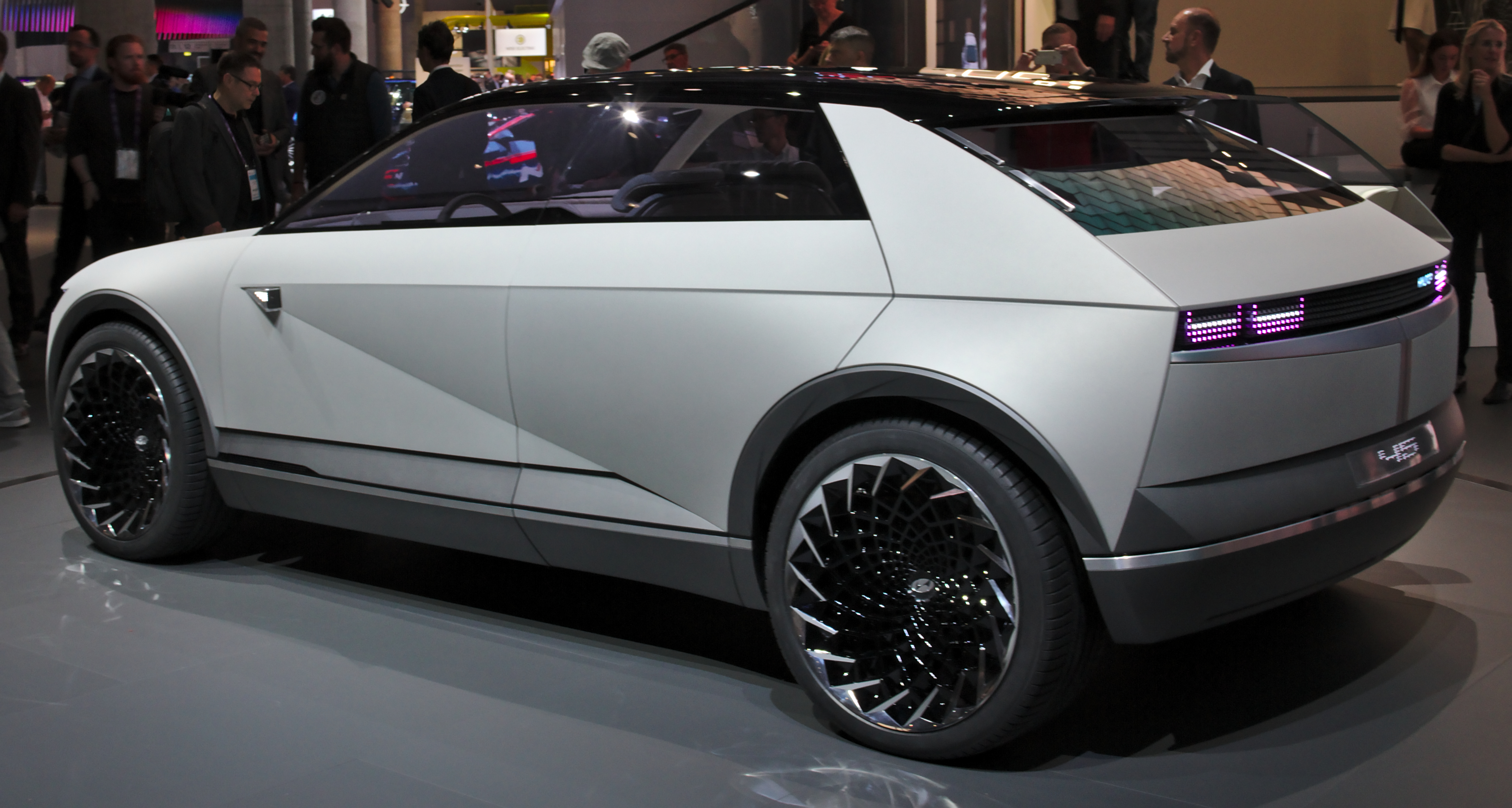
Hyundai 45 EV Concept (rear)

== 2024 facelift ==
The facelifted Ioniq 5 was revealed on March 3, 2024. Changes include the addition of a rear hatch windscreen wiper, and an updated infotainment system. A larger battery pack (84 kWh, up from 77.4 kWh) and minor improvements to power efficiency and aerodynamics were also introduced. An N-Line variant was added to the improved Ioniq 5.

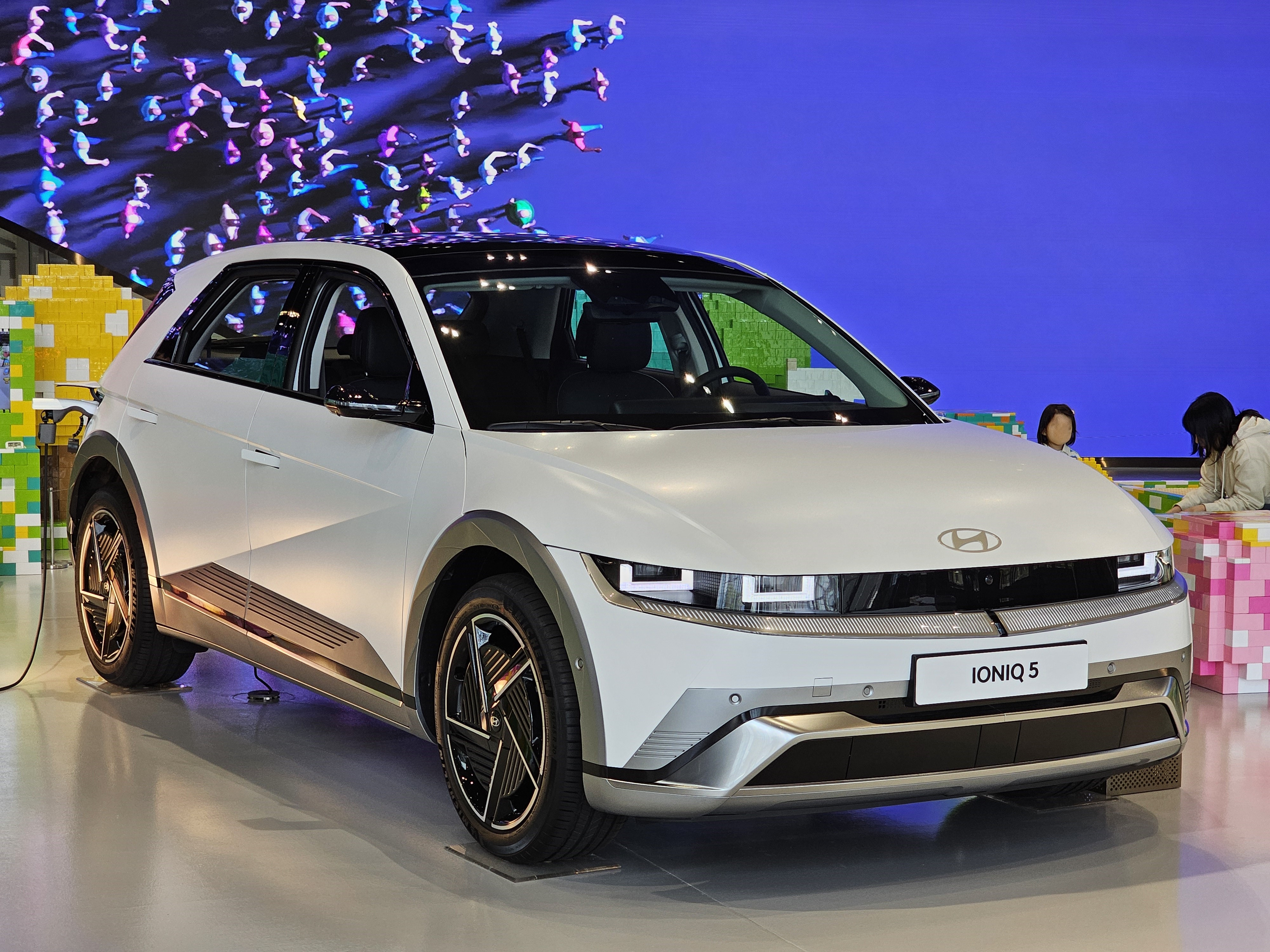
Facelift Ioniq 5 Prestige (front)

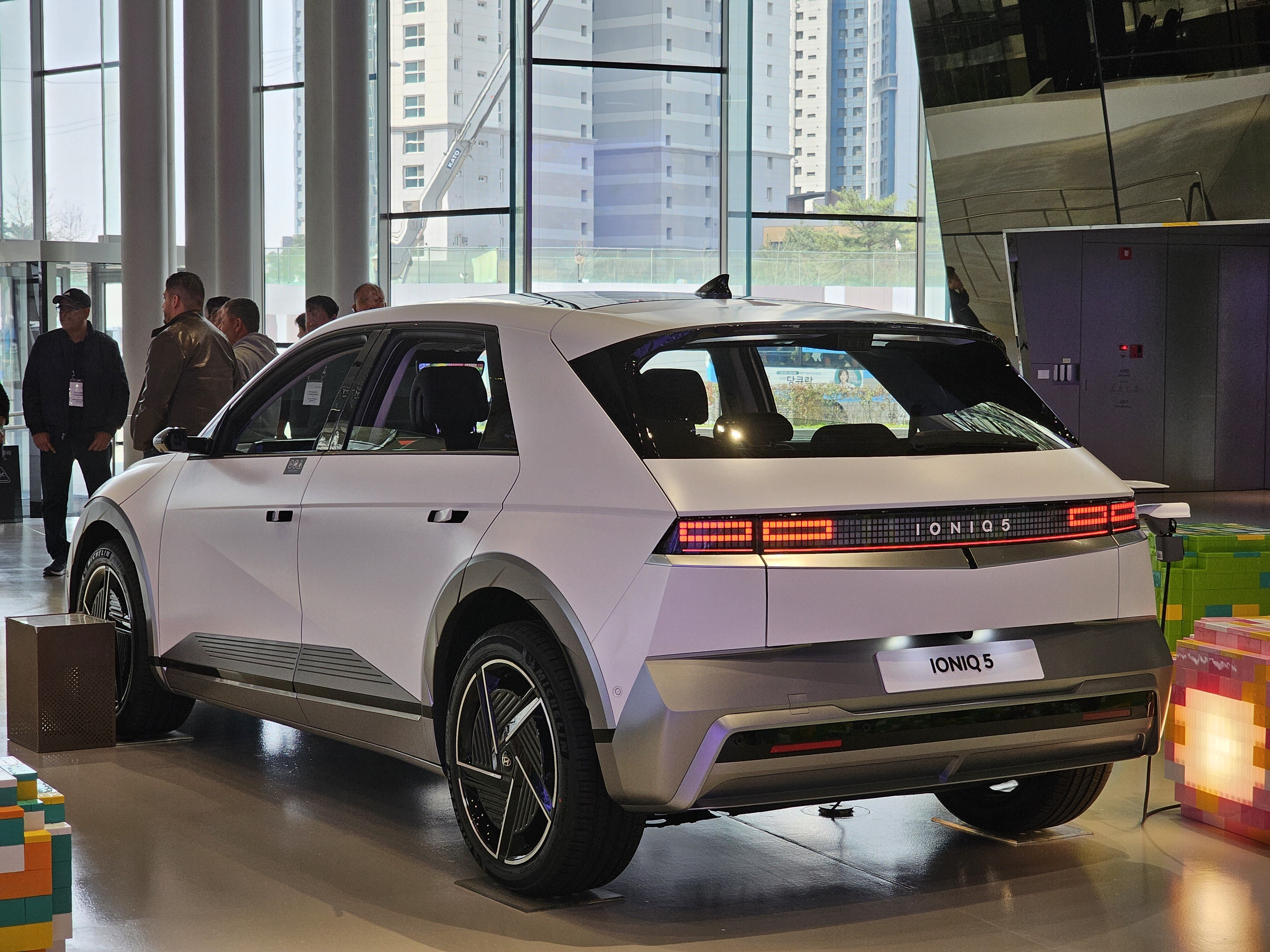
Facelift Ioniq 5 Prestige (rear)

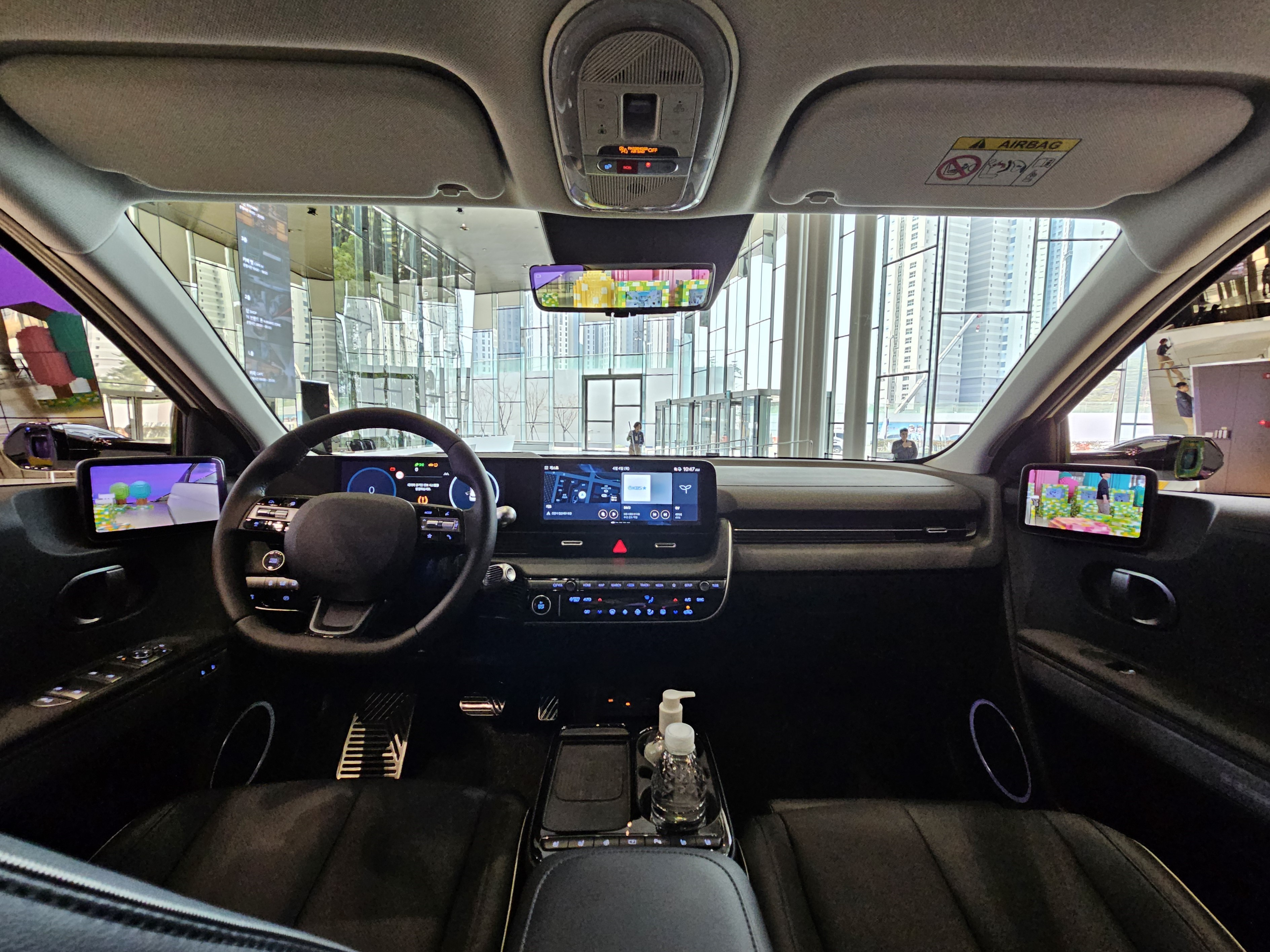
Facelift Ioniq 5 Prestige (interior)

=== N-Line ===
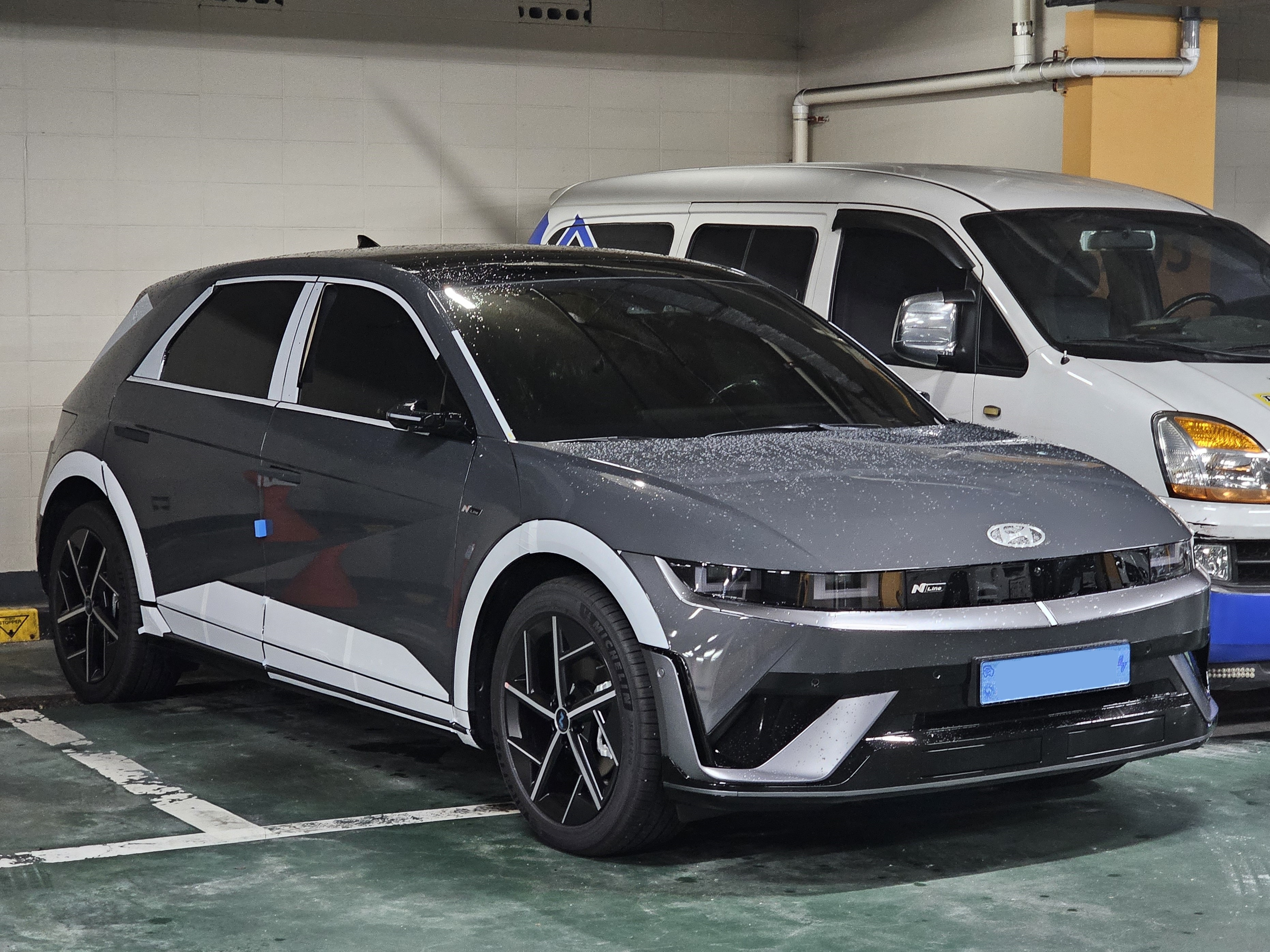
Facelift Ioniq 5 N Line (front)

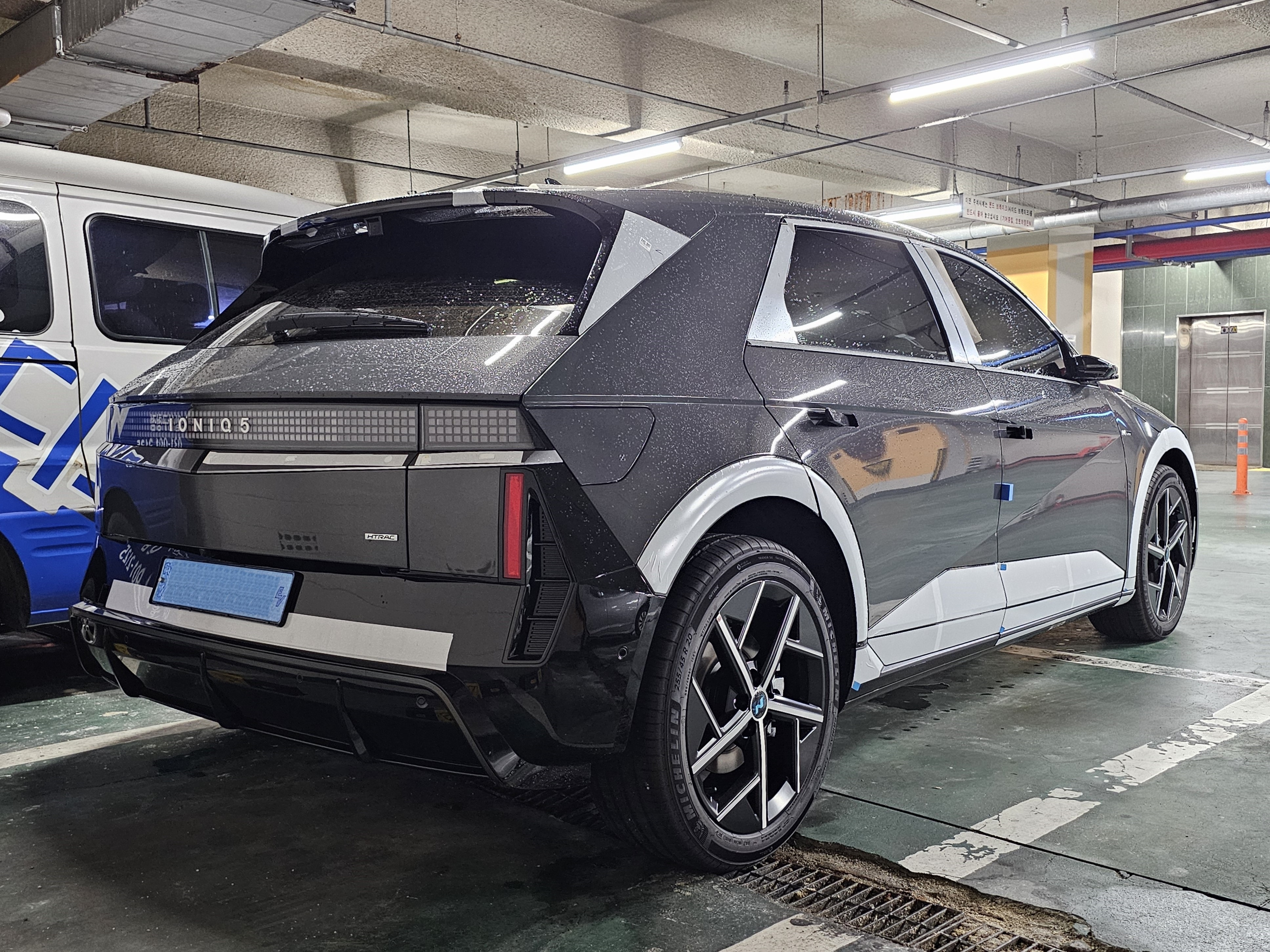
Facelift Ioniq 5 N Line (rear)

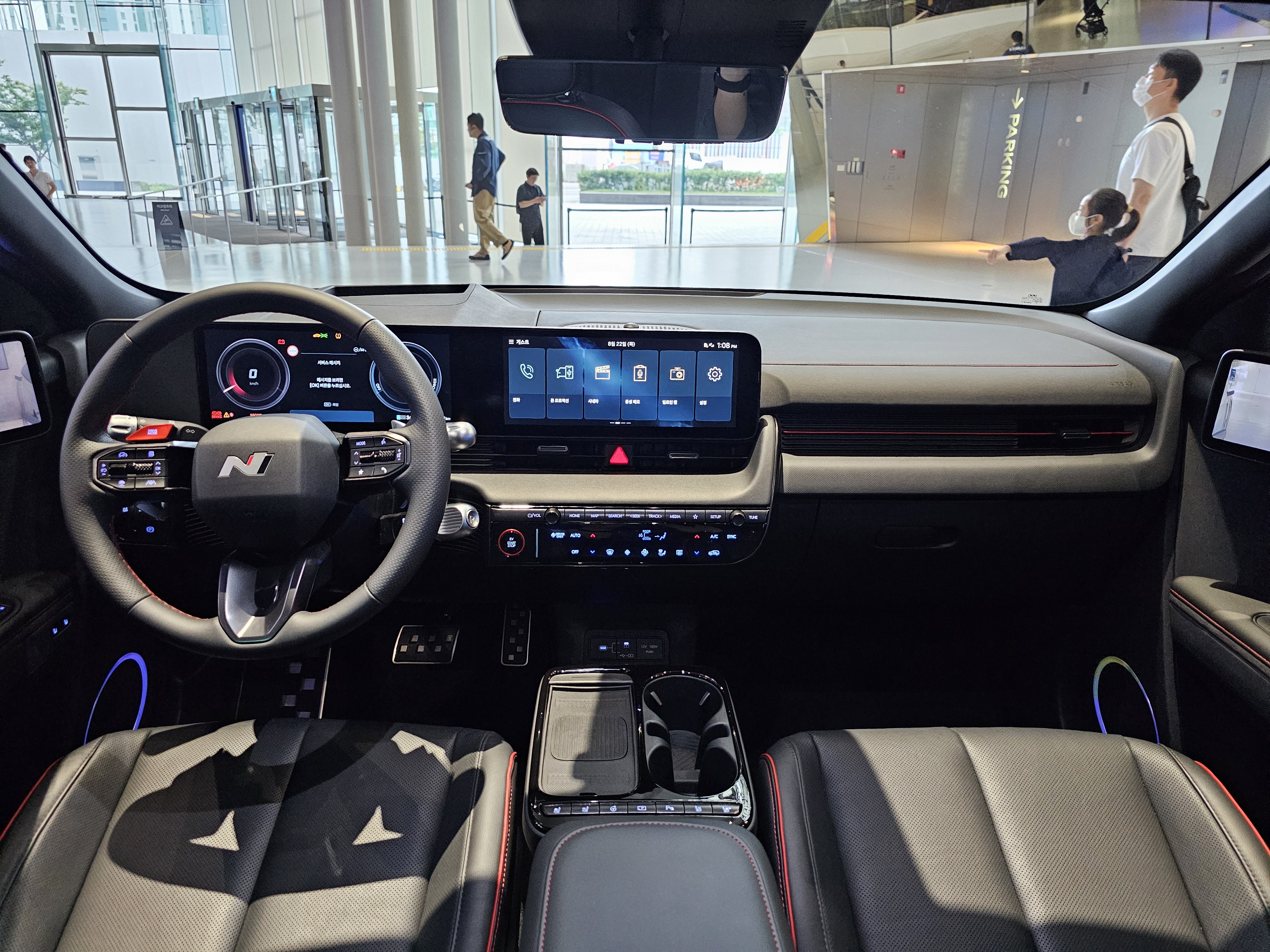
Facelift Ioniq 5 N Line (interior)

=== XRT ===
The XRT is an off-road-oriented trim introduced for the 2025 model year and revealed on September 3, 2024. Built at Hyundai Motor Group Metaplant America (HMGMA) in Georgia for the North American market, it is offered solely with a dual-motor all-wheel-drive powertrain producing 320 hp (239 kW) and 446 lb-ft (605 N⋅m), paired with the 84 kWh battery and a native North American Charging Standard (NACS) port. It adds a 23 mm (0.9 in) suspension lift for 7.0 in (178 mm) of ground clearance, 18-inch wheels with 235/60R18 all-terrain tyres, revised front and rear fascias that improve the approach angle to 19.8° and departure angle to 30.0°, front recovery hooks, and Snow, Sand and Mud terrain modes. It has an EPA-estimated range of 259 miles (417 km).

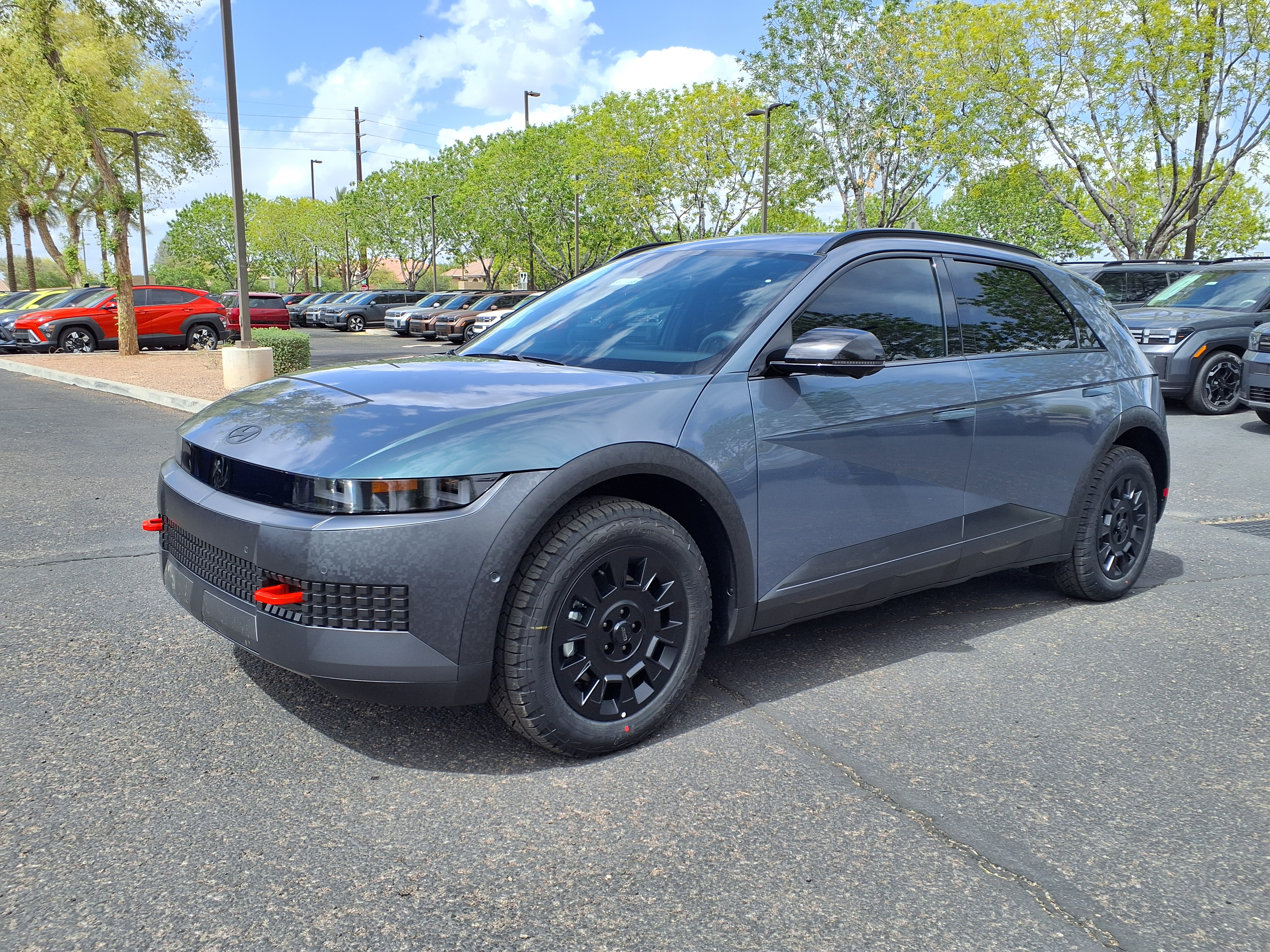
Ioniq 5 XRT

== Ioniq 5 N ==
The Ioniq 5 N was introduced on 14 July 2023 during the 2023 Goodwood Festival of Speed. The variant is the top-of-the-line model, marketed under the Hyundai N performance sub-brand.

The exterior changes include a revised front end with larger air intakes, with additional air curtains and air flaps for improved cooling. The rear portion gained a rear wiper, wing-type spoiler integrated with a triangular third brake light, and a rear diffuser. With extended wheel arches and wider track, the Ioniq 5 N is 50 mm (2.0 in) wider than the standard model and also 20 mm (0.8 in) lower. The larger front motor and front external speaker mean the Ioniq 5 N loses the front boot / trunk present in other Ioniq models.

The body in white structure of the Ioniq 5 N gains 42 additional welding points and 2.1 m (83 in) of additional adhesives for improved rigidity. The motor and battery mountings were also reinforced, while the subframes were enhanced for lateral rigidity. Its power steering has a higher ratio and improved torque feedback.

The vehicle is equipped with two electric motors, providing a total of 448 kW (609 PS; 601 hp) and 740 N⋅m (75.5 kg⋅m; 546 lb⋅ft) of torque. Hyundai equipped the Ioniq 5 N with an N Grin Boost mode, allowing a maximum output of 478 kW (650 PS; 641 hp) and 770 N⋅m (78.5 kg⋅m; 568 lb⋅ft) of torque being released for 10 seconds. Hyundai claimed a 0–100 km/h (0–62 mph) acceleration figure of 3.5 seconds, or 3.4 seconds with launch control or with N Grin Boost mode activated. The lithium-ion battery for this variant is also extended to 84 kWh.

Several aspects were conceived to simulate an internal combustion vehicle. An N e-shift function emulates the feel of an 8-speed dual-clutch automatic transmission, by controlling motor torque to simulate the jolt between shifts. A similar system is utilised to simulate a clutch kick to initiate sliding when in N Drift Optimiser Pro mode. A system called N Active Sound+ uses eight interior and two exterior speakers to play three different sound themes based on throttle position, such as a 2.0-liter turbocharged petrol engine from other Hyundai N cars, futuristic EV themes and twin-engine fighter jet sounds.

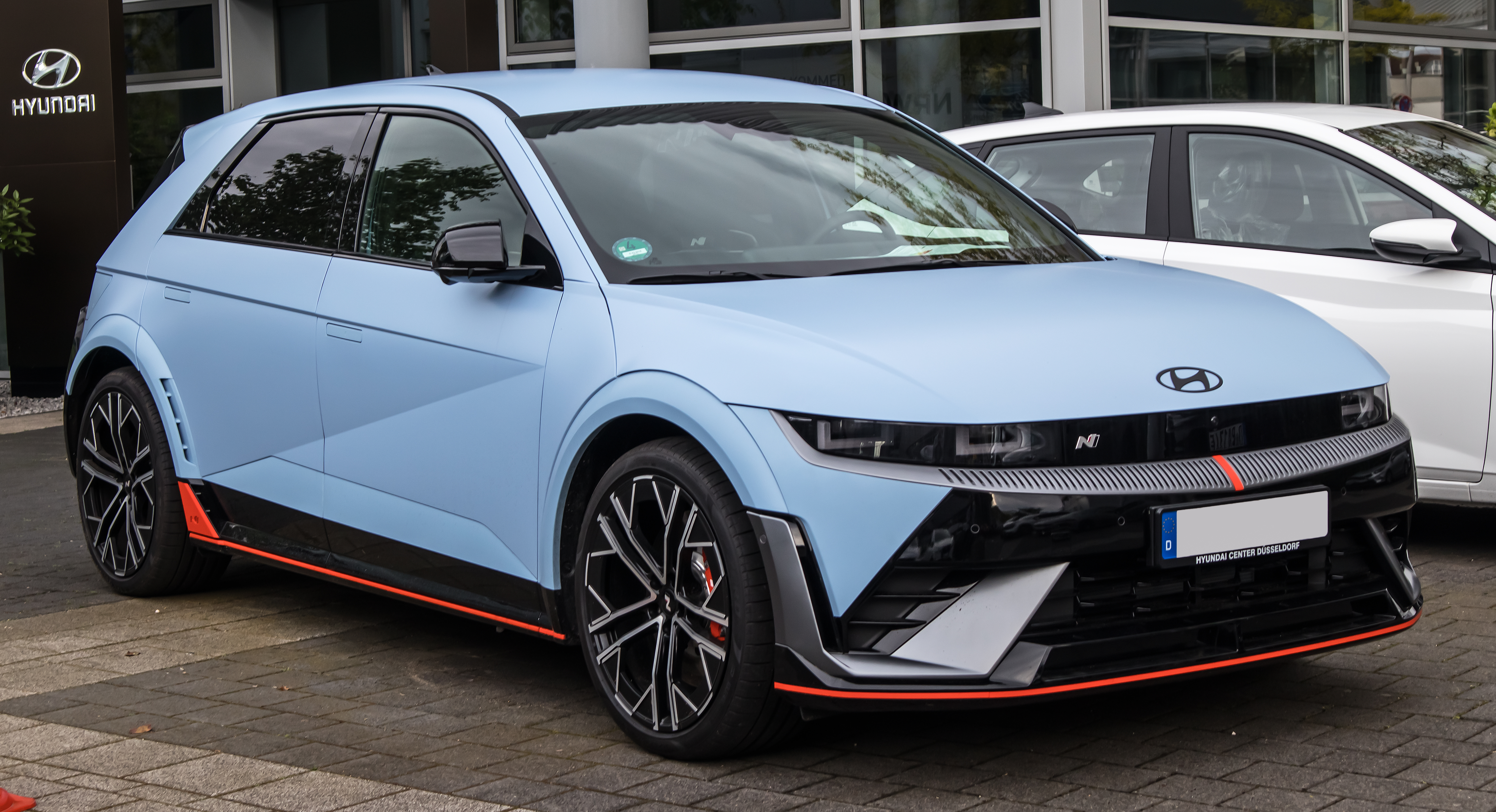
Ioniq 5 N

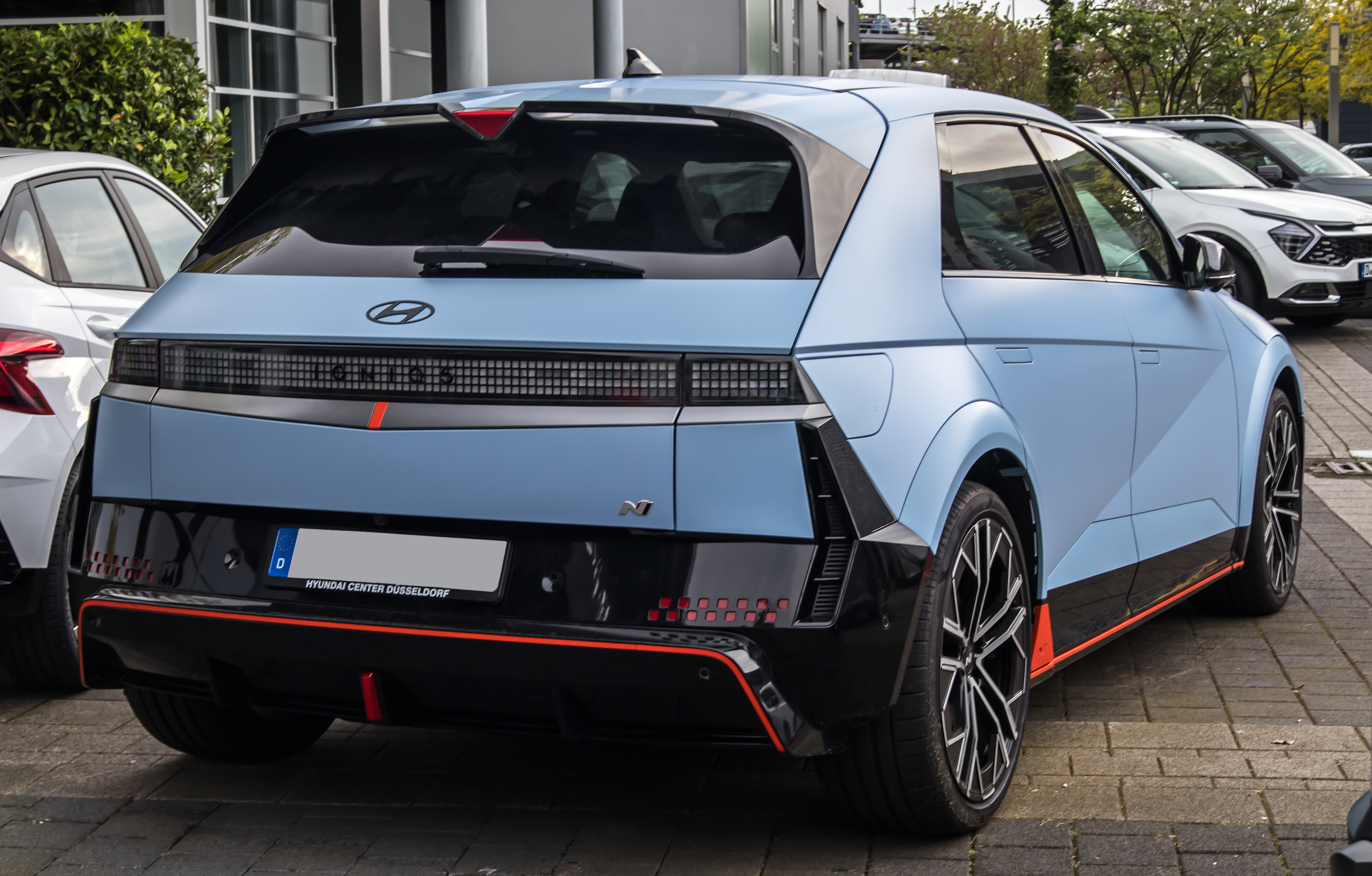
Rear view

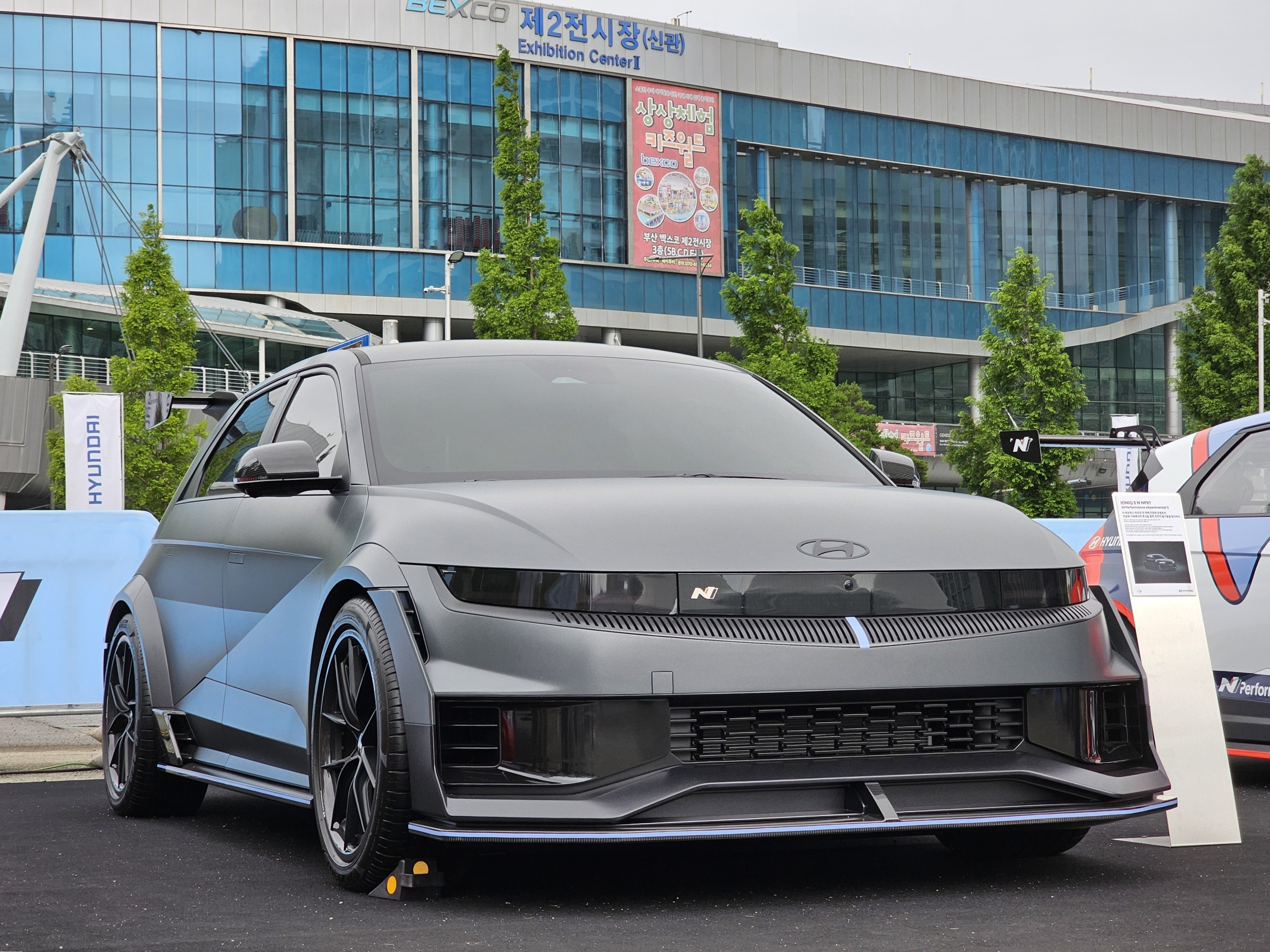
Ioniq 5 N NPX1 Concept

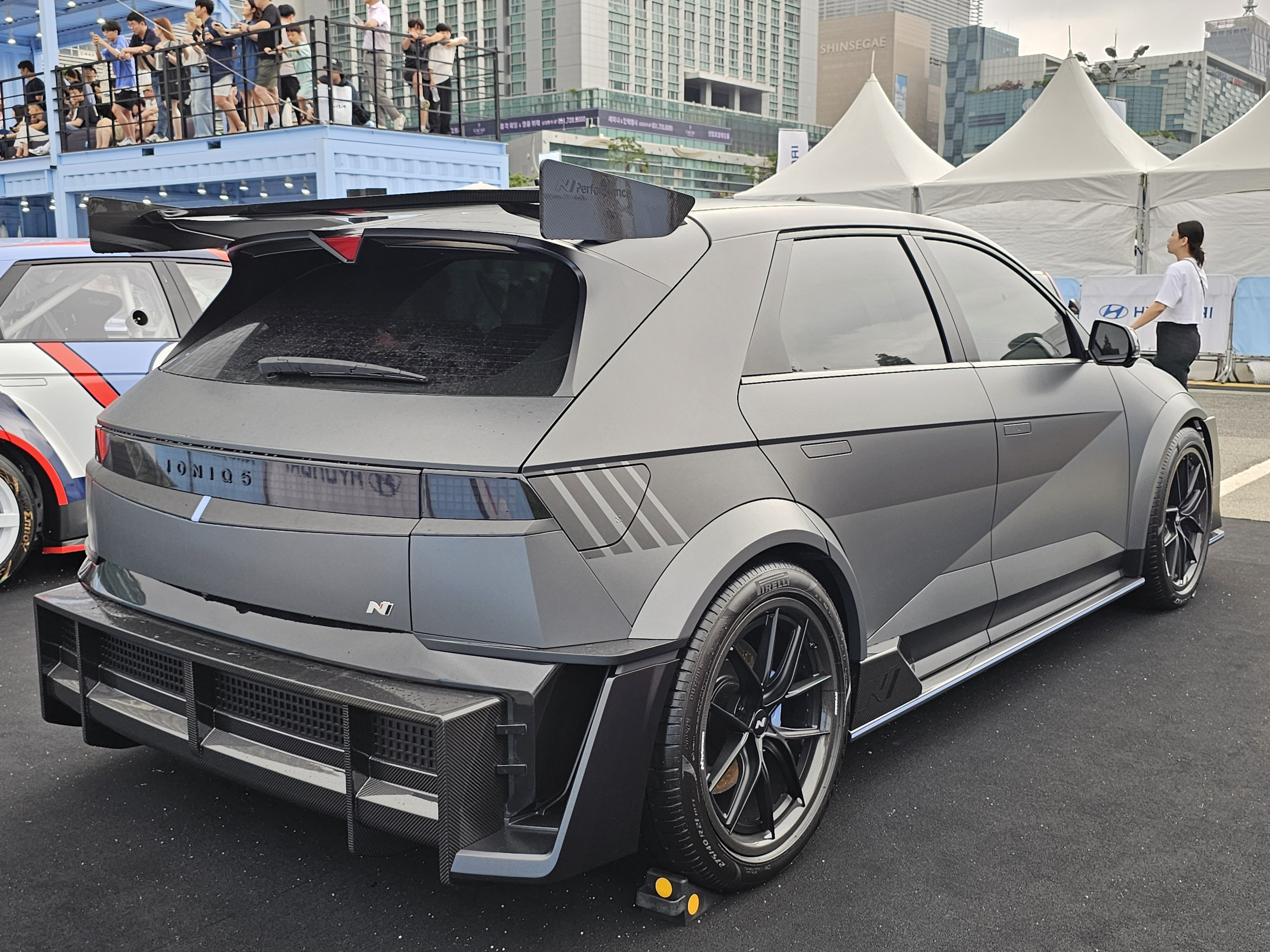
Rear view

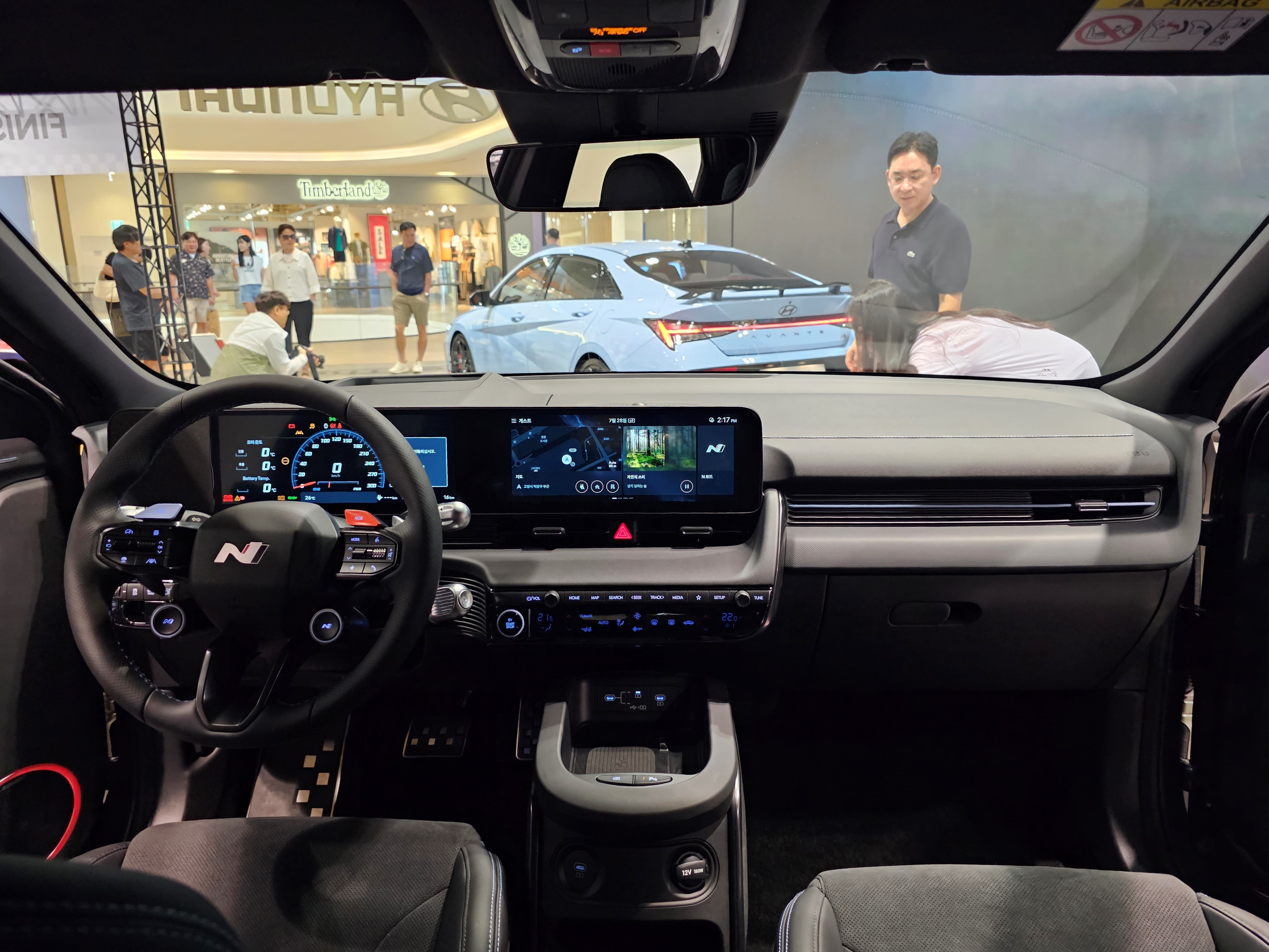
Interior

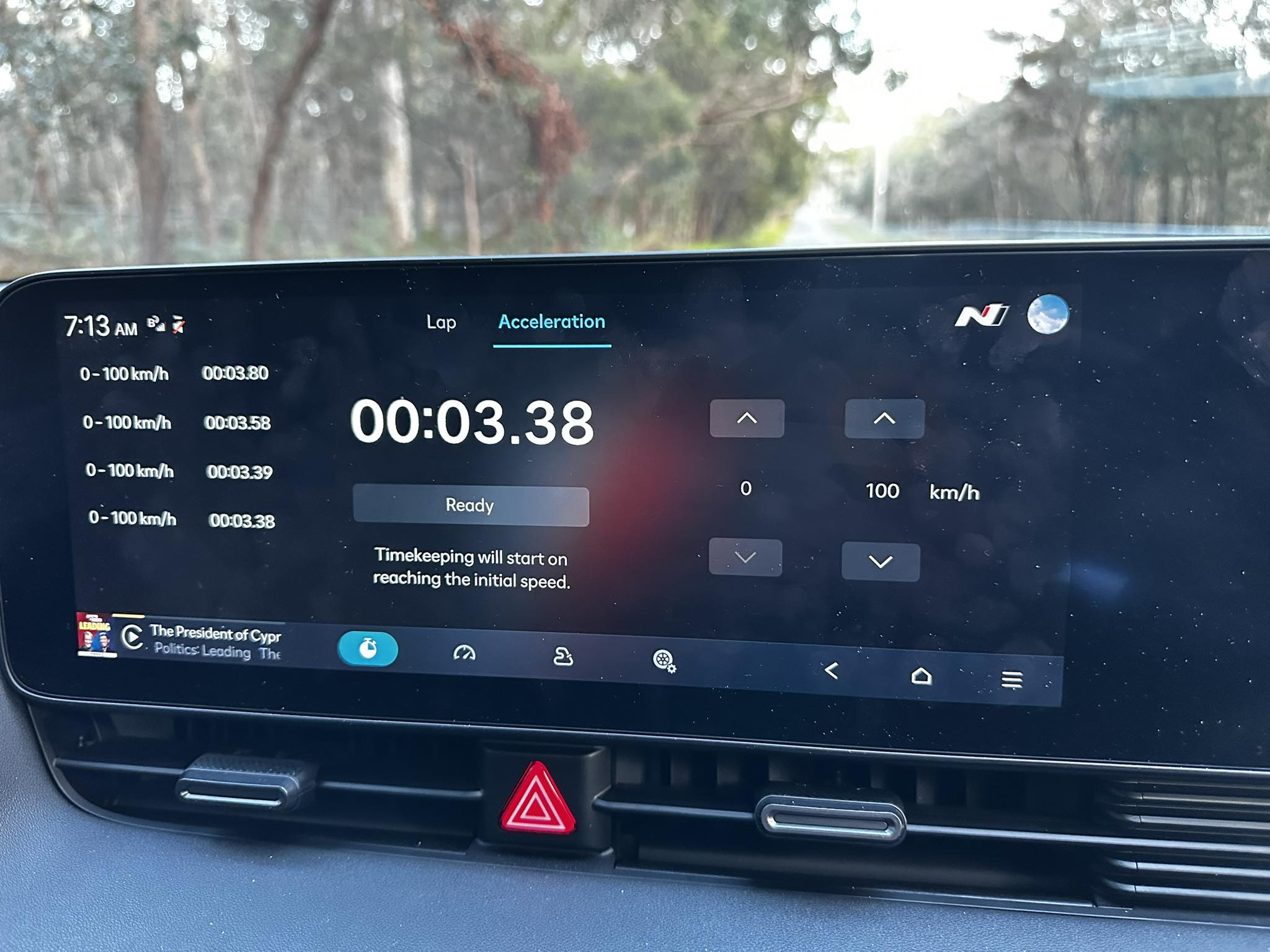
Acceleration

The N Line is a sport-styled variant added to the facelifted Ioniq 5, positioned between the standard model and the high-performance Ioniq 5 N. Exterior features include N Line-specific front and rear bumpers with light-coloured flaps inspired by the Ioniq 5 N, tweaked side skirts and 20-inch alloy wheels, while the interior adds a unique steering wheel, sport seats, metal pedals, a black headliner, red stitching and N Line badging. It first became available in Korea from March 2024, before being rolled out gradually to other markets.

== Ioniq 5 eN1 Cup ==
During the Hyundai N festival in December 2023, Hyundai revealed concept images of the Ioniq 5 eN1 Cup car, a racing variant of the Ioniq 5 N, with the goal of finishing the development in February 2024. The car features an aerodynamic bodykit, including air intakes, a rear diffuser, and a rear wing. It also features a stiffer suspension setup, lowering the ride height by 2.8 inches (71.1 mm). The car is also said to be about 250 kg (550 lb) lighter than its road going counterpart. Each racing team will have access to a special version of the Sound+ system, and drivers will be able to use N Grin Boost for extra power during overtakes, and N e-shift to add virtual gears. The Ioniq 5 eN1 Cup will start racing in late April 2024 in its own one-make EV series during the Hyundai N Festival in Korea.

During the Hyundai N Festival in December 2023, Hyundai revealed concept images of the Ioniq 5 eN1 Cup car, a racing variant of the Ioniq 5 N.[31] The concept was shown with an aerodynamic bodykit, including air intakes, a rear diffuser and a rear wing, and a stiffer suspension setup lowering the ride height by 2.8 inches (71.1 mm). The eN1 Cup car was unveiled over the weekend of 30 March 2024 at an official practice round ahead of the 2024 Hyundai N Festival season. The eN1 Cup car uses an adjustable two-way-damper suspension and sits lower than the road model; with weight-saving measures such as a fibreglass-reinforced plastic hood and polycarbonate windows, it weighs about 1,970 kg (4,343 lb), roughly 270 kg (600 lb) lighter than the road car, and shares the road car's dual-motor all-wheel-drive powertrain rated at a peak of 641 hp. Each racing team can use a special version of the car's sound system, and drivers retain N Grin Boost and N e-Shift. The car competes in a dedicated eN1 class, Korea's first electric one-make race, introduced for the 2024 Hyundai N Festival season.

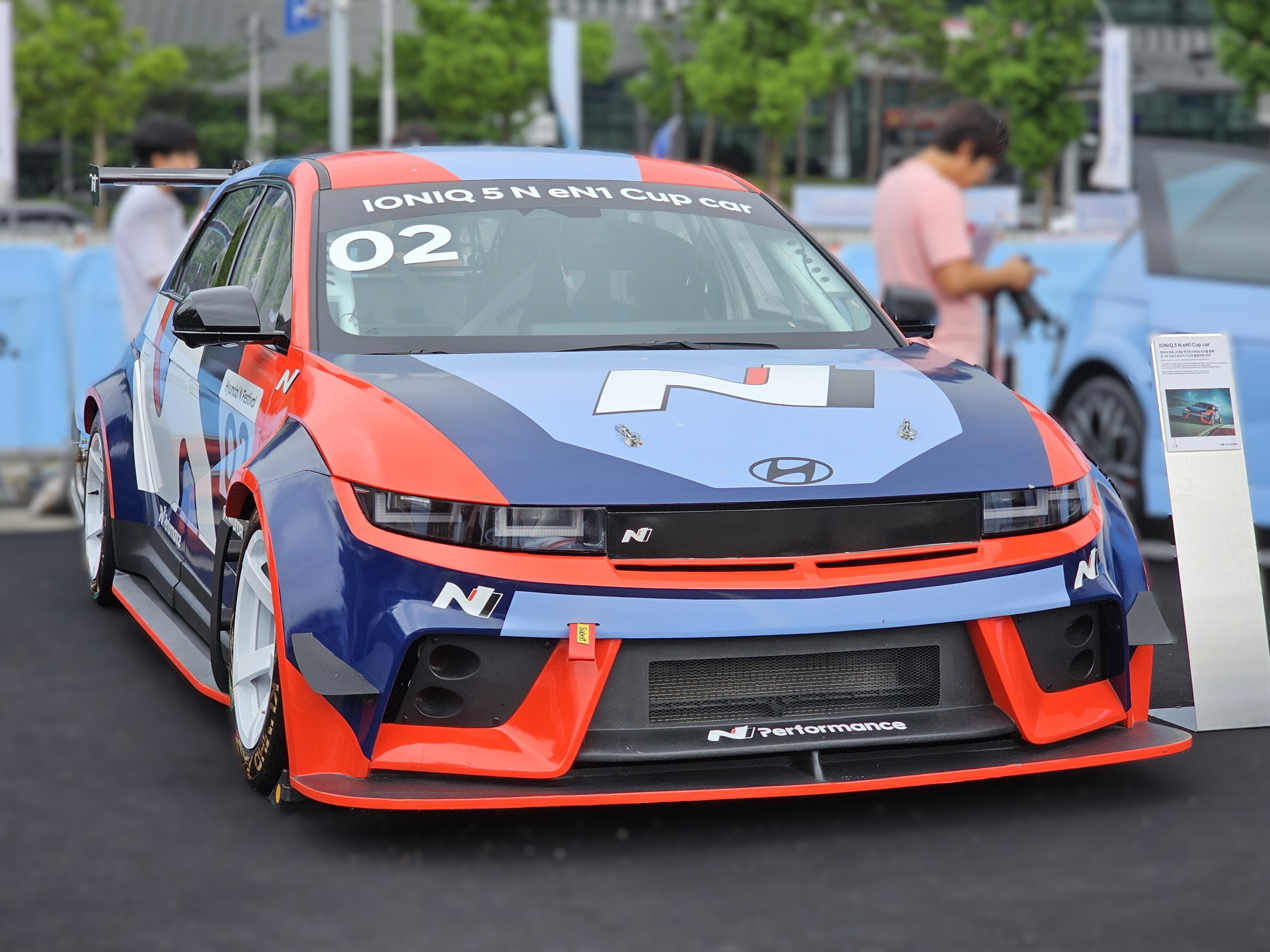
Hyundai Ioniq 5 N eN1 Cup car

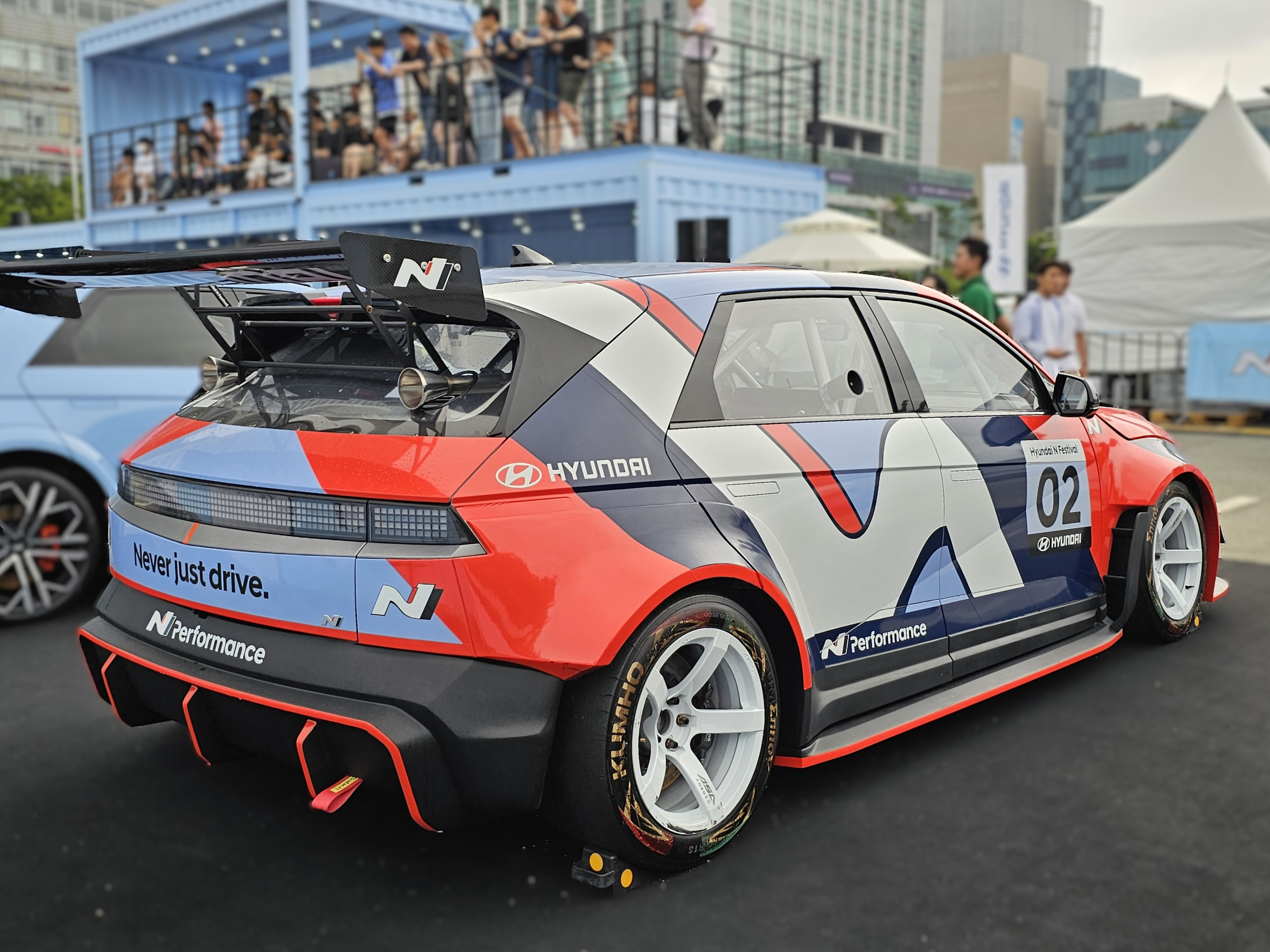
Rear view

== Powertrain ==
From vehicle launch to mid-2022, the Long Range Ioniq 5 in Europe and certain other markets initially had a 72.6 kWh battery pack, which was later upgraded to 77.4 kWh, while a 58 kWh battery pack was offered for the Standard Range model. The standard Ioniq 5 has a top speed of 185 km/h (115 mph), while the high-performance Ioniq 5 N has a top speed of 260 km/h (162 mph).

Earlier North American models were available with the 58 kWh Standard Range or 77.4 kWh Long Range batteries. For the 2025 model year, U.S.-market Ioniq 5 models, excluding the Ioniq 5 N, moved to Hyundai Motor Group Metaplant America (HMGMA) production and adopted a larger 63 kWh Standard Range battery with an EPA-estimated range of 245 mi (394 km) and an 84 kWh Long Range battery with an EPA-estimated range of up to 318 mi (512 km) in rear-wheel-drive form, along with a native North American Charging Standard (NACS) port. In Canada, the 2025 Ioniq 5 XRT was produced at HMGMA and equipped with a native NACS port, while the other variants retained a CCS port and were eligible for a CCS-to-NACS adapter.

The 800 V inverter is sourced from Vitesco Technologies, a subsidiary of the Continental group. A five minutes charge will add 100 km (62 mi) to its range by WLTP standards.

Specifications
Battery	Years	Layout	Power	Torque	0–100 km/h (62 mph)	Range (claimed)	Peak DC charge rate
Ioniq 5
58 kWh (Standard Range)	2021–2024	RWD	125 kW (170 PS; 168 hp)	350 N⋅m (258 lb⋅ft)	8.5 s	354 km (220 mi) (EPA); 384 km (239 mi) (WLTP); 336 km (209 mi) (Korea)	175 kW
58 kWh (Standard Range)	2021–2024	AWD	173 kW (235 PS; 232 hp)	605 N⋅m (446 lb⋅ft)	6.1 s	360 km (224 mi) (WLTP); 319 km (198 mi) (Korea)	175 kW
72.6 kWh (Long Range)	2021–2024	RWD	160 kW (218 PS; 215 hp)	350 N⋅m (258 lb⋅ft)	7.4 s	451–481 km (280–299 mi) (WLTP); 401–429 km (249–267 mi) (Korea)	
72.6 kWh (Long Range)	2021–2024	AWD	225 kW (306 PS; 302 hp)	605 N⋅m (446 lb⋅ft)	5.2 s	430–460 km (267–286 mi) (WLTP); 370–390 km (230–242 mi) (Korea)	
77.4 kWh (Extra Long Range)	2021–2024	RWD	168 kW (228 PS; 225 hp)	350 N⋅m (258 lb⋅ft)	7.3 s	488 km (303 mi) (EPA)	233 kW
77.4 kWh (Extra Long Range)	2021–2024	AWD	239 kW (325 PS; 321 hp)	605 N⋅m (446 lb⋅ft)	5.1 s	412–418 km (256–260 mi) (EPA)	233 kW
Ioniq 5 facelift
63 kWh (Standard Range)	2024–present					394 km (245 mi) (EPA)	
84 kWh	2024–present	RWD	168 kW (228 PS; 225 hp)	350 N⋅m (258 lb⋅ft)	7.3 s	453–485 km (281–301 mi) (Korea); 512 km (318 mi) (EPA)	238 kW
84 kWh	2024–present	AWD	239 kW (325 PS; 321 hp)	605 N⋅m (446 lb⋅ft)	5.1 s	411–451 km (255–280 mi) (Korea); 417–467 km (259–290 mi) (EPA)	238 kW
Ioniq 5 N
84 kWh	2023–present	AWD	478 kW (650 PS; 641 hp)	770 N⋅m (568 lb⋅ft)	3.4 s	448 km (278 mi) (WLTP); 351 km (218 mi) (Korea); 356 km (221 mi) (EPA)	238 kW

== Markets ==
=== Asia ===
==== Brunei ====
The Ioniq 5 N has been launched in Brunei on 8 August 2025.

==== India ====
The Ioniq 5 was introduced in India in January 2023 at the Auto Expo. It is Hyundai's second electric offering for India after the Kona Electric, which was available in the country since 2019. Assembled in the country, the Indian model is solely powered by a 72.6 kWh battery with 160 kW (218 PS; 215 hp) and rear-wheel drive.

==== Indonesia ====
Following multiple introductions since 26 October 2021, the Indonesian market Ioniq 5 was revealed on 31 March 2022 during the 29th Indonesia International Motor Show, with pre-orders began on 1 April 2022. It went on sale on 22 April 2022. Initial variants for the Ioniq 5 were the Prime and Signature, with each type have the option between the Standard Range (58 kWh) and Long Range (72.6 kWh) battery packs.

It is locally assembled at the Hyundai Motor Manufacturing Indonesia (HMMI) plant in Cikarang, Bekasi, West Java, with its production was inaugurated by the 7th President of Indonesia, Joko Widodo on 16 March 2022. It is the first mass-produced battery electric vehicle to be built in Indonesia. Annual production target of the Ioniq 5 in the country is set up to 1,500 units per year. Since April 2023, Hyundai increased the production rate from around 137 units to 1,000 units per month due to extremely high demand.

On 13 September 2023, the Ioniq 5 received an update to include BlueLink telematics system as standard on all variants.

A limited edition variant called the Batik was unveiled in February 2024 at the 31st Indonesia International Motor Show. Hence by its name, the variant sported several accents inspired by the traditional Indonesian batik culture, particularly the Kawung motif, featured on both of its exterior and interior. Only 60 units were made.

The Ioniq 5 N went on sale in July 2024 at the 31st Gaikindo Indonesia International Auto Show, coinciding with the introduction of the Hyundai N performance sub-brand to the Indonesian market. It is locally assembled alongside the regular Ioniq 5, making it the first performance electric vehicle to be built in Indonesia.

==== Japan ====
The Ioniq 5 was the first vehicle sold by Hyundai after it set pre-orders in May 2022 with deliveries made in July 2022 under Hyundai's newly established subsidiary in Japan, Hyundai Mobility Japan.

On 22 May 2024, official social media accounts of Hyundai Japan and Ghost in the Shell announced a collaboration to promote the Ioniq 5 N. The Shibuya Tsutaya store hosted the Ioniq 5 N from 3 to 22 June.

==== Malaysia ====
The Ioniq 5 was released in Malaysia on 9 March 2022, with three trim levels: Lite, Plus and Max. Two powertrain options are available: Standard Range (RWD) and Long Range (AWD), the latter powertrain comes standard on the top trim.

The Ioniq 5 N was launched in Malaysia on 11 June 2026, as part of the introduction of the Hyundai N performance sub-brand to the Malaysian market.

==== Philippines ====
The Ioniq 5 was released in the Philippines in February 2023, in a sole GLS trim, with two powertrain options: Standard Range and Long Range, both use a RWD (single motor) setup.

The Ioniq 5 N was launched in the Philippines on 4 April 2024 as a fully imported model, alongside the Elantra N, as part of the introduction of the Hyundai N performance sub-brand to the Philippines market.

The facelifted Ioniq 5 debuted in the Philippines on 23 July 2025, alongside the Palisade with the new GL trim using the RWD Standard Range (single motor) powertrain.

==== Singapore ====
The Ioniq 5 was released in Singapore in January 2023, in three trim levels: Exclusive, Prestige, and Inspiration, with two powertrain options: Standard Range and Extra Long Range, with the top trim has AWD (dual motor) setup as standard. Assembled in the country at the Hyundai Motor Group Innovation Centre facility, it is the first vehicle assembled in Singapore in more than 40 years. The plant will initially import the vehicle's fully painted body shell from the Indonesian plant, while other parts are imported from South Korea. The first 100 units are designated as the "First 100" limited edition, with "First 100" badging, "First 100" debossing on the seats, and commemorative number plates.

==== Taiwan ====
The Ioniq 5 was launched in Taiwan on 2 March 2022, with three variants: EV400 (58 kWh), EV500 (72.6 kWh) and EV500 Performance (72.6 kWh AWD). In August 2022, the 2023 model year update saw the introduction of the flagship EV600 and EV600 Performance variants, using the 77.4 kWh battery pack. The entry-level EV400 variant was discontinued in January 2024 and was later reintroduced in February 2024, with adjustments to equipment options and a few interior features became optional extras.

The Ioniq 5 N was launched in Taiwan on 5 March 2024.

==== Thailand ====
The Ioniq 5 was introduced in Thailand on 29 November 2023 at Thailand International Motor Expo 2023 by Hyundai's newly established subsidiary in Thailand, Hyundai Mobility Thailand. Imported from South Korea, with three trim levels offered are Premium, Exclusive and First Edition, with two powertrain options: Standard Range and Long Range, both use a RWD (single motor) setup. The N Line Long Range variant was added on 20 February 2025.

The Ioniq 5 N was launched in Thailand on 26 September 2024.

In June 2026, the Ioniq 5 became locally assembled at Hyundai Mobility Manufacturing Thailand plant in Samut Prakarn only for the N Line Long Range variant.

==== Vietnam ====
The Ioniq 5 was released in Vietnam on 31 July 2023. Locally assembled in Vietnam, it was available in Exclusive and Prestige trim levels, with two powertrain options: Standard Range and Long Range, both use a RWD (single motor) setup.

=== Europe ===
Initial models of the Ioniq 5 in Europe was offered with a choice of two battery packs (58 kWh and 72.6 kWh), three power outputs and either rear or four-wheel drive. During its introduction, a limited edition called the Project 45 was available, and only 3,000 units were made.

In April 2022, the Ioniq 5 received a larger battery for the European market. The previous 72.6 kWh battery was replaced with a 77.4 kWh battery with an increased power output by 8 kW (11 PS; 11 hp) to 168 kW (228 PS; 225 hp), while the entry-level 58 kWh battery option remains. Optional Digital Centre Mirror (DCM) and Digital Side Mirrors (DSM) also became available.

=== Latin America ===
==== Brazil ====
The Ioniq 5 was launched in Brazil on 24 September 2024, in the sole Signature grade using the 84 kWh battery pack.

==== Mexico ====
The Ioniq 5 was launched in Mexico on 4 July 2024, as the first battery electric vehicle by Hyundai to be marketed in Mexico. It is available with two variants: Limited Tech and the high-performance N model.

=== Middle East ===
The Ioniq 5 was launched in the GCC countries in July 2023 with an option of RWD 125 kW (170 PS; 168 hp) single motor with a 58 kWh battery, or an AWD dual motor 225 kW (306 PS; 302 hp) with a 72.6 kWh battery.

=== North America ===
The Ioniq 5 was released in the US in May 2021, and went on sale in December 2021 as a 2022 model year. The initial model year is equipped with a 77.4 kWh battery. The entry-level models are powered by a rear-mounted single motor producing 168 kW (228 PS; 225 hp), while the more powerful models are available as a dual-motor version with AWD and 239 kW (325 PS; 321 hp) power output. A Standard Range model with a 58 kWh battery and a power output of 125 kW (170 PS; 168 hp) was released in spring 2022. Specific to the American and Canadian Ioniq 5, the vehicle is equipped a marker inside the headlamps, and tail lamps that blink completely as turn indicators.

In Canada, Hyundai introduced the cheapest trim called the Essential for the 2022 model year only. The trim retailed at C$44,999, just below the C$45,000 threshold required (before April 2022) for the entire Ioniq 5 line-up to be eligible for Canada's Incentives for Zero-Emission Vehicles (iZEV) credit. The trim removed heat pump, a battery heater, and the ability to DC fast charge. Described as a "compliance" trim, it is the only Ioniq 5 not equipped with a DC fast charge capability in the world. Hyundai discontinued the trim since the 2023 model year after selling only 30 units.

In November 2024, Hyundai introduced the 2025 model year Ioniq 5 for US and Canada. It is built at Metaplant, Hyundai's newly built electric vehicle manufacturing site located in Bryan County, Georgia, US. In addition to the changes from the global market Ioniq 5 such as revised styling and larger battery size, the model also adopted the North American Charging Standard (NACS) port and became available with more rugged XRT variant.

=== Oceania ===
==== Australia ====
The Ioniq 5 went on sale in Australia on 27 September 2021, in a sole trim, using the Long Range powertrain with the option between RWD (single motor) and AWD (dual motor) setups. Three trim levels are available: Dynamiq, Techniq, and Epiq, with AWD standard on the top trim.

The Ioniq 5 N was launched in Australia on 23 February 2024, the introduction of the Hyundai N performance sub-brand to the Australian market. At the time of its introduction, the Ioniq 5 N was the most expensive Hyundai vehicle on sale in Australia.

The facelifted Ioniq 5 was launched on 23 July 2024, with the option of a N Line styling package.

In December 2025, the 2026 model year changes for the Ioniq 5 saw the number of variants reduced from 16 to four, new Elite and Premium trims replaced the former Dynamiq and Epiq trims, N-Line styling option was removed (became standard on the Premium trim), and all variants use the 84 kWh battery pack.

== Concepts and prototypes ==
=== Robotaxi ===
The Ioniq 5 Robotaxi was unveiled on 31 August 2021 and displayed at IAA Mobility 2021 on 6 September 2021. Lyft began offering transport by driverless Ioniq 5 Robotaxis on the Las Vegas Strip on 16 August 2022. The Ioniq 5 Robotaxi will have a human driver present until the end of 2022, after which the cars will operate on their own.

Since late 2023, the Ioniq 5 Robotaxi are assembled at the Hyundai Motor Group Innovation Centre in Singapore (HMGICS) facility to be exported to the US.

Waymo started testing the model in US cities in November, 2025. The cars will be built in Hyundai's Metaplant in Georgia and will replace Waymo's aging robotaxi fleet. The vehicles are equipped with Waymo's sixth-generation fully autonomous technology, the Waymo Driver, and are fitted with autonomous-ready modifications including redundant hardware and power doors.

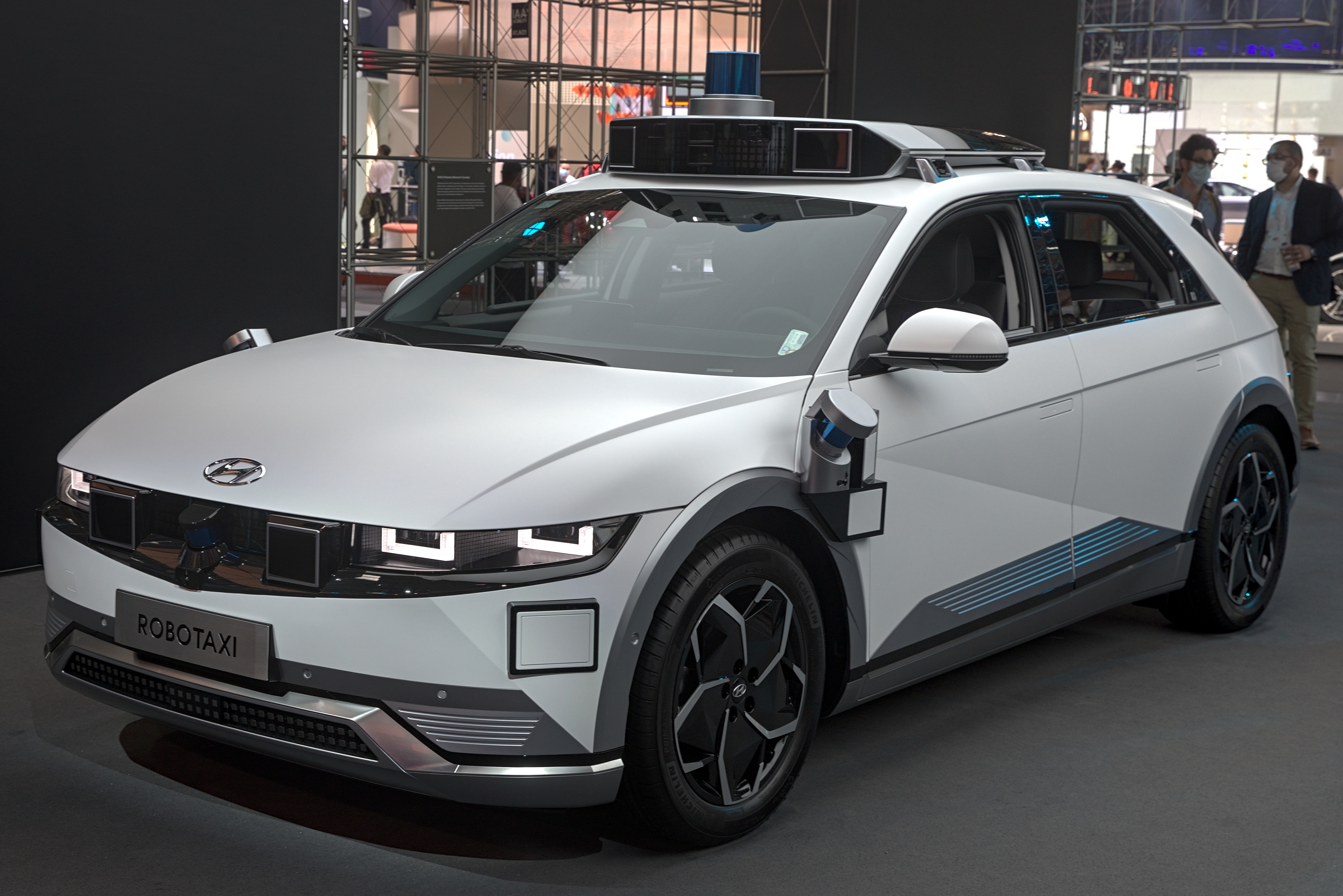
Robotaxi

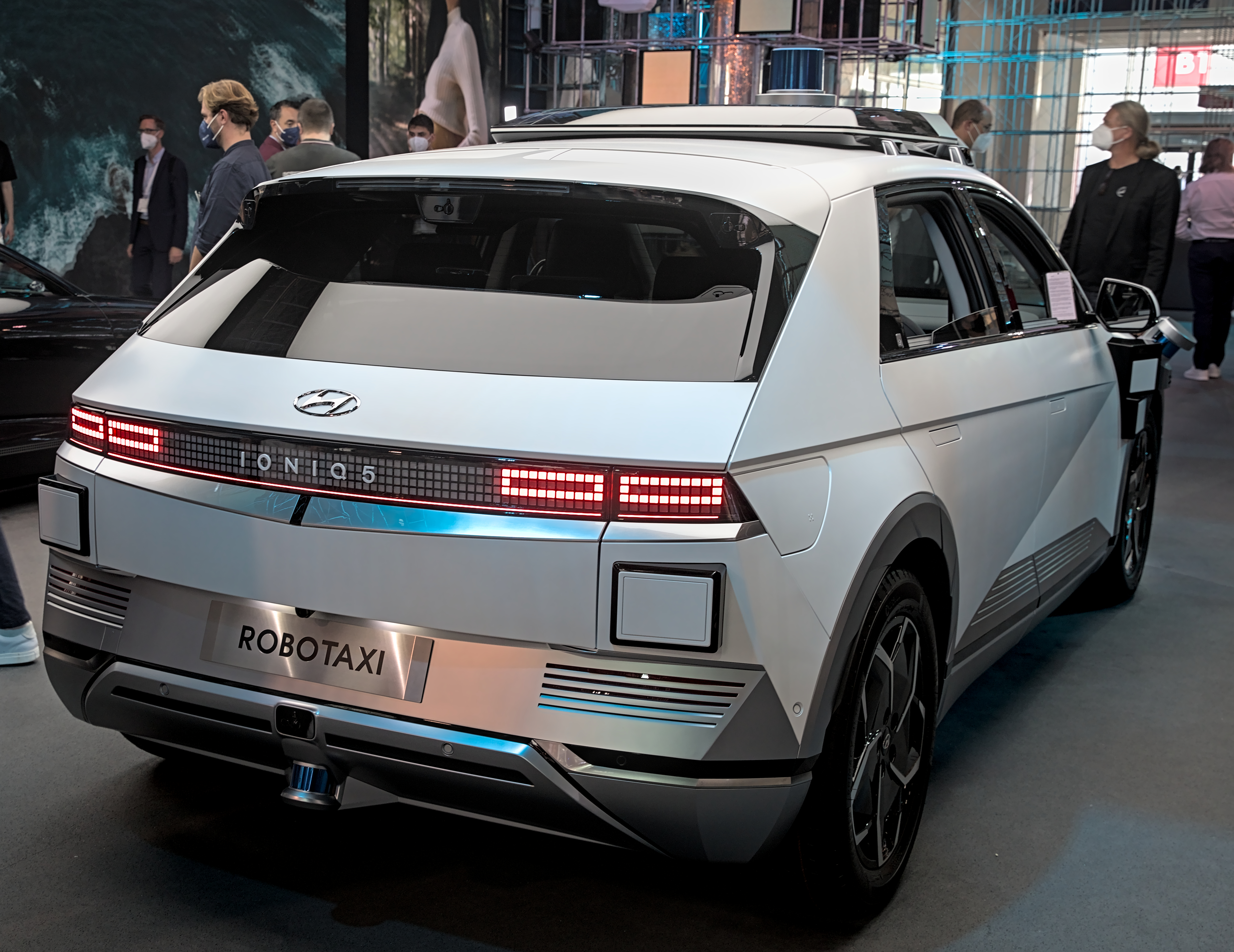
Rear view

=== Hyundai Mobis MOBION ===
The Hyundai Mobis MOBION is a concept vehicle and technology demonstrator based on the Ioniq 5, unveiled by Hyundai Mobis at CES 2024 in Las Vegas. The vehicle is equipped with Hyundai Mobis's e-Corner System, which enables lateral movement, diagonal driving, stationary 360-degree pivot turns by independently controlling all four wheels.

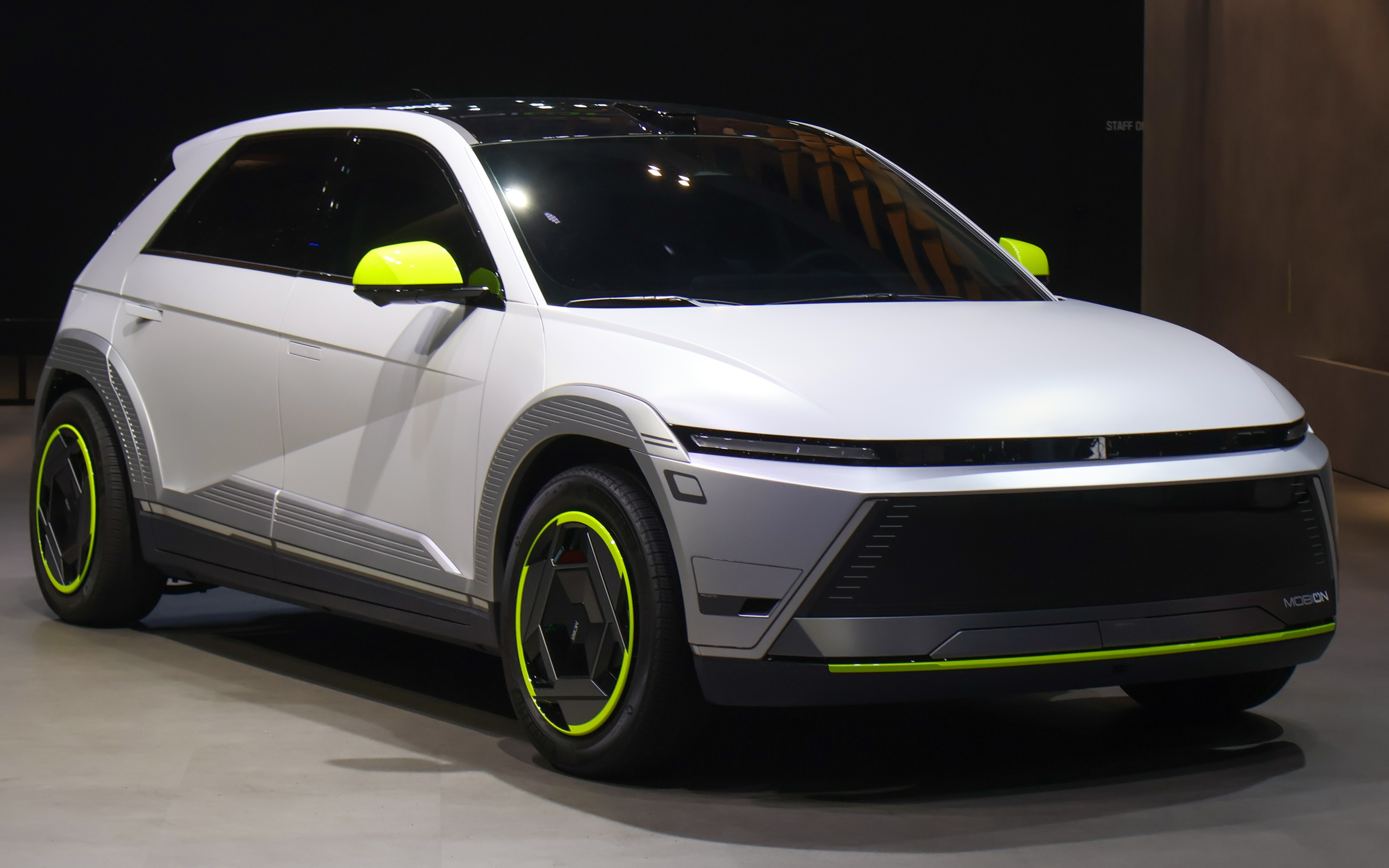
Hyundai Mobis MOBION Concept

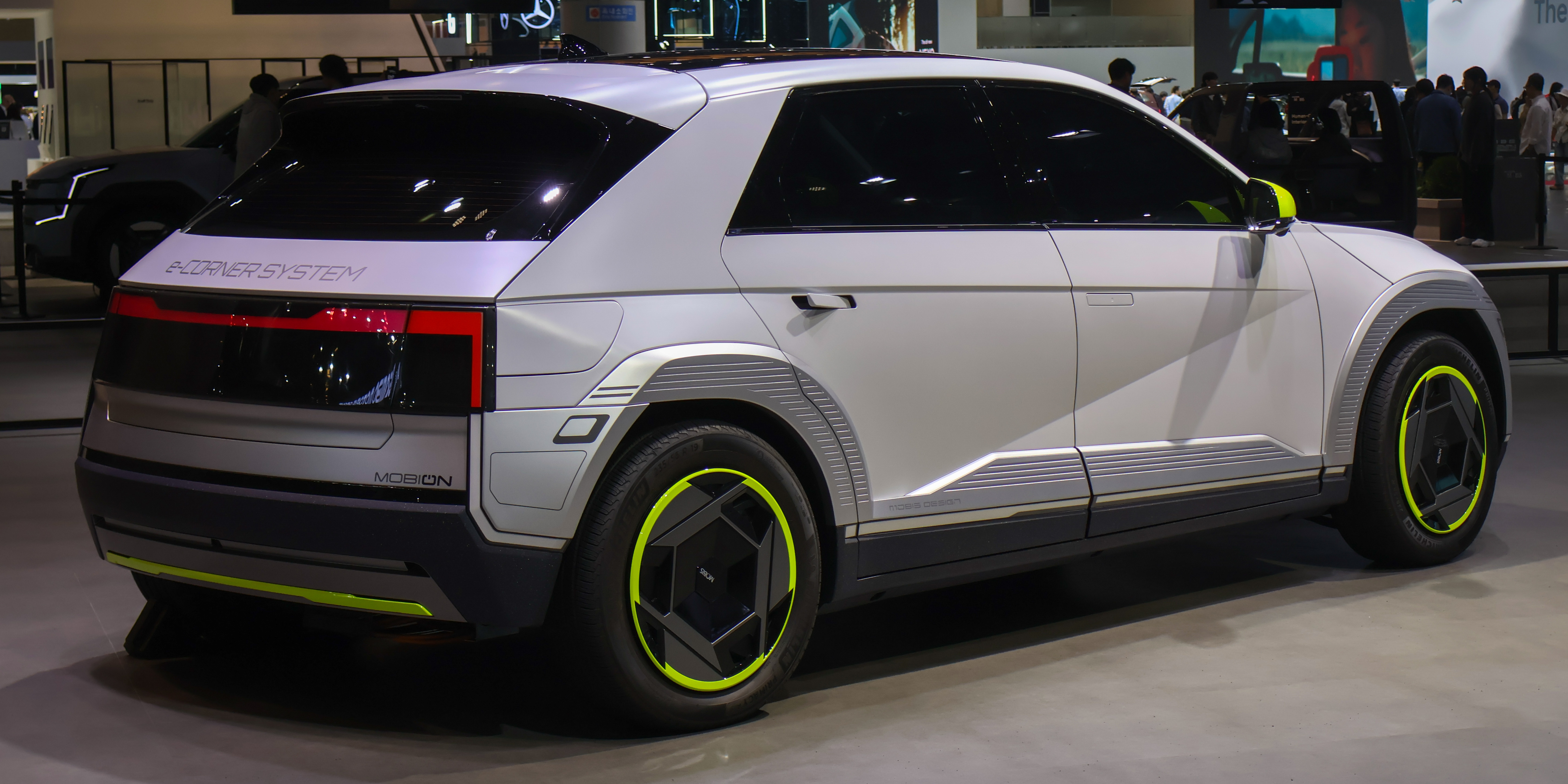
Rear view

== Awards ==
=== Ioniq 5 ===
- Car of the Year 2021, Mid-size Company Car of the Year 2021, and Premium Electric Car of the Year 2021 from Auto Express at the New Car Awards 2021.
- Won 2021 IDEA Design Award gold prize.
- 2022 New Zealand Car of the Year
- 2022 German Car of the Year
- Best Design at the 'Top Gear Electric Awards 2021'.
- 2022 World Car of the Year, World Electric Vehicle of the Year and World Car Design of the Year from World Car Awards.
- 2022 EV of the Year, Car and Driver
- 2022-2023 Japan Import Car of the Year
- 2023 The Straits Times Car of the Year
- 2024 ''Green Car Award'' at the Indian Car of the Year (ICOTY).

=== Ioniq 5 N ===
- 2024 World Performance Car
- 2024 EV of the Year, Car and Driver
- 2024 Korea Car of the Year

== Safety ==
=== IIHS ===
The 2022 Ioniq 5 was awarded "Top Safety Pick+" by the IIHS.

The 2026 Ioniq 5 was also awarded "Top Safety Pick+" by the IIHS.

IIHS scores
Small overlap front	Good	
Moderate overlap front: updated test	Good	
Side: updated test	Good	
Whiplash prevention (varies by trim/option)	Good	
Headlights (varies by trim/option)	Good	Acceptable
Front crash prevention: vehicle-to-vehicle 2.0	Accpetable	
Front crash prevention: pedestrian	Good	
Seat belt reminders	Good	
LATCH ease of use	Acceptable	

=== Euro NCAP ===
Euro NCAP test results Hyundai Ioniq 5 GL (LHD) (2021)
Test	Points	%
Overall:	5 /5 stars	
Adult occupant:	33.8	88%
Child occupant:	42.6	86%
Pedestrian:	34.4	63%
Safety assist:	14.2	88%

=== ANCAP ===
The Ioniq 5 was awarded a five-star safety rating in 2021 for all variants apart from the Ioniq 5 N, which has not been tested.

ANCAP test results Hyundai Ioniq 5 all variants excluding IONIQ 5 N (2021, aligned with Euro NCAP)
Test	Points	%
Overall:	5 /5 stars	
Adult occupant:	33.77	88%
Child occupant:	43.03	87%
Pedestrian:	34.39	63%
Safety assist:	14.24	89%

== Sales ==
In South Korea, the best-selling EV for 2022 was the Ioniq 5, recording 27,399 vehicle sales.

Calendar year	South Korea	U.S	Canada	Europe	Indonesia		Global sales
Calendar year	South Korea	U.S	Canada	Europe	Ioniq 5	Ioniq 5 N	Global sales
2021	22,671	153	—	19,219	—	—	65,906
2022	27,399	22,982	5,037	30,996	1,829	—	99,536
2023	16,605	33,918	5,097	23,907	7,176	—	114,988
2024	14,213	44,400	13,484	16,592	1,508	53	93,349
2025	14,211	47,039	4,773	17,749	759	20	—

== See also ==
- Ioniq
- List of Hyundai vehicles
- Plug-in electric vehicles in India
