= BlueOval SK =

2021–2026 Ford–SK On joint venture

BlueOval SK, LLC
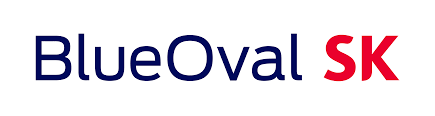
- Type: Joint venture
- Industry: Electric vehicle batteries
- Founded: 2021
- Defunct: 2026
- Fate: Dissolved
- Key people: Jiem Cranney (CEO); Robert Lee (CFO); Michael Adams (CPO); Sangkyu Han (CTO)
- Owner: Ford Motor Company (50%); SK On Co., Ltd (50%)
- Number of employees: ~2000 (2025)
- Website: www.blueovalsk.com

BlueOval SK, LLC (BOSK) was an electric vehicle battery joint venture between Ford Motor Company of the United States and SK On of South Korea from 2021 to 2026. The batteries were for use in Ford and Lincoln vehicles. Three battery plants were planned, two in Kentucky and one in Tennessee. Both Governors Andy Beshear and Bill Lee stated that it was the "single largest investment" in their state's history.

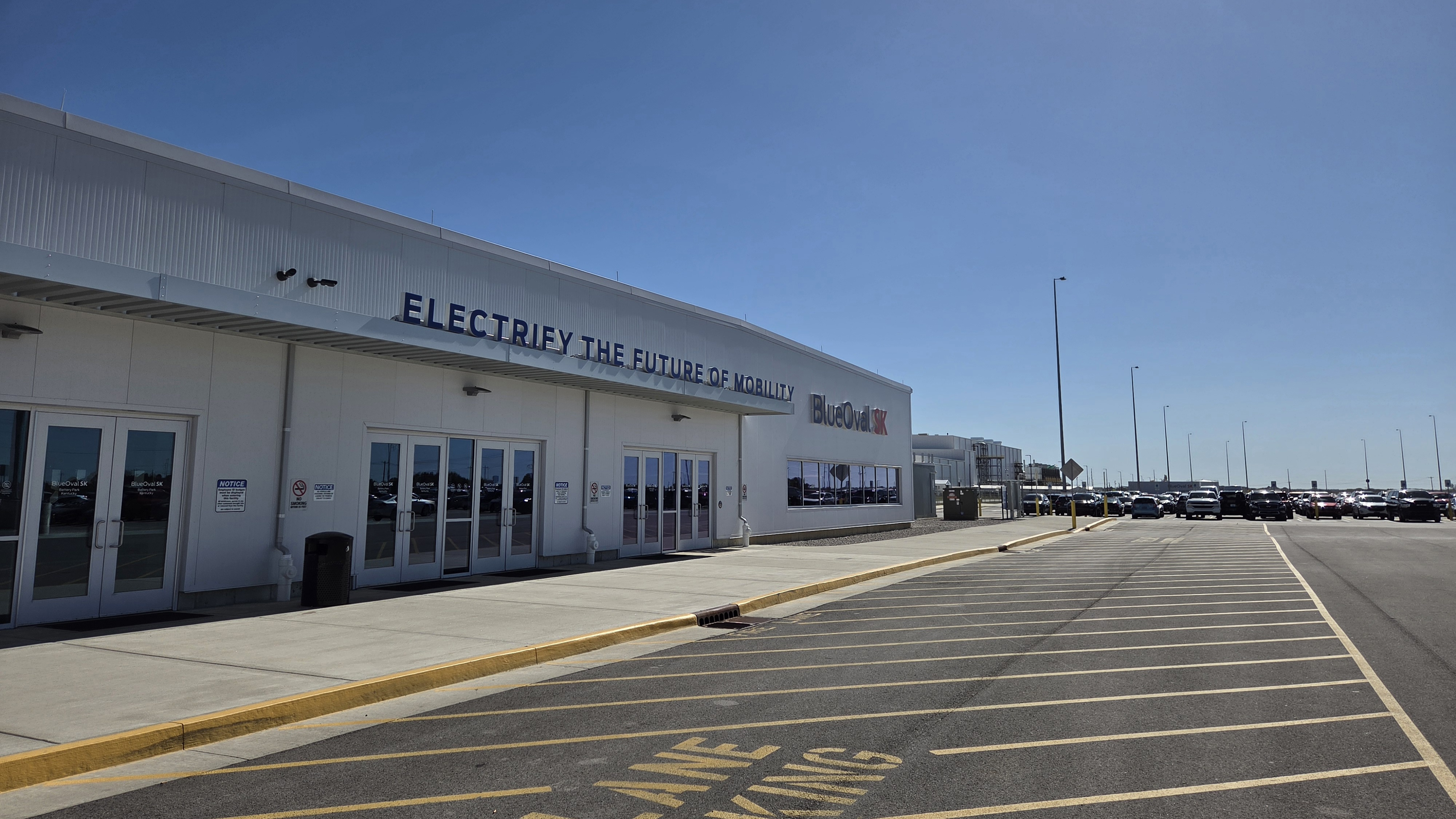
BlueOval SK Battery Park in Glendale, Kentucky on October 22, 2025

== History ==
=== 2021 to 2022 ===
In May 2021, the two companies announced an MoU for the joint venture, with the goal of producing approximately 60 GWh per year by the middle of the decade, along with 11,000 jobs. In September, a Kentucky bill designated $350 million in forgivable loans, $250 million of which would be given to BOSK. That month, sites were announced for Stanton, Tennessee and Glendale, Kentucky. The announcement gained the support of Republican officials from the two states who were noted for opposing efforts like the Green New Deal. Groundbreaking began on both sites in 2022.

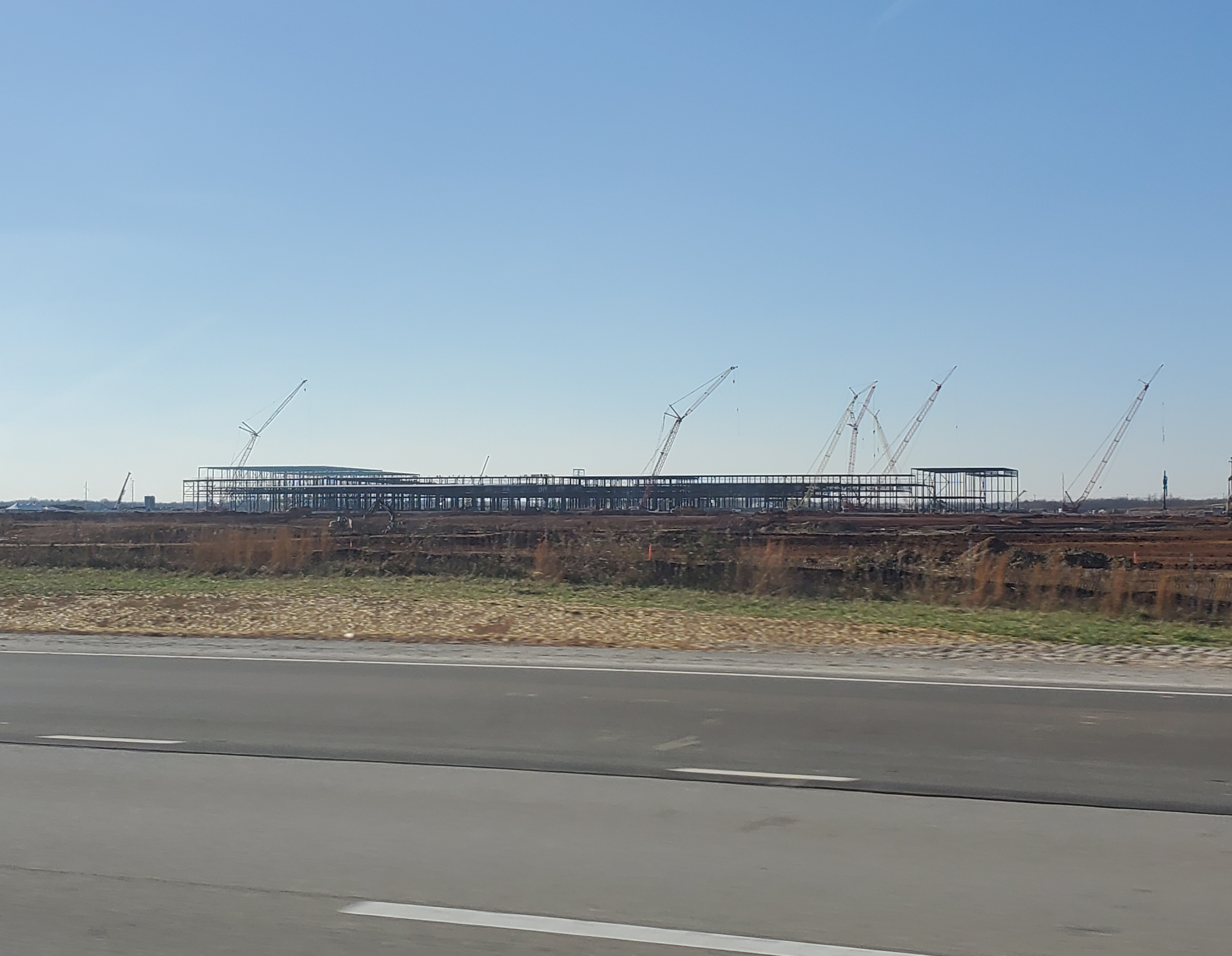
BlueOval SK Battery Park in Glendale, Kentucky under construction on December 18, 2022

=== 2023 to 2024 ===
In March 2023, United States Secretary of Transportation Pete Buttigieg visited the Kentucky site, speaking on the effects of the Inflation Reduction Act on increased domestic production. In June, the United States Department of Energy announced a loan of $9.2 billion for the JV. In October, Ford announced a slowdown of investments, including BOSK, to match declining EV demand. The second Glendale plant was delayed. In December 2024, the DOE finalized the direct loan at $9.63 billion.

=== 2025 to 2026 ===
In January 2025, the United Auto Workers petitioned the National Labor Relations Board for a union election at the Kentucky site. It stated that the majority of employees were supportive of a union. The results of the vote, in August, were contested by BOSK on the grounds of ineligible ballots. Production at the Kentucky plant started the week before the vote. In October, Governor Lee visited Seoul to meet with SK On's CEO. In December, Ford announced a halt to its plans for larger electric vehicles due to regulatory, demand, and cost issues. It entered a JV disposition agreement with SK On and SK Battery America, dividing ownership of the plants. A Ford subsidiary would exclusively operate the Kentucky battery plants, while SK On would take Tennessee's. The Tennessee Electric Vehicle Center in BlueOval City was renamed to the "Tennessee Truck Plant." The focus of Ford's battery production shifted to battery energy storage systems for data centers and the electric grid. The Kentucky plant's work force would be laid off by February 2026, with the plan to rehire 2,100 employees in 2027 after retooling.

In January 2026, the NLRB greenlit the progress of the union's certification. BOSK planned to file an appeal, with future unionization status of the plant's rehired workers in the air. In February, it was reported that Ford would not operate the second building in Kentucky and would look for other manufacturers that might be interested in it. In March, 150 employees at the Tennessee site were laid off.

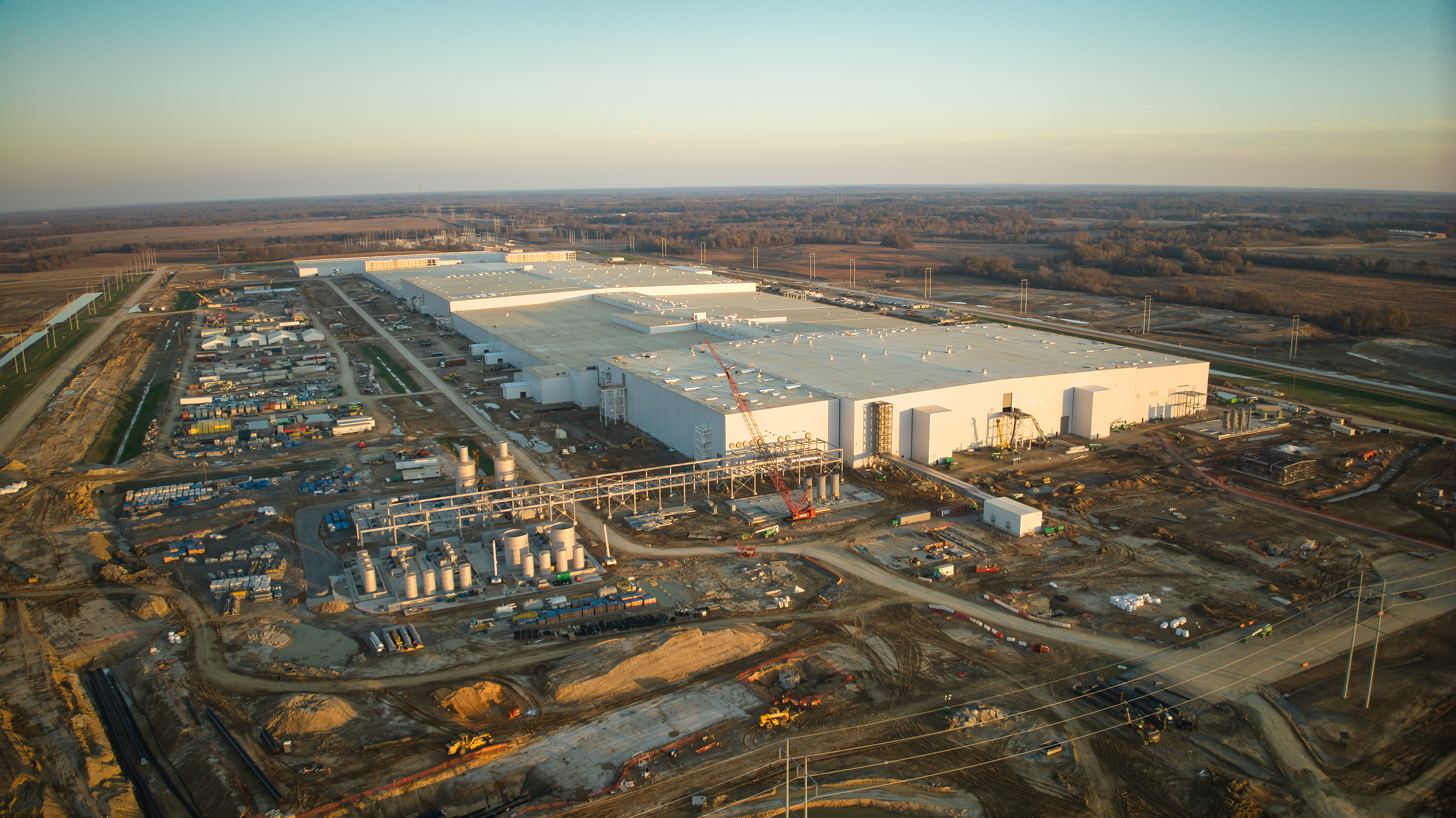
BlueOval City in Stanton, Tennessee

== Sites ==
BlueOval City was constructed on the Memphis Regional Megasite, which had failed to attract a tenant for years due to wastewater treatment issues. The Battery Park was constructed on a site purchased by the Kentucky state in 2002 to attract Hyundai to build a car plant.

| Name | Location | Investment (USD) | Products |
|---|---|---|---|
| BlueOval SK Battery Park | Kentucky | 5.8 billion | batteries |
| BlueOval City | Tennessee | 5.6 billion | batteries, Ford F-150 Lightning |

== See also ==
- Battery industry of South Korea
