= SK On =

South Korean battery company

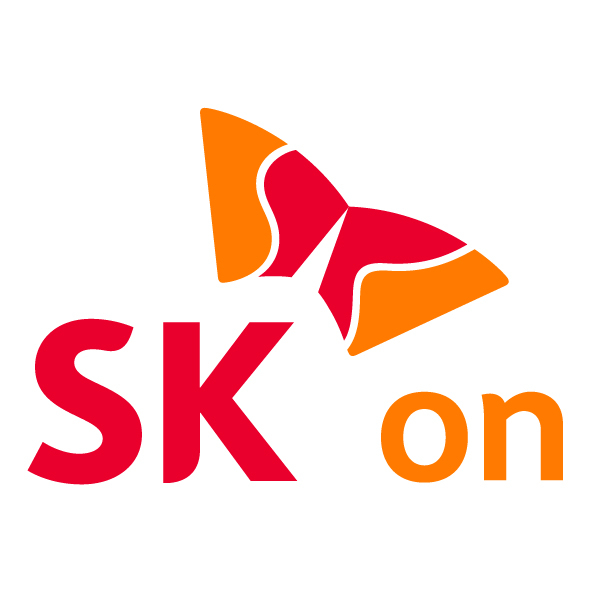
- Type: Subsidiary
- Industry: battery
- Headquarters: Seoul, South Korea
- Parent: SK Innovation
- Website: http://eng.sk-on.com/

SK On (Korean: SK온) is a battery company headquartered in Seoul, South Korea. Spun off in 2021, it is a subsidiary of SK Innovation, a member of SK Group. Its batteries are used for electric vehicles and ESS. SK Trading International, SK Enterm, and SK Enmove were merged into SK On from 2024 to 2025.

== History ==
In July 2021, SK Innovation announced the spin-off of its battery business. The entity launched as SK On in October. In December 2022, SK On announced a new plant with Hyundai in Cartersville, Georgia. In February 2023, SK On withdrew from a joint venture with Ford and Koç Holding in Turkey. In August, construction started on a cathode material plant joint venture with EcoPro BM and Ford in Bécancour, Quebec. Construction was paused multiple times.

In November 2024, SK Trading International (a crude oil and petroleum products affiliate) merged into its sister company SK On. In February 2025, SK Enterm (a commercial tank terminal operator under SK Trading International) also merged into SK On. In March, SK On secured a supply contract with Nissan. In April, Slate chose SK On as its battery supplier. In July, SK On announced the acquisition of SK Enmove, a lubricant maker under SK Innovation. In September, SK On completed construction on an all-solid-state battery plant in Daejeon, South Korea. In November, SK On swapped stakes in its two joint ventures with Eve Power in China, taking full ownership of the Jiangsu site. In December, SK On and Ford announced the dissolution of their joint venture BlueOval SK, with SK On taking the Tennessee battery facility. In March 2026, SK On laid off more than a third of its workforce at its plant in Commerce, Georgia.

== Manufacturing locations ==
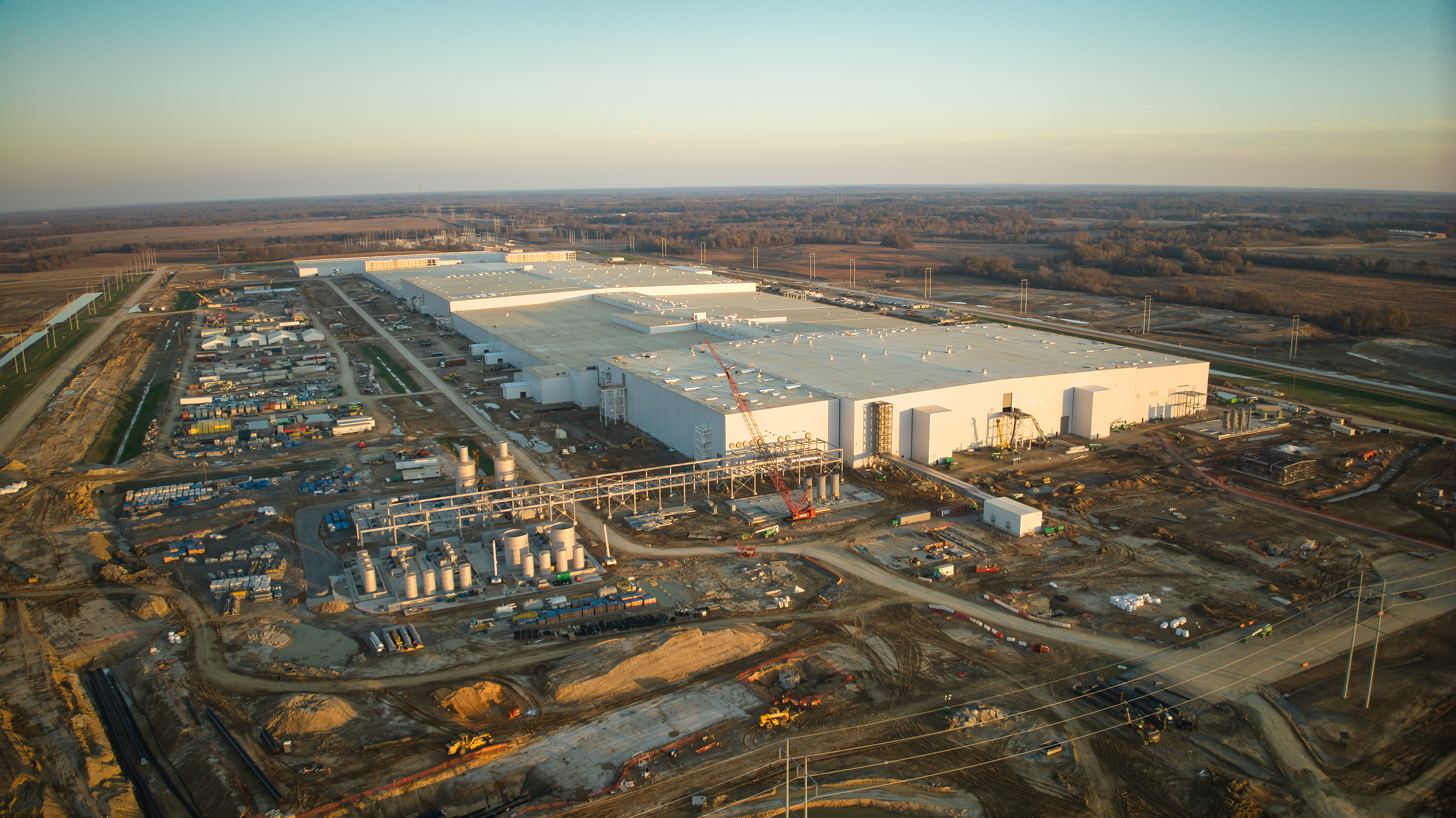
Site of former joint venture with Ford in Tennessee

In 2019, SK Innovation began construction of its first U.S. electric vehicle battery manufacturing facility in Commerce, Georgia. The 2.4 million-square-foot plant, located on 283 acres along Interstate 85 approximately 65 miles northeast of Atlanta, was completed in two phases, with Phase 1 completed in 2020 and Phase 2 completed in late 2021, at a combined investment of approximately $2.6 billion. The plant, which supplies Volkswagen and Hyundai, became part of SK On following that company's spin-off from SK Innovation in October 2021.

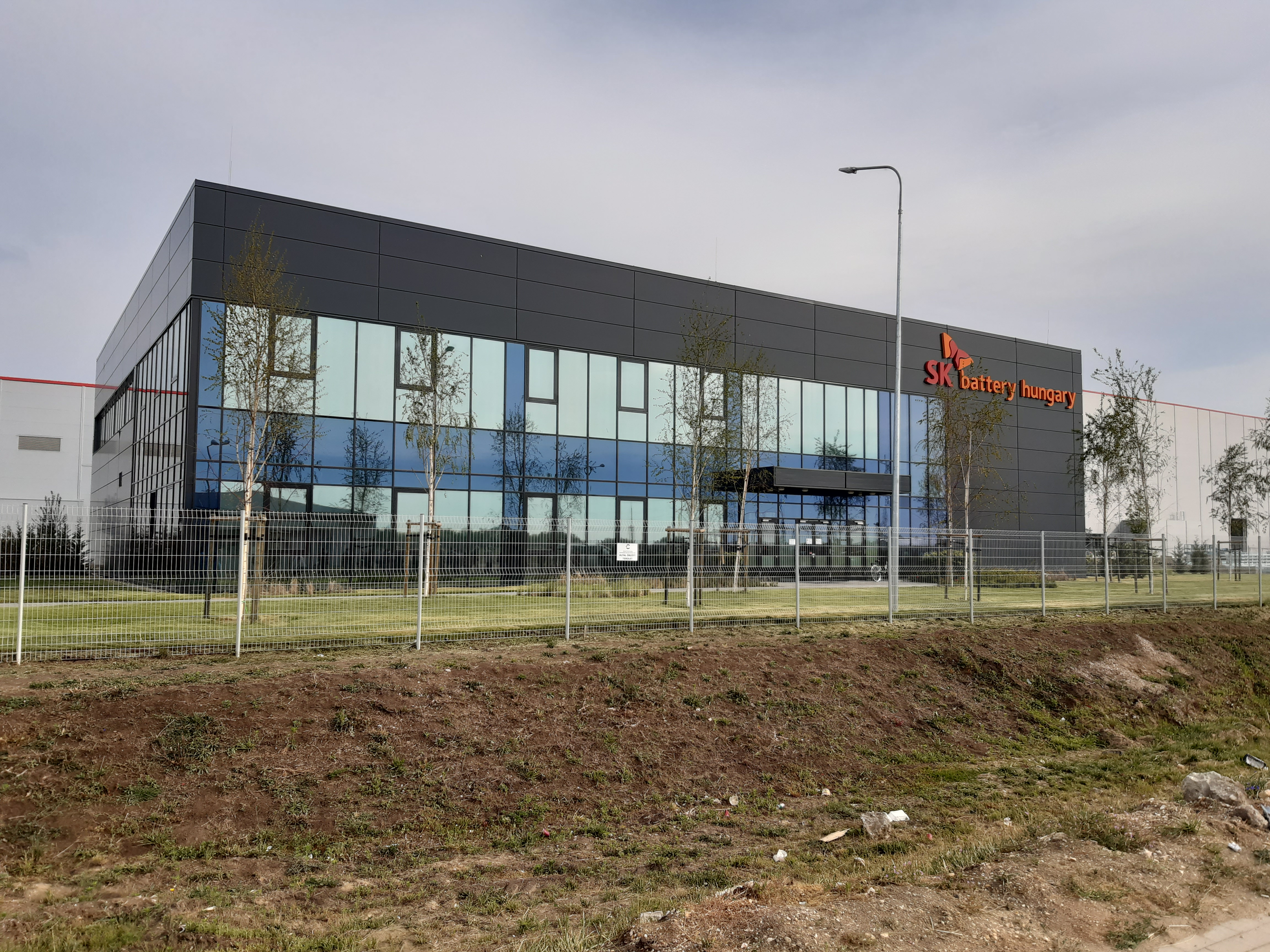
SK office in Hungary

City	Country	Reference
Seosan	South Korea	
Commerce	United States	
Stanton	United States	
Kingston	United States	
Yancheng	China	
Beijing	China	
Changzhou	China	
Komárom	Hungary	
Iváncsa	Hungary	

== See also ==
- Battery industry of South Korea
- BAIC Group
