= Bad Obsession Motorsport =

- Thumbnail of Project Binky, episode 38 (29 Apr 2023)
- Known for: Project Binky, BRSCC CityCar Cup series

Bad Obsession Motorsport is a Shropshire, England-based race and fabrication workshop run by Nik Blackhurst and Richard Brunning. They are best known for Project Binky, a project to build "the world's fastest Mini" restomod by fitting an original Mini with running gear from an all-wheel-drive turbocharged Toyota Celica GT-Four. Blackhurst and Brunning have filmed the "obsessive" project and released it as a series of videos on YouTube since August 17, 2013. As of November 2025, the "six month" project has been announced as "complete" and no further build videos will be produced. Blackhurst and Brunning have moved to their transporter build ("The Escargot", a pun on both the model of vehicle and a reference to snails), a 1985 Ford Cargo truck.

Episode one is titled “A Case Of Tinworm”, a colloquial term for rust, acknowledging that the Mini was badly rotted out. They note that “they say it can’t be done,” but they attempt it anyway. The ethos of the project was to fit the Toyota running gear into the profile of the 1980 Mini 1000, originally fitted with a 60bhp A-series engine, with no externally visible changes beyond normal modifications seen on period cars - the self-imposed rules include no lengthening of the vehicle. The 2.0 litre turbocharged Toyota unit has 200bhp, and is substantially larger ("No, the engine doesn't fit"), especially with accessories including turbocharger, charge cooler, air conditioning, oil cooler, and power steering.

The attention to detail is noted by several sources, though traditional techniques such as cardboard templating (billed "Cardboard Aided Design", or CAD) are used.

Alongside Binky, Bad Obsession Motorsport also raced a Citroën C1 in the BRSCC CityCar Cup series, documented in their Bargain Racement series, in support of Mission Motorsport, a charity supporting disabled veterans through motorsport.
