= Ford Ecotorq engine =

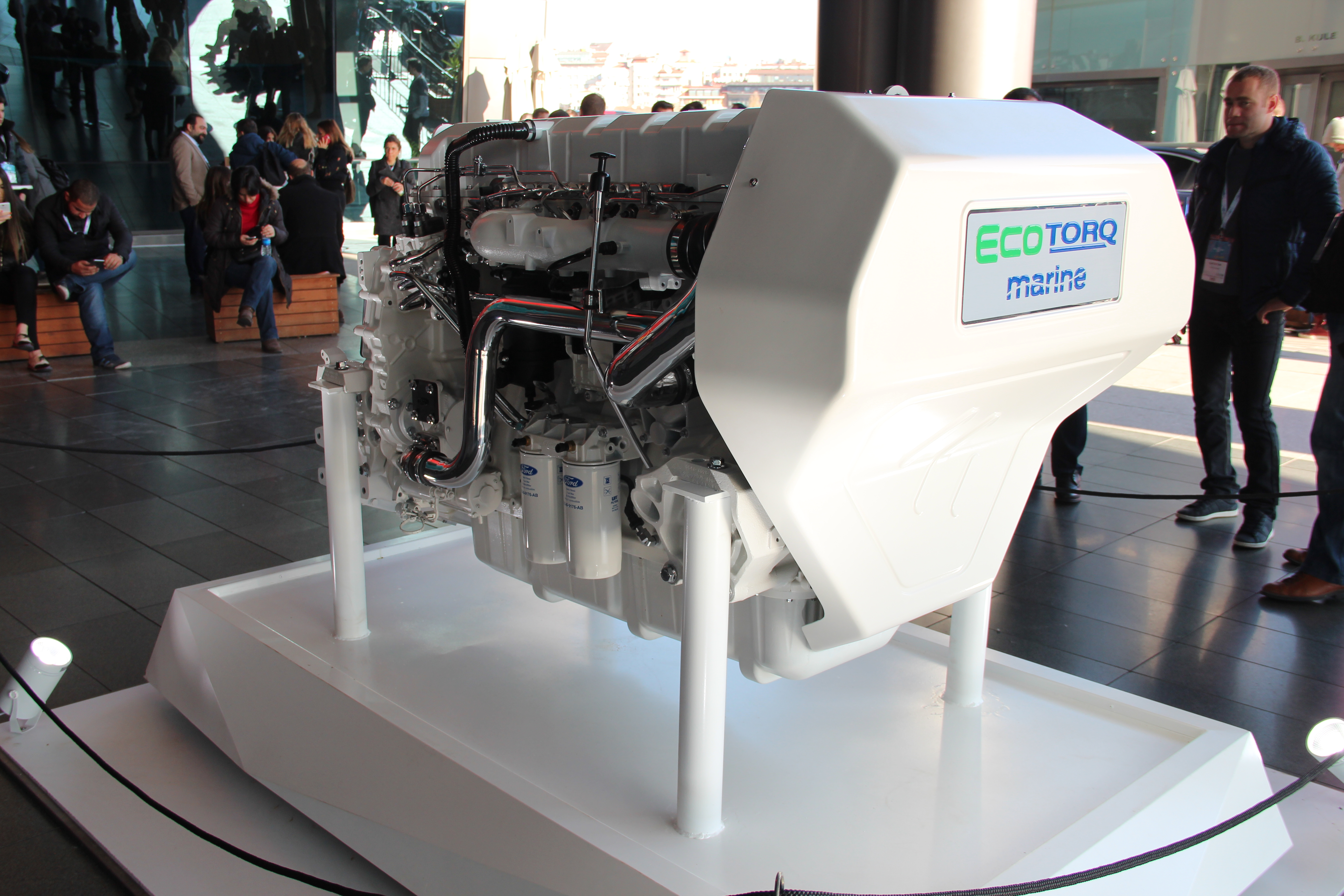
- Marinized version of 12.7L Ecotorq engine.

Overview
- Manufacturer: Ford Otosan
- Also called: Ford Cargo engine
- Production: 2003-present

Layout
- Configuration: OHV straight-six (First generation); OHC straight-six (Second generation)
- Displacement: 7,330 cc (450 cu in) 8,974 cc (550 cu in) 12,740 cc (780 cu in)
- Cylinder bore: 103 mm (4.1 in) (7.3L) 115 mm (4.5 in) (9.0L) 130 mm (5.1 in) (12.7L)
- Piston stroke: 144 mm (5.7 in); 160 mm (6.3 in)
- Valvetrain: OHV 24 valve (first generation); OHC 24 valve (second generation)
- Compression ratio: 17:1 (12.7L); 17.4:1 (7.3L); 17.6:1 (9.0L)

Combustion
- Fuel system: Common Rail
- Management: Bosch EDC
- Fuel type: EN 590 Diesel
- Oil system: Wet sump 30 L for first generation, 50 L for second generation

Output
- Power output: 240 PS (177 kW) - 300 PS (221 kW) (7.3L); 260 PS (191 kW) - 380 PS (279 kW) (9.0L); 420 PS (309 kW) - 500 PS (368 kW) (12.7L)
- Torque output: 840 N⋅m (620 lb⋅ft) - 1,000 N⋅m (738 lb⋅ft) (7.3L) 1,100 N⋅m (811 lb⋅ft) - 2,000 N⋅m (1,475 lb⋅ft) (9.0L) 2,150 N⋅m (1,586 lb⋅ft) - 2,500 N⋅m (1,844 lb⋅ft) (12.7L)

Emissions
- Emissions target standard: Euro-1 to Euro-3 (7.3L); Euro-3 to Euro-5 (9.0L); Euro-3 to Euro-6D (12.7L)

Chronology
- Predecessor: Ford Dover engine

Ecotorq is a heavy duty diesel engine family primarily used in Ford Cargo heavy duty trucks, designed and built by Ford Otosan. Ecotorq is the first diesel engine which is completely built with CAD/CAM technologies in Turkey. Ecotorq family is produced in Ford Otosan's truck and engine transmission plant located in İnönü, and JMC Xiaolan engine plant in Nanchang, China under license of Ford Otosan.

The Ecotorq engine was developed along the second generation Ford Cargo (H298) heavy duty truck, which is a in-house project of Ford Otosan. The first generation of Ecotorq engine made its debut in 2003. It replaces the Ford Dorset/Dover series water-cooled turbodiesel engine and competes for the Turkish local market with Cummins B and C series engines used in various BMC trucks, and with Mercedes-Benz and MAN heavy duty engines.

Ecotorq is built two different generations by its debut. Unlike its predecessor, all generations of Ecotorq engine are mounted on the axis of the chassis rather than Dover series engines are mounted with angle, watercooled and 24-valve valvetrain architecture.

== First Generation ==
The first generation of Ecotorq engines made its debut in 2003 along the Ford Cargo (H298) with 7.3L displacement.

== Applications ==
Automotive applications with all generations of Ecotorq include the following:

Users	Models	First Generation (7.3L)	First Generation (9.0L)	Second Generation (12.7L)	Emission Level
Ford Trucks	Cargo (H298)	240 PS - 300 PS			Euro 3
Ford Trucks	Cargo (H476)	260 PS - 320 PS	300 PS - 360 PS - 380 PS		Euro 4 - 5
Ford Trucks	Cargo (H566)		330 PS	420 PS - 480 PS	Euro 6
Ford Trucks	F-Max (H625)			500 PS	Euro 6D
KrAZ	KrAZ-6322; KrAZ-63221		360 PS - 380 PS		Euro 5
KrAZ	KrAZ-65032		360 PS - 380 PS		Euro 5
KrAZ	KrAZ-6511		360 PS - 380 PS		Euro 5
KrAZ	KrAZ-65053		360 PS - 380 PS		Euro 5
JMC	Weilong HV5			480 PS	Stage V/VI
Otokar	Kent C / LF		330 PS		Euro 6
Otokar	Kent C / LF (Articulated)		360 PS		Euro 6

== See also ==
- Ecotorq Engine Family
