= Ford F-Max =

Ford Otosan truck

Ford F-MAX
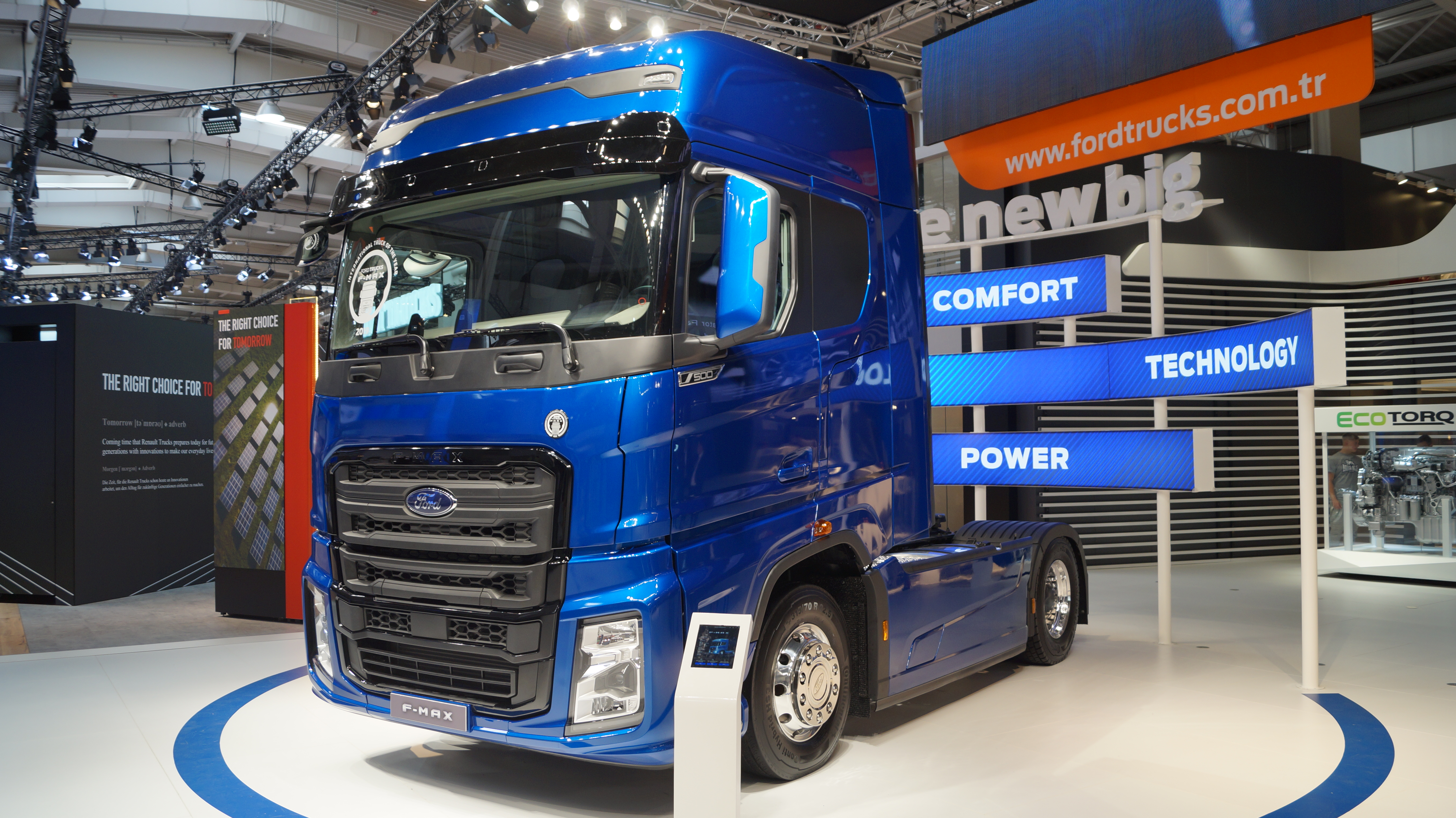

Overview
- Manufacturer: Ford Otosan
- Model code: H625
- Also called: JMC Weilong HV5
- Production: 2018–present
- Assembly: Turkey: İnönü; Russia: Kaliningrad (Avtotor); China: Taiyuan (JMC Heavy Duty Vehicle)
- Designer: Ford Otosan

Body and chassis
- Class: Heavy truck
- Body style: COE

Powertrain
- Engine: Ecotorq 12.7L

Dimensions
- Wheelbase: 3600 mm
- Length: 5925 mm
- Width: 2540 mm
- Height: 3915 mm
- Curb weight: 7379 kg

Chronology
- Predecessor: Ford Cargo

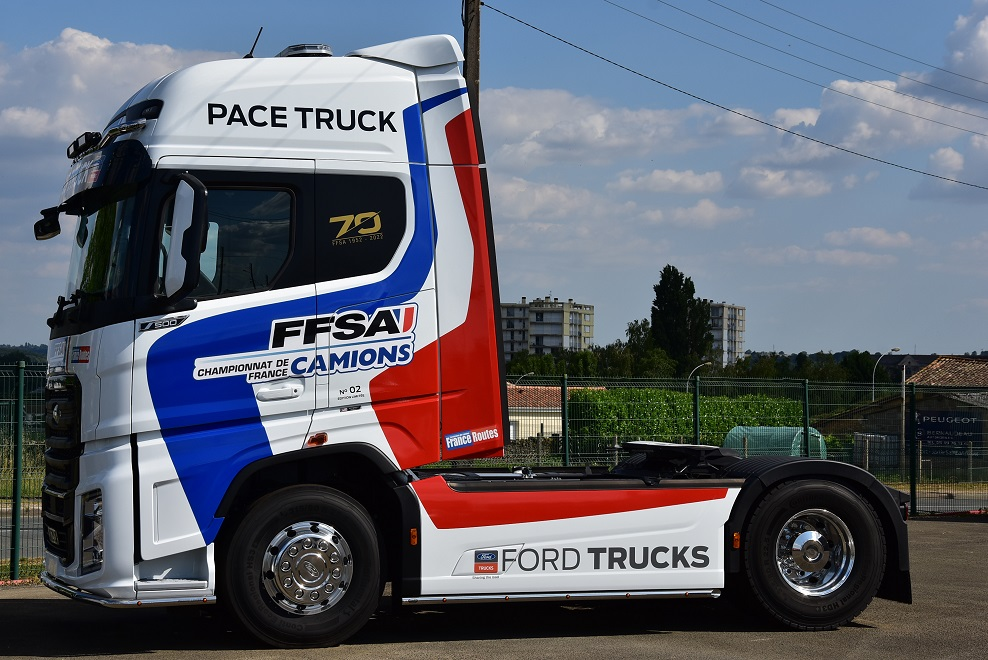
Pace truck (2022)

The Ford F-Max (stylized as Ford F-MAX) is a heavy-duty truck produced by Ford Otosan. It was introduced in 2018.

It was unveiled during the IAA 2018 in Hannover, Germany. It was also chosen to be the International Truck of the Year 2019.

The truck was designed by Ford Otosan over the span of 5 years, under the codenames H625 and "Big Boy".

It is only available in a 4x2 axle configuration and powered by the 12.7 liter Ecotorq Euro 6 engine, delivering 368 kW (493 hp; 500 PS) and 2,500 N⋅m (1,840 lb⋅ft) of torque, coupled to a 12-speed ZF Traxon gearbox.

== Safety ==
Euro NCAP test results Ford F-MAX 4x2 Tractor Unit (2026)
Test	Score
Overall:	3 /5 stars
Safe driving	77%
Crash avoidance	56%
Post crash	80%
