= JMC Heavy Duty Vehicle =

Chinese car manufacturer

JMC Heavy Duty Vehicle Co., Ltd.
- Type: Subsidiary
- Industry: Automotive
- Predecessor: Taiyuan Changan Heavy Truck Company
- Founded: 8 January 2013
- Headquarters: Taiyuan, China
- Area served: China
- Key people: Wu Xiaojun (general manager)
- Products: Trucks
- Operating income: CN¥−303.330 million (2017)
- Net income: CN¥−219.831 million (2017)
- Total assets: CN¥2,061.645 million (2017)
- Total equity: CN¥−327.366 million (2017)
- Parent: Jiangling Motors

Chinese name
- Simplified Chinese: 江铃重型汽车有限公司
- Traditional Chinese: 江鈴重型汽車有限公司
Transcriptions
Standard Mandarin
- Hanyu Pinyin: Jiānglíng Zhòngxíng Qìchē Yǒuxiàn Gōngsī
- Website: www.jmch.com.cn

JMC Heavy Duty Vehicle (JMCH) is a dormant Chinese manufacturer of Ford-based heavy trucks owned by Jiangling Motors. It was established in 2013 as a successor of Taiyuan Changan and is headquartered in Taiyuan.

== History ==
In August 2012, Jiangling Motors announced it would acquire all the stake of the Taiyuan-based heavy truck manufacturer Taiyuan Changan Heavy Truck Company from its shareholders Changan (80% stake) and China South Industries Group Corporation (20%). Taiyuan Changan Heavy Truck had been established in 2007 and planned to sell about 15,000 trucks by 2012 and be in the level of the top-ten truck manufacturers within China, but the actual number that year was about 3,000. Taiyuan Changan Heavy Truck was reincorporated as JMC Heavy Duty Vehicle (JMCH) and restarted operations on 8 January 2013. In July 2014, Ford and JMCH signed an agreement for the latter to produce Ford-based heavy trucks. In 2015, JMCH completed the construction of a new assembly plant and an engine plant. The first product from the company, the Cargo-based Weilong, was unveiled at the 2017 Shanghai Motor Show and deliveries started in October 2017. In 2018, the company introduced the F-MAX-based Weilong HV5.

In August 2020, following constant yearly losses, JMC announced it had spun off JMCH's engine branch into a separate company called Taiyuan Jiangling Power Co., Ltd. In October 2020, it announced it had put a 60% controlling stake from the new company on sale. In January 2021, it announced it had sold the stake to the Yunnei Group (a state-owned holding controlled by the Kunming State-owned Assets Supervision and Administration Commission). That same month, JMC said it would increase the JMCH capital with the aim of improving its assets-liabilities ratio and facilitating a company restructuring. In May 2021, JMC said its board had decided to list JMCH for sale.

In August 2021, Volvo Trucks, a division of Volvo Group, announced its intention to acquire JMCH for around CN¥800 million. In May 2023, Volvo Trucks announced that it had abandoned its takeover and instead would continue to import its products to China. By the end of the month, Jiangling Motors said it had indefinitely suspended JMCH's production and sales.

== Products ==
The company has sold two Ford-based heavy trucks, the Weilong and Weilong HV5, under various configurations.

- Weilong (based on Ford Cargo)
- Weilong HV5 (based on Ford F-MAX)
