= Ford Taunus TC =

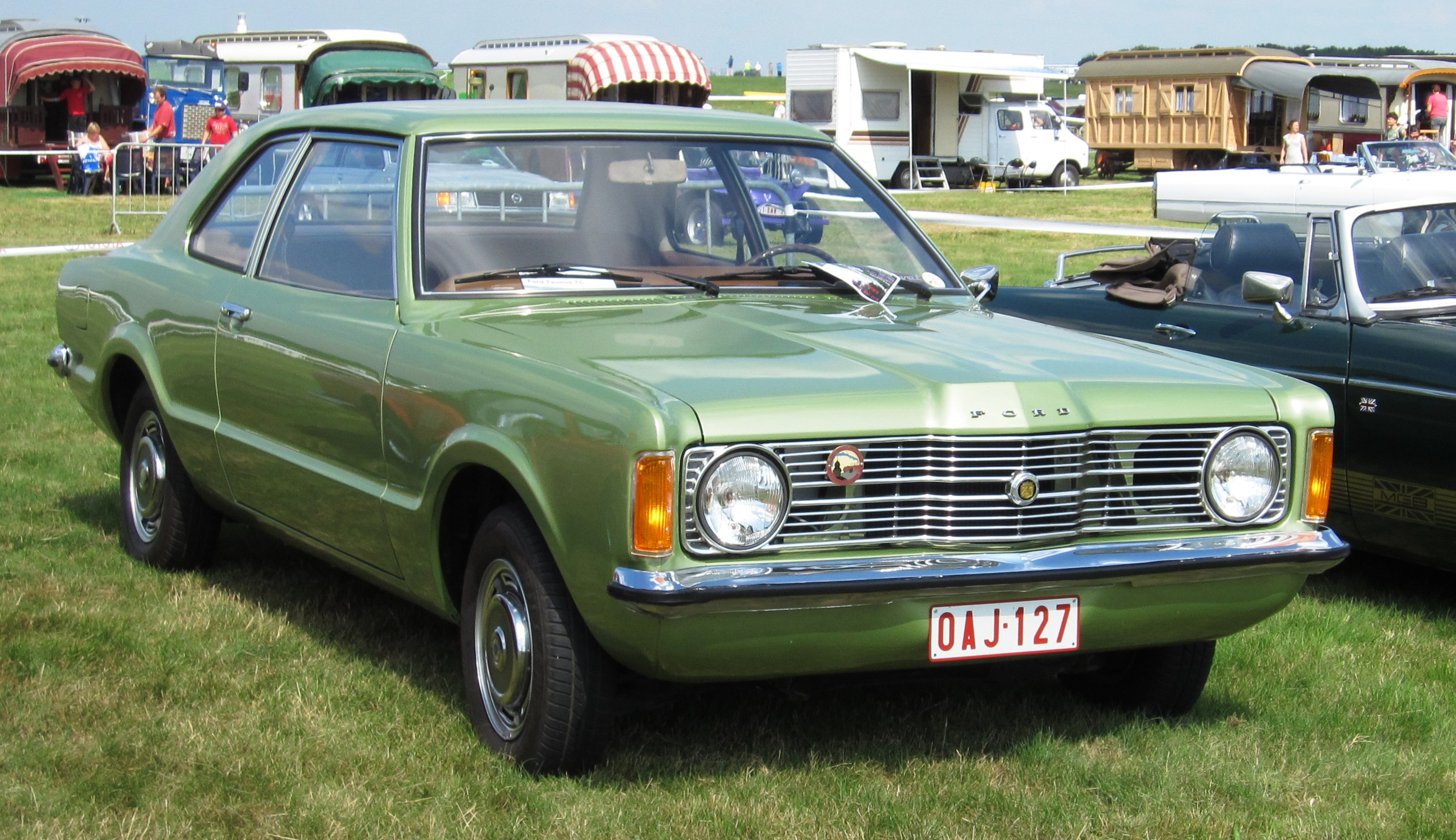

Overview
- Manufacturer: Ford Germany
- Production: 1970–1982 (Europe); 1977–1983 (South Korea); 1974–1984 (Argentina); 1984–1994 (Turkey)
- Assembly: Belgium: Genk; South Korea: Ulsan (Hyundai); Argentina: General Pacheco (Ford Argentina); Turkey: Istanbul (Ford Otosan) Finland:Peräjärvi

Body and chassis
- Class: Large family car (D)
- Body style: 2-/4-door saloon 5-door "Turnier" estate car 2-door coupé (1970–1975)

Powertrain
- Engine: 1294 cm³ Pinto OHC I4 (1970–1982); 1593 cm³ Pinto OHC I4 (1970–1982); 1993 cm³ Pinto OHC I4 (1976–1982); 1999 cm³ Cologne V6 (1970–1982); 2293 cm³ Cologne V6 (1970–1982)
- Transmission: 4-speed manual all-synchromesh 3-speed automatic (optional at extra cost)

Dimensions
- Wheelbase: 2,579 mm (101.5 in)
- Length: 4,340–4,480 mm (170.9–176.4 in)
- Width: 1,700–1,712 mm (66.9–67.4 in)
- Height: 1,362–1,363 mm (53.6–53.7 in)
- Curb weight: 1,480–1,600 kg (3,263–3,527 lb) (laden)

Chronology
- Predecessor: Ford Taunus 12M / 15M P6
- Successor: Ford Sierra

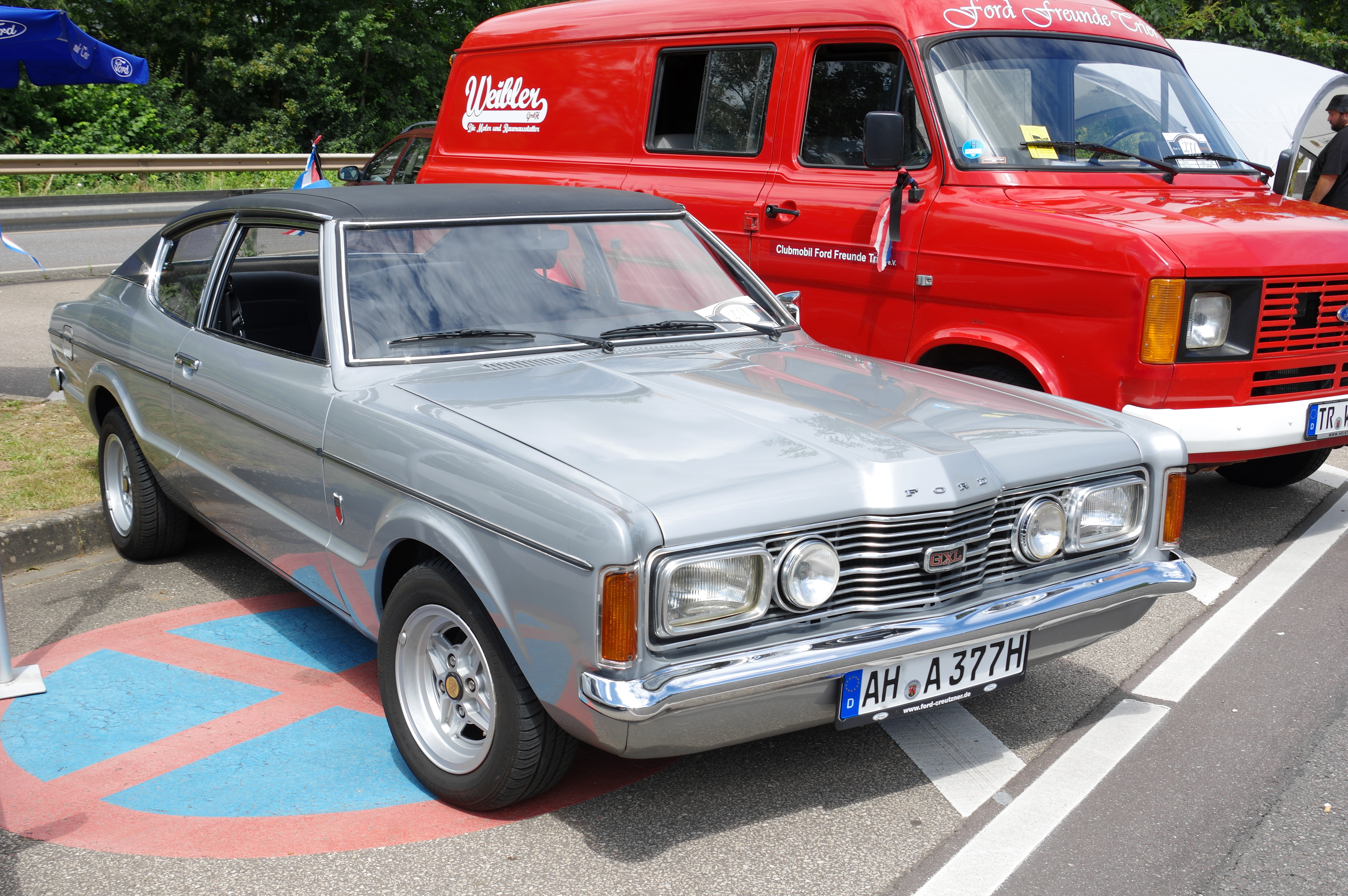
Unlike its Cortina contemporary, the Taunus TC was also produced as a coupé until 1975.

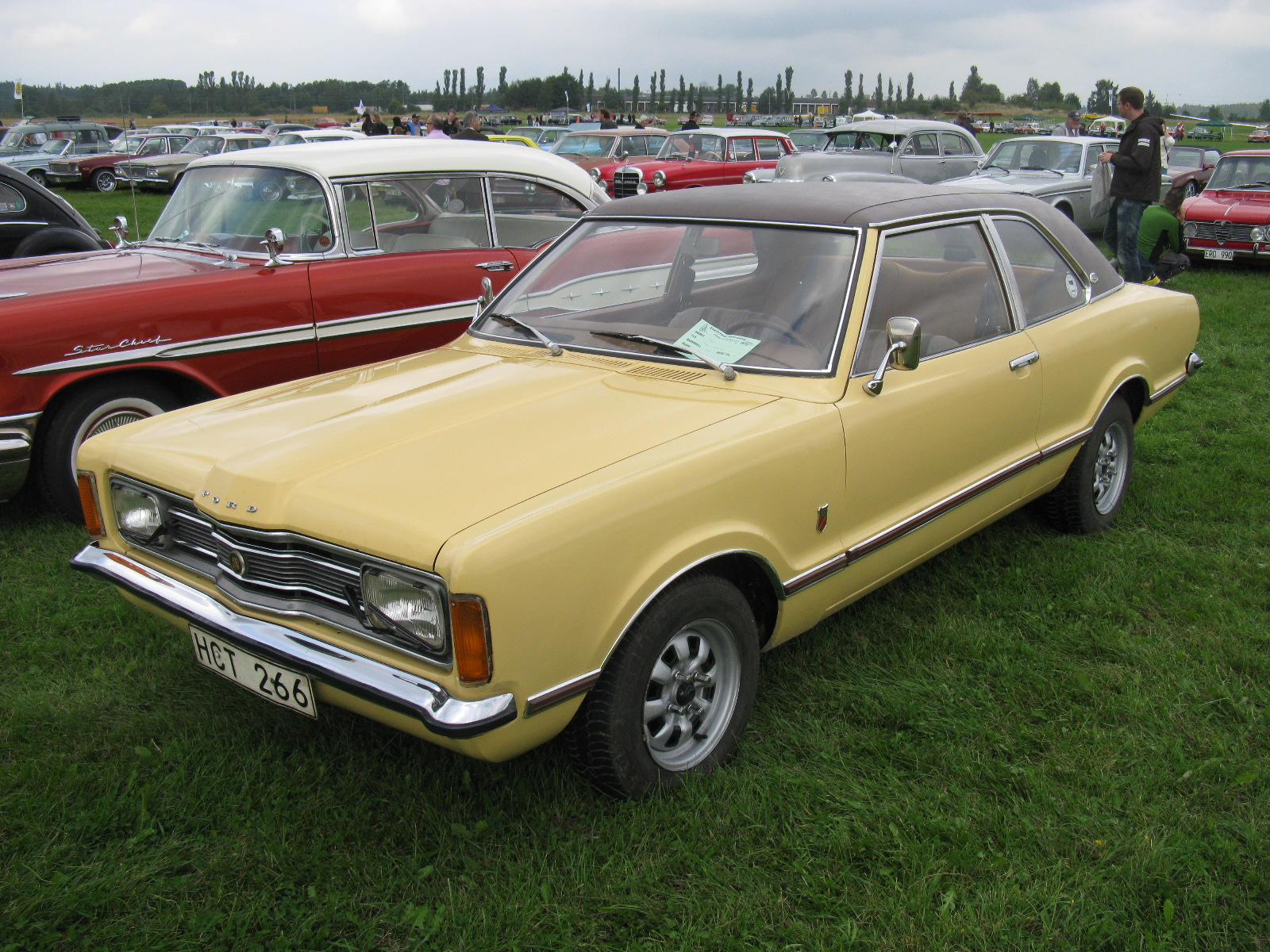
With sales slowing as the market anticipated a new model, Ford sought to sustain interest with a facelift in September 1973. From the outside the reworked front grille and the extra lights incorporated in it are the most obvious changes.

The Ford Taunus TC is a range of large family cars that were manufactured and marketed by Ford Germany across three generations from 1970 to 1982. The Taunus TC and Ford UK's Cortina range were rebadged variants of each other, the "TC" badge standing for Taunus Cortina. For all but the first generation (which had significant outer sheet metal differences), the two cars were identical apart from badging and trim.

== Taunus TC (1970–1975) ==
In September 1970, a new Taunus, the "Taunus Cortina" (TC), was introduced by Ford Germany. Ford offered a two or four door saloon and a five-door estate (identified as with previous Taunus estates, as the Taunus Turnier).

Between 1970 and 1975, when the Taunus TC gave way to the Taunus TC2, a fashionable fastback coupé was also included in the Ford Taunus range. Unlike in Britain, Ford Germany saw a niche in the market for a more "sensible" coupé model than the Capri, which also meant that care was taken to retain as much as possible of the saloon's luggage and rear seat accommodations.

=== Origins ===
The Ford Taunus TC series was conceived in the late 1960s to be a "world car" alongside its technical sibling the Cortina Mk III, with development and design work taking place on both sides of the Atlantic. The car was developed under the supervision of Semon E. "Bunkie" Knudsen, till February 1968 a high profile General Motors executive and from early 1968 till Autumn/Fall 1969 Ford's Dearborn-based chairman. The car is often nicknamed "Barock 2" (recalling the Taunus P2 series of the late 1950s, commonly known as the "Barock-Taunus") or "Knudsen-Taunus" in Germany, because of the prominent hood/bonnet scoop that, as the legend has it, was put there on direct order from Knudsen. Otherwise the major design work is rumoured to have been done by German car designer Luigi Colani, who later supplied design concepts for BMW's motorcycle division in the late 1970s.

The lower end of the market segment previously occupied in Germany by the Ford Taunus P6 being targeted, since 1968, by the smaller Escort, the Taunus TC was presented as a slightly upmarket replacement for the P6 which ceased production in August 1970. The 2,578 mm (101.5 in) wheelbase of the new car was 51 mm (2.0 in) longer than that of the P6 but the Taunus TC had shorter overhangs, so that overall it was slightly shorter. Nevertheless, it was noted that the TC appeared from the outside to be larger than it was, which many buyers appreciated. The interior was no longer free of a transmission tunnel, since with the Anglo-German design of the Taunus TC, Ford Germany abandoned, for the time being, front-wheel drive for this class of car, asserting that rear wheel drive was less expensive and simpler to produce and to maintain. (The obvious benchmark in the market place for the TC, the Opel Ascona, would also retain a "conventional" rear wheel drive configuration till 1981.)

=== Option packages ===
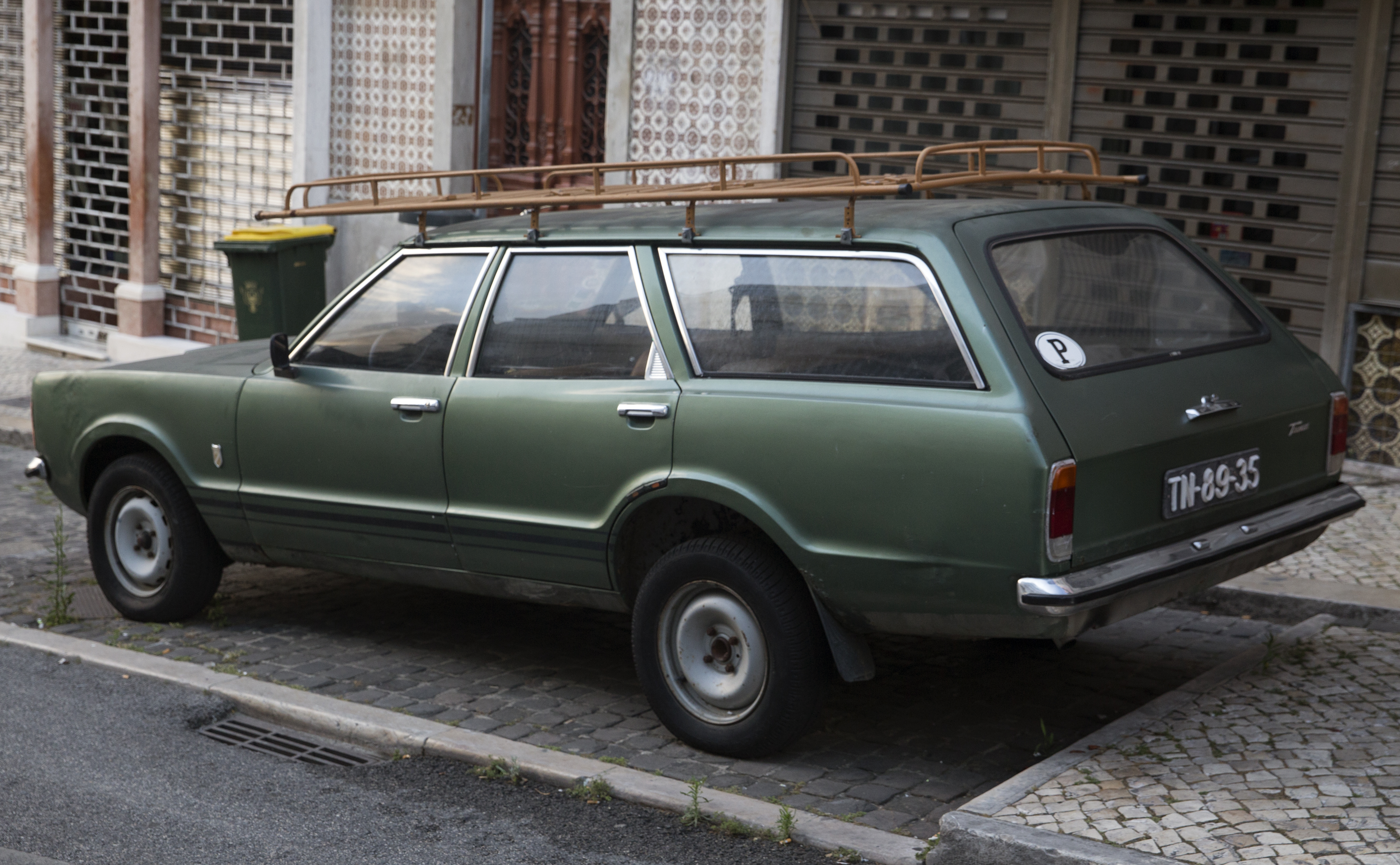
Ford Taunus Turnier (estate)

The standard Taunus was marketed as the "Taunus N", with progressively more extensive or sporty packages were identified in 1970 with the suffixes "L", "XL", "GT", and "GXL". The base version was not manufactured in large numbers, with most customers selecting higher trim levels. A similar approach with "options packages" was introduced in Germany by Opel at this time.

The L was a more comfortably equipped base version, with the XL adding certain luxuries such as height adjustable front seats, a clock, and larger headlights. The sporty GT (not available as a 1.3, as for the GXL) received bucket seats with built-in headrests, full instrumentation, a leather steering wheel, and twin headlamps amongst other equipment. Lastly, the top-of-the-line GXL added all the comforts of the XL with the sporty equipment of the GT and additional extras such as a vinyl roof, a dual-tone horn, and deeper carpeting.

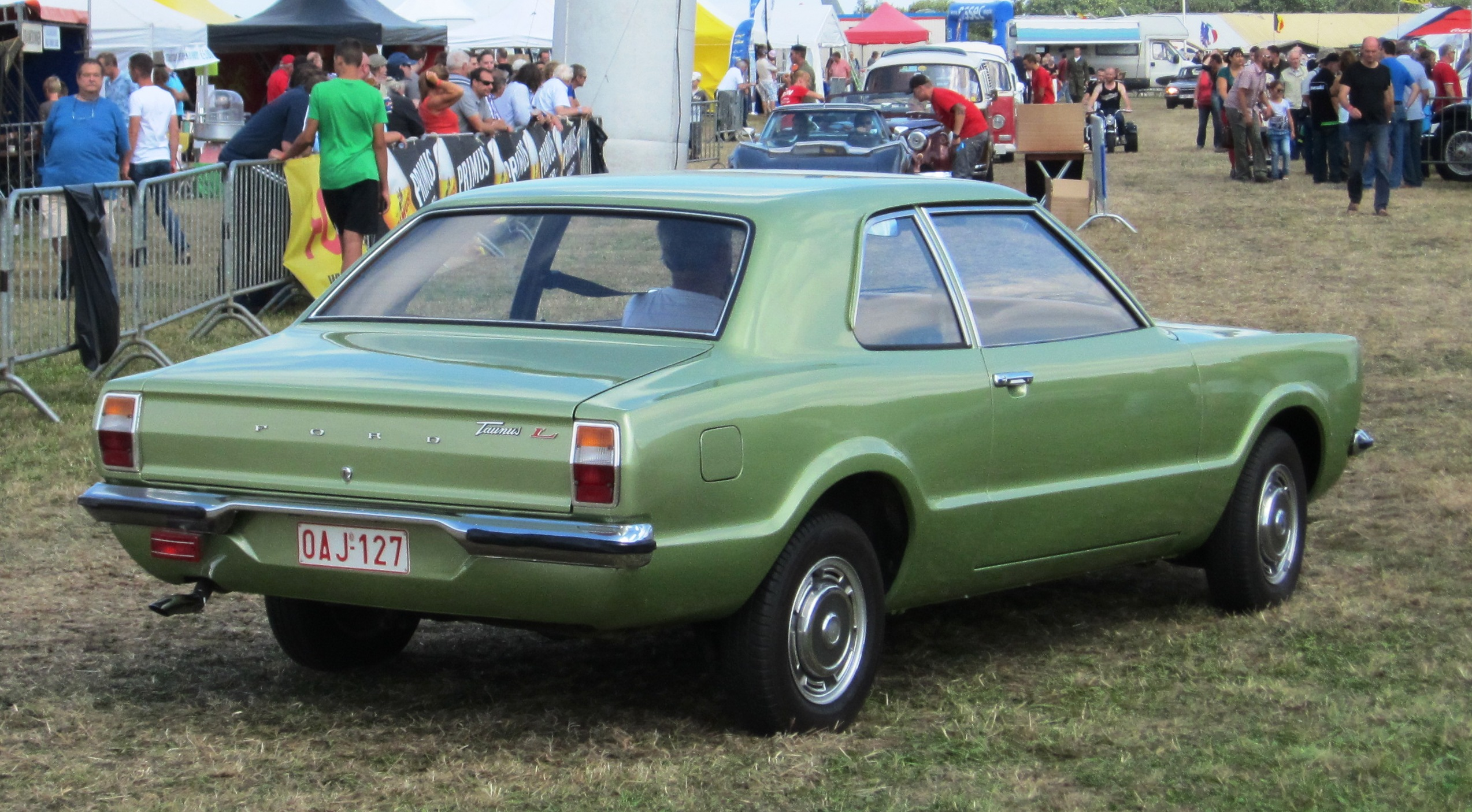
The view from behind

=== Cortina Mk III, UK ===
This model also formed the basis of the Cortina Mk III, but with different door skins and rear wing pressings from the "coke-bottle" styling of the Cortina. In addition, there was never a Cortina III equivalent to the fastback bodied Taunus TC coupé. The unification of Ford Europe's model range had started with the Escort and Capri and was continued (albeit to a lesser degree) with the Taunus and Cortina. The Taunus TC and Cortina Mk III were thus both developed under the auspices of Ford of Europe, and most major components, including the entire floorpan, were identical.

=== Technical progress ===
Significant advances were made with the rear suspension. The previous large Taunus had featured a rigid rear axle, suspended using traditional leaf-springs, but with the TC Ford used a rear suspension configuration involving coil springs, with the axle located using two longitudinal and two lateral linkages. The front wheels, no longer driven, were suspended with a conventional wishbone suspension, which eschewed shock absorbers and gave the car a soft 'freeway' ride and, with the heavier 6-cylinder engines, a tendency to excessive understeer. Press criticism of the trade-off between the car's road-holding and ride comfort soon evolved into a more general critique, not convincingly addressed by the manufacturer for several years, that Ford had launched the Taunus TC before they had finished developing it.

A telescopic steering column designed to collapse in the event of a frontal collision (rather than penetrate the driver's chest) had been mainstream in competitor models from Opel and Volkswagen for some time, and with the TC Ford now also incorporated this safety feature on their new mid-size range for Germany and mainland Europe.

=== Engines ===
Despite obvious US-management pressure to maximize commonality under the skin, the range of engines fitted on the Taunus TC differed from that on contemporary Cortinas in respect of the less powerful cars, and the UK company's venerable ohv Kent engine never found its way into the Belgian assembled Ford Germany version of the car. The rather lumpy V4 engine that had powered the Taunus P6 models in the 1960s (and which, in enlarged and more powerful form, would live on to power Ford Germany's Transit vans and full-size Granada model through much of the 1970s) was also passed over for the Taunus TC. The less powerful Taunus TCs were powered by a new four-cylinder OHC engine that was shared with the newly introduced American Ford Pinto and was offered, at this stage, with 1294 cc or 1593 cc: a 1993 cc version of the four-cylinder engine would be added from 1976 in the Taunus TC2. In the meantime, signalling a move away from the strategy followed with the Taunus P6, customers willing to pay for more power could now specify one of the compact V6 units carried over from the top range P7 models, the six-cylinder engines offering a choice between 1999 cc and 2294 cc engine displacements.

=== Transmission options ===
All the Taunus engines except the smallest 1.3-litre unit could be specified in combination with a Borg-Warner B35 three-speed automatic transmission in place of the standard four speed manual box.

=== 1973 facelift ===
The Taunus TC received its only significant facelift in September 1973. Through the 1960s rival manufacturer Opel had set the pace in terms of frequent model changes and facelifts, reflecting North American practice and the deep pockets of its General Motors parent. The mainstream German owned automakers that had survived till 1970 had not attempted to follow Opel down this path, but Ford had settled into a pattern of generally four-year model changes. From production statistics between 1970 and 1973 the Taunus TC was evidently a commercial success, but in 1974 sales were dipping alarmingly, as customers waited for a new Ford Taunus. A new Taunus was not yet ready for launch, but in September 1973 the existing model received a facelift with various changes in respect of trim package and engine combinations. The Taunus TC also received a new grille, now incorporating a second pair of front lights: rectangular headlights, reflecting contemporary styling trends, but hitherto restricted to the "XL" (and more exalted) trim packages, now became standard across the Taunus range. The other major change was to the interior, with the steeply sloping and highly stylised dashboard of the original car replaced by a more angular and plainer design but with much improved ergonomics – this fascia would stay with the Taunus into the TC2 and TC3 versions. Ford Germany's Taunus output, which had slumped from 245,955 cars in 1973 to 138,357 in 1974, recovered to 181,530 in 1975.

On manual transmission 1593 cc four-cylinder engined cars September 1973 also saw small changes to the gear ratios for second and third gear. At this time lateral stabilizer bars were also fitted front and back which provided a belated answer to widespread criticism of the original car's propensity to wallow when changing direction or driving on irregular road surfaces.

=== Commercial ===
Ford Taunus TC production (units):

- 1970 59,821
- 1971 253,283
- 1972 233,366
- 1973 245,955
- 1974 138,357
- 1975 181,530 (from end Nov, TC2)

This data covers the Ford Taunus TC cars produced by Ford Germany. It does not include Ford Cortinas which were assembled in Dagenham

The Ford Taunus TC was more visually striking that its predecessor and was welcomed on account of its good looks. Overall evaluation of the car's commercial success should perhaps combine data for both the Taunus TC and the Cortina Mk III which got off to a slow start thanks to a lengthy plant shut down resulting from a succession of strikes in 1970. Nevertheless, separating out figures for the Ford Taunus TC, produced under the auspices of Ford Germany at their Belgian plant, an hour down the road from their German head office, approximately 250,000 cars were produced during each of the three years 1971, 1972 and 1973, and in each of these years the Taunus TC was Ford Germany's top seller. Year by year output data for the rival Opel Ascona have not been located, but between 1970 and 1975 Opel produced 691,438 Ascona As, confirming that during its first three full years of production the Taunus TC was in the till now unusual position, for a German Ford, of outselling its Opel rival.

World auto sales were badly hit by the 1973 oil crisis. Ford Germany output in 1974 was down by slightly under 40% on the previous year. (Opel output was down by 33% over the same period.) Even in 1974 the Taunus was Ford Germany's top model, beating the smaller cheaper Escort if only by a small margin. In 1975 Taunus output recovered to 181,530, although by now the Taunus was no longer Ford Germany's top performer, with 215,760 Escorts produced by Ford German in 1975, the Escort having belatedly gained wider appeal with German buyers, following the launch in December 1974 of the less cramped Mk II version.

== Taunus TC2 (1976–1979) ==
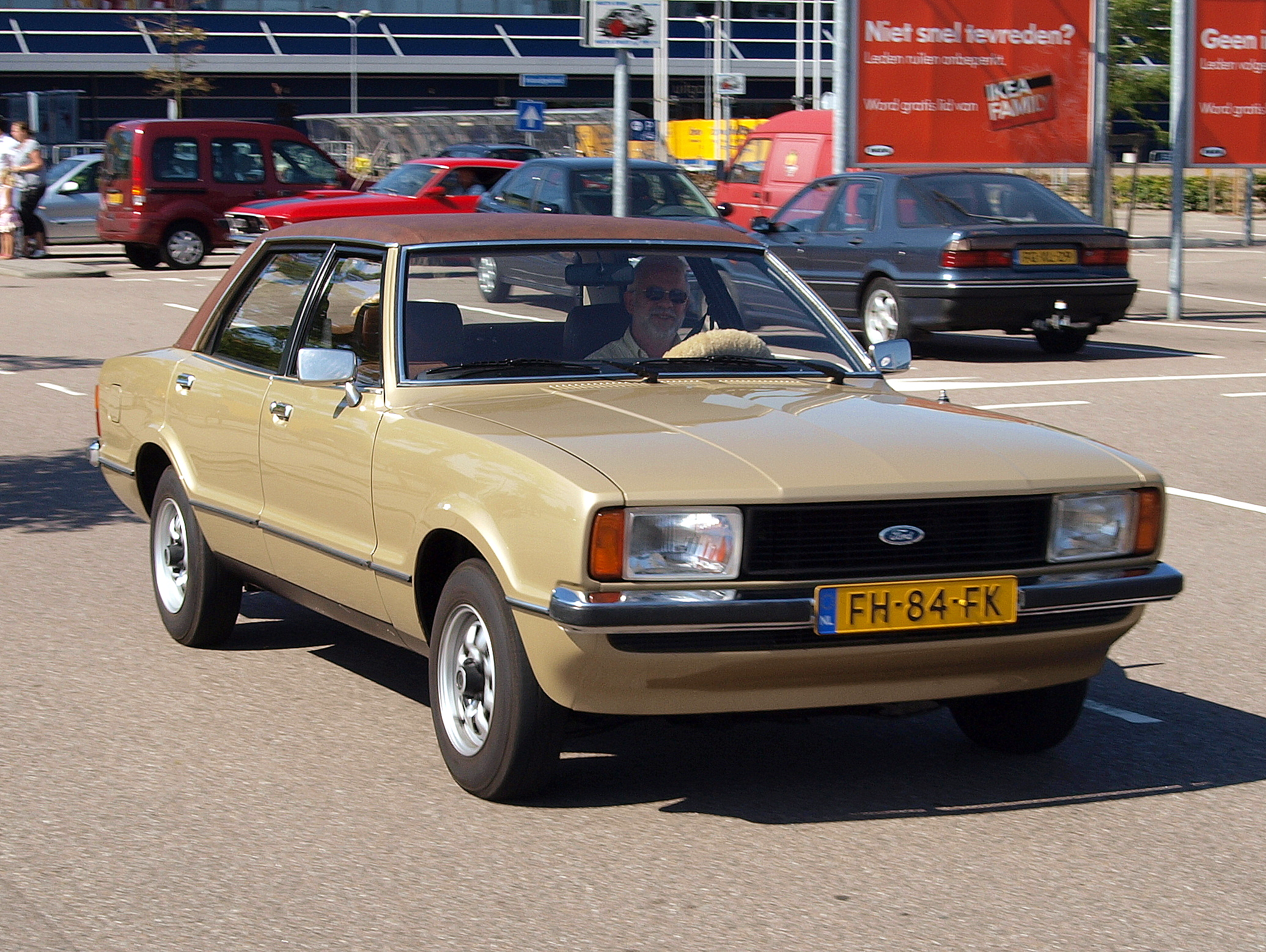
Ford Taunus TC2 4-door (1976–1979)

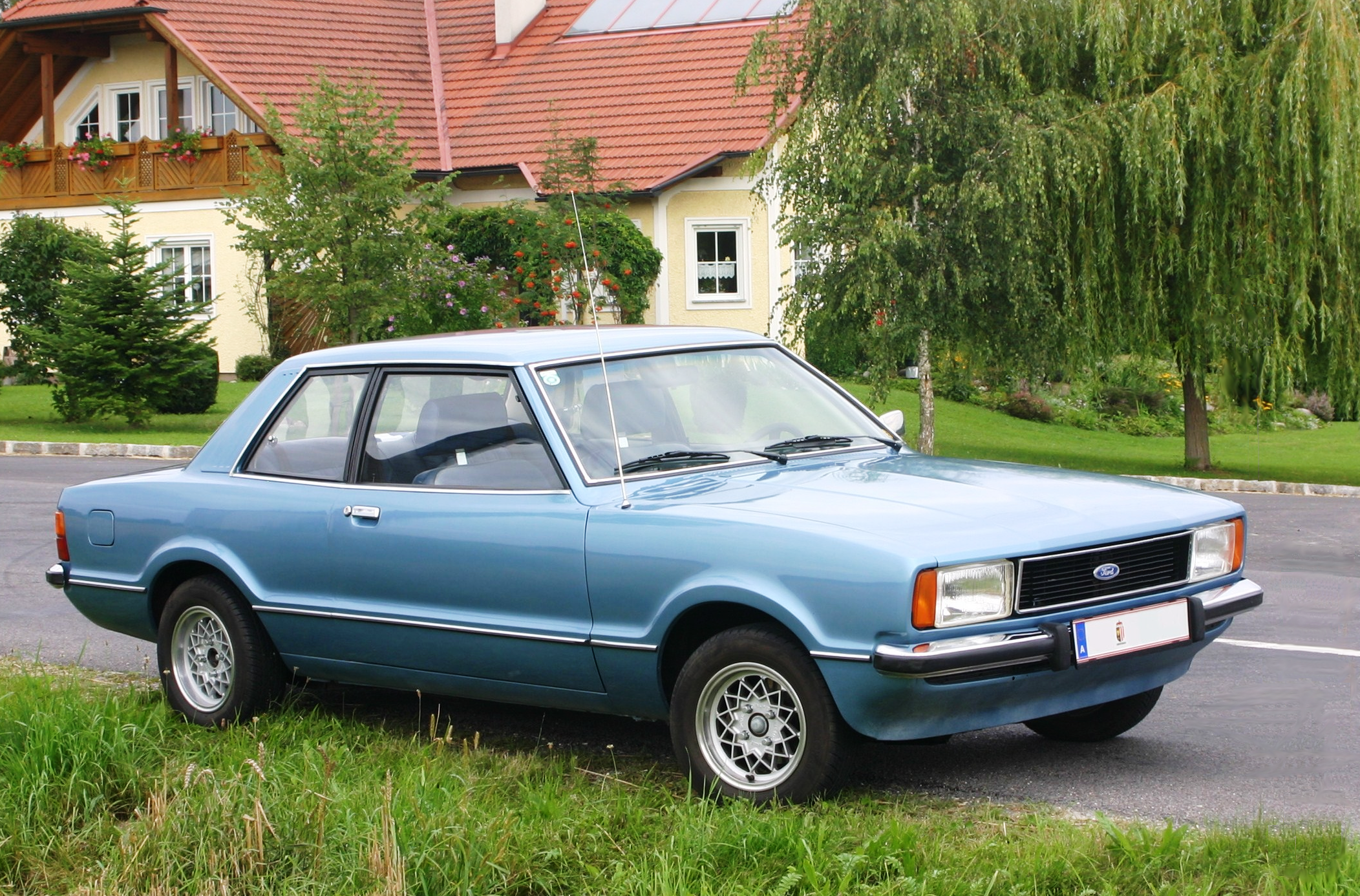
Ford Taunus TC2 2-door (1976–1979)

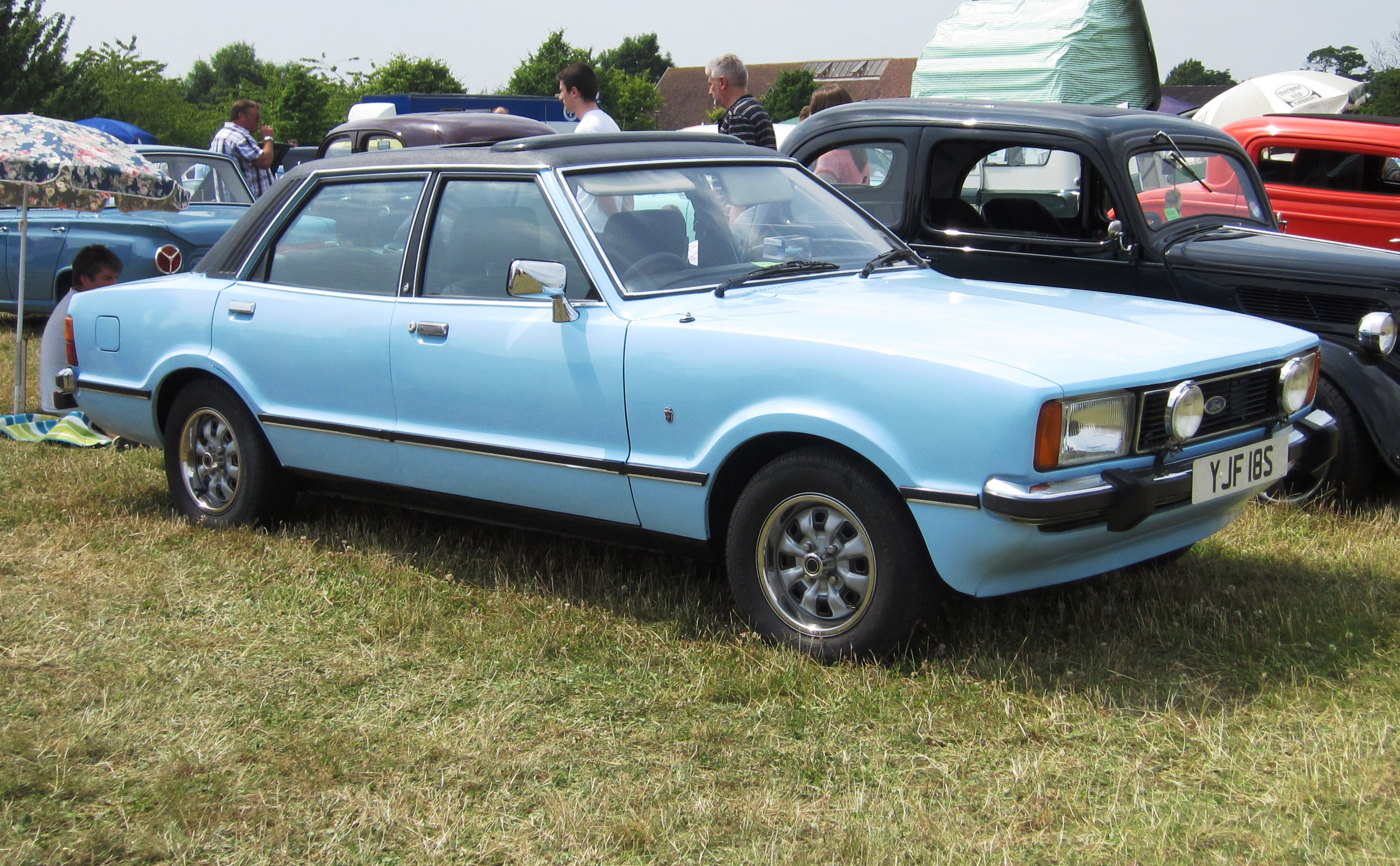
Ford Cortina Mk IV 4-door (1976–1979): after 1976 the Fords Taunus and Cortina were virtually identical.

At the end of November 1975, in time for the 1976 model year, production began of the Taunus series "GBTS", also known as the "Ford Taunus TC2".

=== Cortina comparisons ===
Ford of Britain continued to sell the Cortina Mark III, the Dagenham produced version of the earlier Taunus TC, for more than half a year following the launch of the Taunus TC2, but in September 1976 the Cortina Mark IV was introduced in Britain, after which the Taunus TC2 and Cortina Mk IV were almost identical, apart from regional variations in terms of specification changes and trim levels. Internally, they were for the most part differentiated by the driving position: LHD (left-hand drive) cars were badged Taunus while RHD (right-hand drive) cars were badged Cortina, generally regardless of the country of assembly. However, where the German "Ford Taunus" name had no significant positive presence the "Ford Cortina" name was used in certain smaller LHD markets such as Greece, South Korea, Philippines, Israel (which took most of its LHD cars as Cortinas, sourced from the UK plant, till 1981) and Taiwan.

The Taunus TC2 was essentially a "reskin" of the Taunus TC, and was in most markets presented as such. For Ford's Cortina buyers the reskin was a little more extensive, with the loss of the "coke-bottle" line which distinguished the Cortina Mk III from the 1976 Mk IV model, and promotional material in respect of the Cortina played up the differences between the Cortinas Mark III and IV.

=== Updated bodywork ===
The Taunus TC2 retained an overall silhouette very similar to that of the Taunus TC, though actually all the principal outer body panels were newly shaped as were the rear window and side windows. Parking became a little easier now that the rear corners of the car were visible from the driver's seat. From outside the car the most obvious change was the loss at the front of the "Knudsen Nose" which made for a less eye-catchingly individualistic look, but resulted in a more harmonious body shape.

=== Under the TC2 "reskin" little changed ===
The suspension setup was unchanged from that on the Taunus TC (as improved in September 1973). The twin circuit hydraulic braking system still operated on disc brakes at the front and drum brakes at the rear, their diameters unchanged. However, where in 1970 a buyer of the entry level 1294 cc would have found a brake servo only on the options list, servo-assisted brakes for the Taunus TC2 were standard across the range. On the six-cylinder cars, which had heavier engine blocks, it also became possible from August 1977 to specify as an option power assisted steering.

The range of engine sizes was the same apart from one important addition: buyers could specify an enlarged 1993 cc version of the "Pinto" OHC engine. It was therefore now possible to buy a 2-litre Taunus with either 4 or 6 cylinders. The four-cylinder powered car came with an advertised maximum output of 98 PS (72 kW; 97 hp) while the six-cylinder version offered only 90 PS (66 kW; 89 hp). The more recently designed four-cylinder unit also came with more torque. Nevertheless, the six-cylinder car achieved its maxima at lower engine speeds and some commentators found it more relaxing to drive.

There were few changes to the interior of the TC2, since the dashboard, instrumentation and switchgear had already been redesigned for the 1974 model year version of the TC1 just two years earlier, although there were new steering wheel designs and updated trim materials.

As before, all but the 1294 cc-engined car could be ordered, at extra cost, with a three-speed automatic transmission. The automatic box offered was no longer a Borg Warner system, but Ford's own C3 transmission produced at the manufacturer's transmission plant in Bordeaux which had opened in 1973.

=== Commercial (TC2/TC3) ===
Ford Taunus TC production (units):

- 1975 181,530 (from end Nov, TC2)
- 1976 284,527
- 1977 285,384
- 1978 264,774
- 1979 256,884 (from Sep, TC3)
- 1980 173,295
- 1981 201,409
- 1982 117,426

This data covers the Ford Taunus TC2 and TC3 produced by Ford Germany. It does not include Ford Cortinas which were assembled in Dagenham

Since 1970 the Taunus TC had competed head-on for market-share with the Opel Ascona, and in 1973 the two were joined in what was now a three-way tussle by the Volkswagen Passat. Strictly comparable production data for the three cars are not easily accessible, but if one leaves out Opels assembled in Britain as Vauxhall Cavaliers, then in volume terms the three-way tussle was narrowly won between 1976 and 1982 by the Ford Taunus TC2/TC3, with 1,583,699 cars produced. Between 1975 and 1981 Opel produced 1,316,459 Ascona Bs. The Opel figures would rise above those for the Taunus if one added the 196,512 Vauxhall Cavaliers built, on behalf of Vauxhall at Opel's Antwerp plant, and be boosted further if one added the 534,634 mechanically similar Opel Mantas that shared the Ascona's production line. During the six years between 1976 and 1982 Volkswagen produced 1,360,312 Passats. To make the Volkswagen group the convincing winner in this contest it would be necessary to add the 1,290,164 mechanically similar Audi 80s to the figure given here for the Volkswagen Passat. Despite its strong performance in the market place, by 1980, with new contenders from Volkswagen and Opel arriving, the output data suggest that the age of the Taunus TC's basic design was beginning to count against it.

In a sector which gained in significance during the increasingly cash-strapped 1970s, as many buyers traded down from larger cars such as the Opel Rekord, the Taunus TC2/TC3 (like the TC before it) achieved market place success through a combination of good looks and aggressive pricing. The mechanically conservative car was widely regarded as dependable, despite never entirely ridding itself of irritating defects and weaknesses which a more rigorous development process should have prevented.

== Taunus TC3 (1979–1982) ==
When, in 1979, the Taunus TC3 (also known as the Taunus series "GBFS") replaced the Taunus TC2 the major components remained basically the same. In the UK Ford presented the facelifted car as the "Cortina Model 80", although it quickly became known, if only informally, as the Cortina Mk 5. Again, the 1979 differences tended to be played up more in respect of the Cortina badged car assembled in Dagenham than in respect of Ford Germany's Belgian assembled Taunus badged cars.

Innovations in the engine compartment with the 1979 TC3 model included a new "Economy carburetor", manufactured in-house by Ford, which gave rise to many complaints. Minor bodywork modifications affected the base of the side windows which was very slightly lowered. Other changes visible from the outside included bumpers that now wrapped round along the sides of the car as far as the wheel arches. The roofline became slightly higher on 2-door and 4-door saloons. The rear light clusters were made substantially larger and adopted the same 'sawtooth' design being rolled out across the Ford range and also wrapped around the corners of the car sufficiently to be visible from the sides. There were only minor detail changes to the interior, with the dashboard remaining largely the same, but with centre air vents taking up the former position of the radio, which was moved down to an extended centre console.

At the top of the range the choice of 2.3-litre engined cars was reduced with the delisting of the Ford Taunus Sport, but across the range it now became possible to specify an "S" options package which in essence comprised a stronger antiroll bar and firmer suspension.

=== The end of European production ===
In July 1982 European production of the Taunus TC3/Cortina 80 ceased; it was replaced in October by the Ford Sierra. The Sierra carried over the Cortina/Taunus OHC Pinto engines and "conventional" rear-wheel drive configuration but was otherwise an all new car with independent suspension all round.

Taunus production continued in Argentina until 1984. Here the fastback coupé version, discontinued from the European model line-up in 1975, remained in the Taunus range right until the end. South Africa also produced the TC3 until 1984 (although badged as "Cortina", as with the UK market version), with the P100 pickup version remaining in production in that country until 1987 when it was replaced by a Sierra-bodied equivalent.

Taunus production also continued at Otosan in Turkey, where a version of the TC3 with remoulded ends continued in production until 1994.

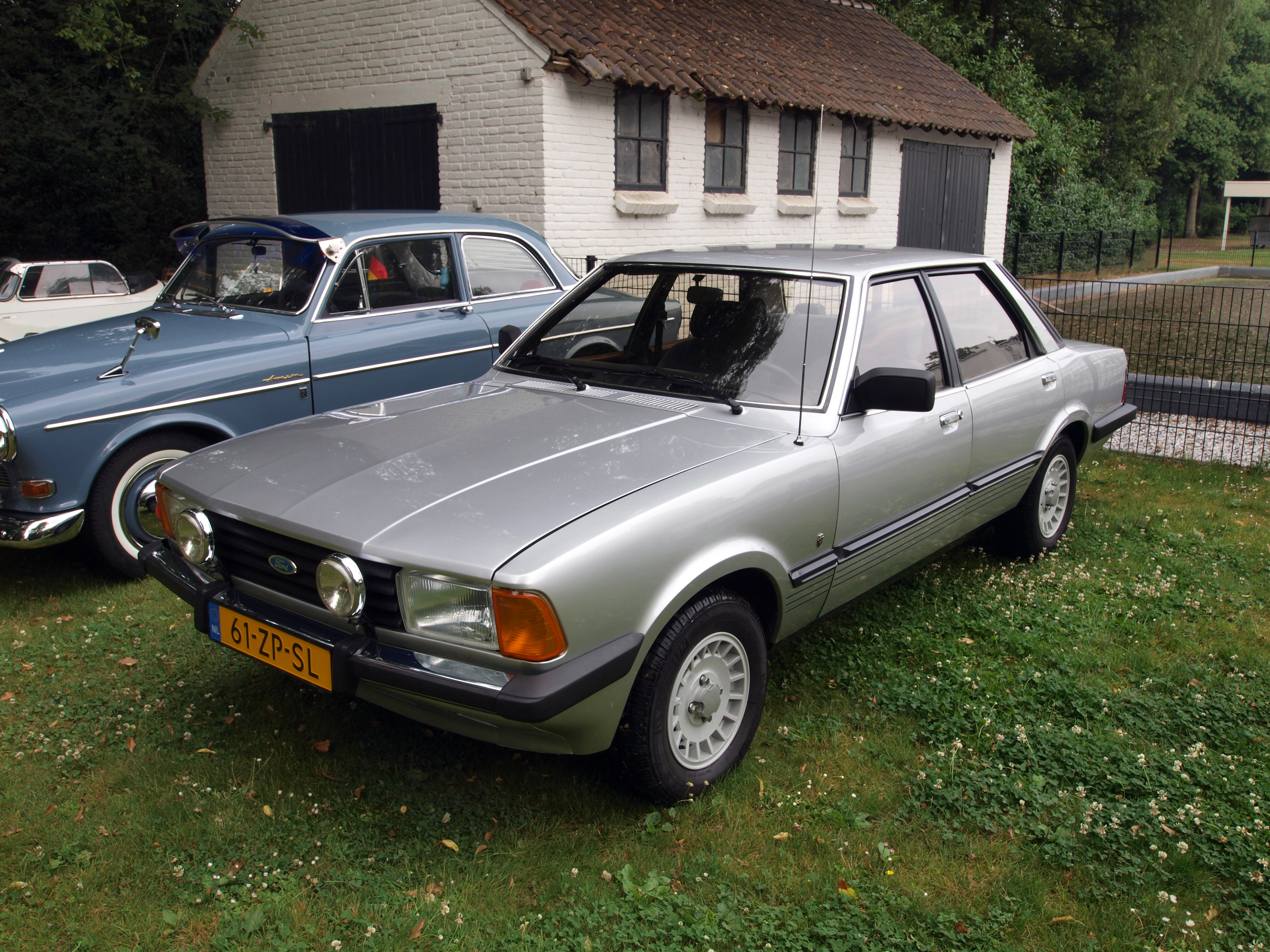
Ford Taunus Ghia TC3 4-door (1979–1982)

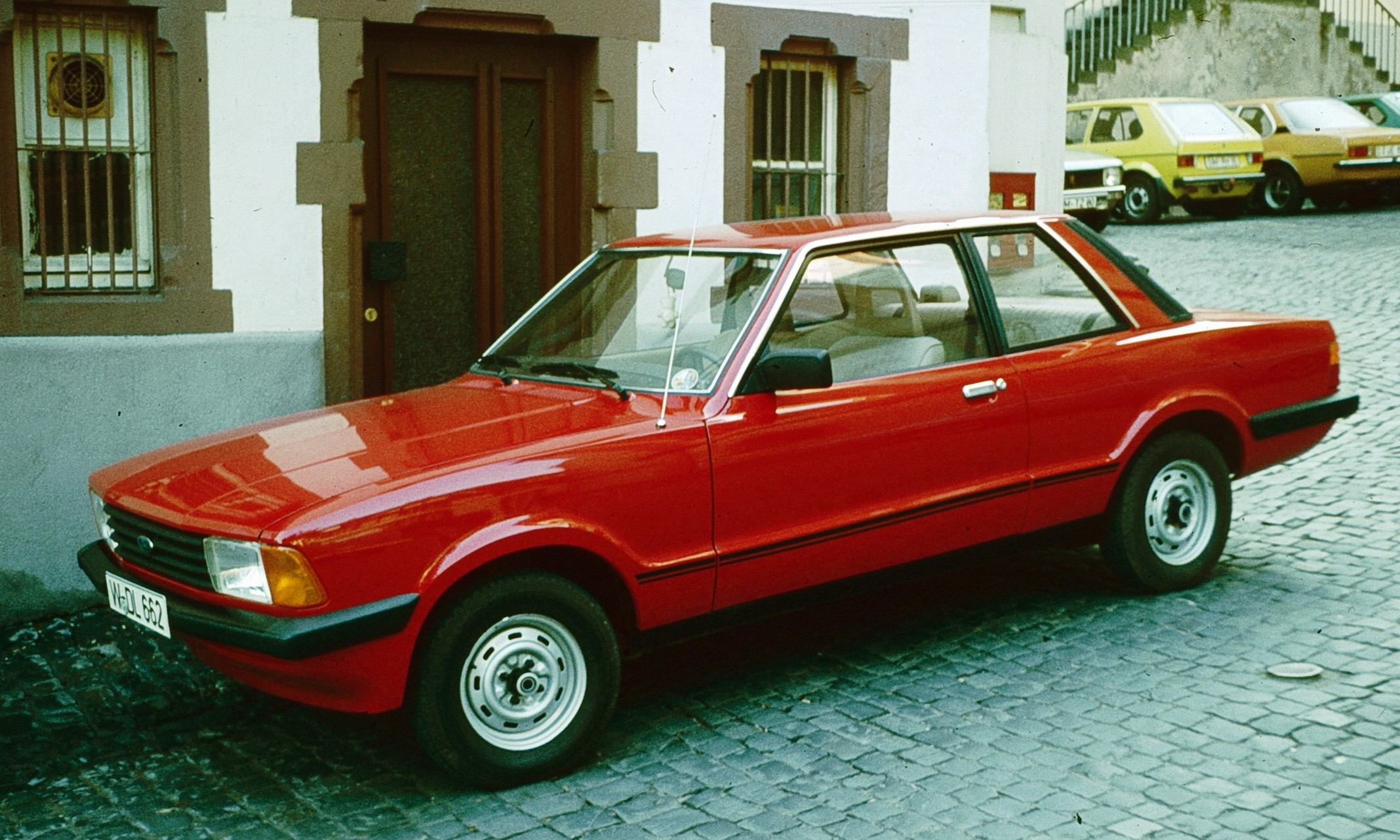
Ford Taunus TC3 2-door (1979–1982)

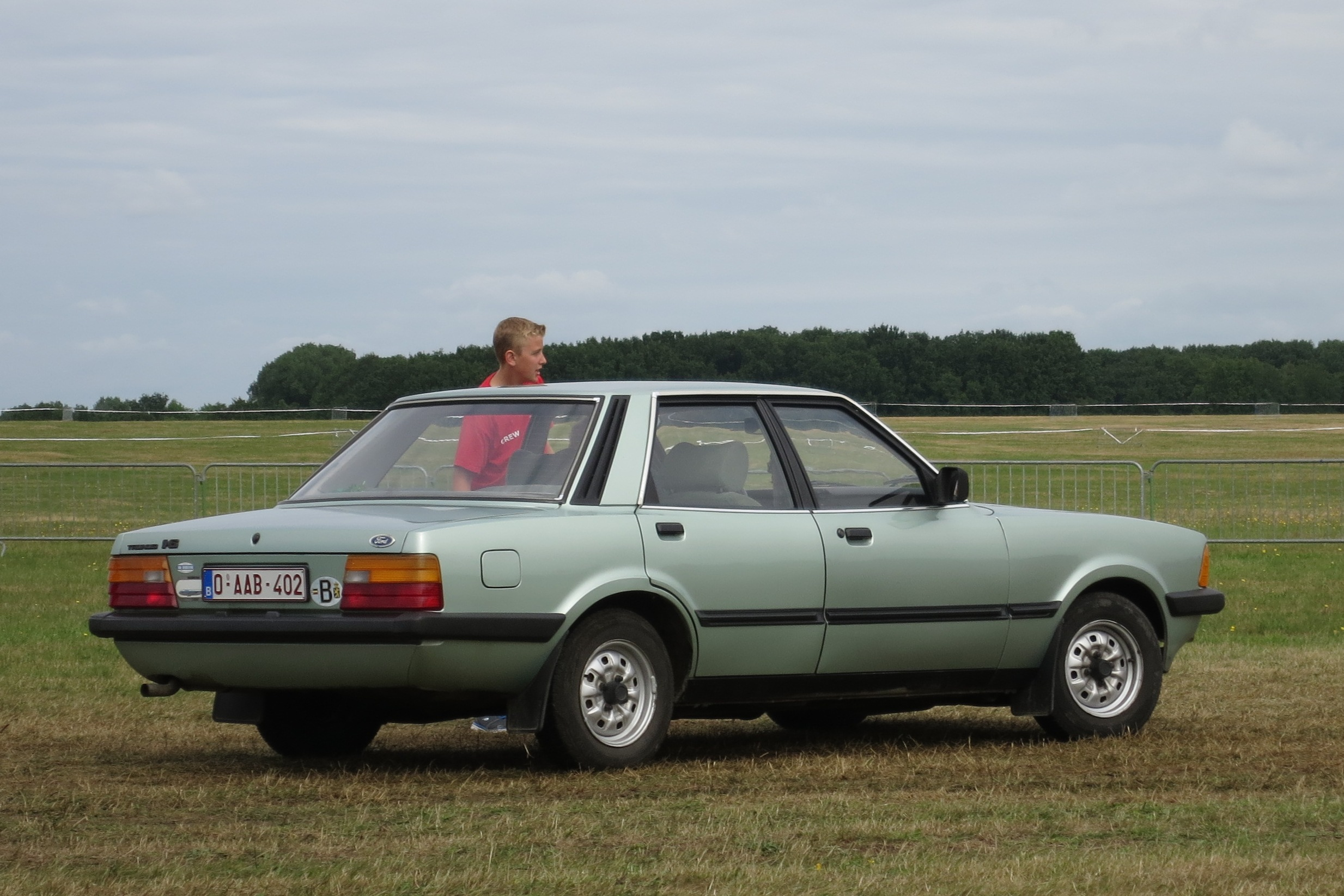
Ford Taunus TC3 4-door, highlighting the enlarged rear lights

== Production in Argentina and Turkey ==
The Taunus TC was produced in Argentina from 1974 up until the end of 1984 and in Turkey, by Otosan, from 1984 till 1994.

=== Argentina ===
Before the launch of Argentinian production, the Taunus TC1 underwent a year of testing. Various critical chassis components were replaced with more robust equivalents due to the harsher roads of rural Argentina. Other components were re-sourced locally for reasons of availability, but most components for the Argentinian assembled cars still had to be imported from European Ford plants. One of the most significant technical differences is that the Argentine Taunus cars use Dana "Type 30" rear axles rather than the Atlas or Salisbury (according to engine size/torque) rear axles used by the European Taunus/Cortina.

The Argentine models produced from 1974 were the "TC1" in four-door saloon versions (2000L, 2000GXL and 2300GXL) and the two-door fastback coupé (2300GT and 2300GT/SP) from 1974 to 1980. No Taunus TC estates or two-door saloons were produced in South America.

The "TC2" (1976–1979) Taunus/Cortina was never produced in Argentina. Production switched directly in 1980 from the Taunus TC to the "TC3"/"Cortina 80". Both saloon (2.0 L, 2.3 Ghia and 2.3 Ghia S) and Coupé (2.3 GT, 2.3 SP and 2.3 SP5) were produced, though again the estate-bodied cars and the two-door saloons were excluded from the Argentinian line-up. As part of the 1980 upgrade, Ford introduced a face-lifted version of the "TC1" fastback coupé, since 1975 produced only in Argentina, featuring the TC3 nose and its own unique taillights layout. These post-1980 Argentine Taunus fastback coupés also featured improved performance and a refashioned interior: they used the name "Taunus SP" or "Taunus SP 5", the "5" referring to the five-speed manual gearbox now available as an option. Apart from the five-speed option, the transmission choice, as for the European Taunus TCs, lay between a four-speed manual and, for larger engined cars, a three-speed automatic gearbox.

The Argentine Taunus TC models did not share the European engine range, instead using the similar "Lima" engine — for Argentina with 2.0 as well as 2.3 litres displacement. This was derived from the "Pinto" engine but differed in several respects. The most powerful engine available in the Argentine Taunus was an updated version of the "Lima" with an upgraded camshaft, new exhaust headers and a twin barrel 36/36mm Solex carburetor. None of the Argentine Taunus models came with six-cylinder engines.

In total, 197,031 Taunus were built in Argentina.

Even though the Taunus/Cortina is not a usual sight any more in European countries where it used to be a bestseller, plenty of the cars survive in Argentina, where a number of Clubs keep the cars in top condition, while many are still used as for regular family transport, especially in rural areas, such as the Club Taunus Argentina

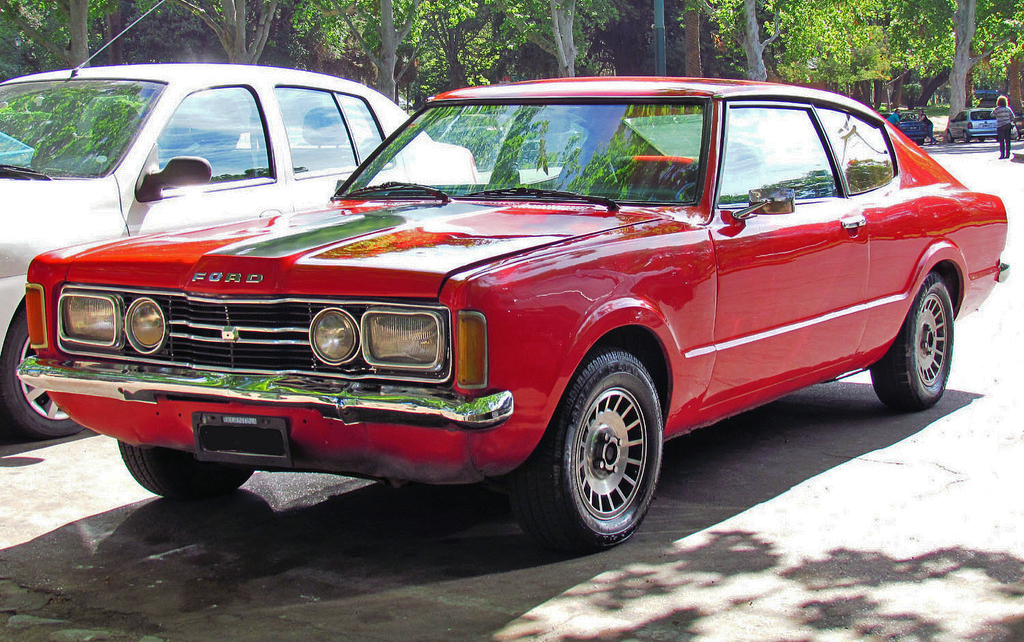
The Argentina-exclusive Taunus 2300 GT fastback coupé, built from 1974 up until the end of 1984.

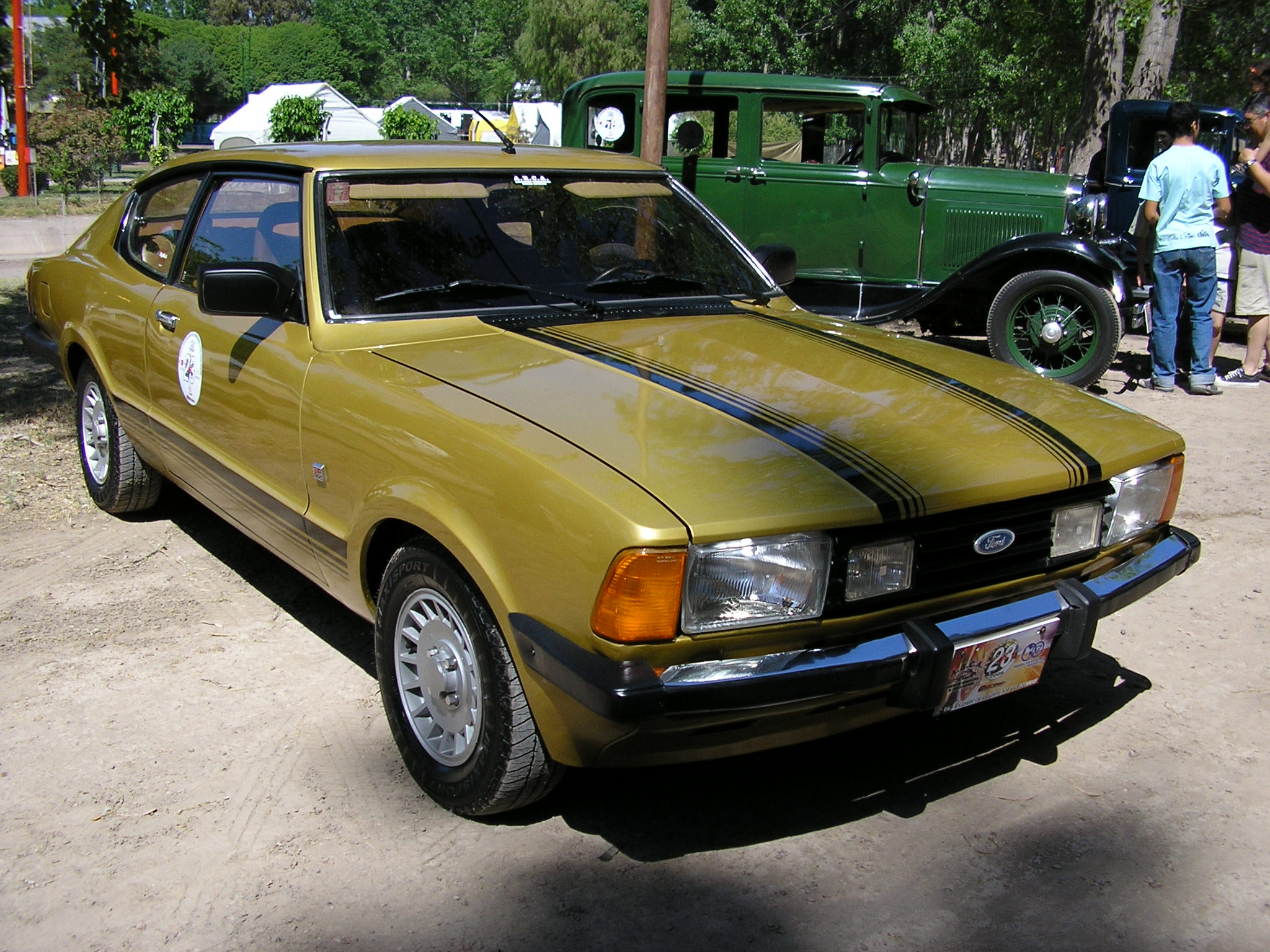
Ford Taunus Coupé SP.

=== Turkey ===
In 1984 the Argentinian Taunus production line was sold to Ford Otosan in Turkey where the manufacture of the Otosan Taunus now took place. The Otosan factory also created a truck version called the P100. There had previously been a South African-built Cortina Mk V-based Ford P100 pickup truck, but the Otosan design is entirely different. Based on the Taunus rather than the Cortina, it also did not use the South African load-bed structure, preferring their own design which featured foldable sides (reminiscent of the Peugeot U10) and it used the shorter front doors from the four-door body.

The Otosan Taunus was also differentiated from Taunus TC3s previously built in Europe and Argentina by its distinctive sculpted front panel with rectangular or dual square headlights and a colour matched grille.

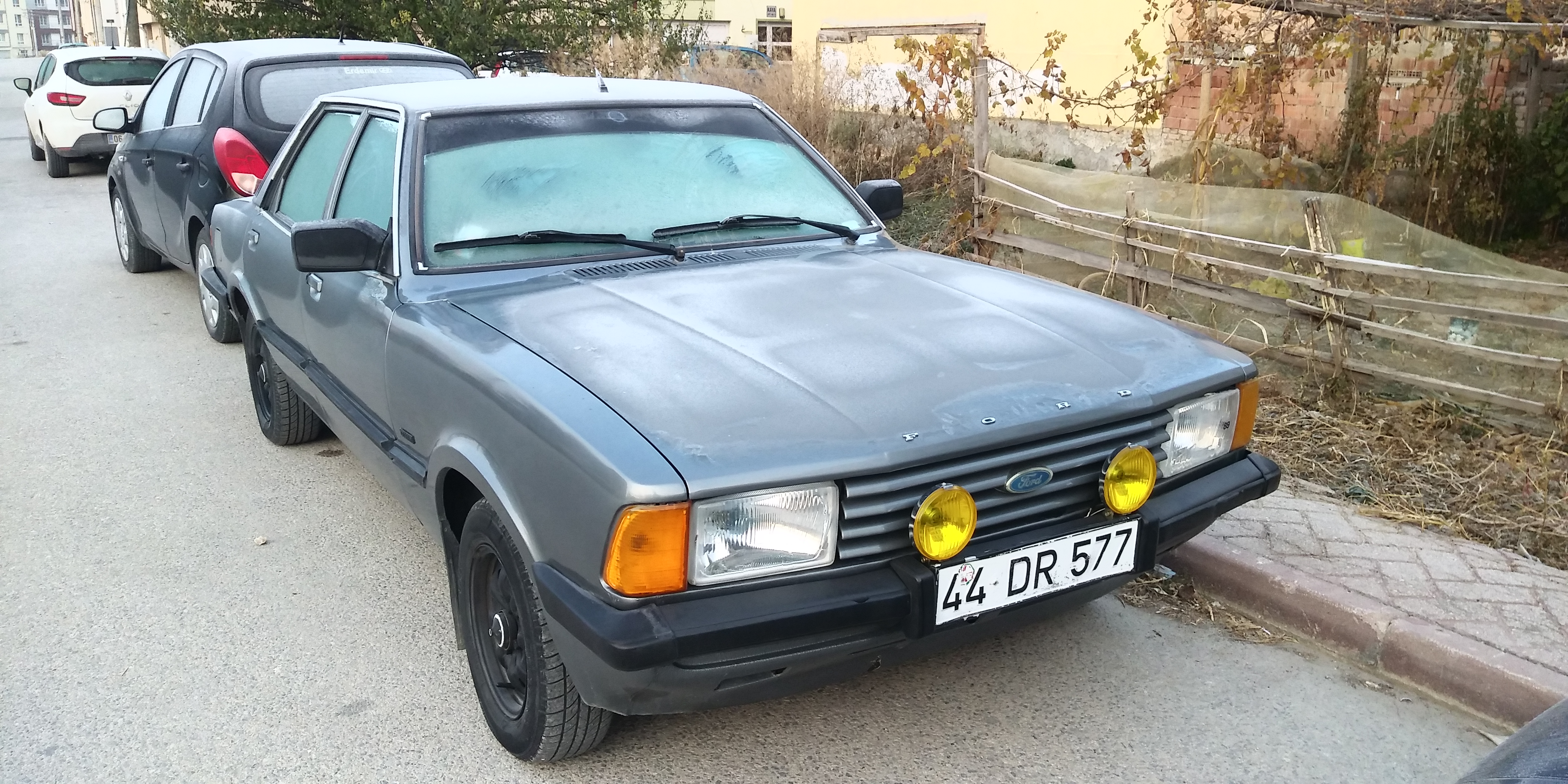
An early model of Otosan's Ford Taunus, which had similar trim to the European versions.

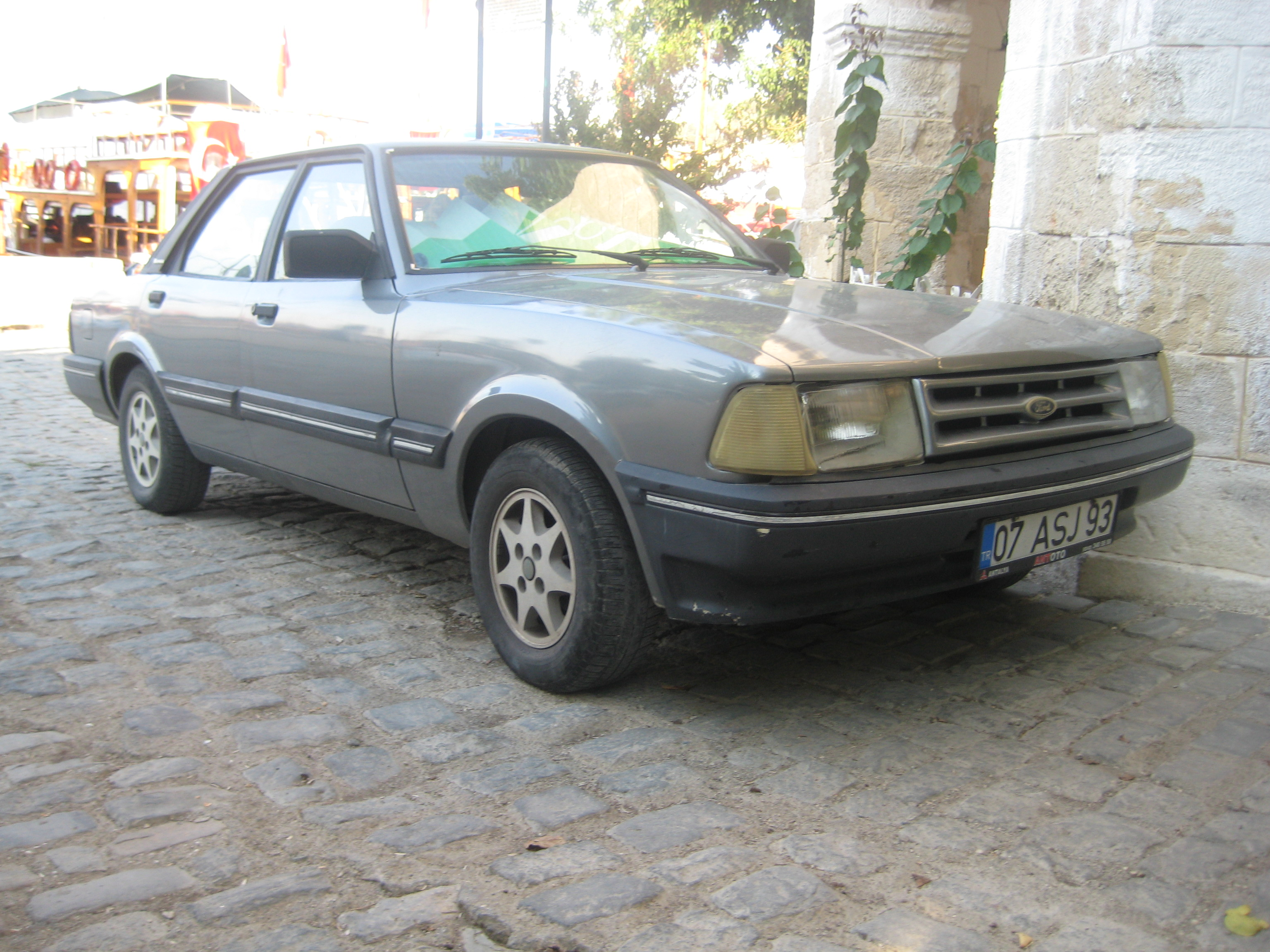
Post-facelift Ford Taunus, produced in Turkey until 1994.
