= Ford Otosan =

Automotive manufacturing company

Coordinates: 40°43′24″N 29°51′11″E

Ford Otomotiv Sanayi A.Ş.
- Type: Public
- Traded as: BİST: FROTO
- Industry: Automotive
- Founded: 1959; 67 years ago
- Headquarters: Gölcük, Kocaeli Province, Turkey
- Area served: Worldwide
- Key people: Rahmi Koç (president)
- Products: Automobiles, light commercial vehicles, trucks
- Production output: ▲934,500 vehicles (2024)
- Revenue: ▲US$17.24 billion (2024)
- Operating income: ▼US$840 million (2024)
- Net income: ▼US$1.12 billion (2024)
- Total assets: ▲US$9.47 billion (2024)
- Total equity: ▲US$3.33 billion (2024)
- Owners: Ford (41%); Koç Holding (41%); Public float (18%)
- Number of employees: 23.701 (2023)
- Website: fordotosan.com.tr

Ford Otomotiv Sanayi A.Ş. (Turkish for 'Ford Automotive Industry'), doing business as Ford Otosan, is an automotive manufacturing company based in Turkey that is equally owned by Ford Motor Company and Koç Holding. The company was established in its current form in 1977, with original relations dating back to 1928. It currently operates in six locations: Gölcük and Yeniköy plants in Kocaeli, İnönü plant in Eskişehir, Craiova plant in Romania, Sancaktepe R&D Center and spare parts warehouse in Istanbul. The company employs more than 20,000 people and had a production capacity of over 934,500 vehicles, 430,000 engines, and 112,000 powertrains by 2024.

== History ==
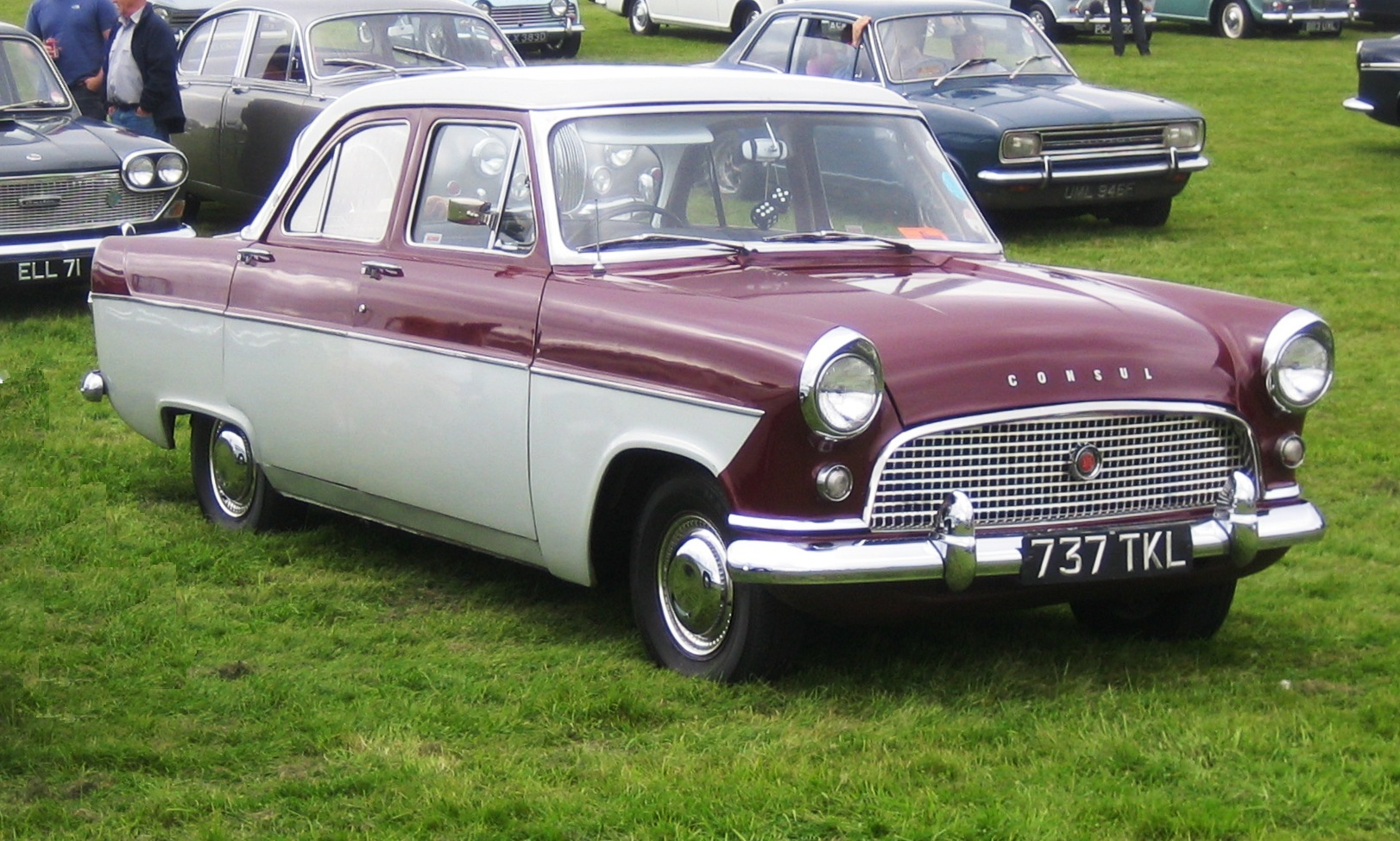
Ford Consul Mk II

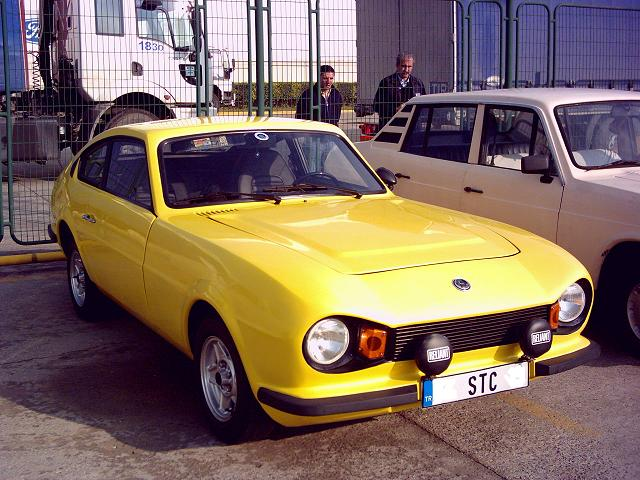
Anadol STC-16

The collaboration began in 1928, when Vehbi Koç was assigned as a Ford dealer in Ankara. The following year, the Turkish national assembly granted Ford the right to install a local assembly plant in a free zone located in Tophane, Istanbul's port area. Coinciding with Great Depression of 1929, limited numbers of Ford Model A and Ford Model B vehicles were assembled in Tophane Plant of Ford Motor Company Exports Inc. until 1934, when vehicle assembly activities were suspended.

In 1959, the foundation of the Otosan (Otomotiv Sanayii, Turkish for 'Automotive Industry') factory was held in Istanbul, and in 1960 the Ford Consul was the first model to be produced at the plant, followed by the Thames and the Thames Trader van. In 1965, the D1210 truck was added to production, and in 1966, the Anadol, the first mass-production passenger vehicle developed in Turkey. In 1967, the Ford Transit also began production and in 1973, the Anadol STC-16, the first sports car developed in Turkey.

In 1977, the company signed a license agreement with Ford and the company's name was changed to Ford Otosan. In 1979, a new factory was opened in İnönü, Eskişehir, which began the production of the Ford Cargo in 1983. Also that year, Ford increased its share of ownership in the company to 30 percent. In 1985 the Ford Taunus began production at the Istanbul plant, and in 1986 the official opening ceremony was held for the İnönü engine plant.

In 1992, the newer Ford Transit was put into production, and in 1993 the Ford Escort replaced the Ford Taunus on the production lines. In 1997, Ford further increased its share in the company to 41 percent, becoming equal partner with Koç Holding in the joint venture. In 1998, a new factory in Gölcük, Kocaeli, that became operational in 2001, replaced the Istanbul facility. It is aimed mainly at commercial vehicle production, and manufactures the Ford Transit and the Ford Transit Connect, both models being marketed worldwide. In 2003, the company launched a new generation of the Ford Cargo heavy-duty truck.

In September 2012, Ford revealed its new version of the Transit, and in January 2013, the new Cargo heavy truck was unveiled. The latter was co-developed by Ford Otosan in partnership with Ford Brazil, and will be manufactured in both countries.

In September 2018, at the IAA Commercial Vehicles show in Hannover, Germany, Ford introduced an electric tractor trailer concept vehicle dubbed the F-Vision, which would have Level 4 autonomous driving capability.

In March 2022, Ford Otosan announced that company would acquire Ford Romania. Ford Otosan took over the ownership of Ford Romania's Craiova factory from Ford Motor Company on July 1, 2022, for €625 million, plus an additional €140 million to be paid in 2028, depending on the factory's production capacity.

== Facilities ==
The Kocaeli Plant, located in Gölcük, was opened in 2001, and has been the main global production center for the Transit. It has an annual production capacity of 320,000 vehicles and has its own port. Previously, it also produced the first generation of Transit Custom and first two generations of the Transit Connect.

The Yeniköy plant started production of the Transit/Tourneo Courier in the second quarter of 2014. It is located within the Kocaeli facility, but as a different production plant, with a starting capacity of 110,000 vehicles per year. Ford stopped producing the Courier in Turkey in July 2023 and moved production to Romania in October 2023, launching the new generation. The Yeniköy factory will instead produce the new generation of Transit Custom.

The Craiova plant was founded in 1976 and produced Oltcit until 1994 and Daewoo vehicles until 2008 when it was bought by Ford. Ford Otosan has owned the factory since 2022, and as of 2023, the company produces the Puma crossover and Transit/Tourneo Courier, with electric versions coming in 2024.

The İnönü Plant, located in Eskişehir, began operating in 1982, and has been the production center of the Cargo heavy truck, as well as for engines and powertrains. It has an annual capacity of 10,000 trucks, 66,000 engines and 45,000 gearboxes.

The Sancaktepe Engineering Center, located in the Sancaktepe district of Istanbul, was established in 2014, and is responsible for the development of the newest products and technologies. It employs over 1000 product development engineers.

The Kartal Parts Distribution Center, located in the Sancaktepe district of Istanbul, has been operating since 1998, and it is the marketing centre of the company's marketing, sales, after-sales and spare parts operations.

== Products ==
=== Current ===
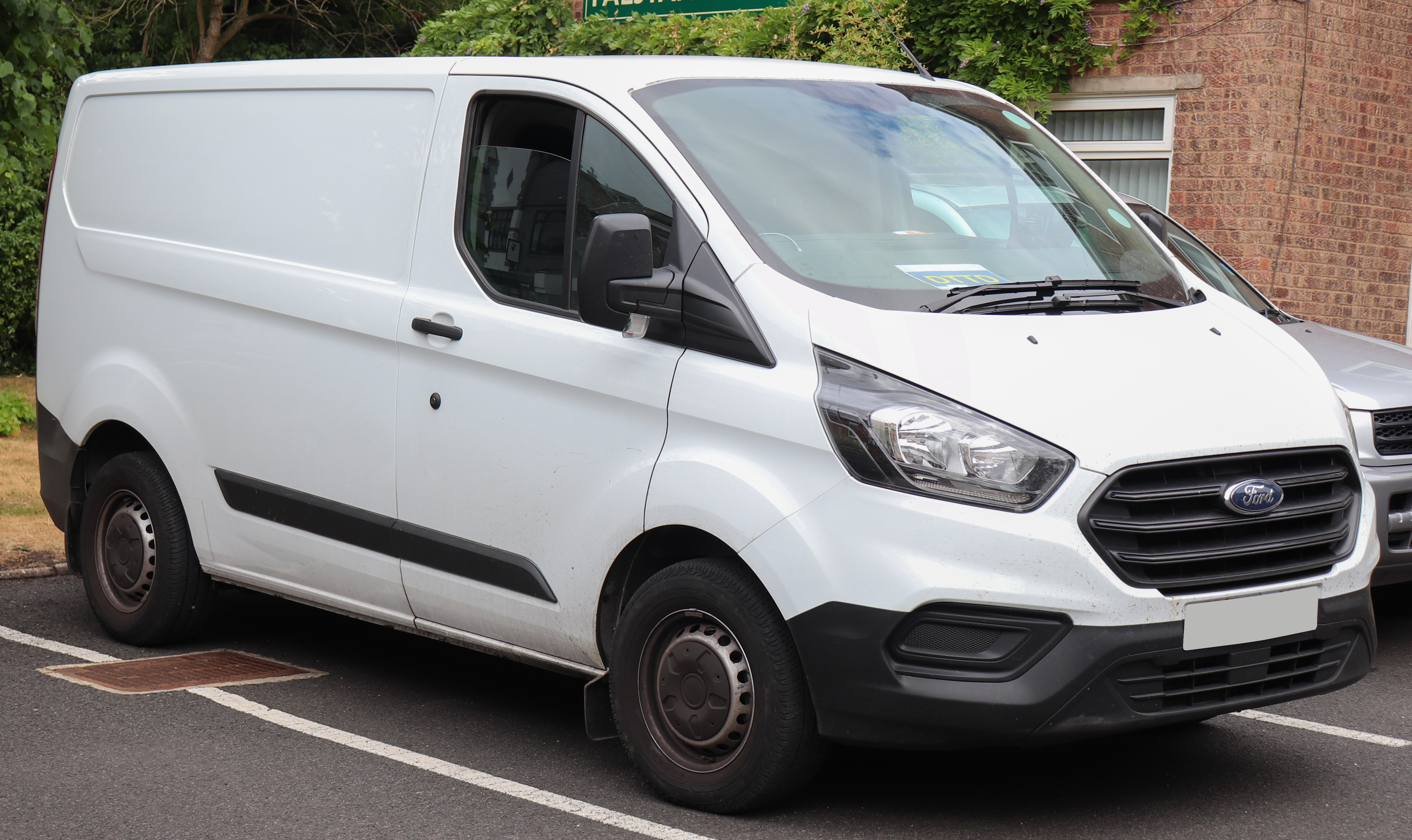
Ford Transit Custom

- Ford Transit (1967–present)
- Ford Transit/Tourneo Custom (2012–present)
- Ford Transit/Tourneo Courier (2014–present)
- Ford F-Max (2018–present)
- Ford Puma (2022–present; original production started in 2019)
- Volkswagen Transporter/Caravelle (2024–present)

=== Historic ===
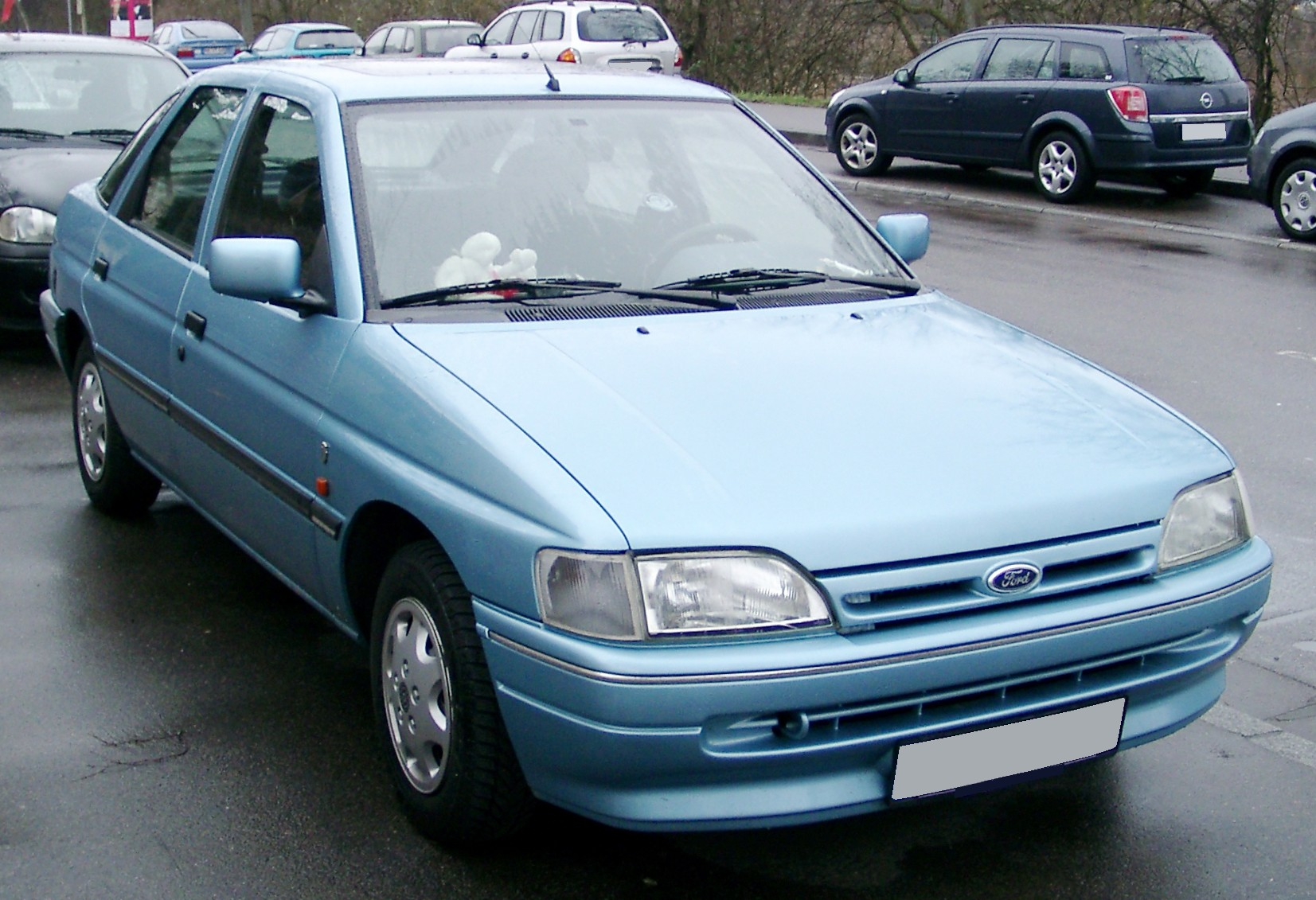
Ford Escort

- Ford Consul (1960–1961)
- Thames Trader (1961–1965)
- Ford D Series (D-750/D-1210) (1965–1983)
- Anadol (1966–1984)
- Anadol STC-16 (1973–1975)
- Ford Cargo/F-Line (1983–1997)
- Ford Taunus (1984–1994)
- Otosan P100 (1991–1996)
- Ford Escort (1993–1999)
- Ford Transit/Tourneo Connect (2002–2013)
- Ford Ecosport (2022; original production started in 2017)

== See also ==
- Ford Ecotorq engine
- List of companies of Turkey
