= Ford Dorset/Dover engine =

Inline Ford diesel engines

The Ford Dorset and Dover engines are a series of inline Ford diesel engines used in vehicles including the Ford Cargo truck between 1981 and 1993. They have continued in production since, for marine and industrial applications. Lehman Brothers of New Jersey are the most famous of the various companies that have marinized the Dorset/Dover engines.

They were available as a 4,146 cubic centimeters (4.146 L; 253.0 cu in) four-cylinder engine, but the engine was also available as a 5,942 cubic centimeters (5.942 L; 362.6 cu in) or 6,218 cubic centimeters (6.218 L; 379.4 cu in) six-cylinder engine. The Dover 5.9 is referred to as a 6.0 sometimes, even by Ford themselves who referred to the turbocharged 5.9 as the 360TC, compared to the naturally aspirated "359"—while they do share dimensions, the Dover 360TC was built to closer clearances, which may have led to minute differences in displacement. As for the four-cylinder engines, the Dover and Dorset variations share a displacement. They can be distinguished by the Dover's higher specifications, with an aluminium rather than a pressed steel manifold, straight-cut gears, and larger ports in the head. The engine code is also different, 2711 for the Dorset and 2722E for the Dover.

The Dorset engine was built in Ford Dagenham in Essex, UK.
