= Ford Cargo =

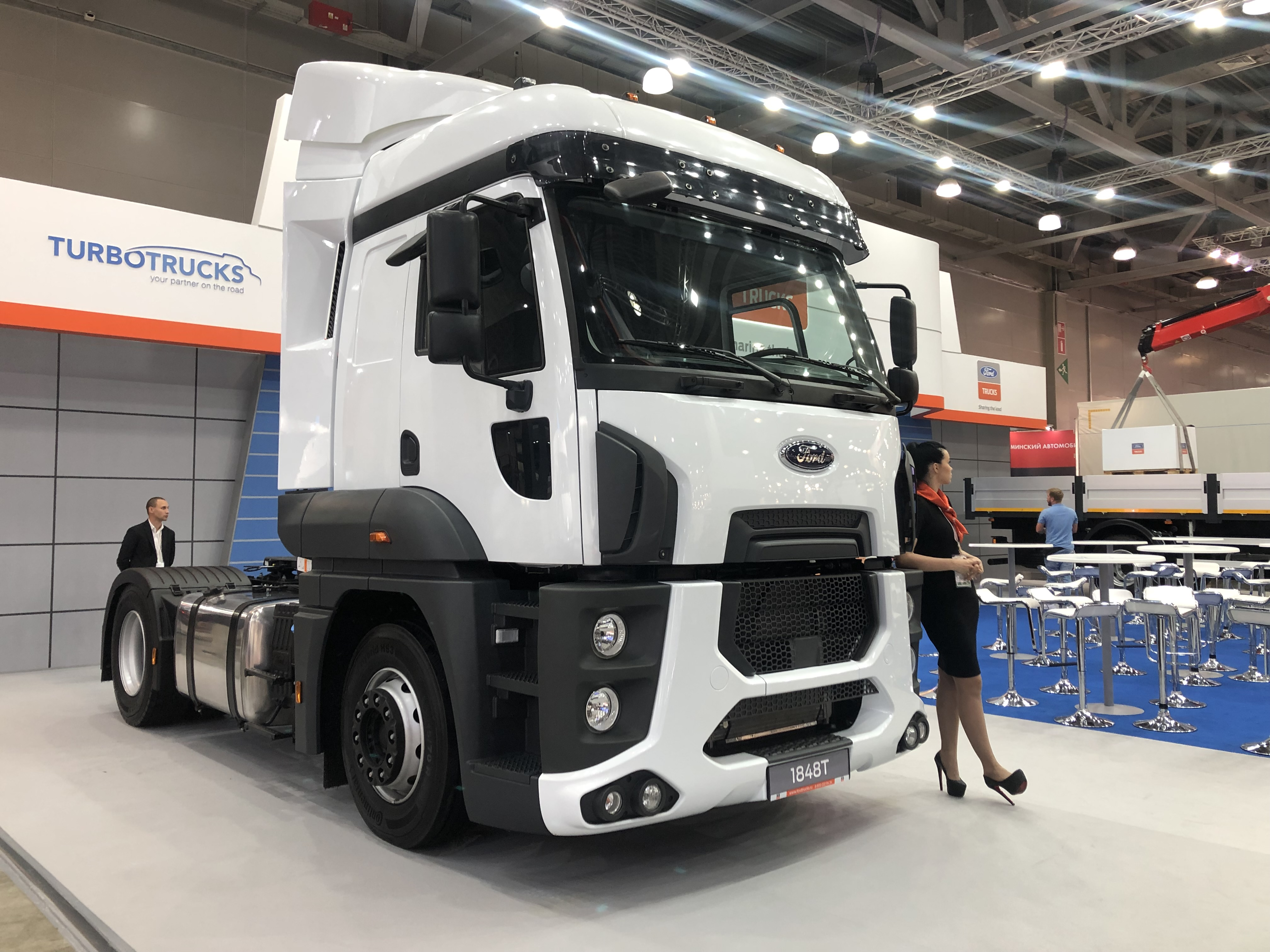

Overview
- Manufacturer: Ford Motor Company
- Also called: Ford F-Line; Freightliner/Sterling Cargo (1999–2007); Ashok Leyland Stallion; Ashok Leyland EComet; JMC Weilong (2018–2022)
- Production: 1981–2019
- Model years: 1981–1997 (Europe); 1986–2007 (North America); 1981–2019 (South America, rest of world)
- Assembly: United Kingdom: Langley, Berkshire (Ford UK); United States: Louisville, Kentucky (Kentucky Truck Assembly); United States: Mount Holly, North Carolina (Freightliner Trucks); Australia: Eagle Farm (Brisbane), Queensland; Turkey: İnönü (Ford Otosan); Russia: Kaliningrad (Avtotor); Argentina: General Pacheco; Brazil: Ipiranga, São Paulo and São Bernardo do Campo, São Paulo (Ford Caminhoes); Venezuela: Valencia, Carabobo; China: Taiyuan (JMC Heavy Duty Vehicle); India: Hosur, Tamil Nadu (Ashok Leyland)
- Designer: Patrick Le Quément (First Generation)

Body and chassis
- Class: Class 7 (USA)
- Body style: Cabover

Powertrain
- Engine: 5.7 Dovertech I6 (1981-2003); 7.3 Ecotorq (2003-2015); 9.0 Ecotorq (2012-2019); 12.7 Ecotorq (2016-2019)

Dimensions
- Wheelbase: variable
- Length: variable

Chronology
- Predecessor: Ford Transcontinental; Ford C-Series (North America); Ford D-series (UK); Ford N-Series (Australasia)
- Successor: Ford LCF (North America); Iveco Eurocargo (Great Britain); Ford F-Max

The Ford Cargo is a forward-control (cab-over-engine) truck model manufactured by Ford since 1981. Designed by Ford of Britain as the successor of the Ford Transcontinental heavy commercial tractor, Ford introduced the Cargo to North America for 1986 as a medium-duty truck, intended to replace the long-running Ford C-Series.

Coinciding with the sale of Ford commercial truck production in Europe and North America, the Cargo design has been sold under multiple brands during its production life. In Europe, it was rebranded as an Iveco Ford, later becoming the Iveco Eurocargo. In North America, the Cargo was included in the 1997 sale of Ford heavy-truck lines to Freightliner, which marketed it as both a Freightliner and a Sterling through 2007.

Originally produced by Ford UK at its Langley facility from 1981 to 1993, the Cargo was also produced by Ford Brasil from 1981 to 2019 (the source of US-market production from 1986 to 1990); from 1991 to 1997, the line was produced by Ford by Kentucky Truck Assembly, in Louisville, Kentucky (for North America, replacing Ford Brasil). Current production of the line is sourced from Ford Otosan in Turkey.

== Model overview ==
The 1981 Ford Cargo was styled by Patrick Le Quément, designer of the Ford Sierra and the later Renault Twingo. The styling of the Cargo intentionally followed the family look of Ford of Europe's car range with the distinctive louvred black "Aeroflow" grille also used on the likes of the Escort III and the Cortina 80, on both of which Le Quement had worked under the leadership of Uwe Bahnsen. Another distinguishing feature of the original design was quarter windows that extend down nearly to floor level (also seen in the Volvo FL) for drivers in urban locations, the design was intended to better show pathways and blind spots while parking.

=== Ford Cargo (Europe) ===
With the demise of the Ford Transcontinental heavy truck range in 1983, British Ford introduced a range of heavyweight Cargo tractor units ranging from 28 to 38 tonnes GCW. The 38-tonners were powered by the Cummins L10, while those at 28- and 32-tonnes had Perkins, Cummins, or air-cooled Deutz diesels. The 7.49-tonne Cargos had Dorset and Dover fours or sixes, starting with a 89 bhp (66 kW) unit in the 0809. The Dover six-cylinder engines were mounted at a slant in the Cargo.

In 1986, Ford sold its European truck operations to the Italian Iveco group, and subsequent vehicles have been badged Iveco Ford. After the recession in the 1990s, Iveco rationalised its production operations, overlooked by Keith Stanley Jones (production engineering manager). Its Langley plant closed in October 1997, bringing British Iveco/Ford truck production to an end.

The original lightweight Cargo was replaced in 1993 by the Iveco Eurocargo range, covering the 7.5-ton to 18-ton GVW range. It was originally only built in Ford's Langley (Slough) plant, from which about a third of the production was exported to continental Europe. Cargos were also exported to Turkey and to Australia, while panels were supplied to Brazil for local assembly (these Brazilian trucks were also exported to the United States).

Production has expanded since; the model is still made in Argentina (only the Cargo 1722 between 1999 and 2000) and Venezuelan (also known as the Ford Trader) Ford subsidiaries, Turkey's Ford Otosan, and India's Ashok Leyland (as the eComet and Stallion, respectively).

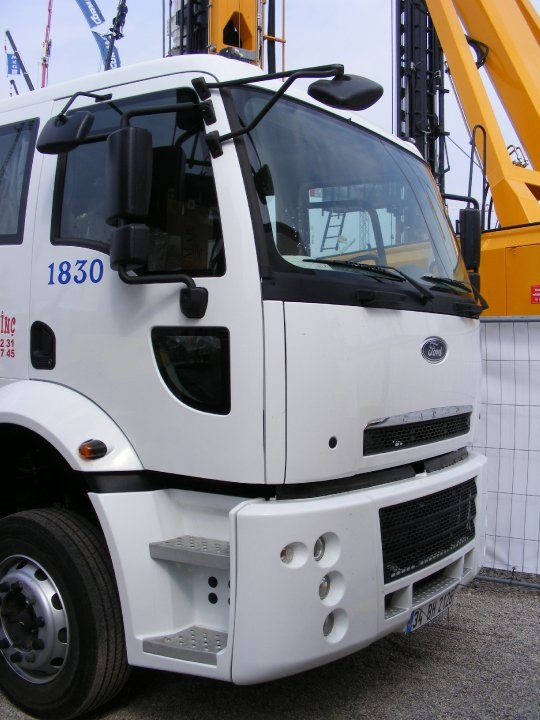
Ford Cargo 1830 (Turkey)

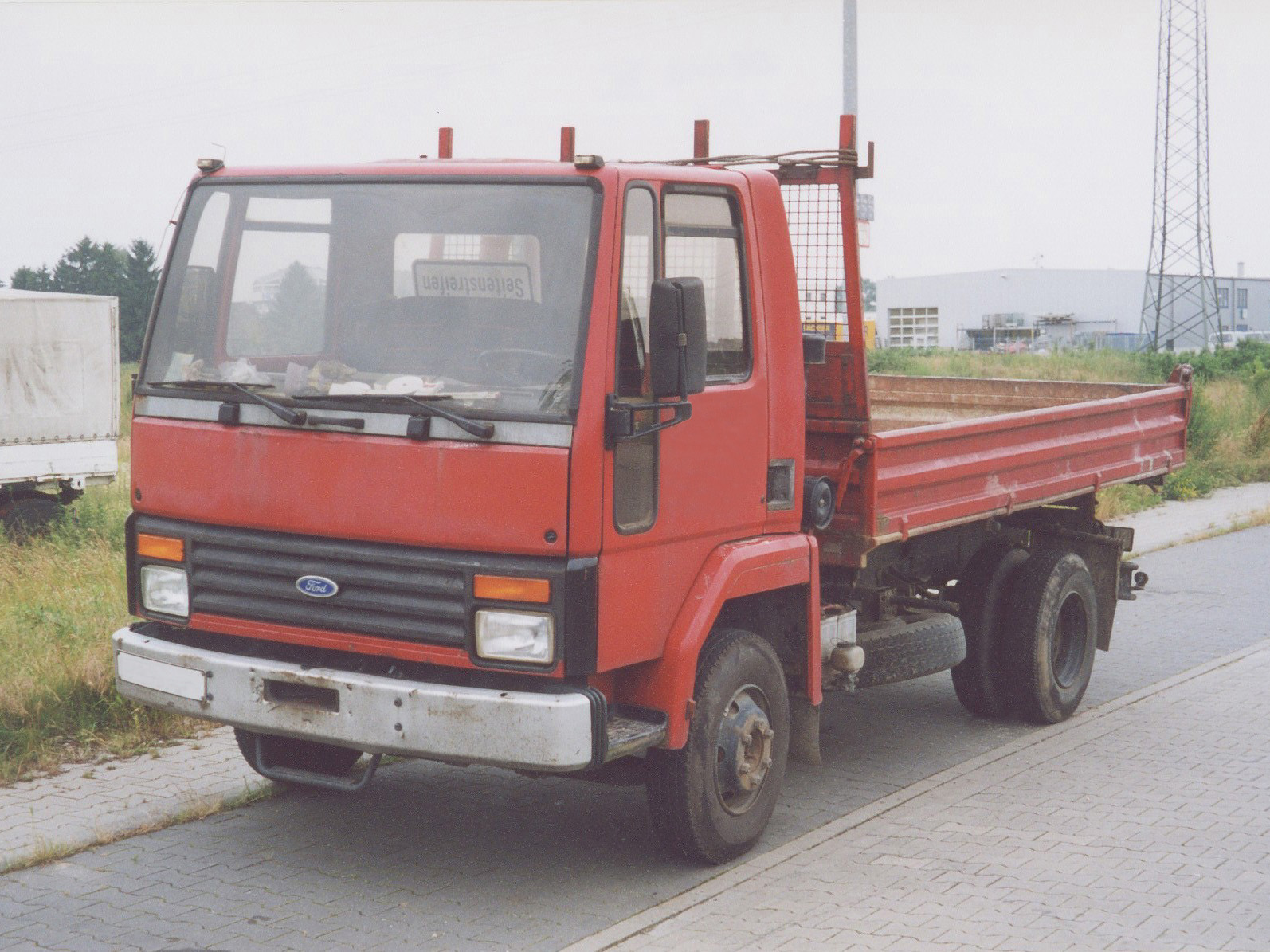
Prefacelift Ford Cargo in Germany

=== Ford Cargo (Americas) ===
In late 1985, for the 1986 model year, Ford introduced the Cargo as part of its United States commercial truck range. Intended to replace the long-running C-Series cabover (largely unchanged since 1957) the Cargo was gradually phased in alongside its predecessor, slotted below the larger CL-9000 semitractor. Production of the model line was sourced from Brazil, making the Cargo the first American-market commercial Ford truck assembled outside of Louisville, Kentucky. Following the retirement of the C-Series, production of the American-market Cargo was relocated to the Kentucky Truck Plant in Louisville, Kentucky for 1991.

Alongside the larger Louisville/Aeromax, the Cargo was included as part of the 1997 sale of the Ford heavy-truck line to Freightliner, which renamed it the Freightliner FC and Sterling SC Cargo. Production of the Freightliner/Sterling Cargo was relocated to a Freightliner facility in Mt. Holly, North Carolina. Nearly unchanged (except for badging), the FC/SC Cargos were produced through the 2007 model year.

In 2006, Ford introduced the Ford LCF as part of its Blue Diamond joint venture with Navistar International. Though not a direct successor to the Cargo (the LCF was a Class 5/6 vehicle, while the Cargo was a Class 6/7 truck), it also shared a low-COE configuration, competing with the Isuzu N-Series, Chevrolet/GMC W-Series, and Mitsubishi Fuso Canter. After a poor market response, the LCF (sold by International as the CF/CityStar) was withdrawn after 2009. As of current production, it remains the last COE truck marketed by Ford in North America.

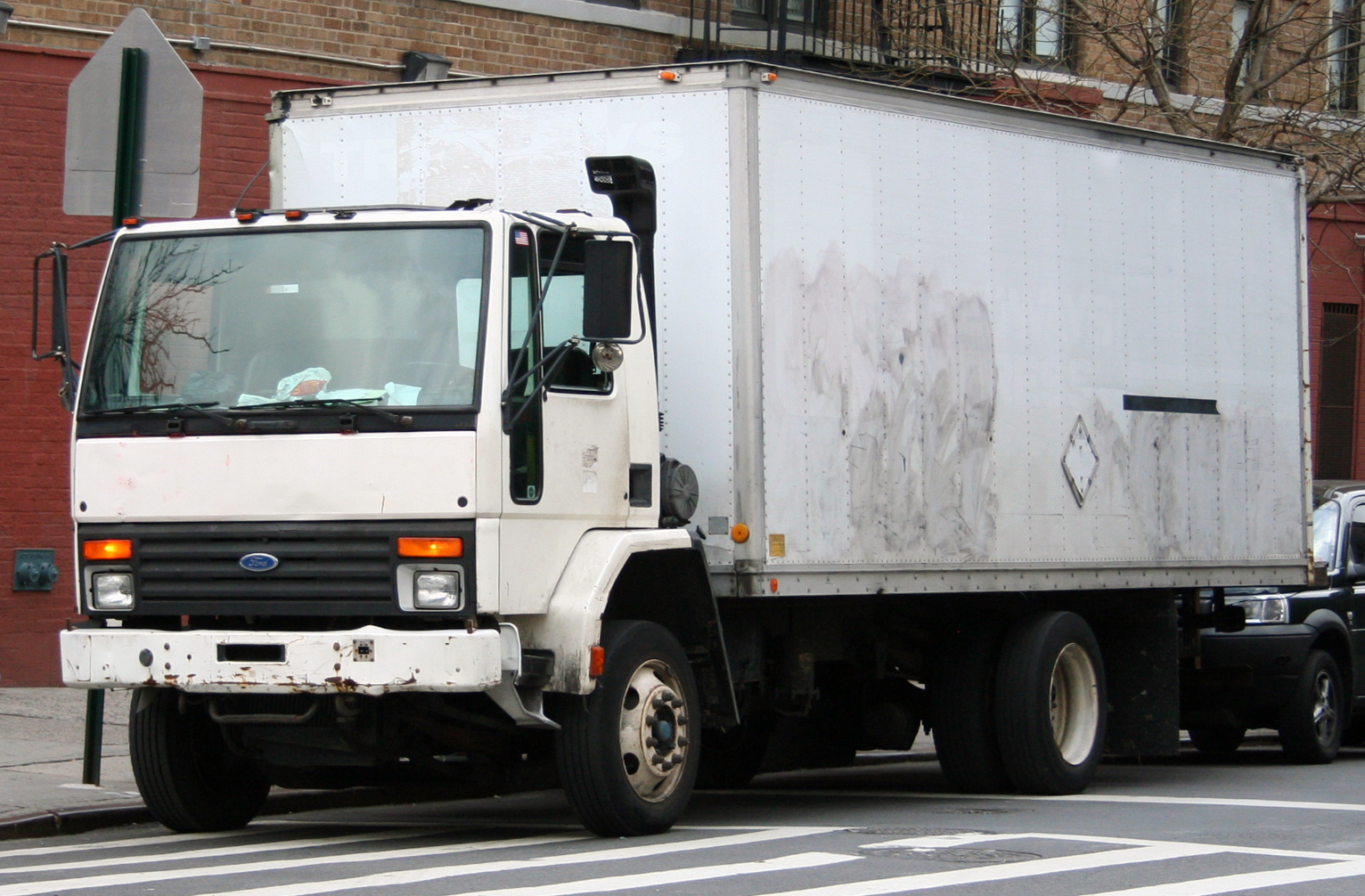
Ford Cargo box truck (United States)

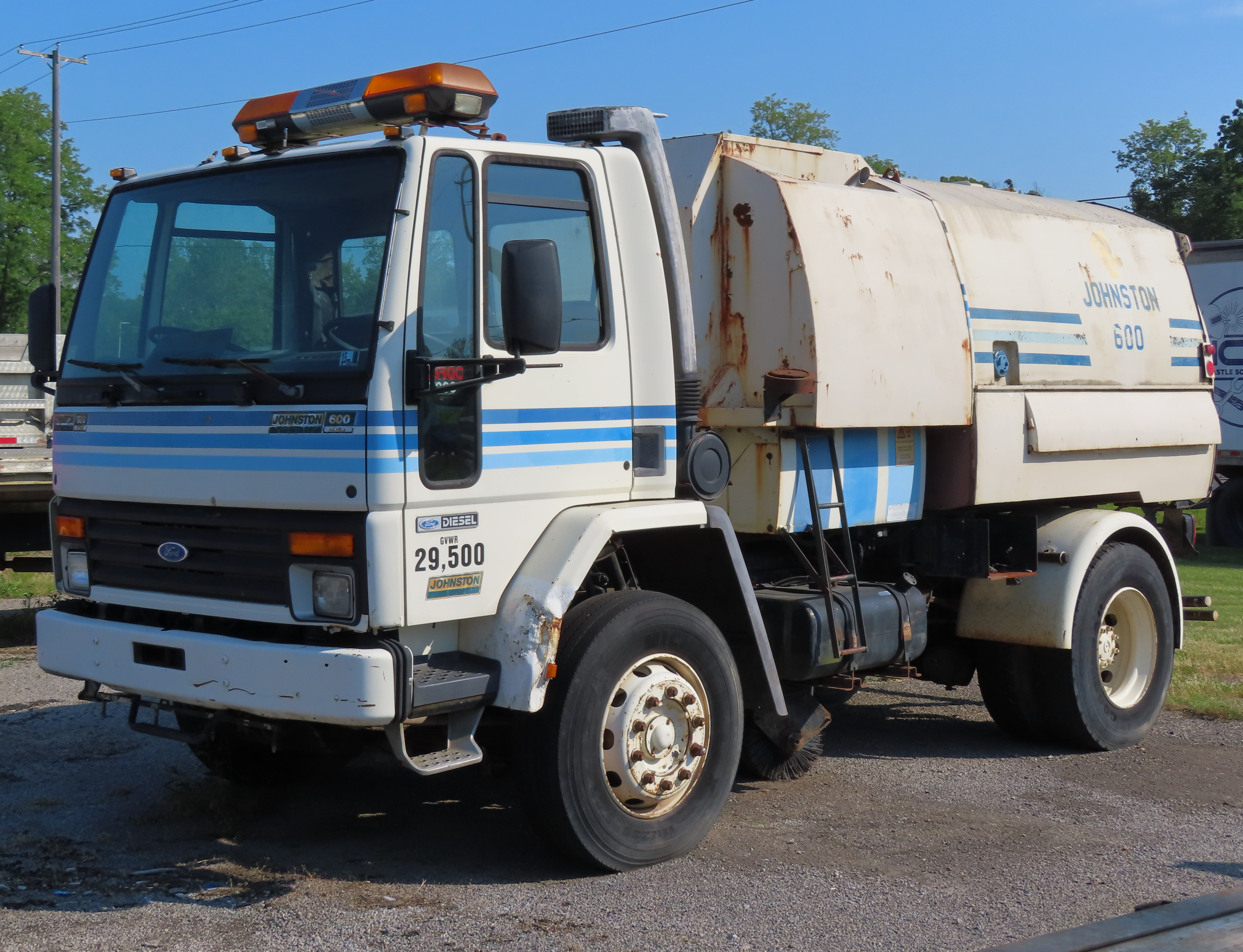
Ford Cargo street sweeper (United States)

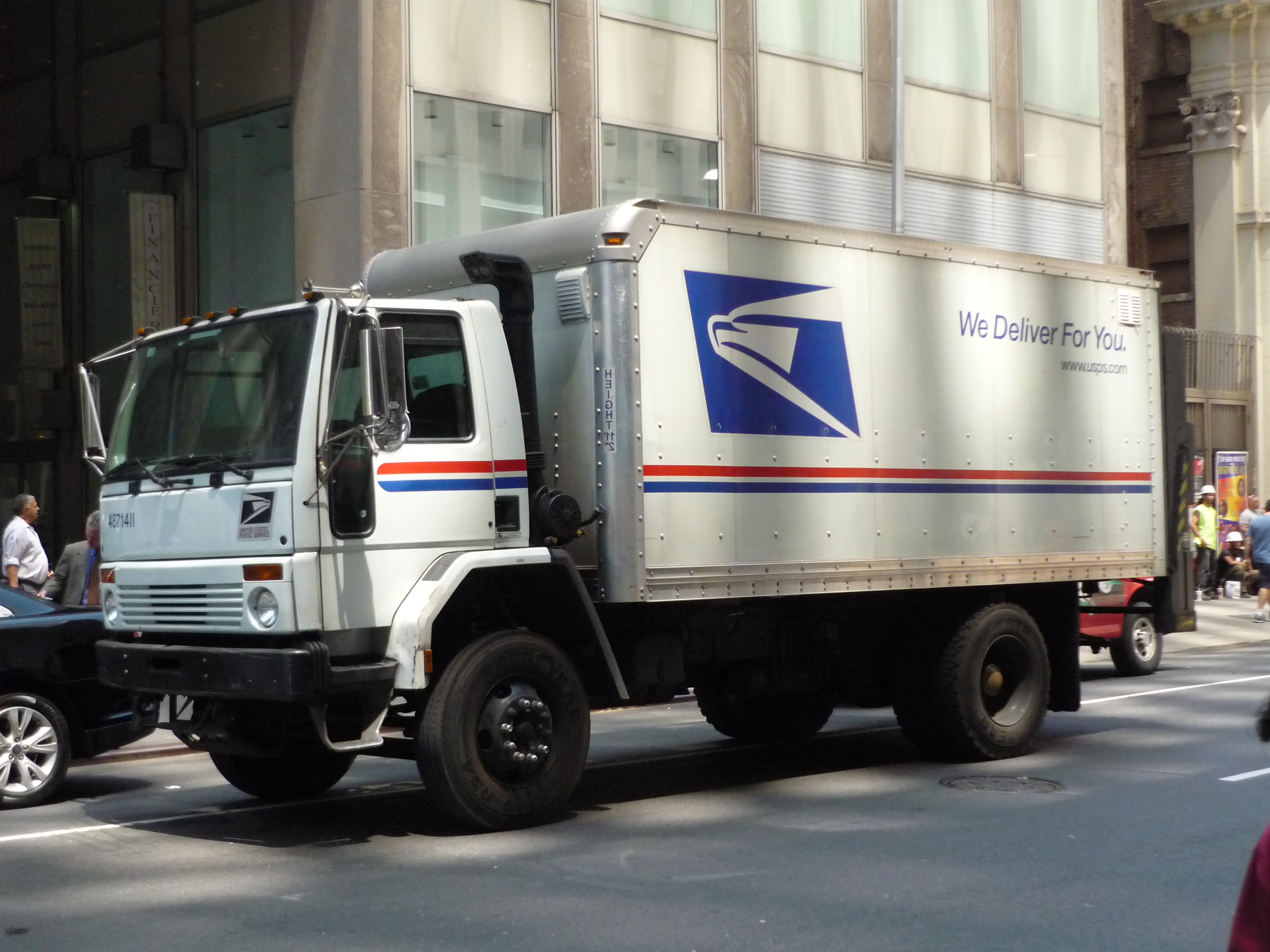
Sterling SC/Freightliner FC in use by the USPS

== Motorsport ==
Rod Chapman won the FIA European Truck Racing Championship in 1985 and 1987 using a modified Cargo, with Gérard Cuynet doing the same in 1988.
