= List of Ford factories =

The following is a list of current, former, and confirmed future facilities of Ford Motor Company for manufacturing automobiles and other components. Per regulations, the factory is encoded into each vehicle's VIN as character 11 for North American models, and character 8 for European models.

The River Rouge Complex manufactured most of the components of Ford vehicles, starting with the Model T. Much of the production was devoted to compiling "knock-down kits" that were then shipped in wooden crates to Branch Assembly locations across the United States by railroad and assembled locally, using local supplies as necessary. A few of the original Branch Assembly locations still remain while most have been repurposed or have been demolished and the land reused. Knock-down kits were also shipped internationally until the River Rouge approach was duplicated in Europe and Asia.

For a listing of Ford's proving grounds and test facilities see Ford Proving Grounds.

== Current production facilities ==
VIN	Name	City/state	Country	Opened	Employees	Products	Comments
	AutoAlliance Thailand	Pluak Daeng district, Rayong	Thailand	1998	6,863	Ford Ranger (T6); Ford Everest; Mazda 2 Mazda 3 Mazda CX-3; Mazda CX-30	Joint venture 50% owned by Ford and 50% owned by Mazda.
	Buffalo Stamping	Hamburg, New York	U.S.	1950	1,100	Body panels	
	Changan Ford Chongqing Assembly	Chongqing	China		5,000+	Ford Escape; Ford Mondeo; Ford Mondeo Sport; Ford Mustang Mach-E; Lincoln Corsair; Lincoln Z	Joint Venture: Chongqing Changan Automobile Co., Ltd. (50%), Ford Motor Company (50%). Complex includes three assembly plants.
	Changan Ford Chongqing Engine	Chongqing	China		1,310	Ford 1.0 L Ecoboost I3 engine Ford 1.5 L Sigma I4 engine Ford 1.5 L EcoBoost I4 engine	Joint Venture: Chongqing Changan Automobile Co., Ltd. (50%), Ford Motor Company (50%).
	Changan Ford Chongqing Transmission	Chongqing	China		1,310	Ford 6F15 transmission Ford 6F35 transmission	
	Changan Ford Hangzhou Assembly	Hangzhou, Zhejiang	China			Ford Edge L Ford Explorer; Lincoln Aviator; Lincoln Nautilus	
	Changan Ford Harbin Assembly	Harbin, Heilongjiang	China			Ford Focus	Plant formerly belonged to Harbin Hafei Automobile Group Co. Bought by Changan Ford in 2015.
CHI/CH/G (NA)	Chicago Assembly	Chicago, Illinois	U.S.	1924	5,810	Ford Explorer (U625); Lincoln Aviator (U611)	Located at 12600 S Torrence Avenue. Replaced the previous location at 3915 Wabash Avenue.
N (NA)	Chicago SHO Center	Chicago, Illinois	U.S.	2021		Ford Explorer; Lincoln Aviator	12429 S Burley Ave in Chicago, about a mile away from the Chicago Assembly Plant.
	Chicago Stamping	Chicago Heights, Illinois	U.S.		1,270		Located at 1000 E Lincoln Hwy, Chicago Heights, IL
	Chihuahua Engine	Chihuahua, Chihuahua	Mexico	1983	690	Ford Duratec 2.0/2.3/2.5 I4; Ford 1.5L Dragon EcoBoost I3; 4.4L Diesel V8; 6.7L Diesel V8	
	Cleveland Engine #1	Brook Park, Ohio	U.S.	1951	1,180	Ford 2.0/2.3 EcoBoost I4; Ford 3.5 L EcoBoost V6; Ford 3.5/3.7 Cyclone V6 (for RWD vehicles)	
A (EU) / E	Cologne Body & Assembly	Cologne, North Rhine-Westphalia	Germany	1931	4,141	Ford Capri EV; Ford Explorer EV	
	Cologne Engine	Cologne, North Rhine-Westphalia	Germany		1,008	1.0 litre EcoBoost I3; Aston Martin V12 engine	Previously: Ford Taunus V4 engine Ford Cologne V6 engine Aston Martin 4.3/4.7 V8
	Cologne Tool & Die	Cologne, North Rhine-Westphalia	Germany		1,144	Tooling, dies, fixtures, jigs, die repair	
	Cologne Transmission	Cologne, North Rhine-Westphalia	Germany		1,590	Ford MTX-75 transmission Ford VXT-75 transmission Ford VMT6 transmission Volvo M56/M58/M66 transmission Ford MMT6 transmission	Formerly part of the Getrag Ford Transmission joint venture. Returned to 100% Ford ownership in 2021.
	Cortako Cologne GmbH	Cologne, North Rhine-Westphalia	Germany	1961	410	Forging of steel parts for engines, transmissions, and chassis	Originally known as Cologne Forge & Die Cast Plant. Previously known as Tekfor Cologne GmbH from 2003 to 2011, a 50/50 joint venture between Ford and Neumayer Tekfor GmbH. Bought back by Ford in 2011 and now 100% owned by Ford.
	Coscharis Motors Assembly Ltd.	Lagos	Nigeria			Ford Ranger	Plant owned by Coscharis Motors Assembly Ltd. Built under contract for Ford.
M (NA)	Cuautitlán Assembly	Cuautitlán Izcalli, Mexico State	Mexico	1964		Ford Mustang Mach-E	Truck assembly began in 1970 while car production began in 1980.
	Dagenham Engine	Dagenham	England, UK	1931	2,047	Ford DLD engine (Tiger); Ford EcoBlue engine (Panther); Ford 2.7/3.0 Lion Diesel V6	
W (NA)	Ford Rouge Electric Vehicle Center	Dearborn, Michigan	U.S.	2021		Ford F-150 Lightning EV	Part of the River Rouge Complex.
	Dearborn Diversified Manufacturing Plant	Dearborn, Michigan	U.S.			Axles, suspension parts. Frames for F-Series trucks.	Part of the River Rouge Complex.
	Dearborn Engine	Dearborn, Michigan	U.S.		911	Ford Duratec 20; Ford Duratec 23; Ford Duratec 25	Part of the River Rouge Complex. Previously: Ford FE engine Ford CVH engine
	Dearborn Stamping	Dearborn, Michigan	U.S.		1,780	Body stampings	Part of the River Rouge Complex.
	Dearborn Tool & Die	Dearborn, Michigan	U.S.			Tooling	Part of the River Rouge Complex.
F (NA)	Dearborn Truck Plant	Dearborn, Michigan	U.S.	2004		Ford F-150	Part of the River Rouge Complex. Replaced the nearby Dearborn Assembly Plant.
0 (NA)	Detroit Chassis LLC	Detroit, Michigan	U.S.			F-53 motorhome chassis F-59 commercial chassis	Replaced production at IMMSA in Mexico. Plant owned by Detroit Chassis LLC.
	Essex Engine	Windsor, Ontario	Canada	1981	820	Ford Coyote V8; Engine components	Idled in November 2007, reopened February 2010. Previously: Ford Essex V6 engine (Canadian); Ford 5.4L 3-valve Modular V8
5 (NA)	Flat Rock Assembly Plant	Flat Rock, Michigan	U.S.	1987	1,800	Ford Mustang	Built at site of closed Ford Michigan Casting Center (1972–1981). Opened as a Mazda plant; known as AutoAlliance International from 1992 to 2012.
	Ford Lio Ho Assembly	Zhongli District, Taoyuan	Taiwan	1973	2,332	Ford Focus; Ford Kuga; Ford Territory; Ford Focus Active	Joint venture 70% owned by Ford and 30% owned by Lio Ho Group.
	Ford Lio Ho Engine	Zhongli District, Taoyuan	Taiwan		2,332	Ford Zeta engine Mazda 1.6 ZM-DE I4; Mazda F engine (1.8, 2.0); Mazda L engine (1.8, 2.0, 2.3); Suzuki 1.0 I4 (for Ford Pronto)	
	Ford Motor Company of Southern Africa Silverton Assembly Plant	Silverton	South Africa	1967	4,310	Ford Ranger; Ford Everest; VW Amarok	
	Ford Motor Company of Southern Africa Struandale Engine Plant	Struandale, Port Elizabeth	South Africa		590	Ford EcoBlue engine Ford 3.0 Lion turbodiesel V6; Ford 2.2/3.2 Puma diesel engine Machining of engine components	Previously: Ford Kent Crossflow I4 engine Ford 1.4L CVH-PTE engine Ford 1.6L EFI Zetec I4; Ford Zetec RoCam engine Ford Essex V6 engine (UK)
T	Ford Otosan Assembly - Gölcük	Gölcük, Kocaeli	Turkey	2001	7,534	Ford Transit; Ford Transit Custom; Ford Tourneo Custom	Transit Connect started shipping to the US in fall of 2009.
T	Ford Otosan Assembly - Yeniköy	Gölcük, Kocaeli	Turkey	2014		Ford Transit Courier	Opened 2014. Previously: Ford Tourneo Courier
	Ford Otosan Engine	Inonu, Eskisehir	Turkey	1982	1,608	Ford Puma I4/I5 diesel engine Ford EcoBlue engine Ford Cargo truck Ford F-MAX; Ford Ecotorq engine Ford EcoTorq transmission Rear axles	Opened 1982. Previously: Ford D series Ford 1.6 Zetec I4; Ford 2.5 DI diesel I4; Ford 6.0/6.2 diesel inline-6 7.3L Ecotorq diesel I6; Ford MT75 transmission for Transit
R (EU)	Ford Romania	Craiova	Romania	2009	5,581	Ford Transit Connect (2009); Ford B-Max (2012); Ford EcoSport (2017); Ford Puma (2019); Ford Transit Courier (2023); Ford 1.0 Fox EcoBoost I3; Ford 1.5 Sigma EcoBoost I4	Former Oltcit car factory acquired from Daewoo Motors in 2008. Operated by Ford Otosan since 2022.
	Ford Thailand Manufacturing	Pluak Daeng district, Rayong	Thailand	2012	2,020	Ford Ranger (T6)	
	Hai Duong Assembly, Ford Vietnam, Ltd.	Hai Duong	Vietnam	1995	670	Ford Transit; Ford Ranger (T6)	Joint venture 75% owned by Ford and 25% owned by Song Cong Diesel Company.
	Halewood Transmission	Halewood, Merseyside	England, UK		710	Ford MT75 transmission Ford MT82 transmission Ford IB5 transmission Ford iB6 transmission PTO Transmissions	Formerly part of the Getrag Ford Transmission joint venture. Returned to 100% Ford ownership in 2021.
R (NA)	Hermosillo Stamping and Assembly	Hermosillo, Sonora	Mexico	1986		Ford Bronco Sport; Ford Maverick pickup	
	Irapuato Transmission Plant	Irapuato, Guanajuato	Mexico		900	Ford 6F15 transmission Ford 8F24 transmission	Formerly Getrag Americas, a joint venture between Getrag and the Getrag Ford Transmission joint venture. Became 100% owned by Ford in 2016.
	Jiangling Motors Corp., Ltd. (JMC Xiaolan Assembly Plant)	Xiaolan Economic Development Zone, Nanchang, Jiangxi	China	1997	7,258	Ford Transit Pro; Ford Transit; Ford Tourneo; Ford Equator; Ford Equator Sport; Ford Territory; Ford Bronco New Energy; Ford Transit City	Partnership with Jiangling Investment Co., Ltd. Jiangling Motors is 32% owned by Ford.
	Jiangling Motors Corp., Ltd. (JMC Xiaolan Engine Plant)	Xiaolan Economic Development Zone, Nanchang, Jiangxi	China			Ford 2.0 L EcoBoost I4; JMC 1.5/1.8 GTDi engines	
K (NA)	Kansas City Assembly	Claycomo, Missouri	U.S.	1951	7,250	Ford F-150; Ford Transit	Replaced the original location at 1025 Winchester Ave. Military production (including wings for B-46 bombers) only from 1951 to 1956, when it converted to civilian production.
E (NA) or V (NA) for med. & heavy trucks & bus chassis	Kentucky Truck Assembly	Louisville, Kentucky	U.S.	1969	8,920	Ford Super Duty; Ford Expedition; Lincoln Navigator	Located at 3001 Chamberlain Lane.
	Lima Engine	Lima, Ohio	U.S.	1957	730	Ford 2.7/3.0 Nano EcoBoost V6; Ford 3.3 Cyclone V6; Ford 3.5/3.7 Cyclone V6 (for FWD vehicles)	
	Livonia Transmission	Livonia, Michigan	U.S.		1,849	Ford 6R transmission Ford 10R60/10R80 transmission Ford 8F35/8F40 transmission	
U (NA)	Louisville Assembly Plant	Louisville, Kentucky	U.S.	1955	4,100	Ford Escape; Lincoln Corsair	
L (NA)	Michigan Assembly Plant	Wayne, Michigan	U.S.	1957		Ford Ranger (T6); Ford Bronco (U725)	Located at 38303 Michigan Ave. Formerly called Michigan Truck Plant.
S (NA)	New Model Programs Development Center	Allen Park, Michigan	U.S.	1956		Continental Mark II	Commonly known as "Pilot Plant"
	Nordex S.A.	Montevideo	Uruguay			Ford Transit	Plant owned by Nordex S.A. Built under contract for Ford for South American markets.
B (NA)	Oakville Assembly	Oakville, Ontario	Canada	1953	4,500	None	
D (NA)	Ohio Assembly	Avon Lake, Ohio	U.S.	1974	1,821	Ford Econoline; Ford F-650/750; Ford; F-350/450/550/600 Chassis Cab	
B (SA)	Pacheco Stamping and Assembly	General Pacheco, Buenos Aires Province	Argentina	1961	2,123	Ford Ranger (T6)	Part of Autolatina venture with VW from 1987 to 1996. Ford kept this side of the Pacheco plant when Autolatina dissolved.
	Rawsonville Components	Ypsilanti, Michigan	U.S.	1956		Integrated Air/Fuel Modules; Air Induction Systems; Transmission Oil Pumps; HEV and PHEV Batteries; Fuel Pumps; Carbon Canisters; Ignition Coils; Transmission components for Van Dyke Transmission Plant	Located at 10300 Textile Road. Spun off as part of Visteon in 2000. Taken back by Ford in 2005 as part of Automotive Components Holdings LLC. Sold to parent Ford in 2009.
	RMA Automotive Cambodia	Krakor district, Pursat province	Cambodia			Ford Ranger (T6); Ford Everest	Plant belongs to RMA Group, Ford's distributor in Cambodia. Builds vehicles under license from Ford.
	Sanand Engine Plant	Sanand, Gujarat	India	2015		Ford EcoBlue/Panther Diesel I4 engine 1.2/1.5 Ti-VCT Dragon I3	
	Sharonville Transmission	Sharonville, Ohio	U.S.		1,790	Ford 6R140 transmission Ford 10R80/10R140 transmission Gears for 6R80/140, 6F35/50/55, & 8F57 transmissions	
	Sterling Axle	Sterling Heights, Michigan	U.S.	1956		Front axles Rear axles Rear drive units	Located at 39000 Mound Rd. Spun off as part of Visteon in 2000; taken back by Ford in 2005 as part of Automotive Components Holdings LLC.
J (SA)	Valencia Assembly	Valencia, Carabobo	Venezuela	1962	1,797	Ford Explorer	Serves Ford markets in Colombia, Ecuador and Venezuela.
P (EU) / 1	Ford Valencia Body and Assembly	Almussafes, Valencia	Spain	1976	6,180	Ford Kuga	
	Valencia Engine	Almussafes, Valencia	Spain		1,000	Ford Duratec HE 1.8/2.0; Ford Ecoboost 2.0L; Ford Ecoboost 2.3L	
	Van Dyke Electric Powertrain Center	Sterling Heights, Michigan	U.S.		1,260	Ford 6F35/6F55; Ford HF35/HF45 transmission for hybrids & PHEVs; Ford 8F57 transmission electric motors (eMotor) for hybrids & EVs electric vehicle transmissions	Located at 41111 Van Dyke Ave. Formerly known as Van Dyke Transmission Plant. Originally made suspension parts. Previously: Ford AX4N transmission Ford FN transmission
X	Volkswagen Poznań	Poznań	Poland			Ford Tourneo Connect; VW Caddy; VW Transporter (T6)	Plant owned by Volkswagen. Production for Ford began in 2022.
WA/W (NA)	Wayne Stamping & Assembly	Wayne, Michigan	U.S.	1952			Located at 37500 Van Born Rd. Integrated into the Michigan Assembly Plant.
	Windsor Engine Plant	Windsor, Ontario	Canada	1923	1,850	Ford Godzilla engine	
	Woodhaven Forging	Woodhaven, Michigan	U.S.			Crankshaft forgings for V6 engines	
	Woodhaven Stamping	Woodhaven, Michigan	U.S.	1964	1,359	Body panels	

== Future production facilities ==
VIN	Name	City/state	Country	Status	Employees	Products	Comments
	BlueOval City Tennessee Truck Plant	Stanton, Tennessee	U.S.	Under Construction	~6,000	Ford Tough trucks	Scheduled to start production in 2025. Battery manufacturing would be part of BlueOval SK, formerly a joint venture with SK Innovation. Truck production planned for 2029.
	BlueOval SK Battery Park	Glendale, Kentucky	U.S.	Under Construction	~5,000	Batteries	Scheduled to start production in 2025. Also formerly part of BlueOval SK.

== Former production facilities ==
VIN	Name	City/State	Country	Years	Products	Comments
	Alexandria Assembly	Alexandria	Egypt	1950–1966	Ford trucks including Thames Trader trucks	Opened in 1950.
	Ali Automobiles	Karachi	Pakistan	1953–1970s	Ford Anglia, Ford Cortina, Ford Kombi, Ford F-Series pickups	Ali Automobiles was nationalized in 1972, becoming Awami Autos
N (EU)	Amsterdam Assembly	Amsterdam	Netherlands	1932–1981	Ford Transit, Ford Transcontinental, Ford D-Series, Ford N-Series (EU)	Assembled a wide range of Ford products primarily for the local market.
	Antwerp Assembly	Antwerp	Belgium	1922–1964	Ford Model T Ford Model A Ford Model Y 1932 Ford; 1949 Ford; Ford Taunus P3; Ford Taunus P4; Ford Falcon; Ford Fairlane; Edsel (CKD); Ford F-Series	Original plant was on Rue Dubois from 1922 to 1926. Ford then moved to the Hoboken District of Antwerp in 1926 until they moved to a plant near the Bassin Canal in 1931. Replaced by the Genk plant that opened in 1964 however tractors were then made at Antwerp for some time after car & truck production ended.
	Asnières-sur-Seine Assembly	Asnières-sur-Seine	France	1916–1927	Ford Model T Ford Model A Ford Model Y (Ford 6CV)	Ford sold the plant to Société Immobilière Industrielle d'Asnières or SIIDA on April 30, 1941.
G	Aston Martin Gaydon Assembly	Gaydon, Warwickshire	England, UK	2003–2007	Aston Martin DB9; Aston Martin V8 Vantage/V12 Vantage; Aston Martin DBS V12	Sold along with Aston Martin.
T (DBS-based V8 & Lagonda sedan); B (Virage & Vanquish)	Aston Martin Newport Pagnell Assembly	Newport Pagnell, Buckinghamshire	England, UK	1993–2007	Aston Martin V12 Vanquish; Aston Martin Virage 1st generation Aston Martin V8; Aston Martin Lagonda sedan Aston Martin V8 engine	Sold along with Aston Martin.
AT/A	Atlanta Assembly	Hapeville, Georgia	U.S.	1947–2006	Ford Taurus, Mercury Sable	Site now occupied by the headquarters of Porsche North America.
	Auckland Operations	Wiri	New Zealand	1973–1997	Ford Laser; Ford Telstar; Ford Falcon; Mazda 323; Mazda 626	Opened in 1973 as Wiri Assembly (also included transmission & chassis component plants), name changed in 1983 to Auckland Operations, became a joint venture with Mazda called Vehicles Assemblers of New Zealand (VANZ) in 1987, closed in 1997.
	Automotive Industries, Ltd. (AIL)	Nazareth Illit	Israel	1968–1985?	Ford Escort; Ford Transit; Ford D Series; Ford L-9000	Car production began in 1968 in conjunction with Ford's local distributor, Israeli Automobile Corp. Truck production began in 1973.
	Avtotor	Kaliningrad	Russia	2014–2022	Ford Cargo truck Ford F-MAX	Produced trucks under contract for Ford Otosan. Production began with the Cargo in 2015; the F-Max was added in 2019.
P (EU)	Azambuja Assembly	Azambuja	Portugal	1963–2000	Ford Anglia; Ford Cortina; Ford Escort; Ford Granada; Ford P100; Ford Taunus P4 (12M); Ford Taunus Transit; Ford Thames 400E; Ford Transit; Thames Trader	
G (EU)	Barcelona Assembly	Barcelona	Spain	1923–1954	Ford Model T Ford Model A 1932 Ford; Ford Model Y Ford Model C Ten	Became Motor Iberica SA after nationalization in 1954. Built Ford's Thames Trader trucks under license which were sold under the Ebro name. Later taken over in stages by Nissan from 1979 to 1987 when it became Nissan Motor Ibérica SA. Under Nissan, the Ford Maverick SUV was built in the Barcelona plant under an OEM agreement.
	Barracas Assembly	Barracas, Buenos Aires	Argentina	1916–1922	Ford Model T	First Ford assembly plant in Latin America and the second outside North America after Britain. Replaced by the La Boca plant in 1922.
	Basildon	Basildon, Essex	England, U.K.	1964–1991	Ford tractor range	Sold with New Holland tractor business
	Batavia Transmission	Batavia, Ohio	U.S.	1980–2008	Ford CD4E transmission Ford ATX transmission CFT23 & CFT30 CVT transmissions produced as part of ZF Batavia joint venture with ZF Friedrichshafen	ZF Batavia joint venture was created in 1999 and was 49% owned by Ford and 51% owned by ZF Friedrichshafen. Jointly developed CVT production began in late 2003. Ford bought out ZF in 2005 and the plant became Batavia Transmissions LLC, owned 100% by Ford.
	Berlin Assembly	Berlin	Germany	1925?–1931	Ford Model T Ford Model TT; Ford Model A	Replaced by Cologne plant.
	Ford Aquitaine Industries Bordeaux Automatic Transmission Plant	Blanquefort	France	1973–2019	Ford C3/A4LD/A4LDE/4R44E/4R55E/5R44E/5R55E/5R55S/5R55W 3-, 4-, & 5-speed automatic transmissions Ford 6F35 6-speed automatic transmission Components	Sold to HZ Holding in 2009 but the deal collapsed and Ford bought the plant back in 2011.
K (DB7)	Bloxham Assembly	Bloxham, Oxfordshire	England, U.K.	1993–2003	Aston Martin DB7; Jaguar XJ220	Originally a JaguarSport plant. After XJ220 production ended, plant was transferred to Aston Martin to build the DB7. Closed with the end of DB7 production.
V (NA)	Blue Diamond Truck	General Escobedo, Nuevo León	Mexico	2001–2015	Ford F-650; Ford F-750; Ford LCF	Commercial truck joint venture with Navistar until 2015 when Ford production moved back to USA and plant was returned to Navistar.
	Bombay Assembly	Bombay	India	1926–1954		Ford's original Indian plant.
	Bordeaux Assembly	Bordeaux	France	1913?–1925	Ford Model T	Replaced by Asnières-sur-Seine plant.
	Bridgend Engine	Bridgend	Wales, U.K.	1980–2020	Ford CVH engine Ford Sigma engine Ford 1.5/1.6 Sigma EcoBoost I4; Ford Zeta engine Ford 1.5L Dragon EcoBoost I3; Jaguar AJ-V8 engine 4.0/4.2/4.4L; Jaguar AJ126 3.0L V6; Jaguar AJ133 5.0L V8; Volvo SI6 engine	
JG (AU) / G / 8	Broadmeadows Assembly Plant (Broadmeadows Car Assembly) (Plant 1)	Campbellfield, Victoria	Australia	1959–2016	Ford Falcon; Ford Fairlane; Ford LTD; Ford Territory	
JL (AU) / L	Broadmeadows Commercial Vehicle Plant (Assembly Plant 2)	Campbellfield, Victoria	Australia	1971–1992	Ford F-Series; Ford F-Series medium duty Ford L-Series/Louisville/Aeromax; Ford Transit; Ford Bronco	
	Cádiz Assembly	Cádiz	Spain	1920–1923	Ford Model T	Replaced by Barcelona plant.
8	Camaçari Plant	Camaçari, Bahia	Brazil	2001–2021	Ford Ka; Ford Ka+ Ford EcoSport; Fox 1.0L I3 Engine	
	Canton Forge Plant	Canton, Ohio	U.S.	1947?–1988		Located on Georgetown Road NE.
	Casablanca Automotive Plant	Casablanca, Chile	Chile	1969–1971	Ford Falcon Ford F-series, Ford F-600	Nationalized by the Chilean government.
	Changan Ford Mazda Automobile Co.	Nanjing, Jiangsu	China	2001–2012	Ford Fiesta; Mazda 2 Mazda 3	Joint venture: Chongqing Changan Automobile Co., Ltd. (50%). Ford Motor Company (35%), Mazda Motor Company (15%). Was divided in 2012 into Changan Ford and Changan Mazda. Changan Mazda took the Nanjing plant while Changan Ford kept the other plants.
	Changan Ford Mazda Engine Co.	Nanjing, Jiangsu	China	2007–2019	Ford Sigma engine Mazda L engine Mazda BZ series 1.3/1.6 engine Mazda Skyactiv-G 1.5/2.0/2.5	Joint venture: Chongqing Changan Automobile Co., Ltd. (50%), Ford Motor Company (25%), Mazda Motor Company (25%). Ford sold its stake to Mazda in 2019. Now known as Changan Mazda Engine Co., Ltd. owned 50% by Mazda & 50% by Changan.
	Charles McEnearney & Co. Ltd.	Tumpuna Road, Arima	Trinidad and Tobago		Ford Cortina, Ford Laser	Closed in the 1990s.
	Chennai Engine Plant	Maraimalai Nagar, Tamil Nadu	India	2010–2022	Ford DLD engine Ford Sigma engine	
	Chennai Vehicle Assembly Plant	Maraimalai Nagar, Tamil Nadu	India	1999–2022	Ford Endeavour; Ford Fiesta 5th & 6th generations Ford Figo; Ford EcoSport; Ford Ikon; Ford Fusion	
	Cleveland Aluminum Casting Plant	Brook Park, Ohio	U.S.	2000?–2003	Aluminum engine blocks	
	Cleveland Casting	Brook Park, Ohio	U.S.	1953?–2010	Iron engine blocks, heads, crankshafts, and bearing caps	Construction 1950, operational 1952 to 2010. Demolished 2011
	Cleveland Engine #2	Brook Park, Ohio	U.S.	1955–2012	Ford 2.5L Duratec V6; Ford 3.0L Duratec V6; Jaguar AJ-V6 engine	Source of the Ford 351 Cleveland V8 & the Cleveland-based 400 V8. Also, Ford Y-block engine & Ford Super Duty engine.
	Compañía Colombiana Automotriz (Mazda)	Bogotá	Colombia	1983–2014	Ford Laser; Mazda 323; Ford Ranger; Mazda B series Mazda BT-50	Plant owned by Mazda.
E (EU)	Henry Ford & Sons Ltd	Marina, Cork	Munster, Ireland	1919–1984	Fordson tractor (from 1919) and car assembly, including Ford Escort and Ford Cortina in the 1970s finally ending with the Ford Sierra in 1980s. Also Ford Transit, Ford A series, and Ford D Series. Also Ford Model T, Ford Model A, Ford Model Y, Ford Corsair, Ford Consul, Ford Prefect, and Ford Zephyr.	Founded in 1917 with production from 1919 to 1984
	Croydon Stamping	Croydon	England, UK	1957–2003	Parts - Small metal stampings and assemblies	Opened in 1949 as Briggs Motor Bodies & purchased by Ford in 1957. Expanded in 1989. Site completely vacated in 2005.
	Cuautitlán Engine	Cuautitln Izcalli, Mexico State	Mexico	1964–present	Opened in 1964. Included a foundry and machining plant. Ford 289 V8; Ford 302 V8; Ford 351 Windsor V8	
A (EU)	Dagenham Assembly	Dagenham	England, UK	1931–2002	Ford Model A, 1932 Ford, Ford Model Y, Ford Model C Ten, Ford CX, Ford 7W, Ford 7Y, Ford Model 91, Ford Pilot, Ford Anglia, Ford Prefect, Ford Popular, Ford Squire, Ford Consul, Ford Zephyr, Ford Zodiac, Ford Consul Classic, Ford Corsair, Ford Cortina, Ford Granada, Ford Fiesta, Ford Sierra, Ford Courier, Mazda 121, Fordson 7V, Fordson E83W, Fordson WOT, Fordson Thames ET, Ford Thames 300E, Ford Thames 307E, Ford Thames 400E, Thames Trader, Thames Trader NC, Ford K-Series	1931–2002, formerly principal Ford UK plant Vehicle Production ended in 2002, however, it continued to be a major engine plant in the UK.
	Dagenham Stamping & Tooling	Dagenham	England, UK	1931–2013	Body panels, wheels	
DA/F (NA)	Dearborn Assembly Plant	Dearborn, Michigan	U.S.	1928–2004	Ford Model A Ford Model B Ford Model 48; 1937 Ford; 1941 Ford; 1949 Ford; 1952 Ford; 1955 Ford; 1957 Ford; Mercury Eight; Ford Fairlane (full-size) (1955–1961); Ford Thunderbird; Ford Mustang; Mercury Cougar 1967–1973; Mercury Capri; Ford F-Series; Fordson tractors	Part of the River Rouge Complex. Replaced by Dearborn Truck Plant for 2005MY. This plant within the Rouge complex was demolished in 2008.
	Dearborn Iron Foundry	Dearborn, Michigan	U.S.	1928?-1974	Cast iron parts including engine blocks.	Part of the River Rouge Complex. Replaced by Michigan Casting Center in the early 1970s.
H (AU)	Eagle Farm Assembly Plant	Eagle Farm (Brisbane), Queensland	Australia	1926–1998	Ford Falcon; Ford Falcon Ute (including XY 4x4); Ford Fairlane; Ford LTD; Ford F-Series trucks Ford L-Series/Louisville/Aeromax trucks Ford Cargo; Ford Trader	Opened in 1926. Closed in 1998; demolished
ME/T (NA)	Edison Assembly	Edison, New Jersey	U.S.	1948–2004	Ford Ranger; Ford Ranger EV; Mazda B-Series; Ford Escort; Mercury Lynx; Ford Mustang; Mercury Cougar; Ford Pinto; Mercury Bobcat; Ford Falcon; Mercury Comet; Mercury Custom; Mercury Medalist; Mercury Montclair; Mercury Monterey; Mercury Park Lane; Mercury Turnpike Cruiser; Mercury Meteor	demolished in 2005. Also known as Metuchen Assembly.
	Essex Aluminum	Windsor, Ontario	Canada	1981–2012	3.8/4.2L V6 cylinder heads 4.6L, 5.4L V8 cylinder heads 6.8L V10 cylinder heads Pistons	Opened 1981. Sold to Nemak Aluminum (a 25/75 joint venture between Ford & Nemak, which is 75.24% owned by Alfa Group of Mexico) in 2001; shuttered in 2009 except for the melting operation which closed in 2012.
	Fairfax Transmission	Fairfax, Ohio	U.S.	1951?–1979	Ford-O-Matic/Merc-O-Matic/Lincoln Turbo-Drive; Cruise-O-Matic (FX transmission); FMX transmission	Located at 4000 Red Bank Road. Opened in 1950. Original Ford-O-Matic was a licensed design from the Warner Gear division of Borg-Warner. Also produced aircraft engine parts during the Korean War. Closed in 1979. Sold to Red Bank Distribution of Cincinnati in 1987. Transferred to Cincinnati Port Authority in 2006 after Cincinnati agreed not to sue the previous owner for environmental and general negligence. Redeveloped into Red Bank Village, a mixed-use commercial and office space complex, which opened in 2009 and includes a Wal-Mart.
T	Fiat Tychy Assembly	Tychy	Poland	2008–2016	Ford Ka; Fiat 500	Plant owned by Fiat. Production for Ford began in 2008.
	Foden Trucks	Sandbach, Cheshire	England, UK	1984 (Ceased Manufacturing)	Ford Transcontinental	Foden Trucks plant. Produced for Ford after Ford closed Amsterdam plant. 504 units produced by Foden. Factory closed in 2000.
	Ford Malaysia Sdn. Bhd	Selangor	Malaysia	Closed	Ford Laser; Ford Lynx; Ford Telstar; Ford Escape; Ford Ranger; Ford Econovan; Ford Spectron; Ford Trader; BMW 3-Series E46, E90; BMW 5-Series E60; Land Rover Defender; Land Rover Discovery	Originally known as AMIM (Associated Motor Industries Malaysia) Holdings Sdn. Bhd. which was owned 30% by Ford from the early 1980s. Previously, Associated Motor Industries Malaysia had assembled for various automotive brands including Ford but was not owned by Ford. In 2000, Ford increased its stake to 49% and renamed the company Ford Malaysia Sdn. Bhd. The other 51% was owned by Tractors Malaysia Bhd., a subsidiary of Sime Darby Bhd.
	Ford Motor Company Lamp Factory	Flat Rock, Michigan	U.S.	1923–1950	Automotive lighting	Located at 26601 W. Huron River Drive. Opened in 1923. Also produced junction boxes for the B-24 bomber as well as lighting for military vehicles during World War II. Closed in 1950. Sold to Moynahan Bronze Company in 1950. Sold to Stearns Manufacturing in 1972. Leased in 1981 to Flat Rock Metal Inc., which later purchased the building.
	Ford Philippines, Inc. Assembly Plant	Sucat, Muntinlupa	Philippines	Closed (August 1984)	Ford Cortina; Ford Escort; Ford Taunus; Ford Galaxie; Ford LTD; Ford Laser; Ford Telstar; American Ford trucks British Ford trucks Ford Fiera	Plant opened 1968.
	Ford Philippines, Inc. Stamping Plant	Mariveles, Bataan	Philippines	Closed (August 1984)	Stampings	Plant opened 1976.
	Ford Motor Co. d’Italia	Trieste	Italy	Closed (1931)	Ford Model T Ford Model A Fordson tractors	
	Ford Motor Company of Japan	Yokohama, Kanagawa Prefecture	Japan	Closed (1941)	Ford Model T Ford Model A 1932-1934 Ford; Ford Model Y	Founded in 1925. Factory was seized by Imperial Japanese Government.
T	Ford Motor Company del Peru	Lima	Peru	Closed	Ford Mustang (first generation); Ford Galaxie; Ford Taunus 17M; Ford F-Series	Opened in 1965.
	Ford Motor Company Philippines	Santa Rosa, Laguna	Philippines	Closed (December 2012)	Ford Lynx; Ford Focus; Mazda Protege; Mazda 3 Ford Escape; Mazda Tribute; Ford Ranger	Plant sold to Mitsubishi Motors
	Ford Motor Company Caribbean, Inc.	Canóvanas, Loíza	Commonwealth of Puerto Rico (U.S.)	Closed	Ball bearings	Plant opened in the 1960s. Constructed in land purchased from the Puerto Rico Industrial Development Company.
	Ford Motor Co. Rhodesia (Pvt.) Ltd.	Willowvale, Salisbury (now Harare)	(Southern Rhodesia) / Rhodesia (colony) / Rhodesia (country) (now Zimbabwe)	Sold in 1967 to state-owned Industrial Development Corporation	Ford Fairlane; Ford Fairlane; Ford Falcon; Ford F-100; Ford Galaxie; Ford Anglia; Ford Consul; Ford Consul Classic; Ford Corsair; Ford Cortina; Ford Zephyr; Ford Zodiac; Ford Thames 400E/800; Thames Trader; Ford Taunus P3; Ford Taunus P5; Ford Taunus Transit; Fordson Dexta tractors Fordson Super Major; Deutz F1M 414 tractor	Assembly began in 1961. Became Willowvale Motor Industries after the Ford sale. Became Willowvale Mazda Motor Industries from 1989 to 2014. Name went back to Willowvale Motor Industries in 2015.
	Ford Motor Co. (Singapore)	Bukit Timah	Singapore	Closed (1980)	Ford Anglia; Ford Consul; Ford Custom; Ford Corsair; Ford Cortina; Ford Escort; Ford Falcon; Ford Granada; Ford Prefect; Ford Zephyr; Ford Zodiac	Originally known as Ford Motor Company of Malaya Ltd. & subsequently as Ford Motor Company of Malaysia. Factory was originally on Anson Road, then moved to Prince Edward Road in Jan. 1930 before moving to Bukit Timah Road in April 1941. Factory wa occupied by Japan from 1942 to 1945 during World War II. It was then used by British military authorities until April 1947 when it was returned to Ford. Production resumed in December 1947.
	Ford Motor Company of South Africa Ltd. Struandale Assembly Plant	Struandale, Port Elizabeth	South Africa	Sold to Delta Motor Corporation (later GM South Africa) in 1994	Ford Model T Ford Model A Ford Falcon (North America); Ford Fairlane (Americas); Ford Galaxie; Ford Ranchero (American); Ford Anglia; Ford Prefect; Ford Capri; Ford Cortina; Ford Cortina Pickup/P100/Ford 1-Tonner; Ford Zephyr; Ford Zodiac; Ford Taunus P3; Ford Taunus (P5) 17M; Ford (Taunus P7) 17M/20M; Ford Granada; Ford Fairmont/Fairmont GT (XW, XY); Ford Ranchero (Falcon Ute-based) (XT, XW, XY, XA, XB); Ford Fairlane (Australia); Ford Escort/XR3/XR3i; Ford Bantam; Ford Transit	Ford first began production in South Africa in 1924 in a former wool store on Grahamstown Road in Port Elizabeth. Ford then moved to a larger location on Harrower Road in October 1930. In 1948, Ford moved again to a plant in Neave Township, Port Elizabeth. Struandale Assembly opened in 1974. Ford ended vehicle production in Port Elizabeth in December 1985, moving all vehicle production to Samcor's Silverton plant that had come from Sigma Motor Corp., the other partner in the Samcor merger.
	Ford Sollers Naberezhny Chelny Assembly Plant	Naberezhny Chelny	Russia	Closed (2019), JV with 50% owned by Sollers	Ford EcoSport; Ford Fiesta	
	Ford Sollers St. Petersburg Assembly Plant, previously Ford Motor Company ZAO	St. Petersburg	Russia	Closed (2019), JV with 50% owned by Sollers	Ford Focus; Ford Mondeo	
	Ford Sollers Yelabuga Assembly Plant	Yelabuga	Russia	Sold (2022). Originally a JV with 50% owned by Sollers. Restructured & renamed Sollers Ford in 2020 after Sollers increased its stake to 51% in 2019 with Ford owning 49%. Production suspended in 2022.	Ford Transit	Previously: Ford Explorer; Ford Galaxy; Ford Kuga; Ford S-Max; Ford Transit Custom; Ford Tourneo Custom; Ford Transit
	Ford Sollers Yelabuga Engine Plant	Yelabuga	Russia	Closed (2019), JV with 50% owned by Sollers	Ford 1.6L Duratec I4	
	Ford Union	Obchuk	Belarus	Closed (2000)	Ford Escort, Escort Van; Ford Transit	Ford Union was a joint venture which was 51% owned by Ford, 23% owned by distributor Lada-OMC, & 26% owned by the Belarus government. Production began in 1997.
	Ford-Vairogs	Riga	Latvia	Closed (1940). Nationalized following Soviet invasion & takeover of Latvia.	Ford-Vairogs Junior; Ford-Vairogs Taunus; Ford-Vairogs V8 Standard; Ford-Vairogs V8 De Luxe; Ford-Vairogs V8 3-ton trucks Ford-Vairogs buses	Produced vehicles under license from Ford's Copenhagen, Denmark division. Production began in 1937.
	Geelong Assembly	Norlane, Victoria	Australia	Closed	Ford Model T Ford Model A Ford Model Y Ford Model C Ten; 1932-1934 Ford; Ford Model 48/Model 68; 1937-1940 Ford; Mercury Eight (through 1948); Ford Prefect; Ford Anglia; 1941-1942 & 1946-1948 Ford; Ford Pilot; Ford Consul; Ford Zephyr; Ford Zodiac; 1949-1951 Ford Custom Fordor/Coupe Utility/Deluxe Coupe Utility; 1952-1954 Ford Customline sedan/Mainline Coupe Utility; 1955-1956 Ford Customline sedan/Mainline Coupe Utility; 1957-1959 Ford Custom 300/Fairlane 500/Ranch Wagon; Ford Freighter/F-Series	Production began in 1925 in a former wool storage warehouse in Geelong before moving to a new plant in the Geelong suburb that later became known as Norlane. Vehicle production later moved to Broadmeadows plant that opened in 1959.
	Geelong Aluminum Casting	Norlane, Victoria	Australia	Closed 2016	Aluminum cylinder heads, intake manifolds, and structural oil pans	Opened 1986.
	Geelong Iron Casting	Norlane, Victoria	Australia	Closed 2016	I6 engine blocks, camshafts, crankshafts, exhaust manifolds, bearing caps, disc brake rotors and flywheels	Opened 1972.
	Geelong Chassis Components	Norlane, Victoria	Australia	Closed 2004	Parts - Machine cylinder heads, suspension arms and brake rotors	Opened 1983.
	Geelong Engine	Norlane, Victoria	Australia	Closed 2016	Ford 302 & 351 Cleveland V8; Ford Australia Falcon I6; Ford Australia Barra I6	Opened 1926.
	Geelong Stamping	Norlane, Victoria	Australia	Closed 2016	Ford Falcon/Futura/Fairmont body panels Ford Falcon Utility body panels Ford Territory body panels	Opened 1926. Previously: Ford Fairlane body panels Ford LTD body panels Ford Capri body panels Ford Cortina body panels Welded subassemblies and steel press tools
B (EU)	Genk Body & Assembly	Genk	Belgium	Closed in 2014	Ford Mondeo; Ford S-MAX; Ford Galaxy	Opened in 1964. Previously: Ford Taunus P4; Ford Taunus P5; Ford Taunus P6; Ford Taunus P7; Ford Taunus TC; Ford Anglia Torino; Ford Escort; Ford Sierra; Ford Transit
	GETRAG FORD Transmissions Bordeaux Transaxle Plant	Blanquefort	France	Sold to Getrag/Magna Powertrain in 2021	Ford BC4/BC5 transmission Ford iB5 transmission (5MTT170/5MTT200); Ford Durashift-EST(iB5-ASM/5MTT170-ASM); MX65 transmission CTX CVT	Opened in 1976. Became a joint venture with Getrag in 2001. Joint Venture: 50% Ford Motor Company / 50% Getrag Transmission. Joint venture dissolved in 2021 and this plant was kept by Getrag, which was taken over by Magna Powertrain in 2015.
	Green Island Plant	Green Island, New York	U.S.	Closed (1989)	Radiators, springs	1922–1989, demolished in 2004
E (NA)	Halewood Body & Assembly	Halewood, Merseyside	England, UK	Sold (2008)	Ford Anglia, Ford Corsair, Ford Escort, Ford Capri, Ford Orion, Jaguar X-Type, Land Rover Freelander 2 / LR2	1963–2008. Ford assembly ended 2000, then transferred to Jaguar/Land Rover. Sold to Tata Group with Jaguar/Land Rover business
	Hamilton Plant	Hamilton, Ohio	U.S.	Closed (1950)	Fordson tractors/tractor components Wheels for cars like Model T & Model A Locks and lock parts Radius rods Running Boards	Opened in 1920. Factory used hydroelectric power. Switched from tractors to auto parts less than 6 months after production began. Also made parts for bomber engines during World War II. Plant closed in 1950. Sold to Bendix Aviation Corporation in 1951. Bendix closed the plant in 1962 and sold it in 1963 to Ward Manufacturing Co., which made camping trailers there. In 1975, it was sold to Chem-Dyne Corp., which used it for chemical waste storage & disposal. Demolished around 1981 as part of a Federal Superfund cleanup of the site.
	Heimdalsgade Assembly	Heimdalsgade street, Nørrebro district, Copenhagen	Denmark	Closed (1924)	Ford Model T	1919–1924. Was replaced by, at the time, Europe's most modern Ford-plant, "Sydhavnen Assembly".
HM/H (NA)	Highland Park Plant	Highland Park, Michigan	U.S.	1910–1981	Ford Model T Ford F-Series; Fordson tractors and tractor components	Model T production from 1910 to 1927. Continued to make automotive trim parts after 1927. One of the first 2 Ford plants to build the F-Series, beginning November 27, 1947 (other was Richmond, California). Ford Motor Company's third American factory. First automobile factory in history to utilize a moving assembly line (implemented October 7, 1913). Also made Sherman M4A3 tanks during World War II.
K (AU)	Homebush Assembly Plant	Homebush (Sydney), NSW	Australia	1936–1994	Ford Escort Mk. 1 & 2 Ford Capri Mk.1; Ford Fairlane (1962–1964); Ford Galaxie (1965–1968); Ford Laser; Ford Meteor; Ford Transit; Ford Mustang (conversion to right hand drive)	Opened in 1936, closed in September 1994
H (SA)	Horizonte (Troller Veículos Especiais)	Horizonte, Ceará	Brazil	2007-2021	Troller T4, Troller Pantanal	
	Hyundai Ulsan Plant	Ulsan	South Korea	Ford production ended in 1985. Licensing agreement with Ford ended.	Ford Cortina Mk2-Mk5; Ford P7; Ford Granada MkII; Ford D-750/D-800; Ford R-182	Hyundai Motor began by producing Ford models under license. Replaced by self developed Hyundai models.
	IMMSA	Monterrey, Nuevo Leon	Mexico	Closed (2000). Agreement with Ford ended.	Ford M450 motorhome chassis	Replaced by Detroit Chassis LLC plant.
	Indianapolis Steering Systems Plant	Indianapolis, IN	U.S.	1957–2011, demolished in 2017	Steering columns, Steering gears	Spun off as part of Visteon in 2000. Taken back by Ford in 2005 as part of Automotive Components Holdings LLC. Closed in 2011. Demolished in 2017.
	Industrias Chilenas de Automotores SA (Chilemotores)	Arica	Chile	Closed c.1969	Ford Falcon	Opened 1964. Was a 50/50 joint venture between Ford and Bolocco & Cia. Replaced by Ford's 100% owned Casablanca, Chile plant.
	Inokom	Kulim, Kedah	Malaysia	Ford production ended 2016	Ford Transit	Plant owned by Inokom
D	Ipiranga Assembly	Ipiranga, São Paulo	Brazil	Closed (2000)	CKD, Tractor, Ford F-Series, Ford Galaxie, Ford Landau, Ford LTD, Ford Cargo Trucks, Ford B-1618 & B-1621 bus chassis, Ford B12000 school bus chassis, VW Delivery, VW Worker, VW L80, VW Volksbus 16.180 CO bus chassis	Part of Autolatina venture with VW from 1987 to 1996.
	Ipiranga Engine	Ipiranga, São Paulo	Brazil	Closed	Ford 272 Y-block V8, Ford 292 Y-block V8	
	Istanbul Assembly	Tophane, Istanbul	Turkey	Production stopped in 1934 as a result of the Great Depression. Then handled spare parts and service for existing cars. Closed entirely in 1944.	Ford Model A 1932 Ford	Opened 1929.
	Jaguar Browns Lane plant	Coventry, West Midlands	England, UK	Closed (2007)	Jaguar XJ; Jaguar XJ-S; Jaguar XK8/XKR (X100); Daimler six-cylinder sedan (XJ40); Daimler Six (X300); Daimler Double Six; Daimler Eight/Super V8 (X308); Daimler Super Eight (X350/X356)	
	Jaguar Castle Bromwich Assembly	Castle Bromwich, West Midlands	England, UK	Sold (2008)	Jaguar S-Type; Jaguar XF (X250); Jaguar XJ (X356/X358); Jaguar XJ (X351); Jaguar XK (X150); Daimler Super Eight; Painted bodies for models made at Browns Lane	Sold to Tata Motors in 2008 as part of sale of Jaguar Land Rover.
	Jaguar Radford Engine	Radford, West Midlands	England, UK	Closed (1997)	Jaguar AJ6 engine Jaguar V12 engine Axles	Originally a Daimler site.
K (EU) / M	Karmann Rheine Assembly	Rheine, North Rhine-Westphalia	Germany	Closed in 2008 (Ford production ended in 1997)	Ford Escort Convertible; Ford Escort RS Cosworth; Merkur XR4Ti	Plant owned by Karmann
	Kechnec Transmission (Getrag Ford Transmissions)	Kechnec, Košice Region	Slovakia	Sold to Getrag/Magna Powertrain in 2019	Ford MPS6 transmissions Ford SPS6 transmissions	Ford/Getrag dual clutch transmission "Powershift", (Getrag Ford Transmissions)
6	Kia Sohari Plant	Gwangmyeong	South Korea	Ford production ended (2000)	Ford Festiva; Ford Aspire	Plant owned by Kia.
	La Boca Assembly	La Boca, Buenos Aires	Argentina	Closed (1961)	Ford Model T Ford Model A 1932 Ford; 1941 Ford; Ford F-Series (Gen 3); Ford B-600 bus Ford F-Series (Early Gen 4)	Replaced by the General Pacheco plant in 1961.
F	La Villa Assembly	La Villa, Mexico City	Mexico	Closed (1984)	1932 Ford; Ford Anglia; Ford Consul; Ford Taunus; Ford Falcon; Ford Falcon Maverick; Ford Fairmont/Elite II; Ford Galaxie; Ford LTD; Ford Thunderbird; Ford Mustang; Ford Mustang II	Replaced San Lazaro plant. Opened 1932.
A	Land Rover Solihull Assembly	Solihull, West Midlands	England, UK	Sold (2008)	Land Rover Defender; Land Rover Discovery; Land Rover Freelander; Land Rover LR3; Land Rover LR4; Land Rover Range Rover; Land Rover Range Rover Sport	Sold to Tata Motors in 2008 as part of sale of Jaguar Land Rover.
C (EU)	Langley Assembly	Langley, Slough	England, UK	Sold/closed (1986/1997)	Ford Transit and Ford A series vans; Ford D-Series and Ford Cargo trucks; Ford R-Series bus/coach chassis	1949–1986. Former Hawker aircraft factory. Sold to Iveco, closed 1997.
	Leamington Foundry	Leamington Spa, Warwickshire	England, UK	Closed (2007)	Castings including brake drums and discs, differential gear cases, flywheels, hubs and exhaust manifolds	Opened in 1940, closed in July 2007. Demolished 2012.
	Lincoln Motor Company Plant	Detroit, Michigan	U.S.	1917–1952	Lincoln L series Lincoln K series Lincoln Custom; Lincoln-Zephyr; Lincoln EL-series; Lincoln Cosmopolitan; Lincoln Capri (1952 only); Lincoln Continental (retroactively Mark I)	Located at 6200 West Warren Avenue at corner of Livernois. Built before Lincoln was part of Ford Motor Co. Ford kept some offices here after production ended in 1952. Sold to Detroit Edison in 1955. Eventually replaced by Wixom Assembly plant. Mostly demolished in 2002–2003.
LA	Los Angeles Branch Assembly Plant	Los Angeles, CA	U.S.	1914–1930	Original Los Angeles plant: Ford Model T. Ford Model A.	Now the headquarters of Warner Music Group.
J	Los Angeles Assembly	Pico Rivera, California	U.S.	1957–1980		
L	Long Beach Assembly	Long Beach, California	U.S.	1930–1958		
H (NA)	Lorain Assembly	Lorain, Ohio	U.S.	1958–2005	Ford Econoline	Operations transferred to Avon Lake. Previously: Ford Galaxie; Ford Ranchero; Ford Falcon; Mercury Comet; Ford Fairlane; Ford Torino; Mercury Montego; Mercury Cyclone; Ford LTD II; Ford Elite; Ford Thunderbird; Mercury Cougar; Ford F-Series; Mercury Econoline pickup
	Mack Avenue Plant	Detroit, Michigan	U.S.	1903–1941	Original Model As	1903–1904. Ford Motor Company's first factory (rented). An imprecise replica of the building is located at The Henry Ford.
E	Mahwah Assembly	Mahwah, New Jersey	U.S.	1955–1980	Last vehicles produced: Ford Fairmont; Mercury Zephyr	Ford F-Series; 1955 Ford; 1957 Ford; Edsel Pacer; Edsel Ranger; Ford Galaxie; Ford LTD; Ford Granada; Mercury Monarch; Lincoln Versailles
	Manukau Alloy Wheel	Manukau, Auckland	New Zealand	Sold (2001)	Aluminum wheels and cross members	Established 1981. Sold in 2001 to Argent Metals Technology
	Matford	Strasbourg	France	Closed	Mathis cars Matford V8 cars Matford trucks	Matford was a joint venture 60% owned by Ford and 40% owned by French automaker Mathis. Replaced by Ford's own Poissy plant after Matford was dissolved.
	Maumee Stamping	Maumee, Ohio	U.S.	Closed (2007)	body panels	Closed in 2007 sold and reopened as independent stamping plant
	MAVAG	Budapest	Hungary	Closed (1939)	Ford Eifel; Ford V8; Ford G917T	Opened 1938. Produced under license from Ford Germany. MAVAG was nationalized in 1946.
	Maywood Assembly	Maywood, California	U.S.	1948–1957	Mercury Eight, Mercury Custom, Mercury Montclair, Mercury Monterey, Lincoln EL-series, Lincoln Cosmopolitan, Lincoln Premiere, Lincoln Capri	Across the street from the Chrysler Los Angeles Assembly plant.
0	Mazda Hiroshima Assembly	Hiroshima, Hiroshima Prefecture	Japan	Ford production ended. Ford no longer owns a stake in Mazda.	Ford Courier; Ford Freda; Ford Econovan/Econowagon/Spectron; Ford Raider; Ford Trader	Plant owned by Mazda.
1	Mazda Hofu Assembly	Hofu, Yamaguchi Prefecture	Japan	Ford production ended. Ford no longer owns a stake in Mazda.	Ford Laser; Ford Telstar	Plant owned by Mazda.
	Metcon Casting (Metalurgica Constitución S.A.)	Villa Constitución, Santa Fe Province	Argentina	Sold to Paraná Metal SA	Parts - Iron castings	Originally opened in 1957. Bought by Ford in 1967.
	Monroe Stamping Plant	Monroe, Michigan	U.S.	Closed as a factory in 2008. Now a Ford warehouse.	Coil springs, wheels, stabilizer bars, catalytic converters, headlamp housings, and bumpers. Chrome Plating (1956–1982)	Originally built by Newton Steel around 1929 and subsequently owned by Alcoa and Kelsey-Hayes Wheel Co. Bought by Ford in 1949 and opened in 1950. Spun off as part of Visteon in 2000. Taken back by Ford in 2005 as part of Automotive Components Holdings LLC. Closed in 2008. Sold to parent Ford Motor Co. in 2009. Converted into Ford River Raisin Warehouse.
	Montevideo Assembly	Montevideo	Uruguay	Closed (1985)	Ford Escort; Ford Falcon; Ford F-Series; Ford D series	Plant was on Calle Cuaró. Opened 1920. Ford Uruguay S.A.
H	Multimatic Markham Assembly	Markham, Ontario	Canada	Closed with the end of Ford GT production (2022)	Ford GT	Plant owned by Multimatic
	Nissan Motor Australia	Clayton, Victoria	Australia	Closed (1992)	Ford Corsair (UA); Nissan Pintara; Nissan Skyline	Plant owned by Nissan. Ford production was part of the Button Plan.
NK/NR/N	Norfolk Assembly	Norfolk, Virginia	U.S.	Operated from 1925 to 2007	Ford F-Series	
	Ford Valve Plant	Northville, Michigan	U.S.	Closed (1981)	Engine valves for cars and tractors	Located at 235 East Main Street. Previously a gristmill purchased by Ford in 1919 that was reconfigured to make engine valves from 1920 to 1936. Replaced with a new purpose-built structure designed by Albert Kahn in 1936 which includes a waterwheel. Closed in 1981. Later used as a manufacturing plant by R&D Enterprises from 1994 to 2005 to make heat exchangers. Known today as the Water Wheel Centre, a commercial space that includes design firms and a fitness club. Listed on the National Register of Historic Places in 1995.
C (NA)	Ontario Truck	Oakville, Ontario	Canada	Closed (2004)	Ford F-Series; Ford F-150 Lightning SVT	Opened 1965. Previously: Mercury M-Series
	OSI	Turin	Italy	Closed (1967)	Ford Anglia Torino; OSI-Ford 20 M TS	Plant owned by OSI
	Ford Otosan Assembly	Istanbul	Turkey	Closed (2001)	Ford Consul; Ford Escort; Ford Taunus; Ford Transit; Ford F-600; Ford Cargo; Ford D series Ford Thames 800; Thames Trader; Otosan P100; Anadol	Opened 1960.
	Pacheco Truck Assembly and Painting Plant	General Pacheco, Buenos Aires Province	Argentina	Transferred to VW when Autolatina dissolved (1996)	Ford F-100/F-150; Ford F-250/F-350/F-400/F-4000; Ford F-600/F-6000/F-700/F-7000	Opened in 1982. Part of Autolatina venture with VW from 1987 to 1996. VW kept this side of the Pacheco plant when Autolatina dissolved and converted it to car production. VW has since then used this plant for Amarok pickup truck production.
U (EU)	Pininfarina Bairo Assembly	Bairo	Italy	Closed (2010)	Ford Focus Coupe-Cabriolet; Ford StreetKa	Plant owned by Pininfarina
	Piquette Avenue Plant	Detroit, Michigan	U.S.	1904–1910	Models B, C, F, K, N, R, S, and T	1904–1910. Ford Motor Company's second American factory (first owned). Concept of a moving assembly line experimented with and developed here before being fully implemented at Highland Park plant. Birthplace of the Model T (September 27, 1908). Sold to Studebaker in 1911. Sold to 3M in 1936. Sold to Cadillac Overall Company, a work clothes supplier, in 1968. Owned by Heritage Investment Company from 1989 to 2000. Sold to the Model T Automotive Heritage Complex in April 2000. Run as a museum since July 27, 2001. Oldest car factory building on Earth open to the general public. The Piquette Avenue Plant was added to the National Register of Historic Places in 2002, designated as a Michigan State Historic Site in 2003, and became a National Historic Landmark in 2006. The building has also been a contributing property for the surrounding Piquette Avenue Industrial Historic District since 2004. The factory's front façade was fully restored to its 1904 appearance and revealed to the public on September 27, 2008, the 100th anniversary of the completion of the first production Model T.
	Plonsk Assembly	Plonsk	Poland	Closed (2000)	Ford Escort; Ford Transit	Opened in 1995.
	Poissy Assembly (now the Stellantis Poissy Plant)	Poissy	France	Sold in 1954 to Simca	Ford F-472/F-472A (13CV) & F-998A (22CV); Ford Vedette; Ford Abeille; Ford Vendôme; Ford Comète; Ford F-198 T/F-598 T/F-698 W/Cargo F798WM/Remorqueur trucks French Ford based Simca models: Simca Vedette; Simca Ariane; Simca Miramas; Simca Comète	Ford France including the Poissy plant and all current and upcoming French Ford models was sold to Simca in 1954 and Ford took a 15.2% stake in Simca. In 1958, Ford sold its stake in Simca to Chrysler. In 1963, Chrysler increased their stake in Simca to a controlling 64% by purchasing stock from Fiat, and they subsequently extended that holding further to 77% in 1967. In 1970, Chrysler increased its stake in Simca to 99.3% and renamed it Chrysler France. In 1978, Chrysler sold its entire European operations including Simca to PSA Peugeot-Citroën and Chrysler Europe's models were rebranded as Talbot. Talbot production at Poissy ended in 1986 and the Talbot brand was phased out. Poissy went on to produce Peugeot and Citroën models. Poissy has therefore, over the years, produced vehicles for the following brands: Ford, Simca, Chrysler, Talbot, Peugeot, Citroën, DS Automobiles, Opel, and Vauxhall. Opel and Vauxhall are included due to their takeover by PSA Group in 2017 from General Motors.
	Recife Assembly	Recife, Pernambuco	Brazil	Closed	Ford Model T Ford Model A	Opened 1925. Brazilian branch assembly plant.
	Renault Australia	Heidelberg, Victoria	Australia	Factory closed in 1981	Ford Cortina wagon	Assembled by Renault Australia under a 3-year contract to Ford Australia beginning in 1977.
RH/R	Richmond Plant	Richmond, California	U.S.	1931–1955	Ford Model A, 1932 Ford, Ford Model 48, 1937 Ford, 1941 Ford, Ford GPW, Ford F-Series, 1949 Ford, 1952 Ford, 1955 Ford	One of the first two Ford plants to build the F-Series, beginning November 27, 1947 (other was Highland Park, Michigan).
	Ford Româna S.A.R.	Bucharest	Romania	Closed	Ford Model 48/Model 68 (1935–1936); Ford Model 74/78/81A/82A/91A/92A/01A/02A (1937–1940); Mercury Eight (1939–1940); Ford Marmon-Herrington (1939–1942); Fordson trucks (1938–1942)	Production of civilian vehicles ended in 1940 due to World War II. The factory continued production of military trucks until 1942, then did repair work only. The factory was nationalized by the Communist Romanian government in 1948.
	Romeo Engine	Romeo, Michigan	U.S.	Closed	Ford 6.2 L Boss V8; Ford 5.2 L V8	Made Ford tractors and engines, parts, and farm implements for tractors from 1973 until 1988. Reopened in 1990 making the Modular V8.
SFA/SFAA	San Francisco Branch Assembly Plant	San Francisco, CA	U.S.	1914–1931	Ford Model T	Demolished after the 1989 earthquake.
R	San Jose Assembly Plant	Milpitas, California	U.S.	1955–1983	Ford F-Series, Edsel Pacer, Edsel Ranger, Ford Pinto, Mercury Bobcat, Ford Escort, Ford EXP, Mercury Lynx, Mercury LN7, Ford Falcon, Ford Maverick, Mercury Comet, Ford Fairlane, Ford Torino, Mercury Montego, Ford Mustang, Mercury Cougar, Mercury Capri	Now the Great Mall of the Bay Area.
	San Lazaro Assembly Plant	San Lazaro, Mexico City	Mexico	1925-c.1932	Ford Model T, Ford Model A	First auto plant in Mexico opened in 1925. Replaced by La Villa plant in 1932.
	Sanand Vehicle Assembly Plant	Sanand, Gujarat	India	Closed (2021) Sold to Tata Motors in 2022.	Ford Figo; Ford Figo Aspire; Ford Freestyle	Opened March 2015
	Santiago Exposition Street Plant (Planta Calle Exposición 1258)	Calle Exposición, Santiago, Chile	Chile	1924-c.1962	Ford Model T, Ford Model A, 1932 Ford, Ford Model 48, 1941 Ford, 1949 Ford, Ford F-Series	First plant opened in Chile in 1924.
B (SA)	São Bernardo Assembly	São Bernardo do Campo, São Paulo (state)	Brazil	Closed Oct. 30, 2019 & Sold 2020	Ford Fiesta; Ford Cargo Trucks; Ford F-Series	Originally the Willys-Overland do Brazil plant. Bought by Ford in 1967. Part of Autolatina venture with VW from 1987 to 1996. No more Cargo Trucks produced in Brazil since 2019. Sold to Construtora São José Desenvolvimento Imobiliária. Previously: Ford Aero; Ford Belina; Ford Corcel; Ford Del Rey; Ford Itamaraty; Ford Jeep; Ford Rural; Ford F-75; Ford Maverick; Ford Pampa; Ford Courier; Ford Ka (BE146 & B402); Ford Escort; Ford Orion; Ford Verona; Volkswagen Apollo; Volkswagen Logus; Volkswagen Pointer; Ford tractors
	São Paulo city assembly plants	São Paulo, São Paulo (state)	Brazil	Closed	Ford Model T Ford Model A 1932 Ford; Ford tractors	First plant opened in 1919 on Rua Florêncio de Abreu, in São Paulo. Moved to a larger plant in Praça da República in São Paulo in 1920. Then moved to an even larger plant on Rua Solon, in the Bom Retiro neighborhood of São Paulo in 1921. Replaced by Ipiranga plant in 1953.
L (NZ)	Seaview Assembly Plant	Lower Hutt	New Zealand	Closed (1988)	Ford Model 68; 1937 Ford Model 78; Ford Model Y Ford Model C Ten; Ford 7W; Ford Anglia; Ford Prefect; Ford Consul Classic 315; Ford Consul; Ford Zephyr; Ford Zodiac; Ford Pilot; Ford Custom V8 Fordor; Ford Escort; Ford Cortina; Ford Sierra wagon Ford Telstar; Ford Falcon; Ford Thames 400E; Ford Transit; Fordson Major tractors	Opened in 1936, closed in 1988
S (EU)	Autoeuropa	Setúbal	Portugal	Sold to Volkswagen in 1999	Ford Galaxy (1995–2006); Volkswagen Sharan; SEAT Alhambra	
	Sheffield Aluminum Casting Plant	Sheffield, Alabama	U.S.	Closed (1983)	Die cast parts pistons transmission cases	Opened in 1958, closed in December 1983. Demolished 2008.
SR/S	Somerville Assembly	Somerville, Massachusetts	U.S.	1926–1958	Ford Model T Ford Model A 1932 Ford; 1941 Ford; 1949 Ford; 1952 Ford; 1955 Ford; Ford F-Series; Edsel Corsair; Edsel Citation	The only Edsel-only assembly line. Operations moved to Lorain, OH. Converted to Assembly Square Mall in 1980.
D	Southampton Body & Assembly	Southampton	England, UK	Closed (2013)	Ford Transit van	Former Supermarine aircraft factory, acquired 1953. Built Ford vans 1972 – July 2013
Z	St. Louis Assembly	Hazelwood, MO	U.S.	1948–2006	Ford Explorer; Mercury Mountaineer; Lincoln Aviator	Demolished in 2009.
X (NA)	St. Thomas Assembly	Talbotville, Ontario	Canada	Closed (2011)	Ford Crown Victoria; Lincoln Town Car (2008–2011); Mercury Grand Marquis; Mercury Marauder	Opened in 1967. Previously: Ford Falcon; Ford Maverick; Ford Pinto; Mercury Bobcat; Ford Fairmont; Mercury Zephyr; Ford Escort; Mercury Lynx; Ford EXP; Mercury LN7
	Stockholm Assembly	Free Port area (Frihamnen in Swedish), Stockholm	Sweden	Closed (1957)	Ford Consul; Ford Prefect; Ford Vedette; Ford trucks	
5	Swedish Motor Assemblies	Kuala Lumpur	Malaysia	Sold 2010	Volvo S40; Volvo V40; Volvo V50; Volvo S60; Volvo S70; Volvo S80; Volvo V70; Volvo XC90; Land Rover Defender; Land Rover Discovery; Land Rover Freelander	Also built Volvo trucks and buses. Used to do contract assembly for other automakers including Suzuki and Daihatsu. Volvo Cars was sold to Geely Holding Group in 2010.
	Sydhavnen Assembly	Sydhavnen district, Copenhagen	Denmark	Closed (1966)	Ford Model T Ford Model A 1932 Ford; Ford Junior; Ford Junior De Luxe; Ford Eifel; Ford Taunus; Ford Anglia; Ford Thames 400E	1924–1966. 325,482 vehicles were built. Plant was then converted into a tractor assembly plant for Ford Industrial Equipment Co. Tractor plant closed in the mid-1970's. Administration & depot building next to assembly plant was used until 1991 when depot for remote storage closed & offices moved to Glostrup. Assembly plant building stood until 2006 when it was demolished.
	Taubate Engine & Transmission & Chassis Plant	Taubaté, São Paulo, Av. Charles Schnneider, 2222	Brazil	Closed 2021 & Sold 05.18.2022	Ford Pinto/Lima 2.3L I4; Ford Zetec RoCam engine Ford Sigma engine 1.5L Ti-VCT Dragon 3-cyl. iB5 5-speed manual transmission MX65 5-speed manual transmission aluminum casting Chassis components	Opened in 1974. Sold to Construtora São José Desenvolvimento Imobiliária https://construtorasaojose.com
	Thai Motor Co.	?	Thailand	Closed	Ford Capri | Ford Cortina	Factory was a joint venture between Ford UK & Ford's Thai distributor, Anglo-Thai Motors Company. Taken over by Ford in 1973 when it was renamed Ford Thailand, closed in 1976 when Ford left Thailand.
4	Thai-Swedish Assembly Co. Ltd.	Samutprakarn	Thailand	Plant no longer used by Volvo Cars. Sold to Volvo AB in 2011. Production consolidated to Malaysia plant.	Volvo 200 Series; Volvo 940; Volvo S40/V40; Volvo S70; Volvo S60; Volvo S80; Volvo V70; Volvo XC90; Land Rover Freelander; Volvo Trucks; Volvo Buses	Was 56% owned by Volvo and 44% owned by Swedish Motor. Volvo Cars was sold in 2010.
J (NA)	TH!NK Nordic AS	Aurskog	Norway	Sold (2003)	Ford Think City	Sold to Kamkorp Microelectronics as of February 1, 2003
	Tlalnepantla Tool & Die	Tlalnepantla, Mexico State	Mexico	Closed 1985	Tooling for vehicle production	Was previously a Studebaker-Packard assembly plant. Bought by Ford in 1962 and converted into a tool & die plant. Operations transferred to Cuautitlan at the end of 1985.
	Ford Trafford Park Factory	Trafford Park	England, UK	Closed	Ford Model T, Ford Model A	1911–1931, formerly principal Ford UK plant. Produced Rolls-Royce Merlin aircraft engines during World War II.
	Transax, S.A.	Córdoba, Córdoba Province	Argentina	Transferred to VW when Autolatina dissolved (1996)	Transmissions; Axles	Bought by Ford in 1967 from IKA. Part of Autolatina venture with VW from 1987 to 1996. VW kept this plant when Autolatina dissolved. VW has since then used this plant for transmission production.
P	Twin Cities Assembly Plant	St. Paul, MN	U.S.	1925–2011	Ford Ranger; Mazda B-Series	
	Volkswagen São Bernardo Assembly (Anchieta)	São Bernardo do Campo, São Paulo (state)	Brazil	Returned to VW do Brazil when Autolatina dissolved in 1996	Ford Versailles/Ford Galaxy (Argentina); Ford Royale; Volkswagen Santana; Volkswagen Quantum	Part of Autolatina venture between Ford and VW from 1987 to 1996.
J	Volvo AutoNova Plant	Uddevalla	Sweden	Sold to Pininfarina Sverige AB	Volvo C70	AutoNova was originally a 49/51 joint venture between Volvo & TWR. Restructured into Pininfarina Sverige AB, a new joint venture with Pininfarina to build the 2nd generation C70.
2	Volvo Ghent Plant	Ghent	Belgium	Sold	Volvo C30; Volvo S40; Volvo S60; Volvo S70; Volvo V40; Volvo V50; Volvo V70; Volvo XC70; Volvo XC60	Sold as part of sale of Volvo Cars to Geely
F	Volvo Nedcar Plant	Born	Netherlands	Sold (2001)	Volvo S40; Volvo V40; Mitsubishi Carisma; Mitsubishi Space Star	Taken over by Mitsubishi Motors in 2001, and later by VDL Groep in 2012, when it became VDL Nedcar. Volvo production ended in 2004.
J	Volvo Pininfarina Sverige Plant	Uddevalla	Sweden	Closed by Volvo after the Geely takeover	Volvo C70	Pininfarina Sverige was a 40/60 joint venture between Volvo & Pininfarina. Sold by Ford as part of sale of Volvo Cars to Geely in 2010. Volvo bought back Pininfarina's shares in 2013 and closed the Uddevalla plant after C70 production ended later in 2013.
	Volvo Skövde Engine Plant	Skövde	Sweden	Sold	Volvo Modular engine Volvo D5 engine PSA/Ford-based 2.0/2.2 diesel I4	Sold as part of sale of Volvo Cars to Geely
1	Volvo Torslanda Plant	Torslanda	Sweden	Sold	Volvo S60; Volvo S70; Volvo S80; Volvo V60; Volvo V70; Volvo XC70; Volvo XC90	Sold as part of sale of Volvo Cars to Geely
	Vulcan Forge	Dearborn, Michigan	U.S.	Closed (2003)	Connecting rods and rod cap forgings	
H (NA)	Walkerville Plant	Windsor, Ontario (Walkerville was taken over by Windsor in Sept. 1929)	Canada	Closed (1953) and vacant land next to Detroit River (Fleming Channel). Replaced by Oakville Assembly.	Ford Model C Ford Model N Ford Model K Ford Model T Ford Model A 1932 Ford; Ford Model 48; 1937 Ford; 1941 Ford; 1946-1947 Mercury trucks 1949 Ford; 1952 Ford; Meteor; Monarch; Ford F-Series; Mercury M-Series	1904–1953. First factory to produce Ford cars outside the USA (via Ford Motor Company of Canada, a separate company from Ford at the time).
	Walton Hills Stamping	Walton Hills, Ohio	U.S.	Closed Winter 2014	Body panels	
	Willowvale Motor Industries	Willowvale, Harare	Zimbabwe	Ford production ended.	Ford Laser; Mazda 323; Mazda Rustler; Mazda B series Mazda T3500	Assembly began in 1961 as Ford of Rhodesia. Became Willowvale Motor Industries after the Ford sale to the state-owned Industrial Development Corporation. Became Willowvale Mazda Motor Industries from 1989 to 2014. Name went back to Willowvale Motor Industries in 2015.
	Windsor Aluminum	Windsor, Ontario	Canada	Sold	Duratec V6 engine blocks Ford 3.9L V8 engine blocks Ford Modular engine blocks	Opened 1992. Sold to Nemak Aluminum (a 25/75 joint venture between Ford & Nemak, which is 75.24% owned by Alfa Group of Mexico) in 2001. Subsequently produced engine blocks for GM. Production ended in September 2020.
	Windsor Casting	Windsor, Ontario	Canada	1934–2007	Engine parts: Cylinder blocks, crankshafts	Opened 1934.
Y (NA)	Wixom Assembly Plant	Wixom, Michigan	U.S.	Idle (2007); torn down (2013)	Lincoln Continental; Lincoln Mark series (Mark III - Mark VIII); Lincoln Town Car; Lincoln LS; Ford GT; Ford Thunderbird; Ford GT40 MKIV; Lincoln Capri; 1960 Lincoln; Lincoln Premiere; Lincoln Continental Mark III/IV/V	Demolished in 2012.
	Ypsilanti Plant	Ypsilanti, Michigan	U.S.	Sold	Starters; Starter Assemblies; Alternators ignition coils distributors horns struts air conditioner clutches bumper shock devices	Located at 128 Spring St. Originally owned by Ford Motor Company, it then became a Visteon Plant when Visteon was spun off in 2000, and later turned into an Automotive Components Holdings Plant in 2005. It is said that Henry Ford used to walk this factory when he acquired it in 1932. The Ypsilanti Plant was closed in 2009. Demolished in 2010. The UAW Local was Local 849.

== Former branch assembly plants ==
VIN	Name	City/state	Country	Period of Operation	Former Address	Products	Comments
A/AA	Atlanta Assembly Plant (Poncey-Highland)	Poncey-Highland, Georgia	U.S.	1915–1942	Originally 465 Ponce de Leon Ave. but was renumbered as 699 Ponce de Leon Ave. in 1926.	Ford Model T, Ford Model A, 1932 Ford, Ford Model 48, 1937 Ford, 1941 Ford	Southeast USA headquarters and assembly operations from 1915 to 1942. Assembly ceased in 1932 but resumed in 1937. Sold to US War Dept. in 1942. Replaced by new plant in Atlanta suburb of Hapeville (Atlanta Assembly), which opened in 1947. Added to the National Register of Historic Places in 1984. Sold in 1979 and redeveloped into mixed retail/residential complex called Ford Factory Square/Ford Factory Lofts.
BO/BF/B	Buffalo Branch Assembly Plant	Buffalo, NY	U.S.	1913–1958	Originally located at Kensington Ave. and Eire Railroad. (1913–1915) Moved to 2495 Main St. at Rodney in December 1915. (1915–1931) Moved to 901 Fuhmann Boulevard in 1931. (1931–1938)	Ford Model T, Ford Model A, 1932 Ford, Ford Model 48, 1937 Ford, 1941 Ford, 1949 Ford, 1952 Ford, 1955 Ford, 1957 Ford, Ford F-Series	Assembly ceased in January 1933 but resumed in 1934. Operations moved to Lorain, Ohio. 2495 Main St. is now the Tri-Main Center. Previously made diesel engines for the Navy and Bell Aircraft Corporation, was used by Bell Aircraft to design and construct America's first jet engine warplane, and made windshield wipers for Trico Products Co. 901 Fuhmann Boulevard used as a port terminal by Niagara Frontier Transportation Authority after Ford sold the property.
	Burnaby Assembly Plant	Burnaby, BC	Canada	1938–1968	Was located at 4600 Kingsway	1937 Ford, 1941 Ford, 1949 Ford, 1952 Ford, 1955 Ford, 1957 Ford	Building demolished in 1988 to build Station Square
	Cambridge Branch Assembly Plant	Cambridge, MA	U.S.	1914–1926	640 Memorial Dr. and Cottage Farm Bridge	Ford Model T	Had the first vertically integrated assembly line in the world. Replaced by Somerville plant in 1926. Renovated, currently home to Boston Biomedical.
CE	Charlotte Branch Assembly Plant	Charlotte, NC	U.S.	1914–1933	222 North Tryon then moved to 210 E. Sixth St. in 1916 and again to 1920 Statesville Ave in 1924	Ford Model T, Ford Model A, 1932 Ford	Closed in March 1933, Used by Douglas Aircraft to assemble missiles for the U.S. Army between 1955 and 1964, sold to Atco Properties in 2017
	Chicago Branch Assembly Plant	Chicago, Illinois	U.S.	1914–1924	3915 Wabash Avenue	Ford Model T	Replaced by current Chicago Assembly Plant on Torrence Ave. in 1924.
CI	Cincinnati Branch Assembly Plant	Cincinnati, OH	U.S.	1915–1938	660 Lincoln Ave	Ford Model T, Ford Model A, 1932 Ford, Ford Model 48, 1937 Ford	Added to the National Register of Historic Places in 1989, renovated 2002, currently owned by Cincinnati Children's Hospital.
CL/CLE/CLEV	Cleveland Branch Assembly Plant	Cleveland, OH	U.S.	1915–1932	11610 Euclid Ave.	Ford Model T, Ford Model A, 1932 Ford	Added to the National Register of Historic Places in 1976, renovated, currently home to Cleveland Institute of Art.
G	Columbus Branch Assembly Plant	Columbus, OH	U.S.	1914–1932	427 Cleveland Avenue	Ford Model T, Ford Model A, 1932 Ford	Assembly ended March 1932. Factory closed 1939. Was the Kroger Co. Columbus Bakery until February 2019.
JE (JK)	Commodore Point	Jacksonville, Florida	U.S.	1924–1932	1900 Wambolt Street. At the Foot of Wambolt St. on the St. John's River next to the Mathews Bridge.	Ford Model T, Ford Model A cars and trucks, 1932 Ford	1924–1932, production years. Parts warehouse until 1968. Planned to be demolished in 2023.
DS/DL/D	Dallas Branch Assembly Plant	Dallas, TX	U.S.	1914 to 1970	2700 Canton St then moved in 1925 to 5200 E. Grand Ave. near Fair Park	Ford Model T Ford Model A 1932 Ford; Ford Model 48; 1937 Ford; 1941 Ford; Ford GPW; 1949 Ford; 1952 Ford; 1955 Ford; 1957 Ford; Ford F-Series	Assembly stopped February 1933 but resumed in 1934. Ford continued to use 2700 Canton St. for display and storage until 1939. In 1942, sold to Peaslee-Gaulbert Corporation, which had already been using the building since 1939. Sold to Adam Hats in 1959. Redeveloped in 1997 into Adam Hats Lofts, a loft-style apartment complex. 5200 E. Grand Ave. is now a warehouse.
T	Danforth Avenue Assembly	Toronto, Ontario	Canada	1922–1946	2951-2991 Danforth Ave.	Ford Model T Ford Model A and other cars	Replaced by Oakville Assembly. Sold to Nash Motors in 1946 which then merged with Hudson Motor Car Company to form American Motors Corporation, which then used the plant until it was closed in 1957. Converted to a mall in 1962, Shoppers World Danforth. The main building of the mall ( now a Lowe's) is still the original structure of the factory.
DR	Denver Branch Assembly Plant	Denver, CO	U.S.	1914 to 1933	900 South Broadway	Ford Model T, Ford Model TT, Ford Model A, 1932 Ford	Sold to Gates Rubber Co. in 1945. Gates sold the building in 1995. Now used as office space. Partly used as a data center by Hosting.com, now known as Ntirety, from 2009.
DM	Des Moines Assembly Plant	Des Moines, IA	U.S.	1920–1932	1800 Grand Avenue	Ford Model T, Ford Model A, 1932 Ford	Sold in 1943. Renovated in the 1980s into Des Moines School District's technical high school and central campus.
	Dothan Branch Assembly Plant	Dothan, AL	U.S.	1923–1927?	193 South Saint Andrews Street and corner of E. Crawford Street	Ford Model T	Later became an auto dealership called Malone Motor Company and was St. Andrews Market, an indoor market and event space, from 2013-2015 until a partial roof collapse during a severe storm. Since 2020, being redeveloped into an apartment complex. The curved assembly line anchored into the ceiling is still intact and is being left there. Sometimes called the Ford Malone Building.
	Dupont St Branch Assembly Plant	Toronto, ON	Canada	1915–1925	672 Dupont St	Ford Model T	Production moved to Danforth Assembly Plant. Building roof was used as a test track for the Model T. Used by several food processing companies. Became Planters Peanuts Canada from 1948 till 1987. The building currently is used for commercial and retail space. Included on the Inventory of Heritage Properties.
E/EG/E	Edgewater Assembly	Edgewater, New Jersey	U.S.	1930–1955	309 River Road	Ford Model A 1932 Ford; Ford Model 48; 1937 Ford; 1941 Ford; Ford GPW; 1949 Ford; 1952 Ford; 1955 Ford; Ford F-Series	Replaced with the Mahwah Assembly Plant. Added to the National Register of Historic Places on September 15, 1983. The building was torn down in 2006 and replaced with a residential development.
	Fargo Branch Assembly Plant	Fargo, ND	U.S.	1915–1917	505 N. Broadway	Ford Model T	After assembly ended, Ford used it as a sales office, sales and service branch, and a parts depot. Ford sold the building in 1956. Now called the Ford Building, a mixed commercial/residential property.
	Fort Worth Assembly Plant	Fort Worth, TX	U.S.	1916-1916		Ford Model T	Briefly supplemented Dallas plant but production was then reconsolidated into the Dallas plant and Fort Worth plant was closed.
H	Houston Branch Assembly Plant	Houston, TX	U.S.	1914–1932	3906 Harrisburg Boulevard	Ford Model T, Ford Model A, 1932 Ford, aircraft parts during WWII	Divested during World War II; later acquired by General Foods in 1946 (later the Houston facility for Maxwell House) until 2006 when the plant was sold to Maximus and rebranded as the Atlantic Coffee Solutions facility. Atlantic Coffee Solutions shut down the plant in 2018 when they went out of business. Leased by Elemental Processing in 2019 for hemp processing with plans to begin operations in 2020.
I	Indianapolis Branch Assembly Plant	Indianapolis, IN	U.S.	1914–1932	1315 East Washington Street	Ford Model T, Ford Model A, 1932 Ford	Vehicle production ended in December 1932. Used as a Ford parts service and automotive sales branch and for administrative purposes until 1942. Sold in 1942.
KC/K	Kansas City Assembly	Kansas City, Missouri	U.S.	1912–1956	Original location from 1912 to 1956 at 1025 Winchester Avenue & corner of E. 12th Street	Ford Model T, Ford Model A, 1932 Ford, Ford Model 48, 1937 Ford, 1941 Ford, 1949 Ford, 1952 Ford, 1955 Ford, 1957 Ford, Ford F-Series	First Ford factory in the USA built outside the Detroit area. Location of first UAW strike against Ford and where the 20 millionth Ford vehicle was assembled. Last vehicle produced was a 1957 Ford Fairlane Custom 300 on December 28, 1956. 2,337,863 vehicles were produced at the Winchester Ave. plant. Replaced by Claycomo plant in 1957.
KY	Kearny Assembly	Kearny, New Jersey	U.S.	1918–1930	135 Central Ave., corner of Ford Lane	Ford Model T, Ford Model A	Replaced by the Edgewater Assembly Plant.
	Long Island City Branch Assembly Plant	Long Island City, Queens, NY	U.S.	1912–1917	564 Jackson Ave. (now known as 33-00 Northern Boulevard) and corner of Honeywell St.	Ford Model T	Replaced by the Kearny Assembly Plant. Plant taken over by U.S. Government. Later occupied by E.R. Squibb & Son. Now called The Center Building.
LE/LU/U	Louisville Branch Assembly Plant	Louisville, Kentucky	U.S.	1913–present	931 South Third Street then 2400 South Third Street then 1400 Southwestern Parkway then 2000 Fern Valley Rd.		Original location opened in 1913. Ford then moved in 1916 and again in 1925. First 2 plants made the Ford Model T. The third plant made the Ford Model T, Ford Model A, 1932 Ford, Ford Model 48, 1937 Ford, 1941 Ford, 1949 Ford, 1952 Ford, Ford F-Series as well as Jeeps (Ford GPW), military trucks, and V8 engines during World War II. Current location at 2000 Fern Valley Rd. first opened in 1955. The South Third Street location was sold to Reynolds Metals Company and has since been converted into residential space called Reynolds Lofts under lease from current owner, University of Louisville.
MEM/MP/M	Memphis Branch Assembly Plant	Memphis, TN	U.S.	1913–1958	495 Union Ave. (1913–1924) then 1429 Riverside Blvd. and South Parkway West (1924–1933, 1935–1958)	Ford Model T, Ford Model A, 1932 Ford, Ford Model 48, 1937 Ford, 1941 Ford, 1949 Ford, 1952 Ford, 1955 Ford, 1957 Ford, Ford F-Series	Both plants have been demolished.
	Milwaukee Branch Assembly Plant	Milwaukee, WI	U.S.	1916–1932	2185 N. Prospect Ave.	Ford Model T, Ford Model A, 1932 Ford	Building is still standing as a mixed use development.
TC/SP	Minneapolis Branch Assembly Plant	Minneapolis, MN	U.S.	1912–1925	616 S. Third St in Minneapolis (1912–1914) then 420 N. Fifth St. in Minneapolis (1914–1925) and 117 University Ave. West in St. Paul (1914–1920)		420 N. Fifth St. is now called Ford Center, an office building. Was the tallest automotive assembly plant at 10 stories. University Ave. plant in St. Paul is now called the Ford Building. After production ended, was used as a Ford sales and service center, an auto mechanics school, a warehouse, and Federal government offices. Bought by the State of Minnesota in 1952 and used by the state government until 2004.
M	Montreal Assembly Plant	Montreal, QC	Canada	1916–1932	119-139 Laurier Avenue East		
NO	New Orleans	Arabi, Louisiana	U.S.	1923–1932	7200 North Peters Street, Arabi, St. Bernard Parish, Louisiana	Ford Model T, Ford Model TT, Ford Model A	Later used by Ford as a parts and vehicle dist. center. Used by the US Army as a warehouse during WWII. After the war, was used as a parts and vehicle dist. center by a Ford dealer, Capital City Ford of Baton Rouge. Used by Southern Service Co. to prepare Toyotas and Mazdas prior to their delivery into Midwestern markets from 1971 to 1977. Became a freight storage facility for items like coffee, twine, rubber, hardwood, burlap and cotton from 1977 to 2005. Flooded during Hurricane Katrina. Listed on the National Register of Historic Places in 2018.
OC	Oklahoma City Branch Assembly Plant	Oklahoma City, OK	U.S.	1916–1932	900 West Main St.	Ford Model T Ford Model A 1932 Ford	Had extensive access to rail via the Rock Island railroad. Production ended with the 1932 models. The plant was converted to a Ford Regional Parts Depot (1 of 3 designated “slow-moving parts branches") and remained so until 1967, when the plant closed, and was then sold in 1968 to The Fred Jones Companies, an authorized re-manufacturer of Ford and later on, also GM Parts. It remained the headquarters for operations of Fred Jones Enterprises (a subsidiary of The Fred Jones Companies) until Hall Capital, the parent of The Fred Jones Companies, entered into a partnership with 21c Hotels to open a location in the building. The 21c Museum Hotel officially opened its hotel, restaurant and art museum in June, 2016 following an extensive remodel of the property. Listed on the National Register of Historic Places in 2014.
	Omaha Ford Motor Company Assembly Plant	Omaha, NE	U.S.	1916–1932	1502-24 Cuming St.	Ford Model T, Ford Model A, 1932 Ford	Used as a warehouse by Western Electric Company from 1956 to 1959. It was then vacant until 1963, when it was used for manufacturing hair accessories and other plastic goods by Tip Top Plastic Products from 1963 to 1986. After being vacant again for several years, it was then used by Good and More Enterprises, a tire warehouse and retail outlet. After another period of vacancy, it was redeveloped into Tip Top Apartments, a mixed-use building with office space on the first floor and loft-style apartments on the upper levels which opened in 2005. Listed on the National Register of Historic Places in 2004.
CR/CS/C	Philadelphia Branch Assembly Plant (Chester Assembly)	Philadelphia, PA; Chester, Pennsylvania	U.S.	1914–1961	Philadelphia: 2700 N. Broad St., corner of W. Lehigh Ave. (November 1914-June 1927) then in Chester: Front Street from Fulton to Pennell streets along the Delaware River (800 W. Front St.) (March 1928-February 1961)	Ford Model A, 1932 Ford, Ford Model 48, 1937 Ford, 1941 Ford, Ford GPW, 1949 Ford, 1952 Ford, 1955 Ford, 1957 Ford, Ford F-Series (first generation), Ford F-Series (second generation), Ford F-Series (third generation)	November 1914-June 1927 in Philadelphia then March 1928-February 1961 in Chester. Broad St. plant made equipment for US Army in WWI including helmets and machine gun trucks. Sold in 1927. Later used as a Sears warehouse and then to manufacture men's clothing by Joseph H. Cohen & Sons, which later took over Botany 500, whose suits were then also made at Broad St., giving rise to the nickname, Botany 500 Building. Cohen & Sons sold the building in 1989 which seems to be empty now. Chester plant also handled exporting to overseas plants.
P	Pittsburgh Branch Assembly Plant	Pittsburgh, PA	U.S.	1915–1932	5000 Baum Blvd and Morewood Ave.	Ford Model T, Ford Model A, 1932 Ford	Became a Ford sales, parts, and service branch until Ford sold the building in 1953. The building then went through a variety of light industrial uses before being purchased by the University of Pittsburgh Medical Center (UPMC) in 2006. It was subsequently purchased by the University of Pittsburgh in 2018 to house the UPMC Immune Transplant and Therapy Center, a collaboration between the university and UPMC. Listed on the National Register of Historic Places in 2018.
PO	Portland Branch Assembly Plant	Portland, OR	U.S.	1914–1917 1923–1932	2505 SE 11th Avenue	Ford Model T, Ford Model A, 1932 Ford	Called the Ford Building and is occupied by various businesses.
AS	Seattle Branch Assembly Plant #1	South Lake Union, Seattle, WA	U.S.	1914–1932	1155 Valley Street & corner of 700 Fairview Ave. N.	Ford Model T, Ford Model A, 1932 Ford	Now a Public Storage site.
AS	Seattle Branch Assembly Plant #2	Georgetown, Seattle, WA	U.S.	1932–1932	4730 East Marginal Way	1932 Ford	Listed on the National Register of Historic Places in 2013.
STL/SL	St. Louis Branch Assembly Plant	St. Louis, MO	U.S.	1914–1942	4100 Forest Park Ave.		
V	Vancouver Assembly Plant	Vancouver, BC	Canada	1920–1938	1188 Hamilton St	Ford Model T, Ford Model A, 1932 Ford, Ford Model 48, 1937 Ford	Production moved to Burnaby plant in 1938. Still standing; used as commercial space.
W	Winnipeg Assembly Plant	Winnipeg, MB	Canada	1915–1941	1181 Portage Avenue (corner of Wall St.)	Ford Model T, Ford Model A, 1932 Ford, Ford Model 48, 1937 Ford, 1941 Ford, military trucks	Bought by Manitoba provincial government in 1942. Became Manitoba Technical Institute. Now known as the Robert Fletcher Building

== See also ==
- List of former automotive manufacturing facilities
- History of Ford Motor Company
- List of Mazda facilities
- List of General Motors factories
- List of Chrysler factories
- List of Fiat Group assembly sites
