= Blue Oval (disambiguation) =

Blue Oval may refer to:

- Ford Motor Company (nicknamed "Blue Oval"), a U.S. car company
- Blue Oval logo, the logo of the Ford Motor Company
- Blue Oval City, Stanton, Tennessee, USA; a Ford Motor Company car factory

== See also ==
- Steel Blue Oval, Bassendean, Western Australia, Australia; a sports stadium
