= Essex Aluminum =

Coordinates: 42°18′10″N 82°56′31″W

Essex Aluminum Plant is a former Ford Motor Company metal casting plant in Windsor, Ontario, Canada. It opened in 1981, and produced aluminum cylinder heads and pistons for various Ford engine plants. In 2001, the plant was sold to Nemak, a joint venture between Ford and Mexican industrial conglomerate Alfa. With Nemak's consolidation of its operations in 2009, the plant was closed except for the melting operation, which closed in 2012.

== See also ==
- List of Ford factories
