= Tennessee Truck Assembly =

Automotive assembly plant in Stanton, Tennessee, U.S.

Tennessee Truck Assembly Plant
- Built: 2020s
- Operated: 2029 (estimated)
- Location: Stanton, Tennessee, United States
- Coordinates: 35.41°N 89.42°W
- Industry: Automotive
- Products: gas-powered pickup trucks
- Employees: 100 (early 2026)
- Area: 3,600 acres (1,500 ha) (estimated)
- Owner: Ford Motor Company

Tennessee Truck Plant is an planned automobile manufacturing plant owned by Ford Motor Company located on the former site of the BlueOval City campus near Stanton, Tennessee, United States. Originally intended to manufacture the next-generation Ford F-150 Lightning electric pickup truck, the plant will produce gasoline and hybrid trucks in 2029.

As part of the $5.6 billion BlueOval City campus project, it will employ approximately more than 2,300 people when completed. It was not yet represented by the United Auto Workers.

== History ==
On September 27, 2021, the automotive plant was jointly announced by Ford Motor Company and SK Innovation as "Tennessee Electric Vehicle Center", as part of the BlueOval City project. The 3,600-acre plant will be constructed on the 4,100-acre (1,700 ha) Memphis Regional Megasite, also known as the West Tennessee Megasite, which was designated as an industrial site in September 2009.

The plant is accessible from Interstate 40. The state was initially expected to provide approximately $500 million worth of incentives that include infrastructure improvements, grants, and a new campus operated by the Tennessee College of Applied Technology (TCAT) to train workers for the plants, including Tennessee Electric Vehicle Center. The final cost ballooned to $884 million.

On December 15, 2025, Ford announced that it was repurposing the Tennessee Electric Vehicle Center at its BlueOval City campus. Renamed the Tennessee Truck Plant, the facility will now manufacture gas-powered trucks instead of the originally planned next-generation electric pickup trucks. Also, the former battery plant on the BlueOval City campus became SK On Tennessee.

== See also ==
- List of Ford factories
- List of automotive assembly plants in the United States
