= Ford Model 48 =

Ford car introduced in 1935

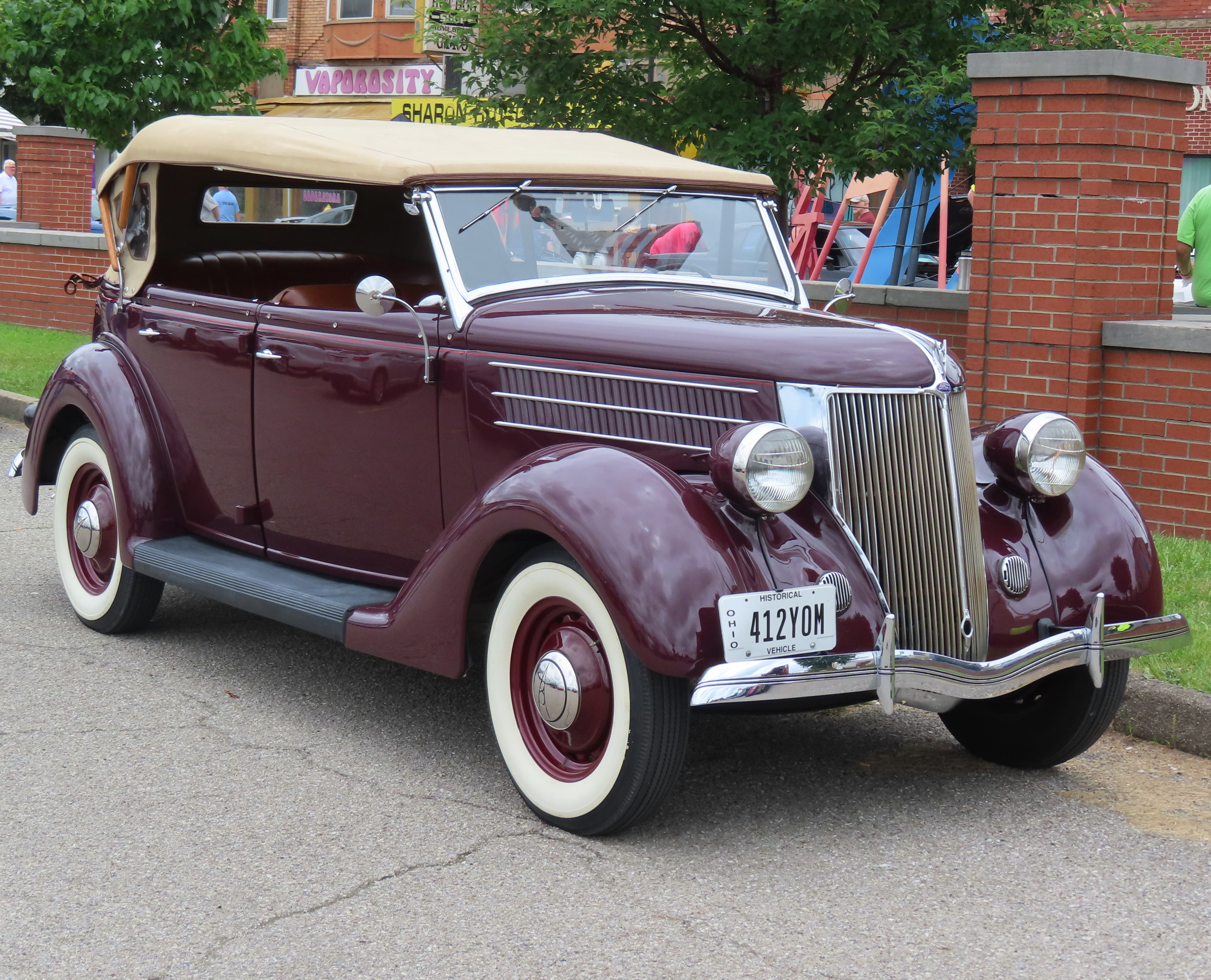
- 1936 Ford V-8 De Luxe Phaeton (Model 68)

Overview
- Manufacturer: Ford
- Also called: Ford Model 68; Ford V8
- Production: 1935–1936
- Assembly: Atlanta, Georgia; Chester, Pennsylvania; Chicago, Illinois; Long Beach, California; Dearborn, Michigan; Bucharest, Romania

Body and chassis
- Class: Full-size Ford
- Body style: 2-door roadster 2-door coupe 4-door sedan 4-door convertible 4-door station wagon 2-door pickup 3-door van
- Layout: FR layout

Powertrain
- Engine: 221 cu in (3.6 L) Flathead V8
- Transmission: 3-speed sliding-mesh manual

Dimensions
- Wheelbase: 112 in (2,845 mm)
- Length: 4,642 mm (182.8 in) (3-Window Coupé)
- Width: 1,765 mm (69.5 in) (3-Window Coupé)
- Height: 1,642 mm (64.6 in) (3-Window Coupé)

Chronology
- Predecessor: Ford Model 18; Ford Model 40A
- Successor: 1937 Ford

The Ford Model 48 is a car produced by Ford Motor Company. It was an update on Ford's V8-powered Model 40A, the company's main product. Introduced in 1935, the Model 48 was given a cosmetic refresh annually, begetting the 1937 Ford before being thoroughly redesigned for 1941. The 1935 Ford's combination of price, practicality, and looks vaulted the company ahead of rival Chevrolet for the sales crown that year, with 820,000 sold.

== Technical description ==
The Ford Model 48 has a front-mounted engine, and rear-wheel drive. It features a traditional body-on-frame design, and was offered with ten different body styles, made by various different coachbuilders.

Ford used a simple, and cheap U-profile ladder frame made from pressed steel. In front, the Model 48 has a stub-type beam axle with a single transverse leaf spring, and a single, triangular-shaped combined longitudinal and transverse control arm. The rear axle is a live beam axle that also has a single, transverse leaf spring, combined with a triangular-shaped combined longitudinal and transverse control arm. The wheelbase is 112 in (2,845 mm). On all four wheels, the Ford Model 48 has mechanically operated 12.0 in (305 mm) drum brakes, and 6.00 by 16 inch tyres. The steering system is a conventional worm-and-sector steering system. The rolling chassis has conventional grease nipples, and a total mass of 2,010 lb (910 kg).

The engine is Ford's 3.062-by-3.75-inch (77.8 by 95.3 mm), 221 in^{3} (3,620 cm^{3}; 3.62 L) 90° flathead V8 Otto (spark ignition) engine. It is liquid-cooled, and consists of five main cast pieces made of a light metal alloy: the engine block with cast-in cylinders, the intake plenum, two flatheads, and a fairly expensive oilpan. Both the crankshaft and the camshaft have three bearings each; every two conrods share a single bearing. The main oil line is a steel tube installed above the centrally located, plastic gear-driven camshaft. The camshaft bearings have annular grooves which allow the oil to pass down to the crankshaft below. The ignition distributor is driven by the camshaft and has a centrifugal force actuated, automatic ignition retard/advance system. Ford chose to install two water pumps in the engine that are driven by a belt. The same belt also powers the generator and the generator-mounted cooling fan. For mixture formation, the engine has a single Solex 30 LFFK two-barrel downdraft carburetor that is fed by an intake plenum mounted, mechanically driven fuel pump. Kremser (1942) writes that the engine has a compression of ε=6.15, and a rated power of 85 hp (63 kW) at 3800/min (with the max power being 90 hp (67 kW)), whereas according to Oswald (1979) the compression is ε=6.3, and the rated power 90 PS (89 hp; 66 kW) at 3800/min. Oswald also gives a torque figure (21 kp⋅m (152 lb⋅ft; 206 N⋅m) at 2250/min), which Kremser omits.

From the engine, the torque is sent through a dry single-disk clutch to a three-speed sliding-mesh transmission that is, due to its design, not synchronized. The car's final drive is 4.11; a 3.78 final drive was available as a factory option, which allows a top speed of 135 km/h (84 mph).

== Years ==
=== 1935 ===
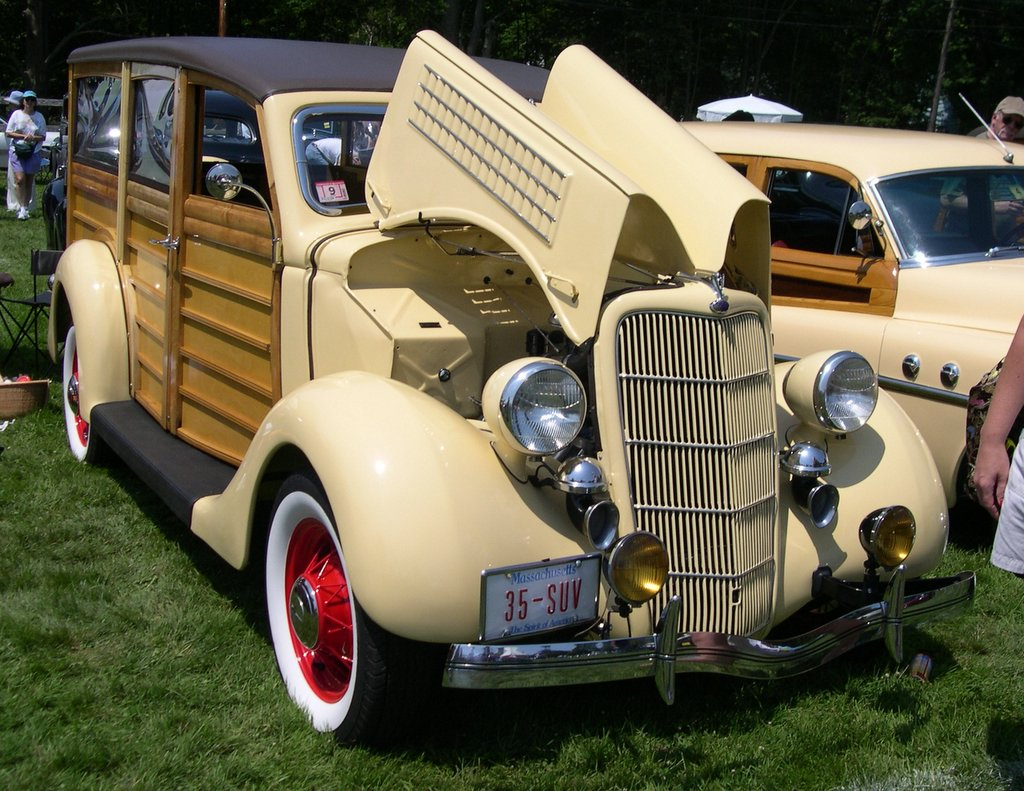
1935 Model V8 Woody Wagon

The 1935 Ford was a thorough refresh on the popular V8-powered Ford. The four-cylinder Model A engine was no longer offered, leaving just the 221 cu in (3.62 L) V8 to power every Ford car and truck. The transverse leaf spring suspension remained, but the front spring was relocated ahead of the axle to allow more interior volume. The body was lowered and new "Center-Poise" seating improved comfort.

Visually, the 1935 Ford was much more modern with the grille pushed forward and made more prominent by de-emphasized and more-integrated fenders, reflecting modern Art Deco influences. A major advance was a true integrated trunk on "trunkback" sedans, though the traditional "flatback" was also offered. Outdated body styles like the Victoria were also deleted for the year. The wooden panels were manufactured at the Ford Iron Mountain Plant in the Michigan Upper Peninsula from Ford owned lumber.

Two trim lines were offered, standard and DeLuxe, across a number of body styles including a base roadster, five-window coupe, three-window coupe, Tudor and Fordor sedans in flatback or trunkback versions, a convertible sedan, a woody station wagon, and new Model 51 truck. Rumble seats were optional on coupe model. An oil pressure gauge (costing $4) and two windshield wipers were optional. If one got the optional radio, it replaced the ash tray.

=== 1936 ===
Chevrolet regained the sales lead at the end of 1936, but the Ford still sold well. A new club cabriolet model was introduced with a fully framed windshield and weatherproof top, and the convertible sedan gained the popular integrated trunkback design.

The look was updated with an inverted pentagonal grille with all-vertical bars beneath a prominent hood and three horizontal chrome side strips (on DeLuxe models). The V8 DeLuxe was called Model 68. A concealed horn, long a prominent part of the Ford's design, also brought the car into modern times. The new trucks continued with the old grille. Other major changes for 1936 were the use of pressed steel "artillery" solid wheels instead of wire wheels.

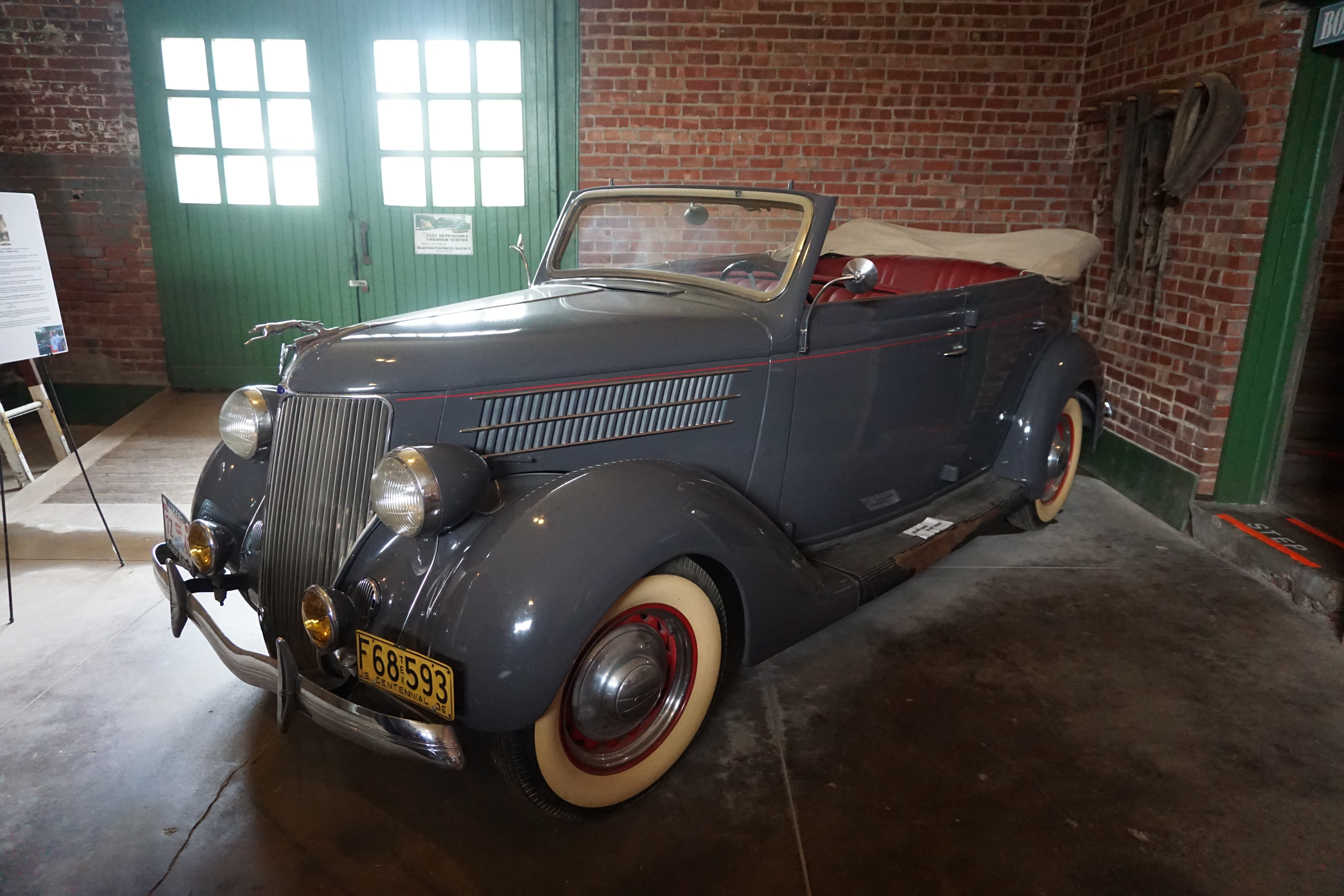
1936 Model 48 convertible

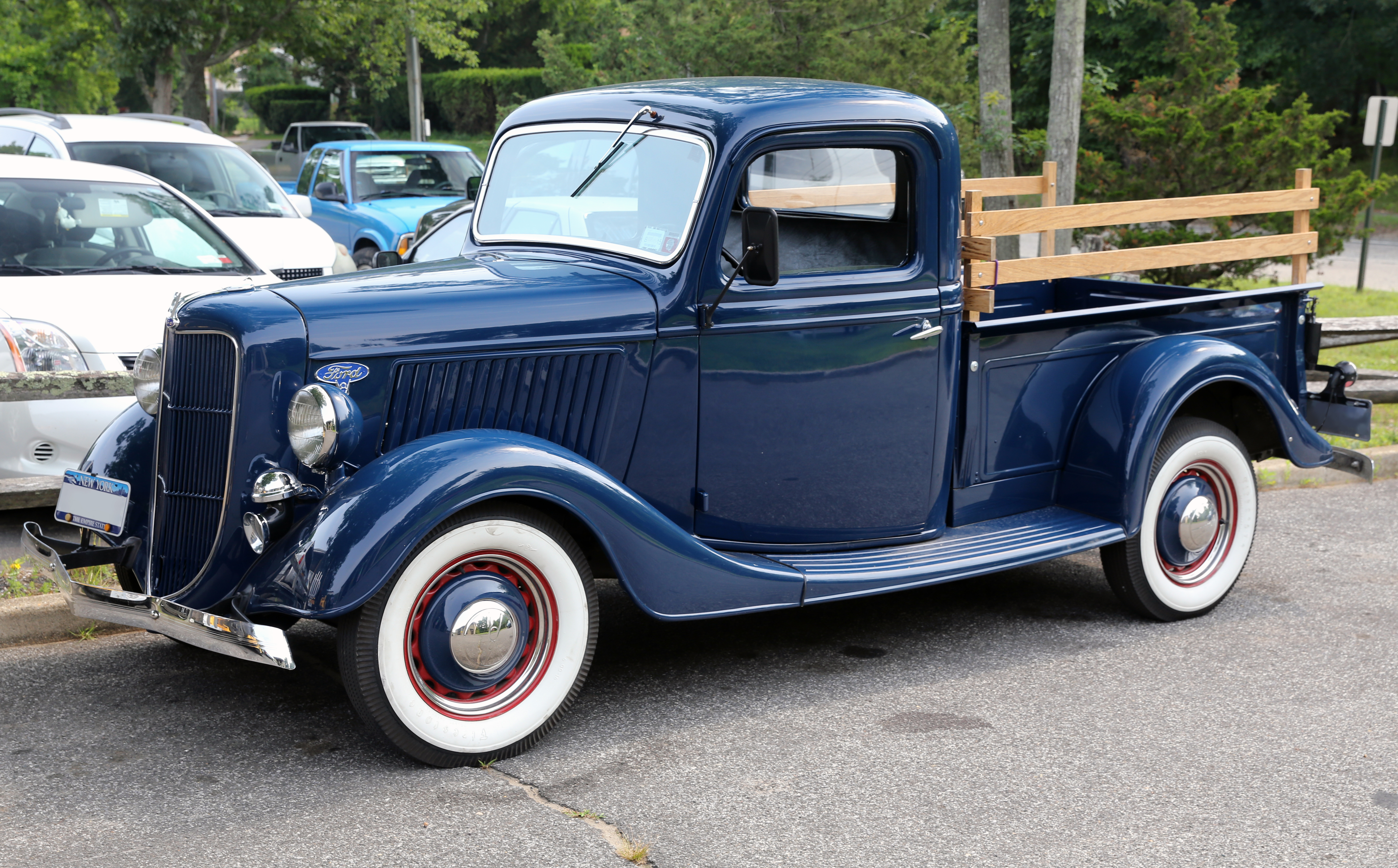
1936 Model 67 pickup truck

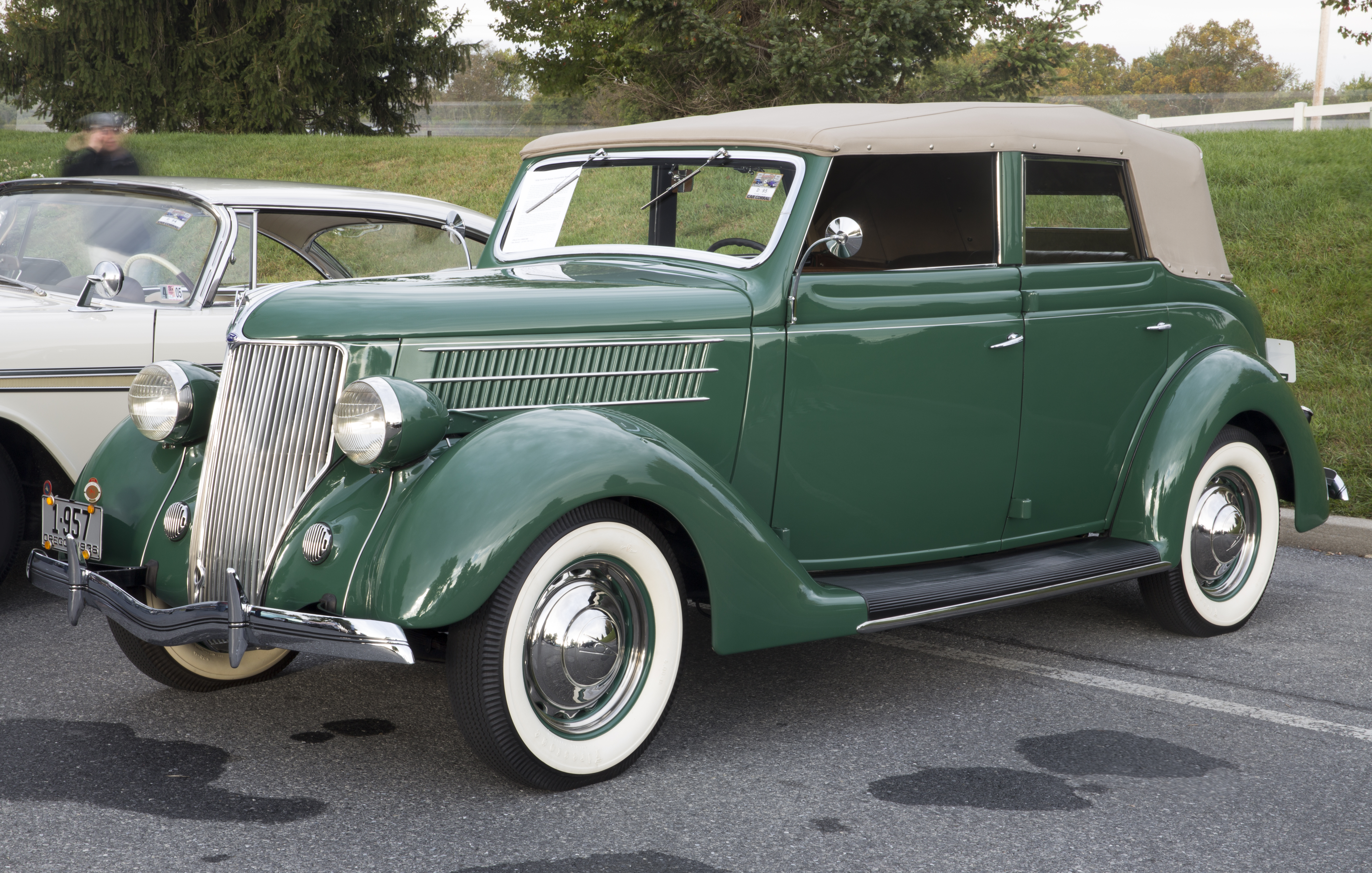
1936 DeLuxe Convertible Sedan (Model 68)

Six models were made with stainless steel bodies in a collaboration between Ford and the Allegheny Ludlum Steel Corporation to promote use of the metal.

=== 1937 ===
In 1938, Ford brought out new styling for its cars. Initially, only a V8 was offered, producing either 60 hp (45 kW) or 85 hp (63 kW) like 1935 Fords.

== Sources ==
- David L. Lewis (2005). 100 Years of Ford. Publications International. pp. 81–89. ISBN 0-7853-7988-6.
- "Generations: Ford Model T to Crown Victoria". Edmunds.com.
- Oswald, Werner [in German] (1979), Deutsche Autos 1920-1945 – Alle deutschen Personenwagen der damaligen Zeit (in German) (3rd ed.), Stuttgart: Motorbuch-Verlag, ISBN 978-3-87943-519-7
- Kremser, Hans (1942), Hans List (ed.), Der Aufbau schnellaufender Verbrennungskraftmaschinen für Kraftfahrzeuge und Triebwagen, Die Verbrennungskraftmaschine (in German), vol. 11, Wien: Springer, pp. 214–216, ISBN 978-3-7091-9755-4
