= BlueOval City =

Formerly planned automotive assembly plant in Tennessee, United States

- Operated: Planned to begin in 2025
- Location: Haywood County near Stanton, Tennessee, United States
- Coordinates: 35.41°N 89.42°W
- Employees: 5,800 (planned, not realized)
- Area: 4,100 acres (1,700 ha)
- Owners: Ford Motor Company; SK Innovation

BlueOval City is a cancelled project that was planned to have been an automotive assembly complex near Stanton, Tennessee operated by Ford Motor Company and SK Innovation. It was originally intended to be operational in 2025. The facility took its name from Ford's logo. The plant was intended to manufacture a next-generation electric pickup truck and associated batteries, Ford now plans instead to build just gas-powered pickup trucks in the renamed plant. The auto manufacturer plans to begin producing gas-powered truck models at its renamed Tennessee Truck Plant in 2029.

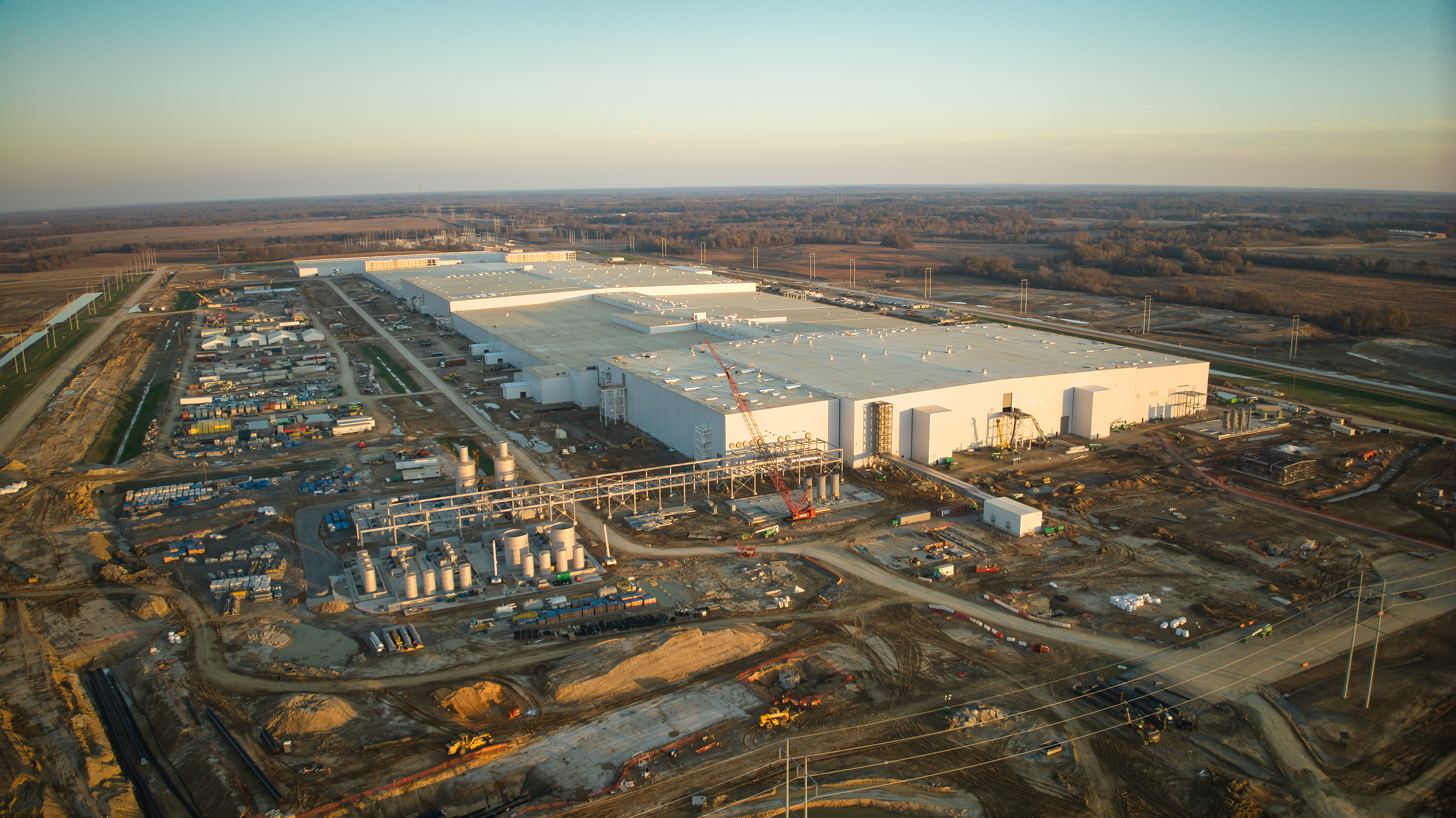
Aerial Photo of BlueOval City

The project was expected to cost $5.6 billion, making it the most expensive single investment in Tennessee history. It was to have employed approximately 5,800 people when completed.

== History ==
The project was jointly announced by both companies on September 27, 2021. A ceremony was held the following day at Shelby Farms in Memphis, providing further details of the project. The facilities were to have been constructed at the 4,100-acre (1,700 ha) Memphis Regional Megasite, also known as the West Tennessee Megasite, which was designated as an industrial site in September 2009. The site is accessible from Interstate 40.

The state was initially expected to provide approximately $500 million worth of incentives, including infrastructure improvements, grants, and a new campus operated by the Tennessee College of Applied Technology (TCAT) to train workers for the plants. The final cost eventually ballooned to $884 million.

In addition to BlueOval City, Ford and SK Innovation announced plans to construct twin battery plants in Glendale, Kentucky, called BlueOval SK Battery Park.

== See also ==
- List of Ford factories
