= Ford Motor Company Cincinnati Plant =

- U.S. National Register of Historic Places
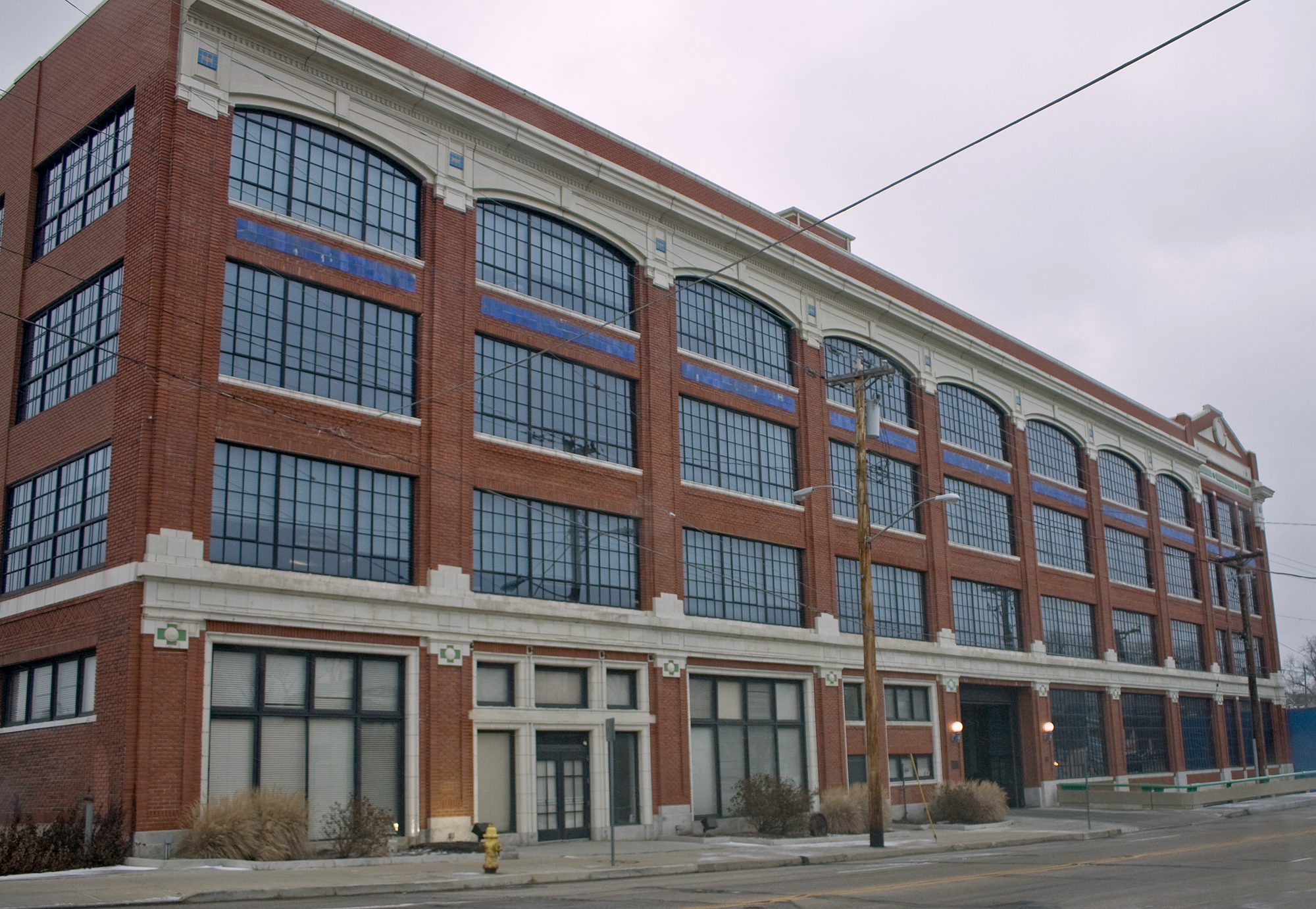
- Location: Cincinnati, Ohio
- Coordinates: 39°7′57.68″N 84°29′37.01″W
- Architect: Albert Kahn
- Architectural style: Chicago
- NRHP reference No.: 89000460
- Added to NRHP: May 25, 1989

Ford Motor Company Cincinnati Plant is a registered historic building in Cincinnati, Ohio, listed in the National Register on May 25, 1989.

The former manufacturing plant was transformed in 2002 into office space. As of 2017, the building is owned by Cincinnati Children's.

== See also ==
- Ford Motor Company
