= Ford Motor Company Philippines =

Filipino subsidiary company

Ford Group Philippines, Inc.
- Type: Subsidiary
- Industry: Automotive
- Founded: 1997; 29 years ago
- Headquarters: 8th Floor, Filinvest One Building, Northgate Cyberzone, Filinvest City, Alabang, Muntinlupa, Philippines
- Area served: Philippines
- Key people: Michael Breen (Managing Director)
- Products: Automobiles, Pickup Trucks, SUVs
- Owner: Ford Motor Company
- Number of employees: 5,000 (2013)
- Parent: Ford Group Philippines
- Website: ford.com.ph

Ford Group Philippines, Inc. (FGPI) is a Philippine-based subsidiary of Ford Motor Company. It was primarily focused on manufacturing automobiles for local and regional markets from 1998 until 2012. It built the Ford Escape, Ford Laser/Lynx, Ford Focus, Mazda3, and Mazda Tribute for the Philippines, Thailand, Indonesia, Singapore, Malaysia and Vietnam. Since 2012, Ford Philippines imports the vehicles it sells to the Philippine market. These imports come mostly from Thailand and the United States.

== History ==
Ford's history in the Philippines can be traced back to 1913 with the local assembly of the Ford Model T. In 1929, Henry Ford established "Pilipinas Ford Car Works, Inc." (PFCW). In 1967, "Ford Philippines, Inc." (FPI) was established as a subsidiary of the Ford Motor Company and began production operations on May 3, 1968, located at Sucat, Parañaque. In 1976, FPI inaugurated a body stamping plant in Mariveles, Bataan. On March 20, 1984, FPI formally and unexpectedly announced it would cease its operations in the Philippines by August 1984, in accordance with a decision reached by the management of Ford Motor Company.

In 1997, Ford returned to the Philippines with the establishment of "Ford Motor Company Philippines, Inc." (FMCPI), introducing US-made vehicles such as the Expedition, the F-150, the Clubwagon and the Lincoln Town Car. A new P4 Billion state-of-the-art assembly plant in Santa Rosa, Laguna opened in September 1999. The first car manufactured at the plant was the Ford Lynx, and the company began building the Mazda-based Ford Ranger in March 2000. FMPCI company expanded its line-up with the introduction of the Escape SUV, Explorer SUV and Everest SUV. The Fiesta joined the local Ford line up in August 2010, this was followed by the Mustang in July 2012.

In 2012, Ford announced the consolidation of manufacturing operations in Southeast Asia and the cessation of operations at the Santa Rosa plant, citing "lack of supply base and economies of scale." 250 workers were affected by the decision, which Ford Philippines tried to resolve by offering them work at other Ford manufacturing facilities overseas. Despite this closure, Ford Philippines is opening more dealerships and expanding its vehicle lineup by the year 2015. In March 2014, Mitsubishi Motors Philippines Corporation announced it had acquired the former Ford assembly plant.

In early 2014, the subcompact EcoSport SUV was added to the local Ford lineup. In November 2019, Ford introduced the rear-wheel drive diesel Transit full-size van. In June 2020, the full-size F150 returned to the Philippines after a long hiatus.

== Current models ==
- Ford Bronco (2024–present) – Imported from United States
- Ford Everest (2003–present) – Imported from Thailand
- Ford Explorer (2004–present) – Imported from United States
- Ford Mustang (2012–present) – Imported from United States
- Ford Mustang Mach-E (2025–present) – Imported from Mexico
- Ford Ranger (2000–present) – Manufactured locally until 2006 then imported from Thailand
  - Ford Ranger Raptor (2018–present) – Imported from Thailand
- Ford Territory (2020–present) – Imported from China

== Former models ==
The list only includes vehicles that were sold after the brand's return in the Philippines in 1997.

- Ford E-150 (1997–2014) – Imported from United States
- Ford EcoSport (2014–2022) – Imported from Thailand from 2014 to 2018 then imported from China from 2018 and 2022
- Ford Escape (2001–2012, 2015–2016) – Manufactured locally from 2001 to 2012 then imported from United States from 2015 to 2016
- Ford Expedition (1997–2022) – Imported from United States
- Ford Explorer Sport Trac (2001–2004) – Imported from United States
- Ford F-150 (1997–1999, 2020–2023) – Imported from United States
- Ford Fiesta (2010–2019) – Imported from Thailand
- Ford Focus (1999–2018) – Manufactured locally from 1999 to 2012 then imported from Thailand from 2012 to 2018
- Ford Lynx (1999–2005) – Manufactured locally
- Ford Transit (2019–2022) – Imported from Turkey
- Lincoln Town Car (1997–2000) – Imported from United States
