= Willowvale Motor Industries =

Willowvale Motor Industries (Pvt.) Ltd.
- Company type: Proprietary company
- Industry: Automotive
- Founded: 1967; 59 years ago
- Headquarters: Harare, Zimbabwe
- Area served: Zimbabwe

The Willowvale Motor Industries (Pvt.) Ltd. (from 1989 to 2015 Willowvale Mazda Motor Industries (Pvt.) Ltd.) is an automobile and commercial vehicle manufacturer in Zimbabwe.

== History ==
After the unilateral declaration of independence by Rhodesia, it was no longer possible to import complete vehicles to Rhodesia due to UN sanctions. In addition, the two domestic assembly plants of BMC and Ford lost access to their export markets, so that production stagnated and both plants had to close in early 1967.

Both assembly plants were bought up by the Rhodesian Industrial Development Corporation. Companies whose vehicles were assembled by WMI included Toyota, BMW, Peugeot, Citroën, Nissan (Datsun), Scania, Renault, Bedford and Alfa Romeo. The assembled BMW models were the BMW 2000 GL based on the Glas 1700, which was sold locally as the Cheetah.

Other brands produced were Daihatsu and Isuzu. Mazda models were added in July 1980. The Toyota Land Cruiser was manufactured from 1981 to 1993.

Tractors from Ford, Deutz, Universal (Romania), Fiat, John Deere and Massey Ferguson were also manufactured.

In 1986, the government of Zimbabwe announced a new initiative for automobile production. At the same time, production had to be severely restricted due to the lack of foreign exchange. In 1989, Mazda was selected as a technical partner. The shareholders of the company, which was renamed Willowvale Mazda Motor Industries, are the state-owned Motec Holdings (58%), Mazda Motor (25%), Itochu (8%) and an employee benefit fund (9%). In the 1990s WMMI had around 2000 employees (1997) and produced up to 9000 units a year.

From 2000 onwards, production fell sharply. Production had to be interrupted for several months in each of 2000 and 2010. In 2012 WMMI stopped production. The reason given was that at least 4000 units would have to be produced per year. This value had already been significantly undercut before. The last models produced were the Mazda 3 and the Mazda BT-50.

In November 2015, it was announced that the company would be renamed Willowvale Motor Industries without changing its ownership structure or business model. In early 2017, production was resumed in cooperation with BAIC and Astol Motors as part of the newly founded joint venture Beiqi Zimbabwe. Double cabin pick-ups are produced, which are sold as BAIC Great Tiger or ZX Grand Tiger.
