= 1937 Ford =

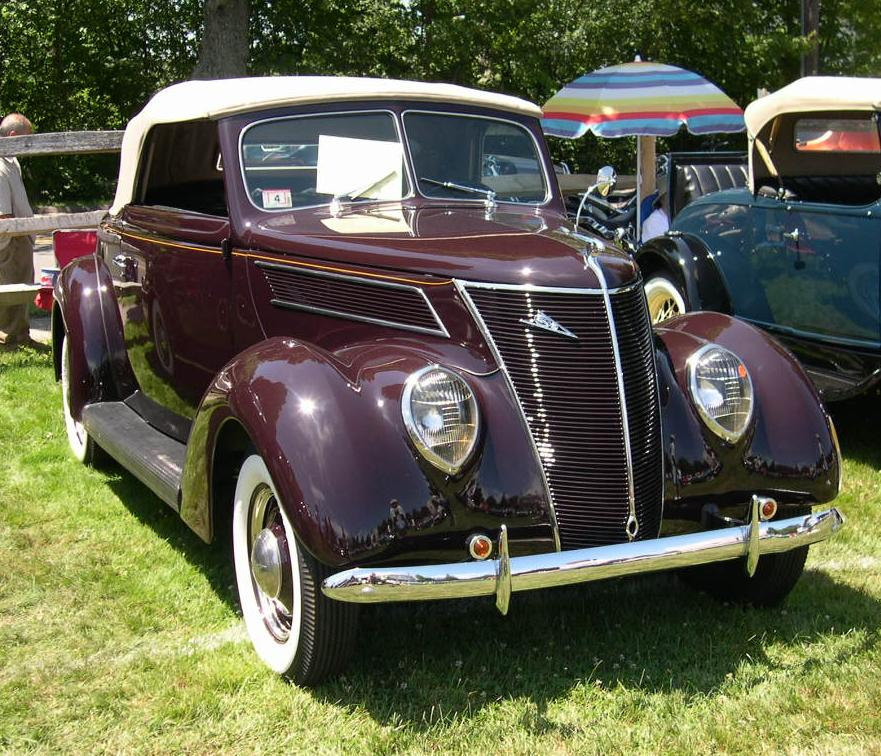
- 1937 Ford convertible

Overview
- Manufacturer: Ford
- Production: 1937–1940
- Assembly: Atlanta, Georgia; Chester, Pennsylvania; Chicago, Illinois; Long Beach, California; Dearborn, Michigan; Riga, Latvia; Bucharest, Romania

Body and chassis
- Class: Full-size Ford
- Body style: 2-door coupe 2-door convertible 2-door 1-ton pickup truck 2-door sedan 2-door station wagon 2-door van 4-door sedan 4-door station wagon 2-door coupe utility (Australia); 2-door roadster utility (Australia)
- Layout: FR layout

Powertrain
- Engine: 136 CID (2.2 L) Flathead V8; 221 CID (3.6 L) Flathead V8
- Transmission: 3-speed sliding-mesh manual

Dimensions
- Wheelbase: 2,845 mm (112.0 in)

Chronology
- Predecessor: Ford Model 48
- Successor: 1941 Ford

The Ford line of cars was updated in 1937 with one major change — the introduction of an entry-level 136 cu in (2.23 L) V8 in addition to the popular 221 cu in (3.62 L) flathead V8. The model was a refresh of its predecessor, the Model 48 (itself based on the Model 40A) and was the company's main product. It was redesigned more thoroughly in 1941. At the start of production, it cost US$850 ($19,036 in 2025 dollars). The Ford Line bore several model numbers during this period, each related to their respective HP numbers. In 1937, 85 HP cars were known as Model 78 while 60 HP cars were known as Model 74. This changed to Model 81A and 82A respectively in 1938, and Models 91A and 922A in 1939.

== 1937 ==
The 1937 Ford featured a more rounded streamline look with fine horizontal bars in the convex front and hood-side grilles. The front grille was V-shaped, rather than following the fenders into a pentagon shape, as on the 1936 model. Faired-in headlights installed in the front fenders were a major modernization found on both the Standard and DeLuxe trim versions, as well as the introduction of a single piece lifting hood panel, and an all steel top for the passenger compartment. The Standard could be distinguished from the DeLuxe by the body color radiator grilles and windshield frames while the DeLuxe had walnut woodgrain window mouldings, chrome exterior trim brightwork, and a woodgrain finish applied to the interior window trim. A larger water pump was used to help aid in cooling. 'Slantback' sedans gained a rear trunk door, though trunk space was limited with the spare tire, and 'Trunkback' versions continued gaining in sales. The Woodie station wagon had seating for eight passengers. A 4-door "convertible sedan" with roll up windows was offered in small numbers in the DeLuxe series. Also, new seats were used.

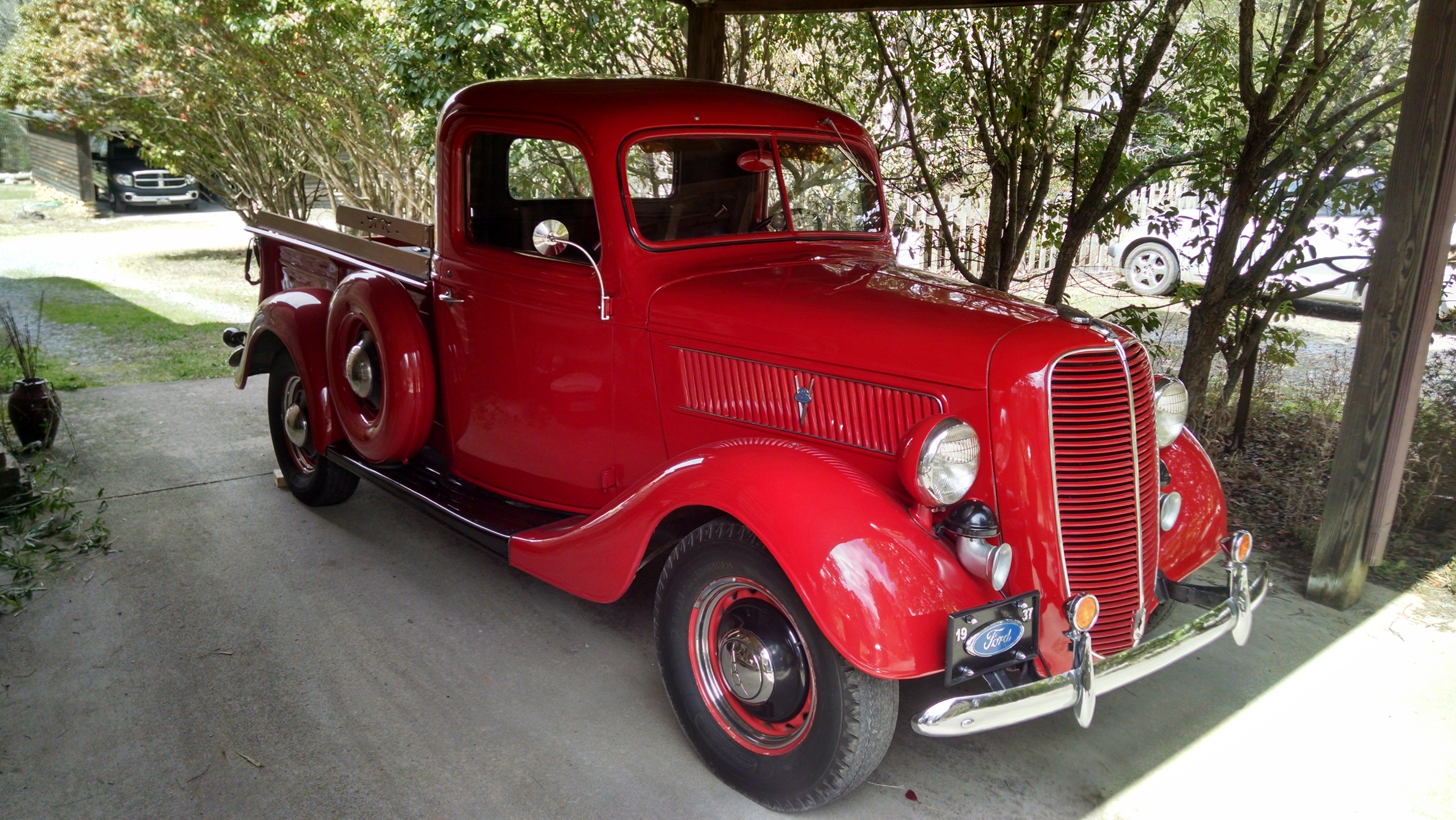
1937 Ford pickup with V8 engine

== 1938 ==
The 1938 recession hurt sales, as did Ford's continuing of the 1937 cars, including most body panels. 1938 DeLuxe models were differentiated with a heart-shaped grille, though standard models retained the 1937 look. The fading Slantback sedan design was cancelled for good. Only a V8 was offered, either a 60 hp (45 kW; 61 PS) V8 or an 85 hp (63 kW; 86 PS) V8. A new dash was used, with recessed controls for safety.

The 1938 trucks were finally updated, having continued with 1935 looks. Changes included a vertical oval grille and substantial fenders and bumpers.

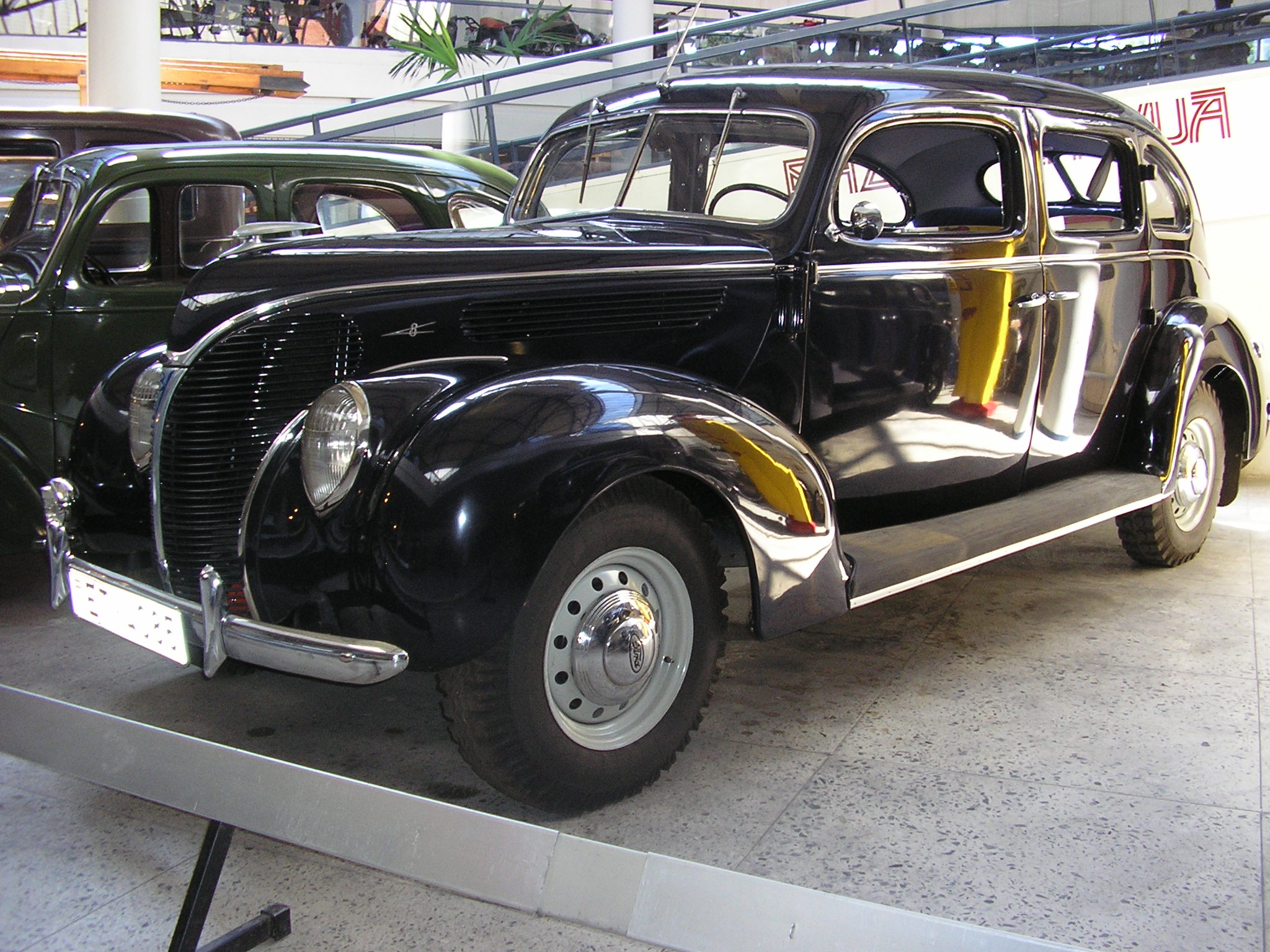
Latvian-assembled 1938 Ford Deluxe Fordor sedan

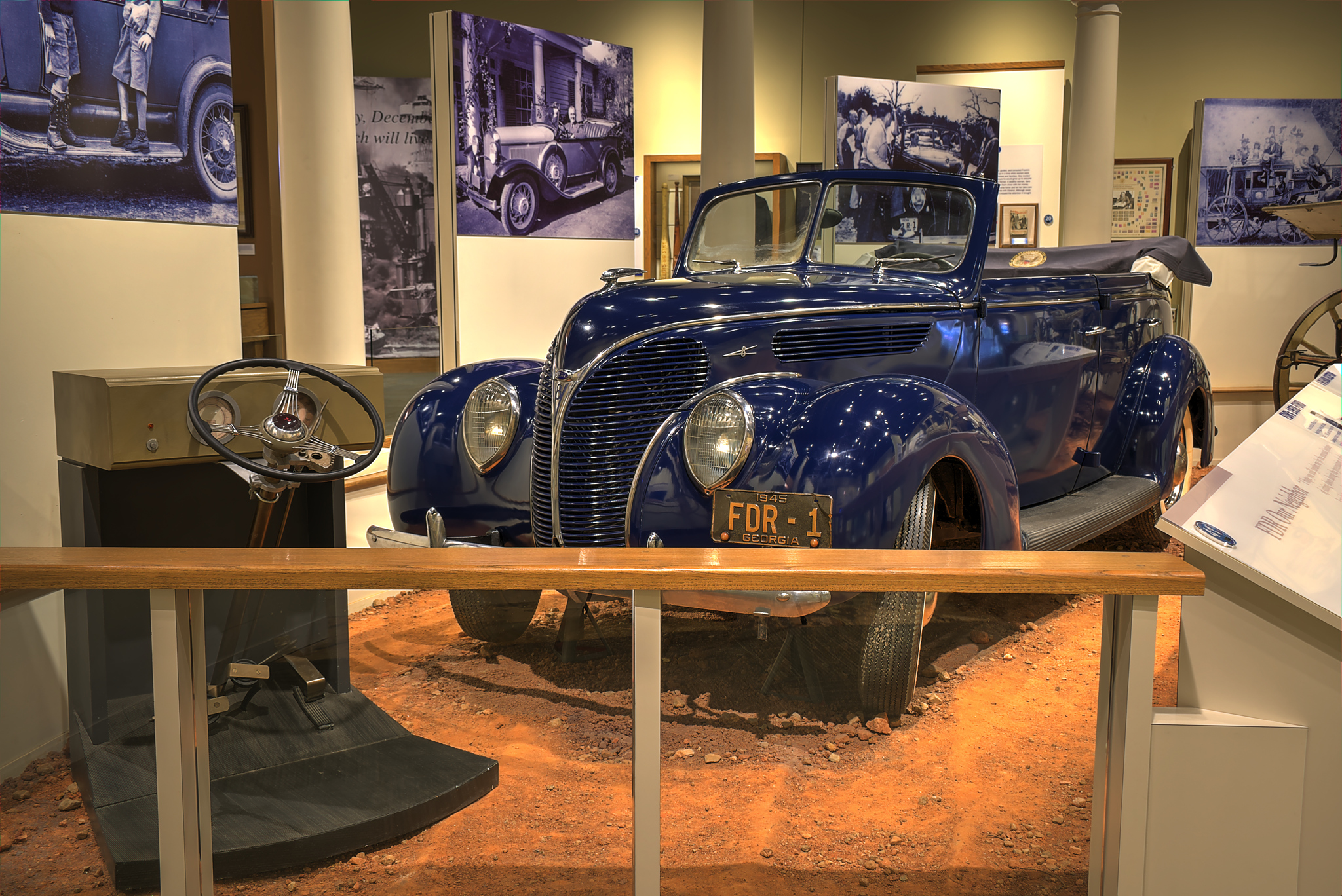
1938 Ford on display at the Little White House

== 1939 ==
The Ford's look was again modernized for 1939 — the Deluxe used a low pointed grille with heavier vertical slats, while the standard Ford had a higher grille with horizontal dividers. The headlights (the example illustrated has been converted to '40 Ford sealed beam headlamps - '39s used bulb and reflector lamps, the last year for them) were moved farther apart, sitting almost in front of the wheels. The side grilles and louvers were removed in favor of chrome strips on Deluxe models. The "alligator" hood opened deep from the top of the grille back, eliminating the side panels found on previous models.

Mechanically, Ford put hydraulic brakes on their cars for the first time.

The phaeton, club coupe, and convertible club coupe models were discontinued. The engine was also revised for 1939 with downdraft carburetors widening the torque band but leaving power unchanged at 85 hp (63 kW). Hydraulic brakes were a major advance across the Ford line.

Ford's upscale Mercury line also made its debut in 1939, filling the gap between the Deluxe Fords and the Lincoln-Zephyr line.

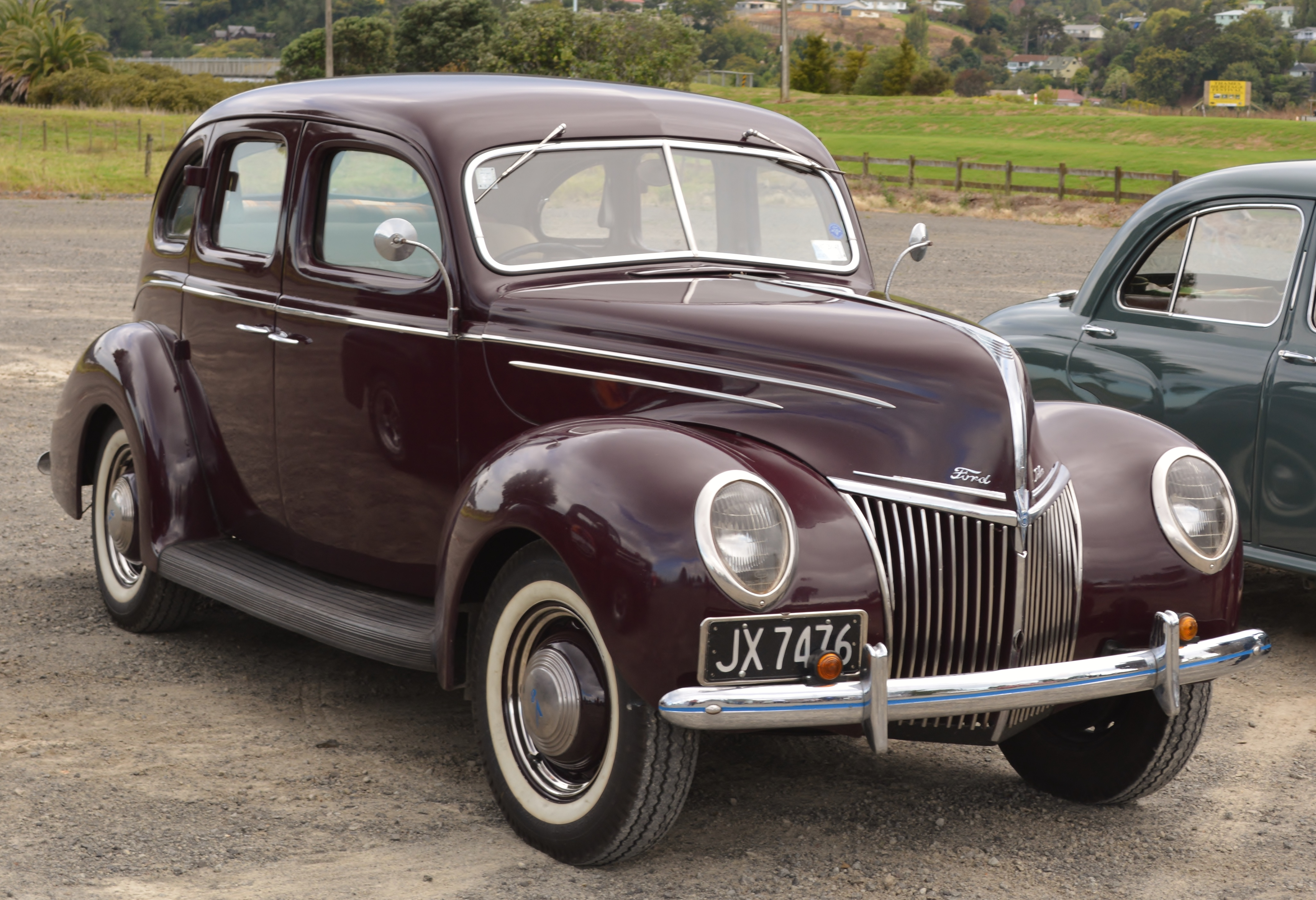
1939 Ford V8 De Luxe Fordor Sedan

== 1940 ==
A high flat-topped hood dominated the front look of the 1940 model, as the grille spread out to reach the fenders to differentiate the Deluxe line and the headlights were pushed wider still. The standard Ford inherited the grille of the 1939 model with blackout on each side of a heavy chrome center; heavier headlight surrounds serve as another major differentiator from the 1939. 1940 was the last year of the 1937 design and its smaller V8 engine, with a straight-six engine to be reintroduced the following year. Sealed-beam headlights were one of the few major advances for 1940, while a hydraulic top was new on the convertible.

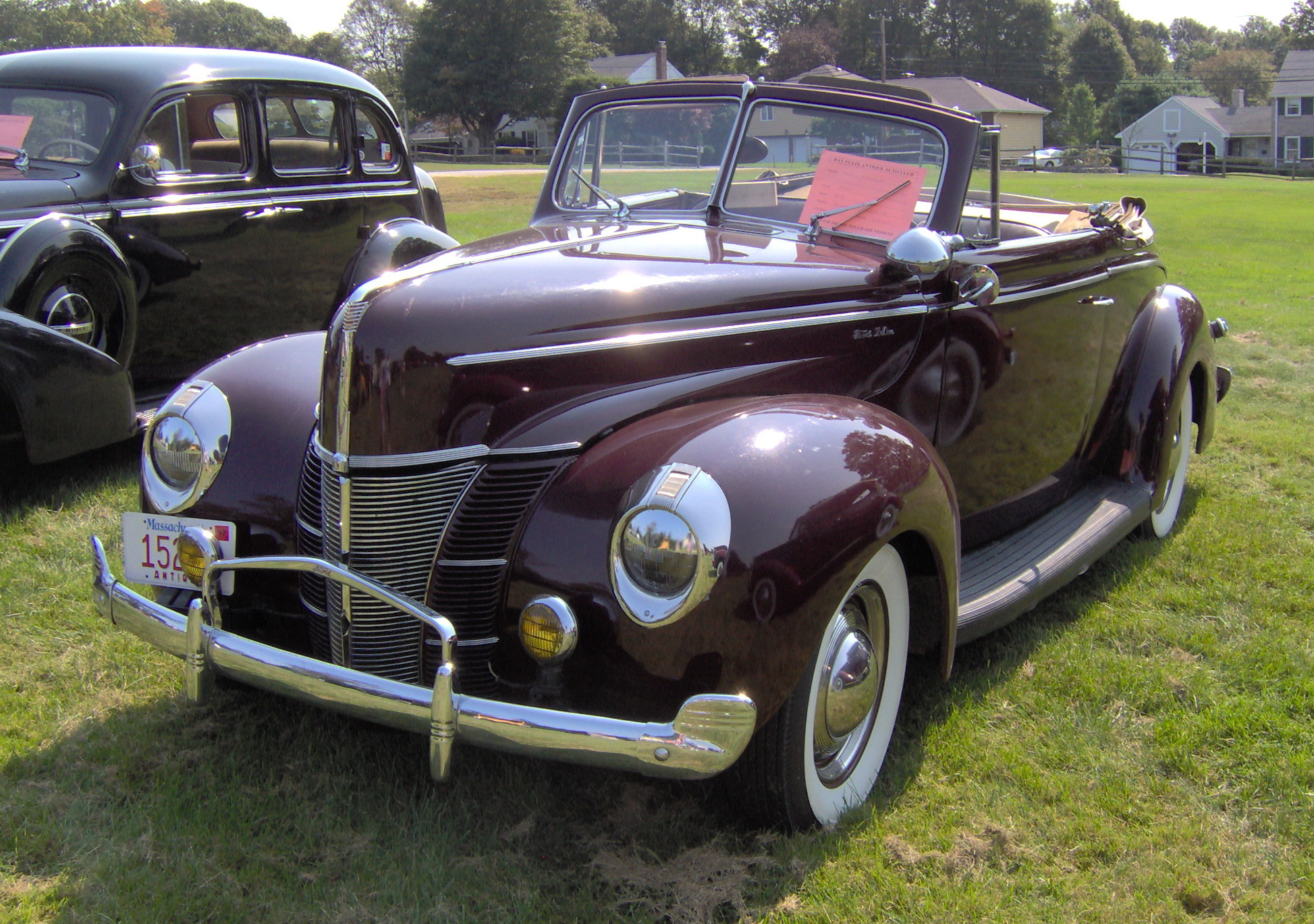
1940 Ford Deluxe Convertible Club Coupe

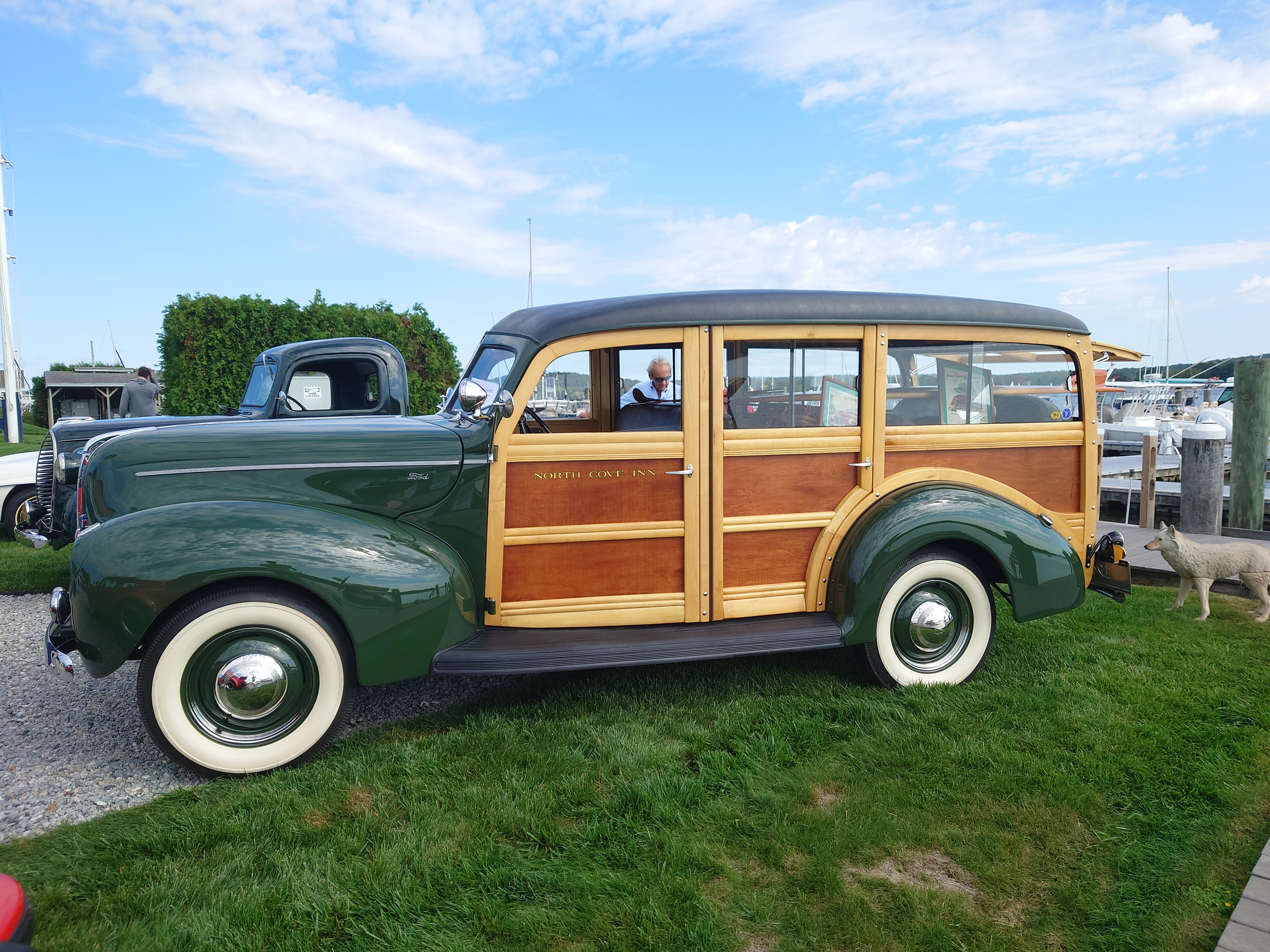
1940 Standard Station Wagon previously owned by North Cove Inn

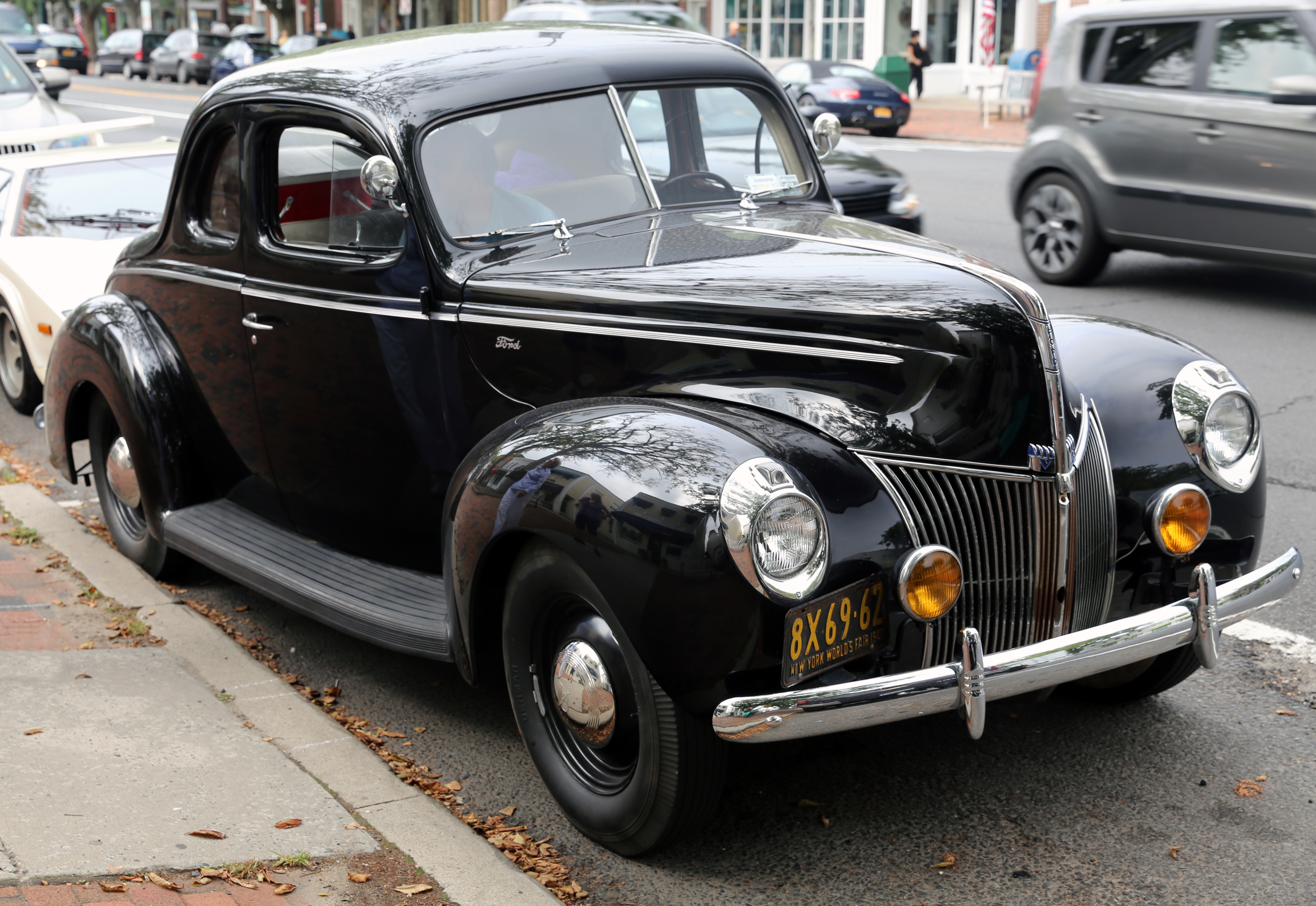
1940 Ford Standard Business Coupe

== Legacy ==
The 1937-1940 generation of Fords is one of the most popular automobiles for hot rodding. Early stock car racing drivers also used Fords of this generation among other cars. This Ford also formed the basis for a style of dirt track racing car.

== See also ==
- Ford Taunus G93A
- Ford Prefect

== Sources ==
- David L. Lewis (2005). 100 Years of Ford. Publications International. pp. 97–110. ISBN 0-7853-7988-6.
- "Generations: Ford Model T to Crown Victoria". Edmunds.com. Archived from the original on September 5, 2006.
