= Riga Motor Museum =

Museum in Riga, Latvia

Coordinates: 56.970550°N 24.227686°E

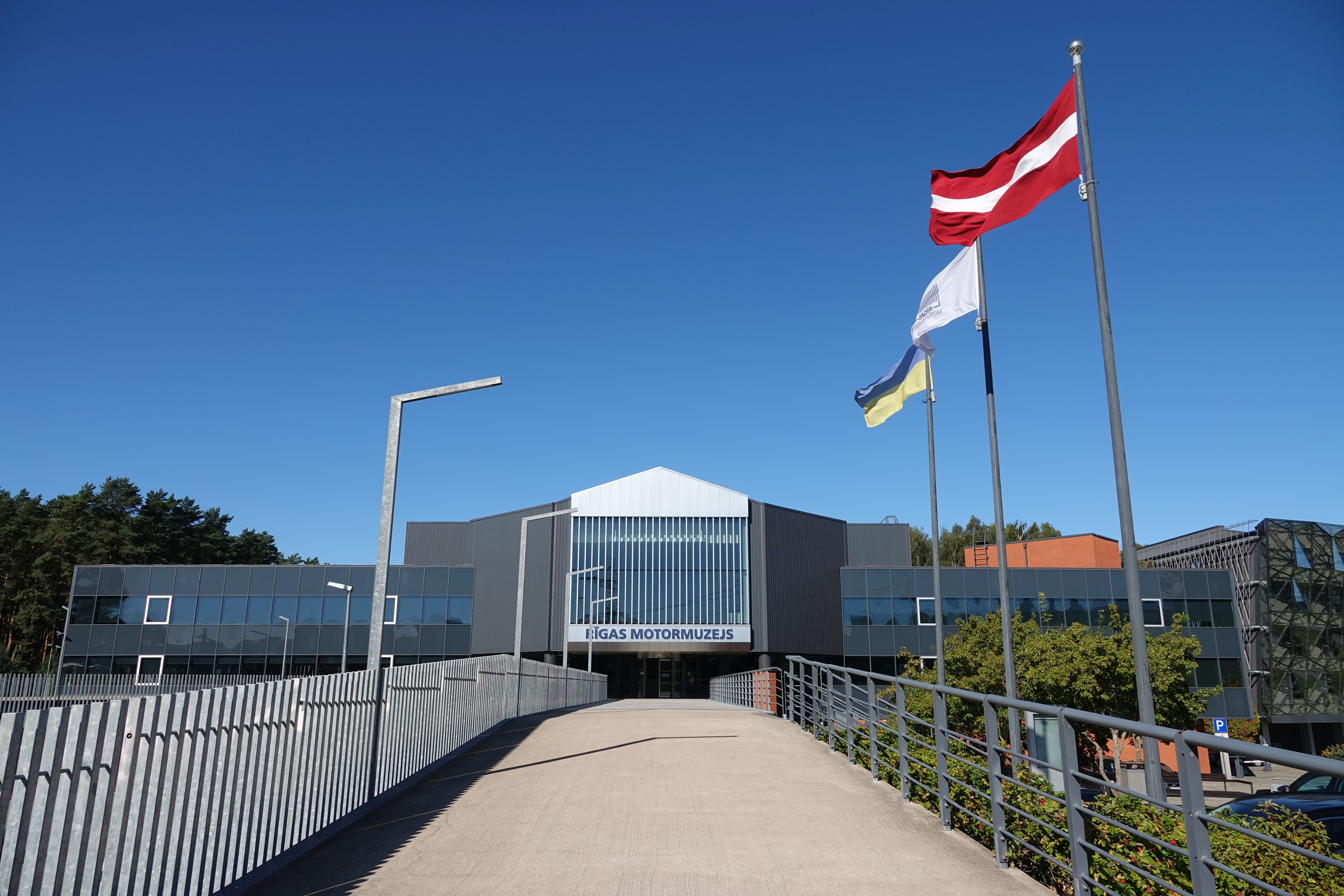
- Established: 1989; 37 years ago
- Location: Sergeja Eizenšteina iela 6, Riga, Latvia
- Type: Transportation museum
- Director: Aivars Aksenoks
- Website: Riga Motor Museum

Riga Motor Museum (Latvian: Rīgas motormuzejs) is the biggest antique vehicle museum in the Baltic countries, located in Riga, Latvia. The museum is a state agency operating under the Republic of Latvia Ministry of Transport. Since 1992, the museum is a member of International Association of Transport and Communication Museums (IATM–ICOM), since 1994 a member of Latvian Museum Association, since 2002 – a member of Latvian Transport Development and Education Association. The museum is located at 6 Sergeja Eizenšteina Street in the Mežciems neighbourhood of Riga. The museum also features a café and a sports club.

The museum was founded in 1989 on an initiative from Latvia Antique Automobile Club (AAK). The building was designed by the Latgyprogorstroy architect Viktors Valgums. Since 1992 it is a state museum.

In 2013, the museum closed for reconstruction works and all vehicles were moved to a temporary museum location in Rāmava. On 2 July 2016, the museum reopened.

== Exhibits ==
The museum consists of three floors, each with a different theme. The ground floor starts with the history of the automobile, before progressing through the history of cars in the early twentieth century and the manufacture of cars in Latvia. The first floor focuses on motorsports, cars of cultural significance and the soviet car industry, including a collection of soviet state cars that were used to transport soviet leaders safely and luxuriously. The basement contains a range of trucks and special purposes vehicles, including firetrucks, ambulances and other early special vehicles.

One of the most significant exhibits in the museum is a replica of the 1938 Auto Union racing car Type C/D. The original car was saved from cutting into scrap by Viktors Kulbergs, president of Antique Automobile Club of Latvia but then exchanged for a replica from Crostwaite & Gardiner and Roach Manufacturing after negotiations with Audi AG in 1995. The original 1938 car can now be admired in Audi's museum mobile in Ingolstadt.

== Gallery ==
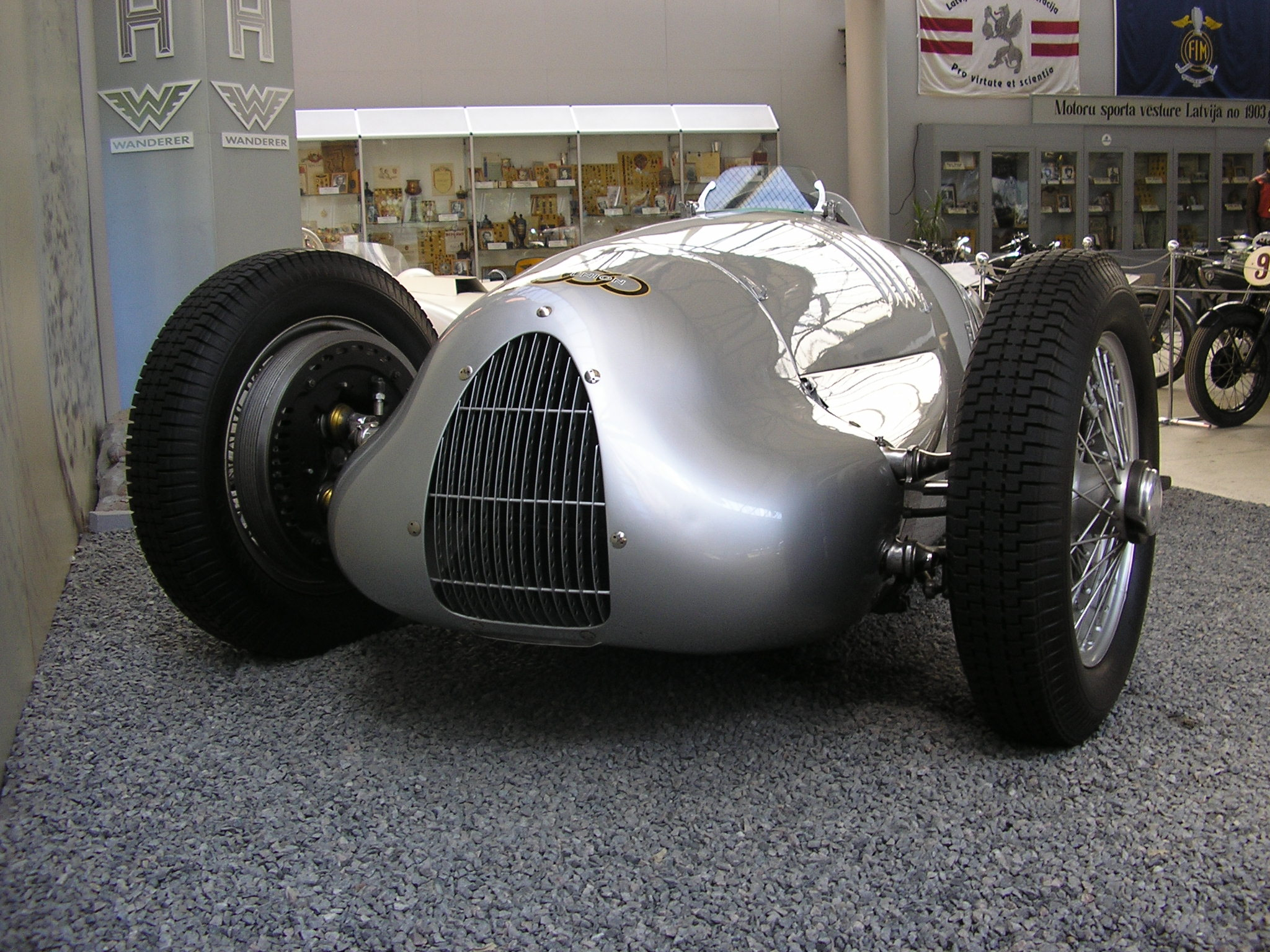
1938 Auto Union racing car Type C/D, replica

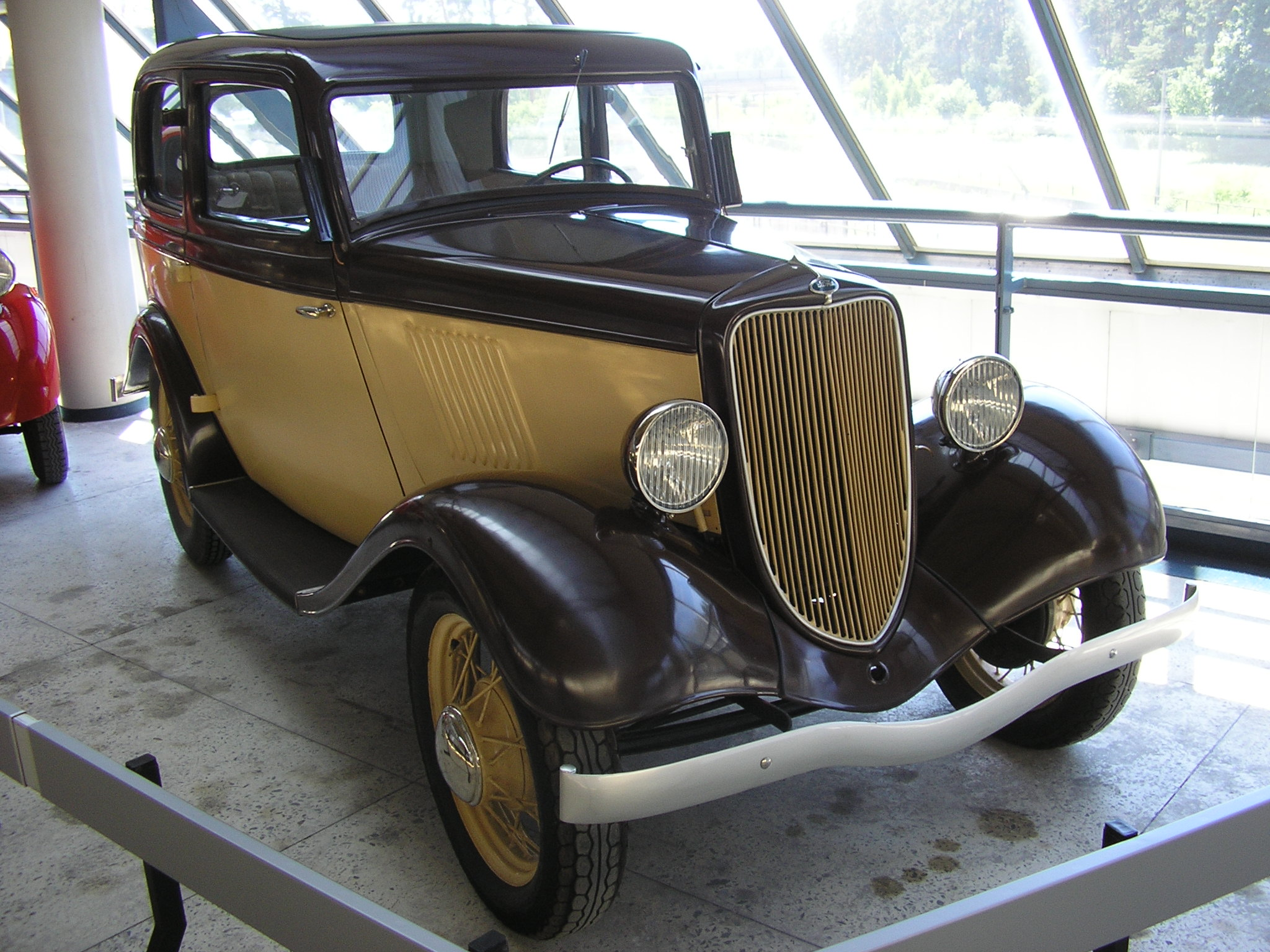
Ford Köln Y (1933) in Riga Motor museum

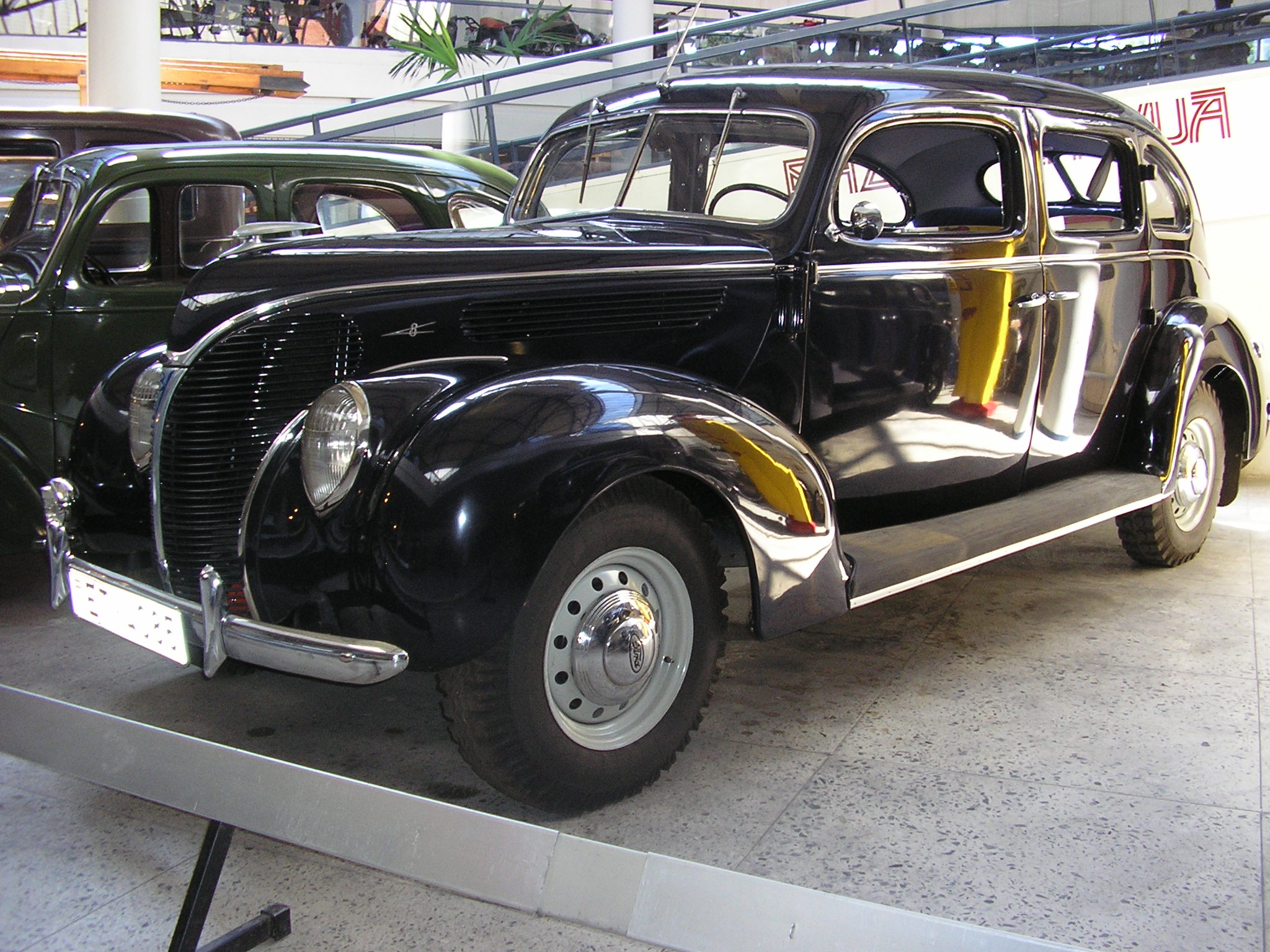
Latvian-built Ford-Vairogs V8 "De Luxe" (1938)in Riga Motor museum

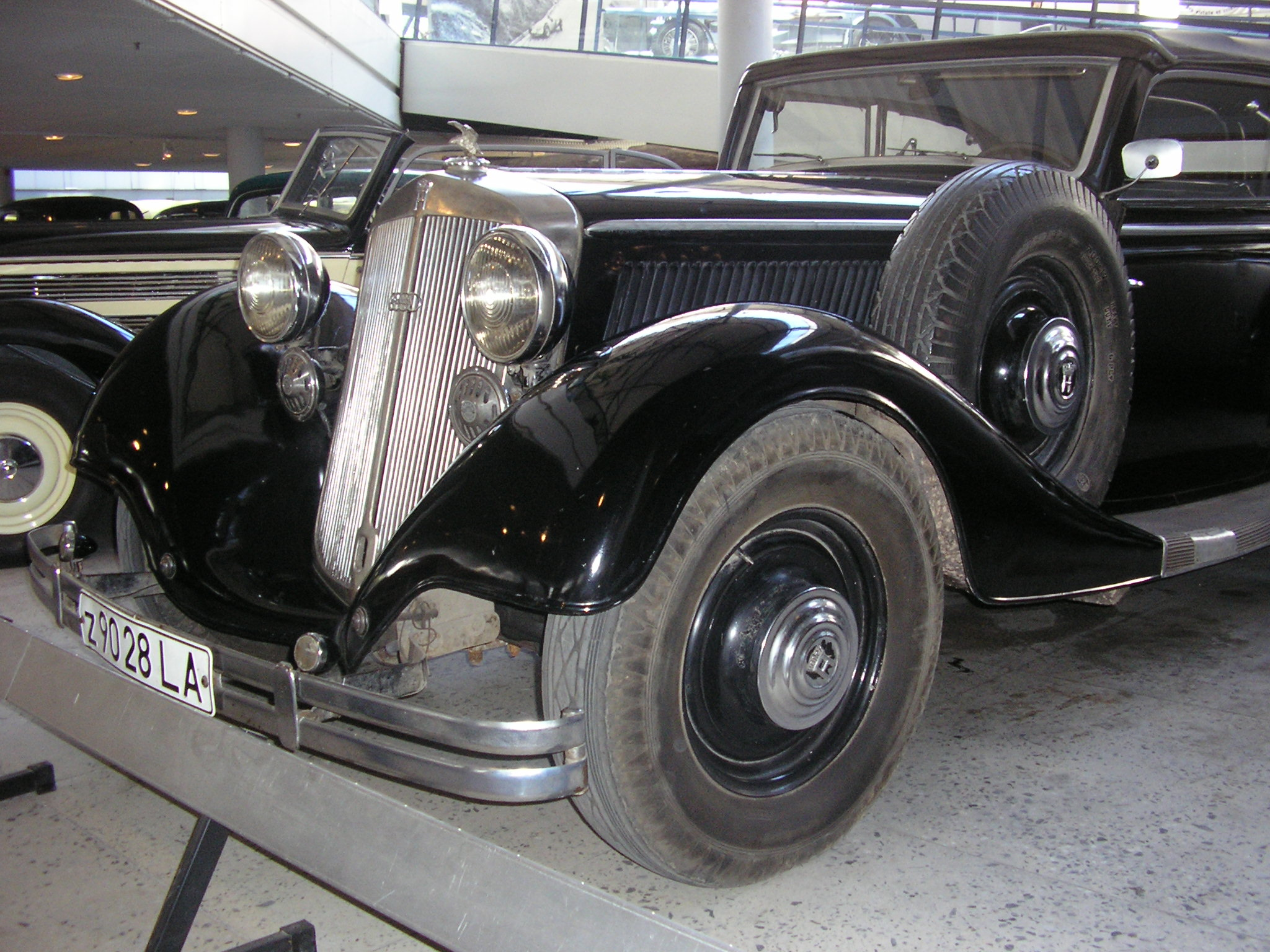
Horch 830BL (1935) in Riga Motor museum

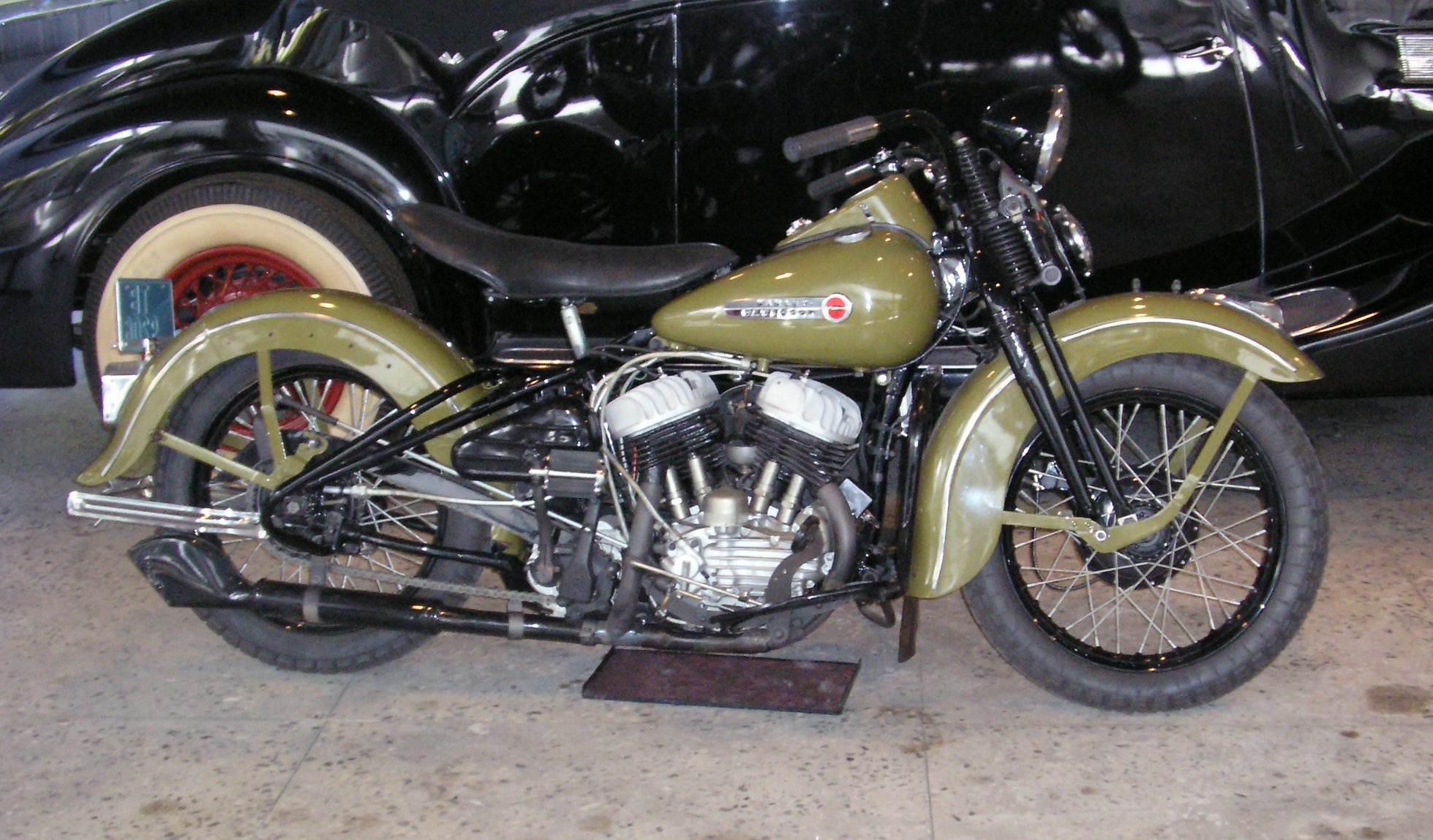
Harley-Davidson mod. WL (1947) in Riga Motor Museum

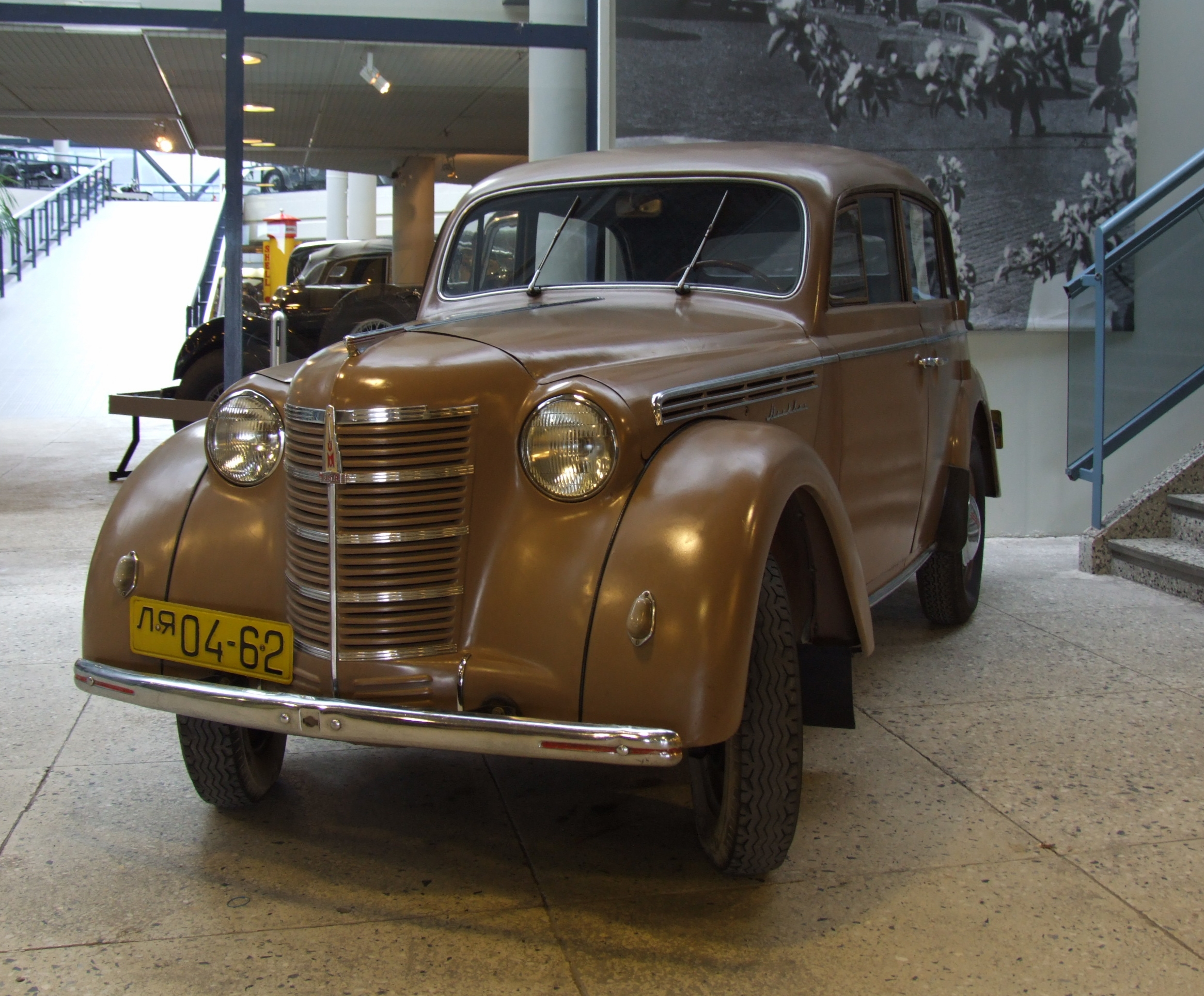
Moskvich 400-420 in Riga motor museum

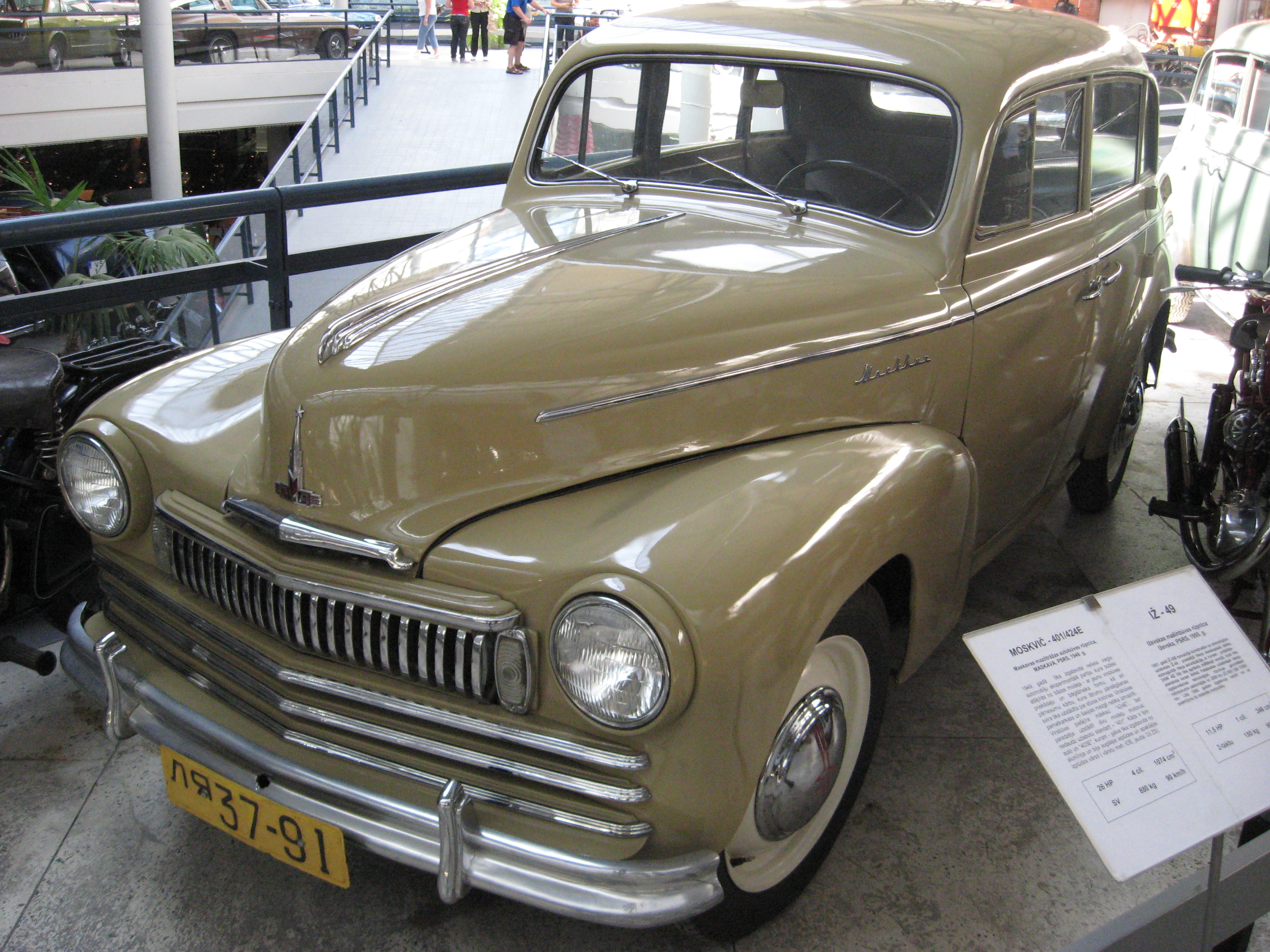
Moskvich 401-424E in Riga Motor museum

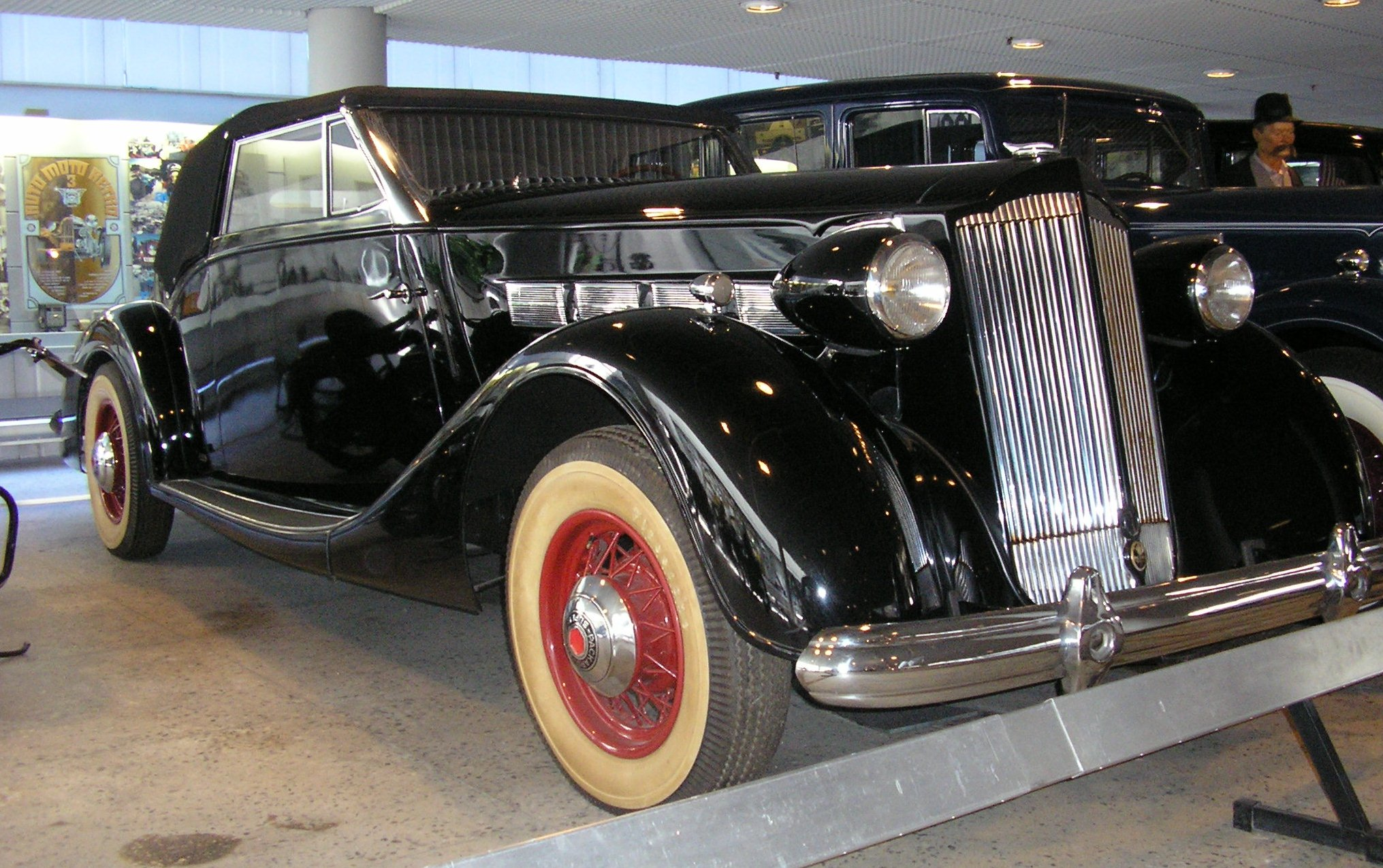
Packard Super Eight 1502 (1937) in Riga Motor museum

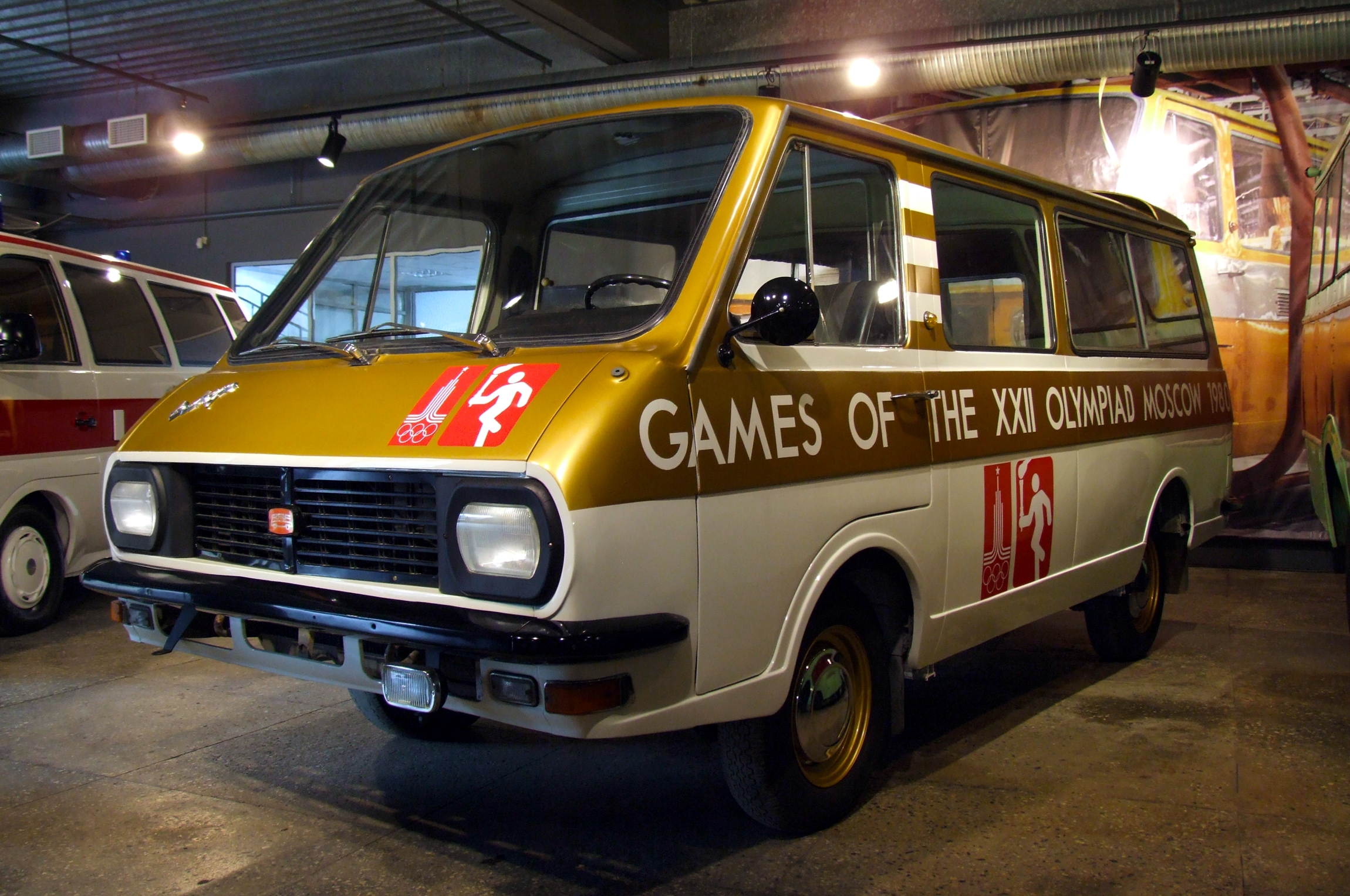
Latvian-built RAF-2907, based on RAF-2203 "Latvija" in Riga Motor museum.

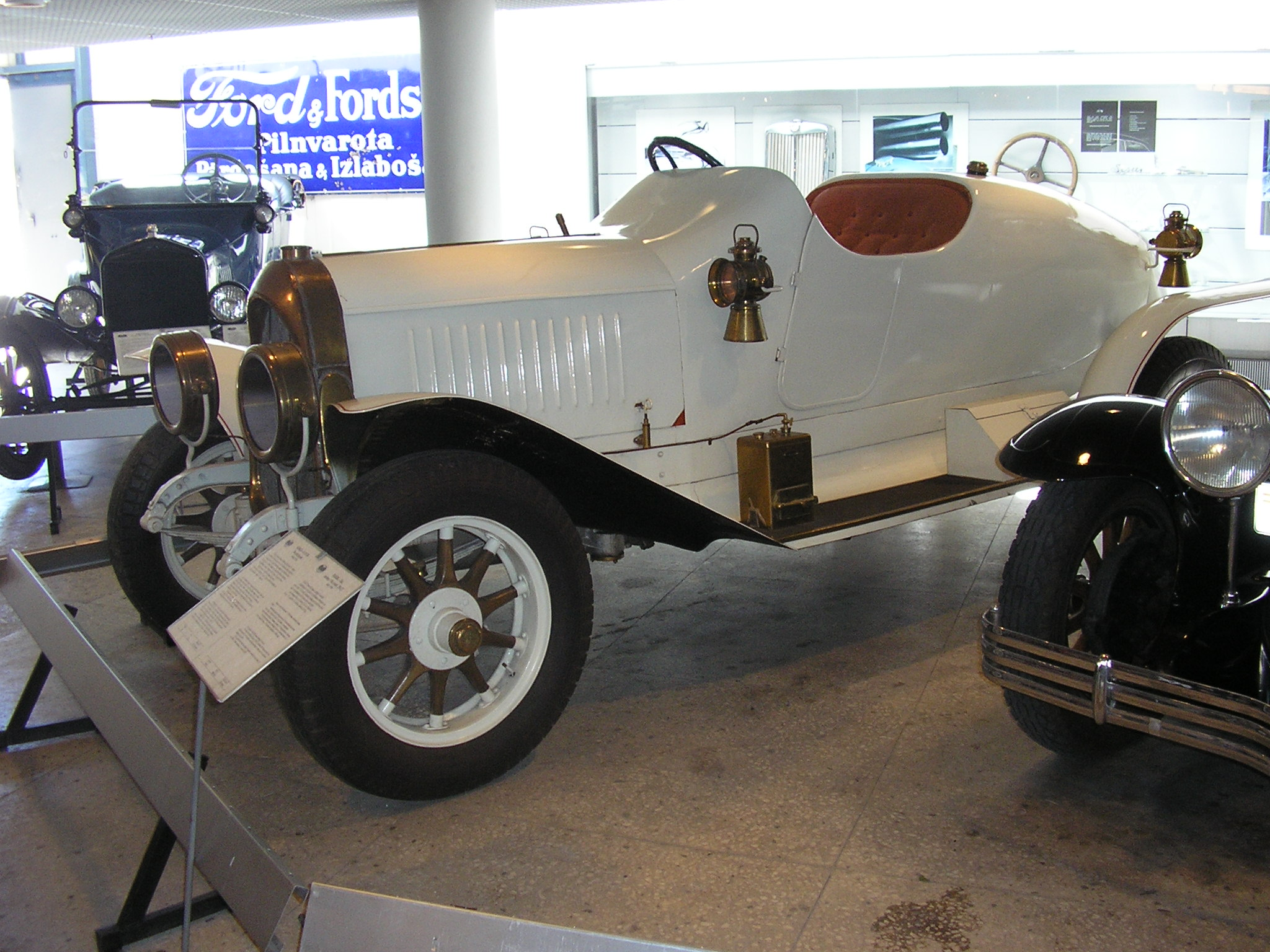
Hansa G 12/36 Renntorpedo (1914) in Riga Motor museum

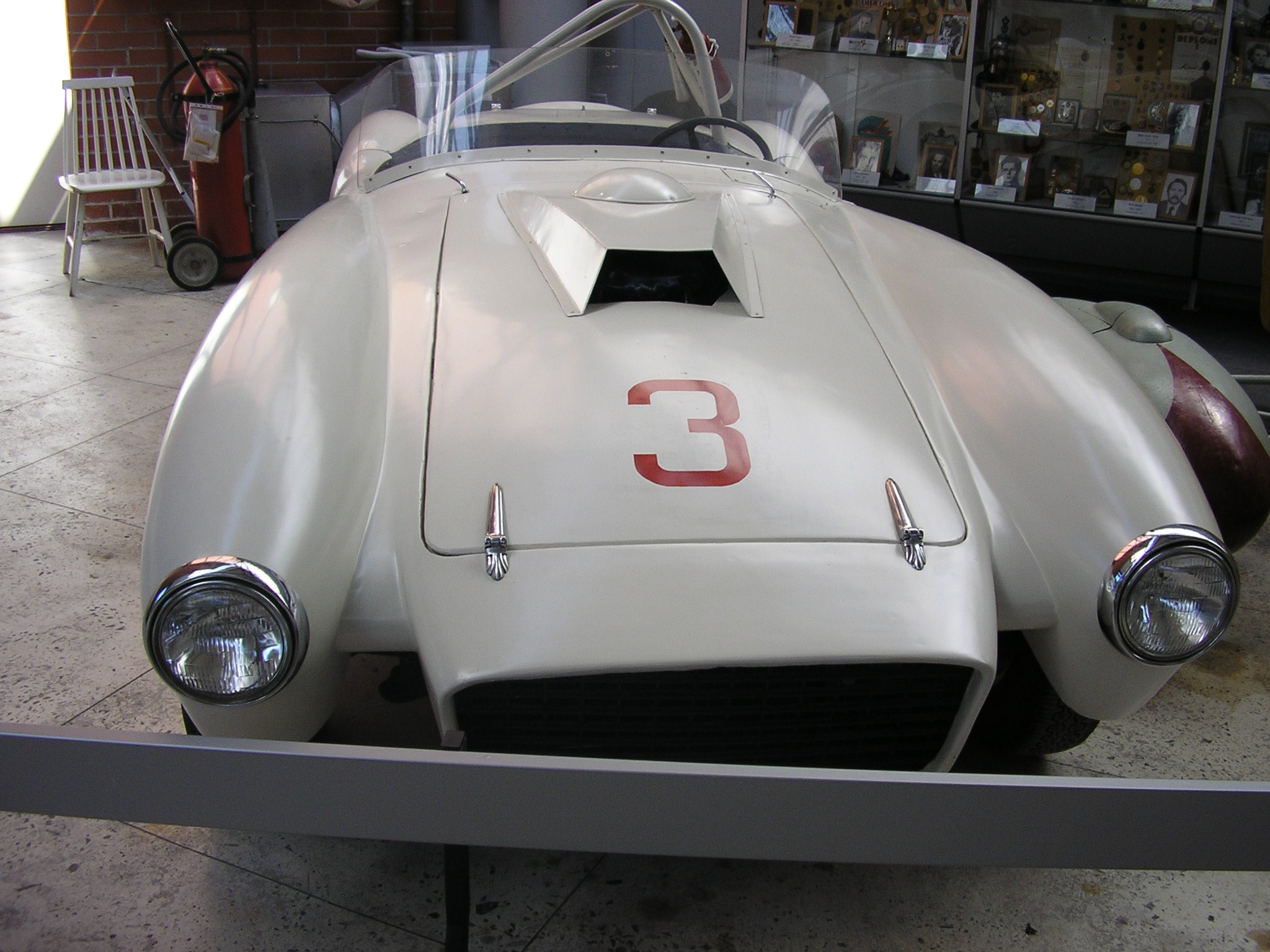
ZIL-112 Sports (1961) in Riga Motor museum
