= ZIL-112 Sports =

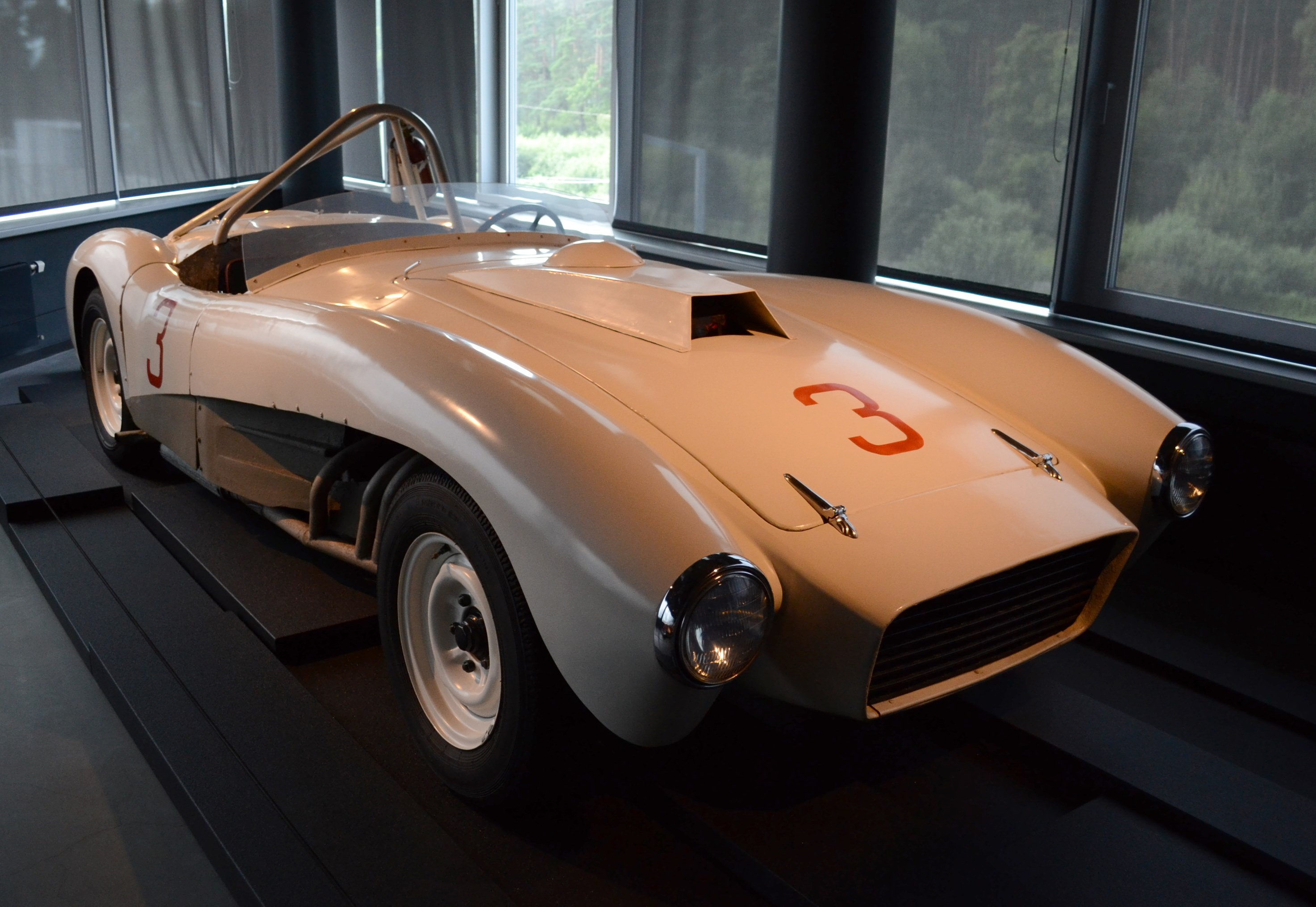

Overview
- Manufacturer: Zavod Imeni Likhacheva
- Production: 1961
- Designer: Vasily Rodionov

Body and chassis
- Class: Sports car
- Layout: FR layout

Powertrain
- Engine: 6.0L ZIL-111 V8

Dimensions
- Wheelbase: 2,190 mm (86.2 in)
- Curb weight: 1,330 kg (2,932 lb)

Chronology
- Predecessor: ZIL-112/5
- Successor: ZIL-412S

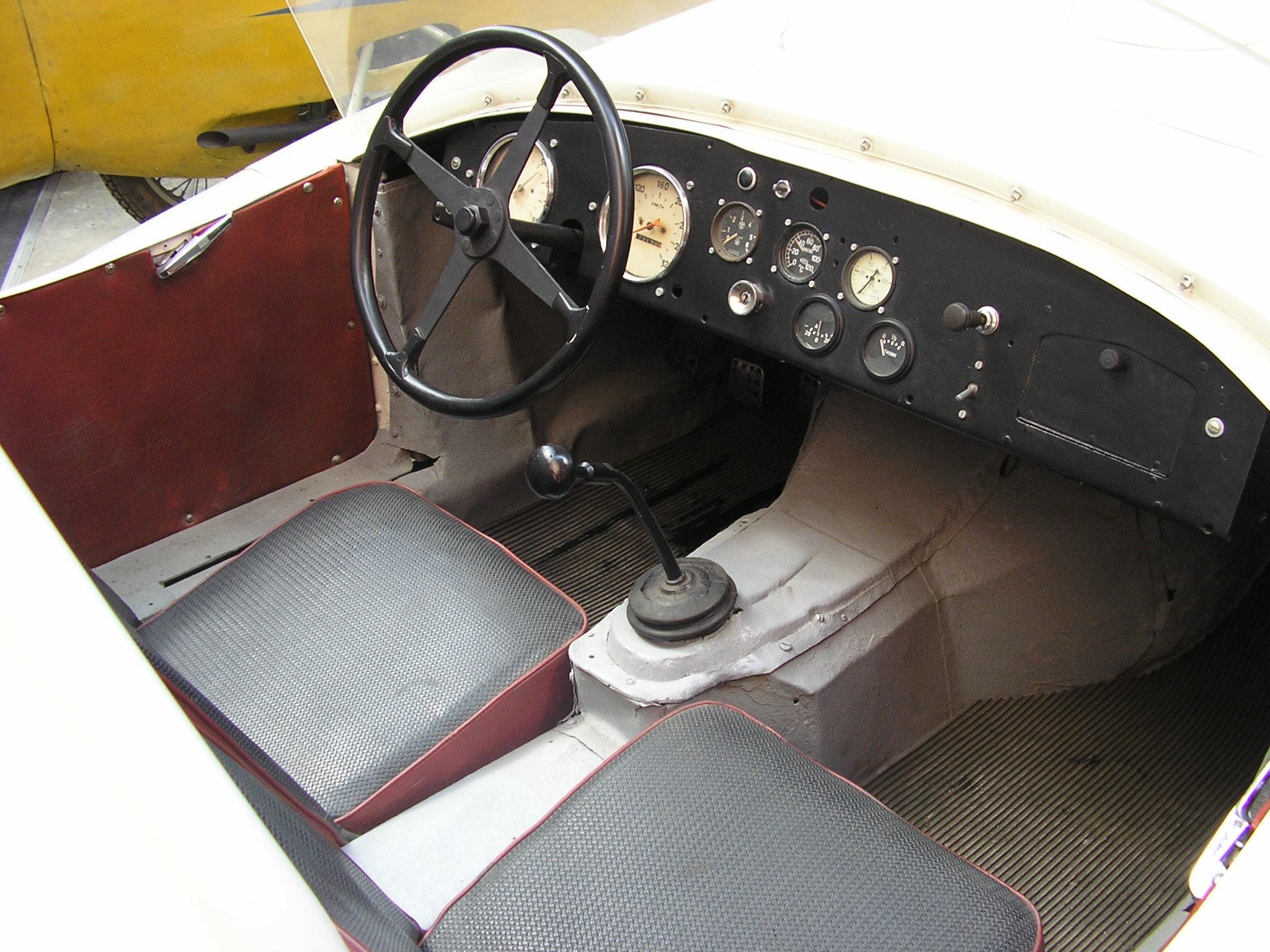
Interior

The ZIL-112 Sports was a Soviet sports car made by ZIL car manufacturer in 1961 and competed in races from 1961 to 1969. Two cars were built. The ZIL-112S initiated a number of firsts for cars produced in the USSR such as controlled slip differential, disc brakes, radial-ply tires etc. One ZIL-112S was powered by a 6.0 L V8 with 230 hp (172 kW). A second ZIL-112S was equipped with a 270 hp (201 kW) 7.0 L V8. Both engines were developed from the ZIS-110 engine. Depending on the engine, the top speed was 260–270 km/h (160–170 mph). It could do 0–100 km/h in 9 seconds. The total weight was 1,330 kg (2,932 lb). Steering and front suspension came from the GAZ-21 Volga. In the rear, it used De Dion suspension with triangular levers. The transmission, like the engine, was from the ZIS-110.

In 1962, one ZIL-112S was rebuilt with a more aerodynamic body for an attempt at a Soviet land speed record. The ZIL-112RG was taken to the Baskunchak salt lake to attempt the record, but the weather was poor and the car topped out at 200–230 km/h (120–140 mph). A second attempt was made at the Dmitrovsky race track, however winter weather made the attempt impossible.

Between 1963 and 1965 the car set five all-Union records in the racetracks. The 270 hp (201 kW) ZIL-112S, driven by Gennady Zharkov, won the USSR Championship in 1964 and 1965.

One ZIL-112S is in the Riga Motor Museum and the other is owned by a Swedish collector.
