= Ford-Vairogs =

Car manufacturer based in Riga, Latvia

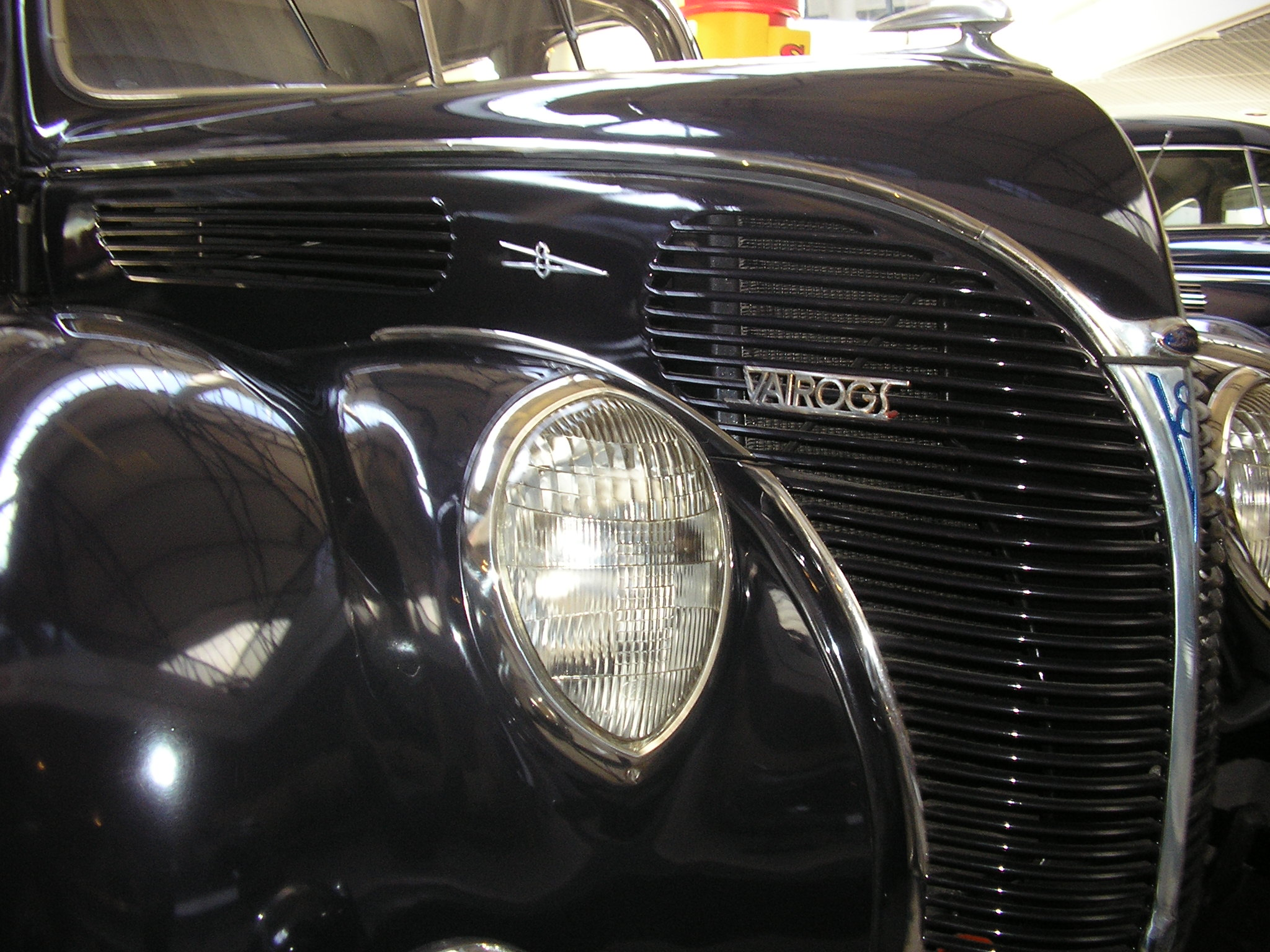
- Industry: Automobile
- Founded: 1936
- Defunct: 1940
- Fate: Nationalized and closed
- Headquarters: Riga, Latvia
- Products: Cars, Trucks, Buses
- Parent: Ford Motor Company (Copenhagen division)

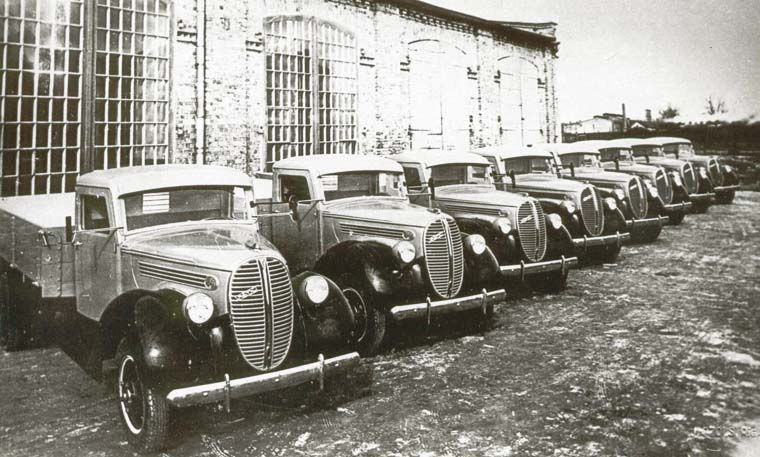
Assembly of Ford-Vairogs trucks in Riga in the late 1930s

Ford-Vairogs ("Vairogs" meaning "Shield") (earlier called "Fenikss") was the name of a car factory in Riga, Latvia, that produced license-built Ford cars between September 1937 and 1940 when it was expropriated as the property of the Soviet government. Not including the war department orders, Ford-Vairogs made 200 buses, 1000 trucks and 332 automobiles.

== History ==
The history of the Vairogs factory began in the late 19th century. In 1895 Austro-Hungarian citizen Oscar Freivirt got permission from the Russian Emperor to establish a train carriage factory in Riga (Rīgas Vagonbūves Rūpnīca). It was known as joint stock company Fēnikss ("Phoenix").

In the 1930s the factory started to experience financial difficulties, and the Latvian government decided to intervene. In Autumn 1936, the Latvian government bought all 4000 shares of the near-bankrupt factory. In December a new state owned company Vairogs was founded. it produced a wide variety of passenger cars, trucks, dumper trucks, buses, ambulances and fire engines, a total of 300 passenger cars and 1'000 trucks.

== Automobile production ==
In the second half of the 1930s, the Latvian economy experienced rapid development and there was constant demand for modern trucks. In 1937 Vairogs company saw their business opportunity and created an automobile department, appointing engineer Pauls Barons, grandson of the Latvian folklorist Krišjānis Barons, as director. Considering all costs and technologies, it was decided to buy a license from a known Western automobile company. In March 1937 Vairogs signed a contract with Copenhagen division of Ford Motor Company. According to contract, Ford Motor company granted car assembly concession to Vairogs factory in Riga. In September, the first Ford-Vairogs V8 3-ton trucks left the production line. In 1938, the factory also started to produce passenger cars and buses. Ford-Vairogs cars became very popular in Latvia because of their low prices and good quality. Ford-Vairogs was the biggest automobile company in the Baltic states.

After World War II started in September 1939, Ford-Vairogs production numbers declined due to the wartime difficulties with engine and other part supplies. After the Soviet occupation of Latvia in 1940 the factory was nationalized and all Ford car production stopped. The Vairogs plant was handed over to the Rigas Vagonbüves Rupnica (Riga Railcar Factory).

The cars made were:

- Ford-Vairogs V8 Standard, a copy of 1939 American Ford-V8 92A
- Ford-Vairogs V8 De Luxe, a copy of 1939 American Ford-V8 91A
- Ford-Vairogs Taunus, a copy of 1939 German Ford Taunus
- Ford-Vairogs Junior, a copy of 1937 British Ford 10 Prefect. It was also made in a military version.
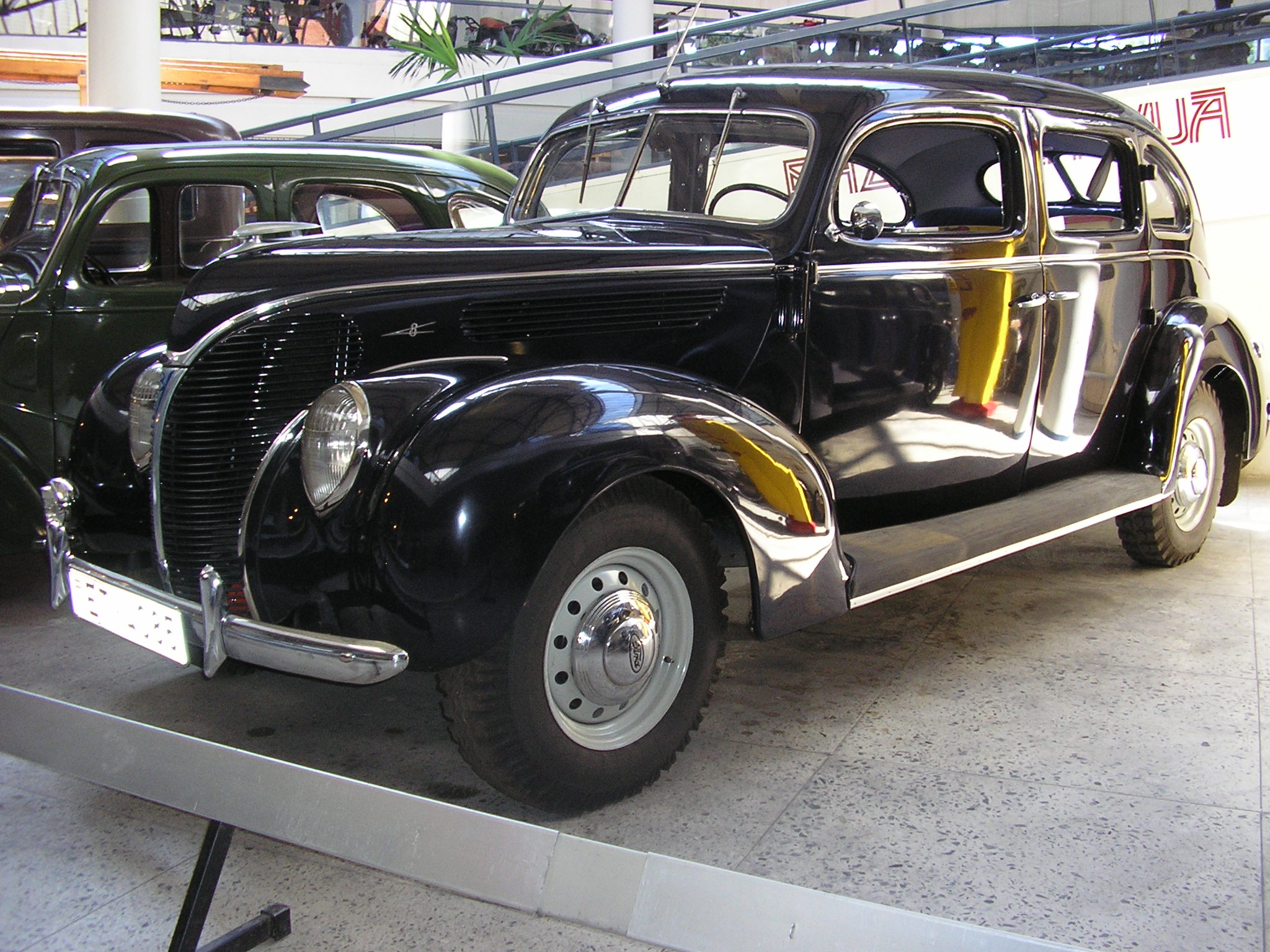
Ford-Vairogs V8 De Luxe. In the Riga Motor Museum.

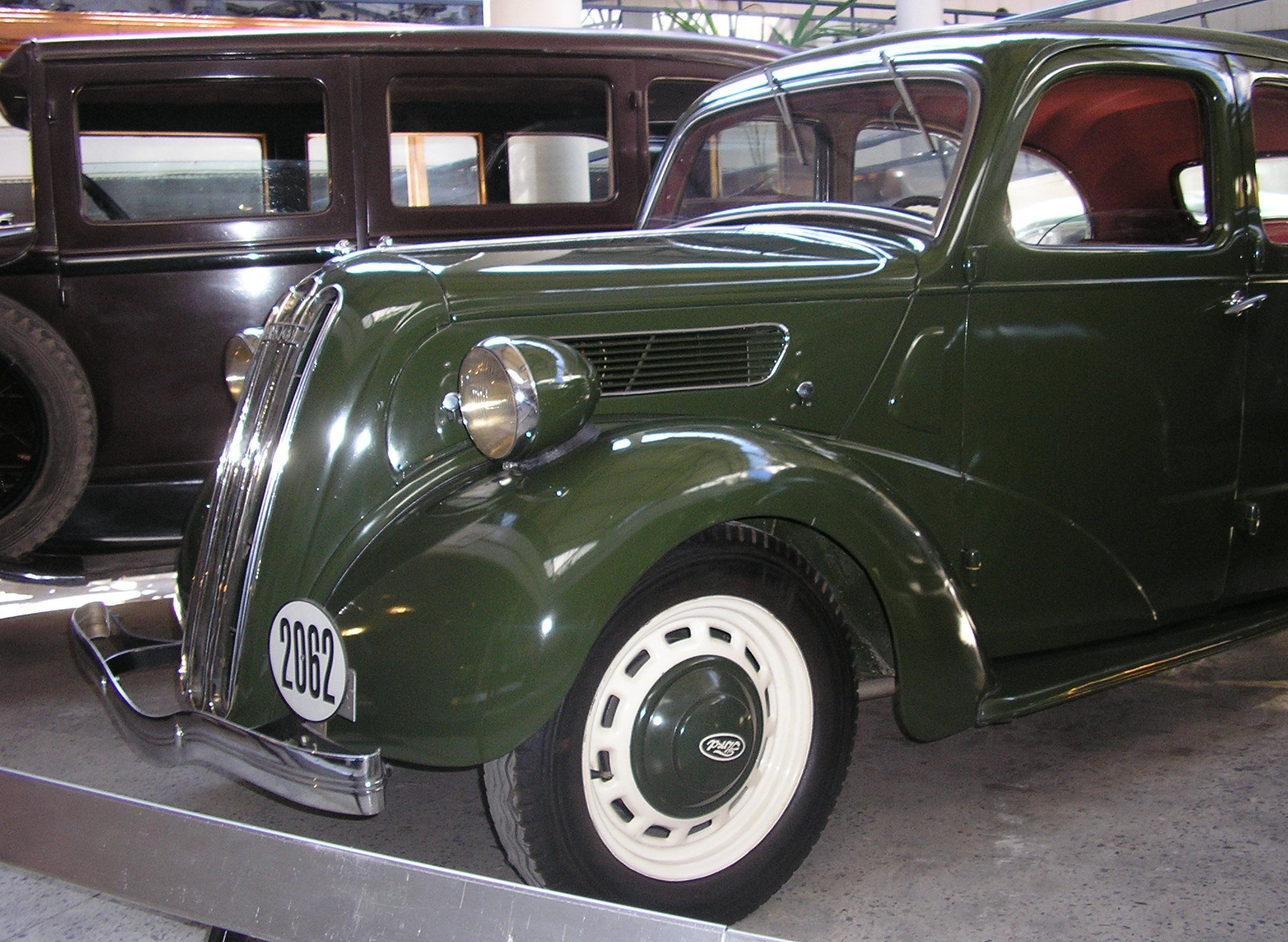
Ford-Vairogs Junior De Luxe. In the Riga Motor Museum.

== Ammunition production ==
In 1937 Vairogs bought out Sellier & Bellot's satellite ammunition plant in Riga. It changed the headstamp from "SB" to a stylized "V". In addition to civilian cartridges, it made 7.92x57mm Mauser and .303 British ammunition for military clients in the region. After the Soviet occupation in 1940, it was nationalized as Factory 520 and began manufacturing 7.62×54mmR Russian ammunition - still using the "V" headstamp. It was closed in June 1941 due to the German invasion and its machinery was evacuated to Sverdlovsk. The machinery was later returned in 1944/1945 and production was resumed until 1946.

== Train car production ==
After the war Vairogs was renamed Rīgas Vagonbūves Rūpnīca ("Riga Train-car Factory") and went back to manufacturing train cars.
