= Ford Model 91 =

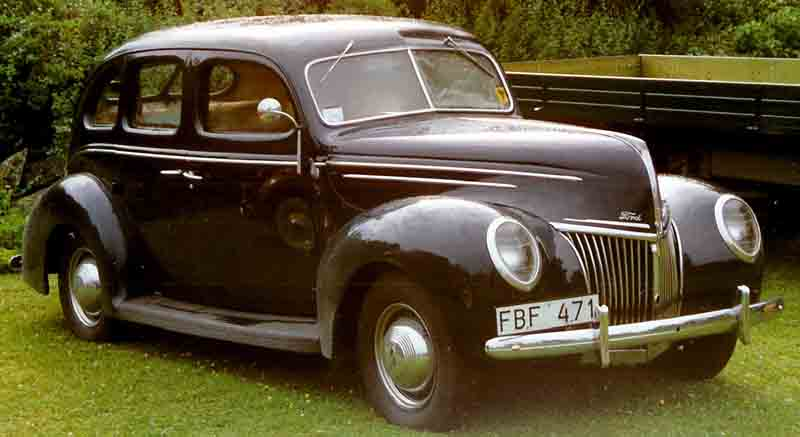
- 1939 Ford Model 91A Deluxe Fordor Sedan (body style 73B).

Overview
- Manufacturer: Ford; Ford of Britain; Matford; Ford-Vairogs
- Production: 1939

Body and chassis
- Body style: 4-door saloon, convertible, estate car.

Powertrain
- Engine: 3.6 L V-8

Dimensions
- Wheelbase: 106 inches (2.69 m)
- Length: 176 inches (4.47 m)

Chronology
- Predecessor: Ford Model 81
- Successor: Ford Model 01; Ford Pilot (UK)

The Ford Model 91 is a car that was produced in 1939 by Ford and various subsidiaries, including Ford UK, Matford and Ford-Vairogs.

== Production and sales ==
=== In the United States ===
Introduced in November 1938, the Ford Model 91A was the Deluxe model for 1939, the Standard model being the Ford Model 922. The Model 91A had a more modern appearance than the Model 922 and the 1938 Ford Model 81. Around 198,000 were produced in the US. Body styles included:

- Tudor (body style 70B),
- Fordor (73B),
- Convertible Fordor (74),
- Convertible Coupé (76),
- Coupé (77B),
- Station Wagon (79).

Commercial vehicles and even trucks were produced using the Model 91 general design:

- 1/2 ton Model 91 C,
- 3/4 ton Model 91 D,
- 1 ton Model 91 Y,
- 1 1/2 ton Model 91 T,
- 1 1/2 ton cab-over-engine Model 91 W.

=== Ford UK ===
The Model 91 of Ford UK was the last of the British pre-war V-8 range that had started with the V8 18 in 1932. For the British market it was available as a 2-door convertible, a 2 door, 5-seat estate and a 4-door, 4-seat saloon. In total, 1,878 were made.

=== Other countries ===
In France, the Model 91 was produced by Matford as V 8 F 91 A. In addition to the passenger cars, the Matford 91 chassis was also used for military light trucks and ambulances (F 91 C) at the start of World War II.

The Model 91 was also license built by Ford-Vairogs in Latvia as Ford-Vairogs V8 De Luxe.

== Conception ==
The Ford Model 91 was powered by a 3622 cc Ford Sidevalve V8 and still used the transverse leaf suspension pioneered on the Model T.

It differs from previous models by the adoption of Lockheed hydraulic brakes.

== Books ==
- Burness, Tad (1985). American truck & bus spotter's guide, 1920-1985. Osceola, Wis., USA : Motorbooks International. ISBN 978-0-87938-198-1..
- Kimes, Beverly Rae (1989). Standard catalog of American cars, 1805-1942. Iola, Wis. : Krause Publications. ISBN 978-0-87341-111-0.
- Sedgwick, Michael (2010) [1989]. A-Z of cars of the 1930s (2nd ed.). Beaworthy : Herridge. ISBN 978-1-906133-25-2.
- Vauvillier, François; Touraine, Jean-Michel; Jeudy, Jean-Gabriel (1992). L'automobile sous l'uniforme 1939–1940 [The Car in Uniform 1939–1940] (in French). Editions Ch. Massin. ISBN 2-7072-0197-9.
